= Karlovo Municipality =

Coordinates: 42°38′37″N 25°48′26″E

Karlovo Municipality Община Карлово
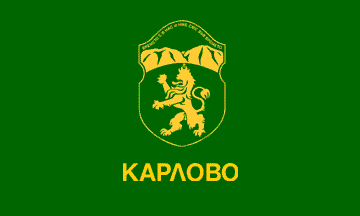
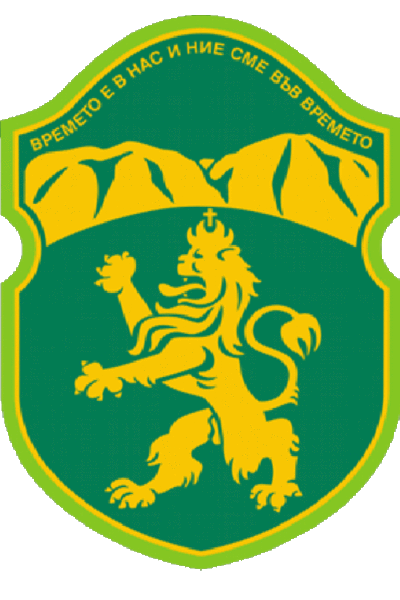
- Flag Coat of arms

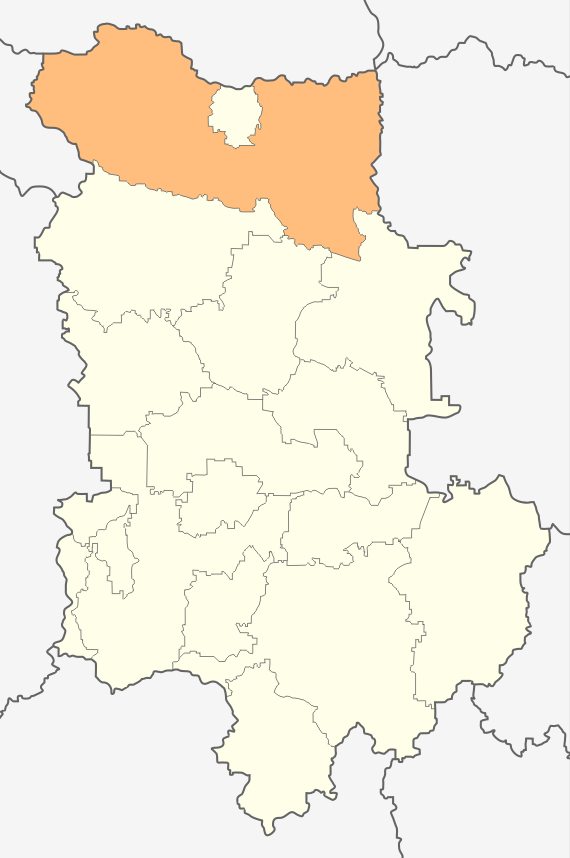
- Country: Bulgaria
- Province: Plovdiv Province
- Seat: Karlovo

Area
  - Total: 1,059.1 km^{2} (408.9 sq mi)

Population (2024)
  - Total: 44,894
  - Density: 42.389/km^{2} (109.79/sq mi)
- Website: karlovo.bg

Karlovo Municipality (Bulgarian: Община Карлово) is a municipality in Plovdiv Province, central Bulgaria. Covering a territory of 1,059.1 km^{2}, it is the largest of the 18 municipalities in the province, encompassing 17.67% of its total area, as well as the eighth largest in Bulgaria, constituting nearly 1% of the national territory. It borders the municipalities of Brezovo, Kaloyanovo and Hisarya to the south, Koprivshtitsa and Anton to the west, Teteven, Troyan, Apriltsi and Sopot to the north, and Pavel Banya to the east.

== Geography ==
The relieve of the municipality is varied. In its center lies the Karlovo Valley spanning an area of 280 km^{2} with a length of 37 km in direction west–east and a width ranging from 2–3 km in the west and 15 km in the east. In its southernmost part is the municipality’s lowest altitude at 264 m. North of the valley rises the highest part of the Balkan Mountains, formed from three divisions of the range — Zlatitsa–Teteven Mountain with highest summit Vezhen (2,198 m), Troyan Mountain with highest peak Levski (2,166 m), and Kalofer Mountain with the summit of Botev (2,376 m), the highest point of the whole mountain range and the municipality. The main crest of the Balkan Mountains forms the boundary with the neighbouring Lovech Province to the north. South of the Karlovo Valley are the northern slopes the Sredna Gora mountain range, whose highest summit Golyam Bogdan (1,604 m) lies on the border with Koprivshtitsa Municipality of Sofia Province.

Karlovo Municipality falls within the transitional continental climatic zone at lower elevations and the Alpine zone in the high mountains. The average annual temperature is 11.4 °C. About 90% of its territory is drained by the upper course of the river Stryama, a major left tributary of the Maritsa in the Aegean Sea drainage. The Stryama receives its two most important tributaries, the Byala reka and the Stara reka within the municipal area. The remaining 10% of the municipality to the northeast is drained by the uppermost course of the Tundzha, the longest tributary of the Maritsa.

== Transport ==
Karlovo Municipality is traversed by five roads of the national network with a total length of 124.2 km, including a 55.3 km stretch of the first class I-6 road Gyueshevo–Sofia–Karlovo–Burgas, the final 22.7 km section of the second class II-35 road Pleven–Lovech–Troyan–Karnare, the first 9.6 km of the second class II-64 road Karlovo–Plovdiv, the first 28.1 km of the third class III-607, and the whole 8.5 km length of the third class III-641 road.

It is traversed by a 66.8 km section of the major railway line No. 3 Iliyantsi (Sofia)–Karlovo–Sliven–Karnobat–Varna and the final 16.3 km of railway line No. 82 Plovdiv–Karlovo.

== Demography ==
The population is 44,894 as of 2024.

There are 23 villages and four towns in Karlovo Municipality:

- Banya
- Beguntsi
- Bogdan
- Dabene
- Domlyan
- Gorni Domlyan
- Hristo Danovo
- Iganovo
- Kalofer
- Karavelovo
- Karlovo
- Karnare
- Kliment
- Klisura
- Kurtovo
- Marino Pole
- Moskovets
- Mrachenik
- Pevtsite
- Rozino
- Slatina
- Sokolitsa
- Stoletovo
- Vasil Levski
- Vedrare
- Voynyagovo

== Gallery ==
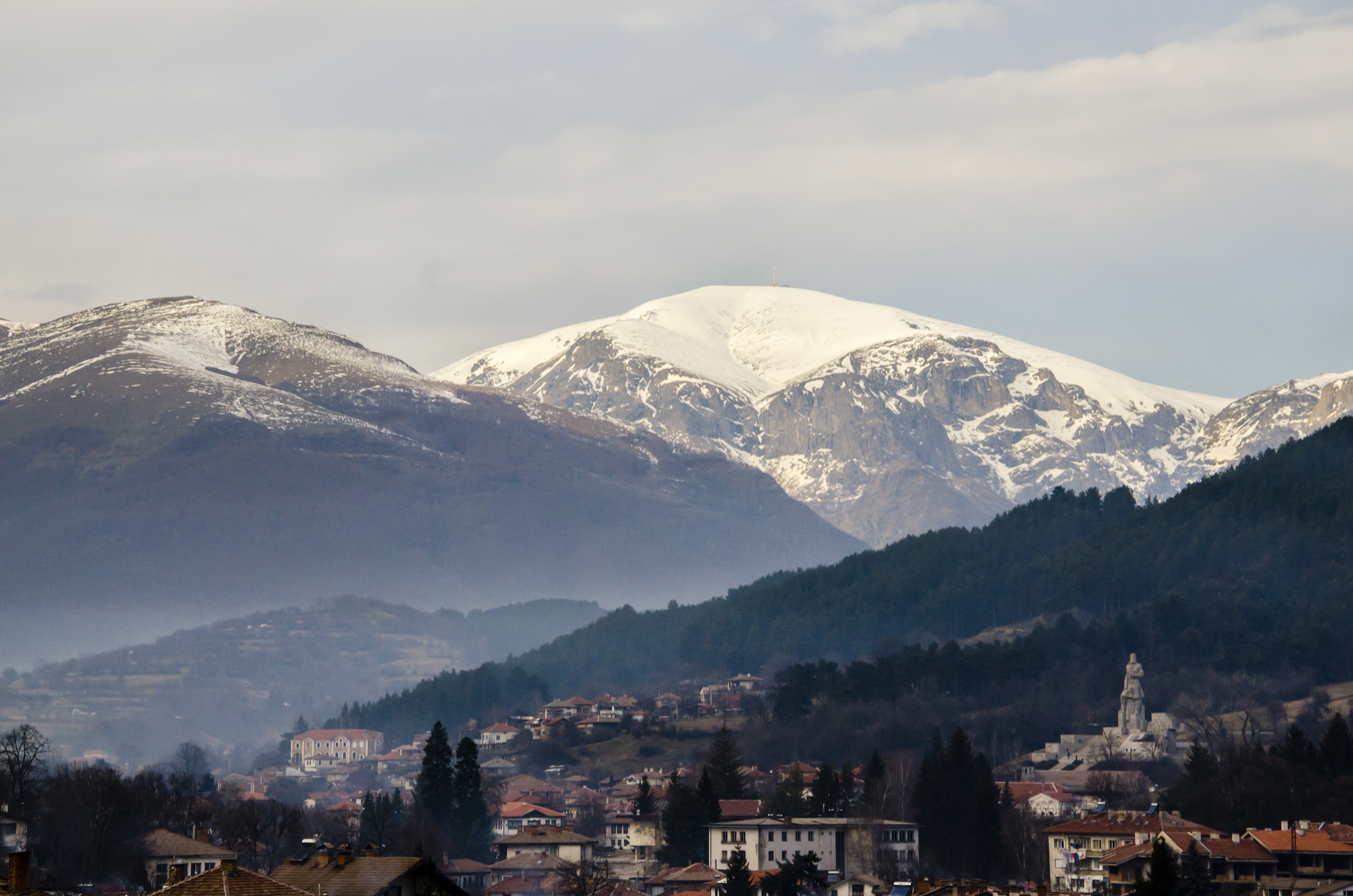
A view of Kalofer with Botev

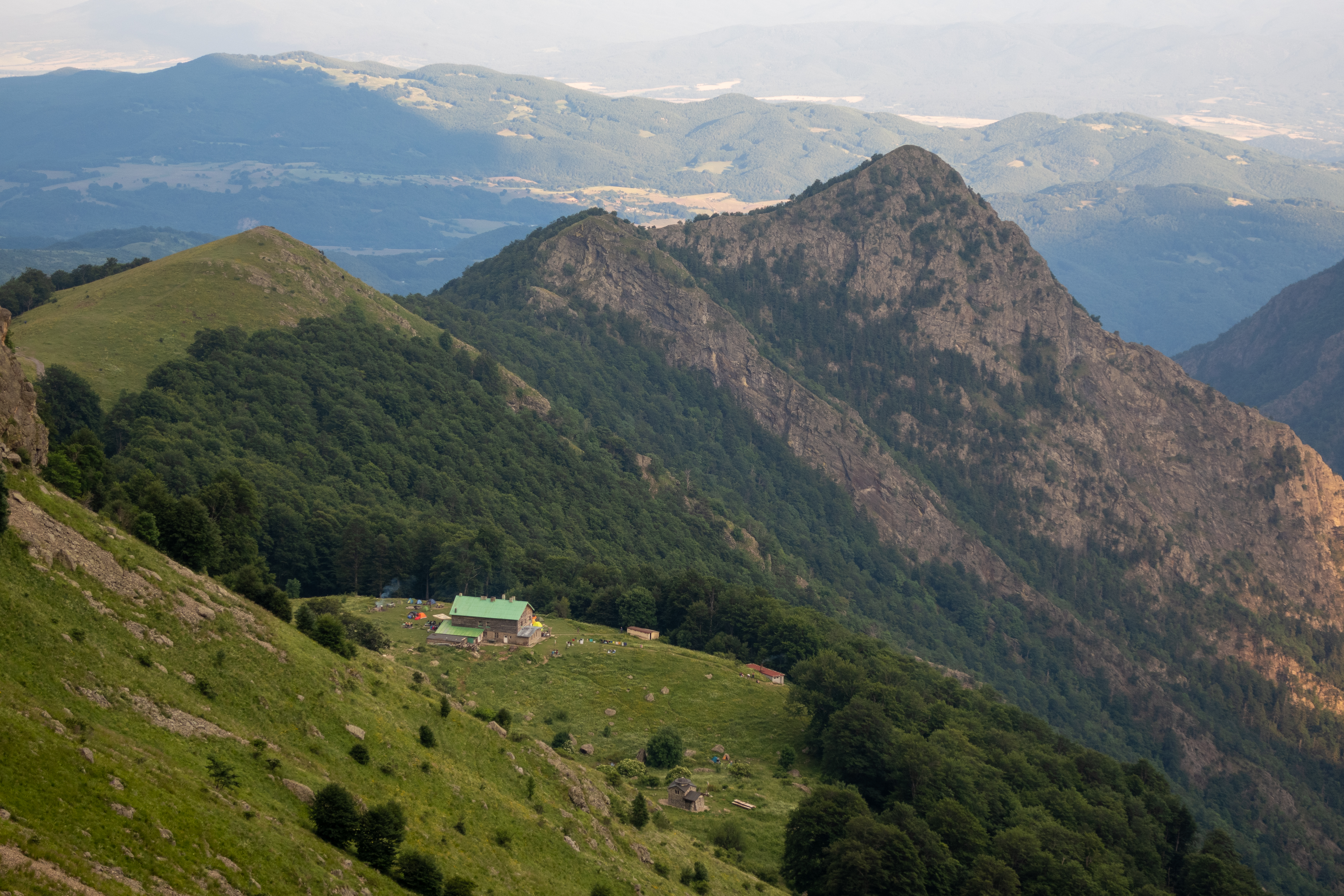
A view of the Balkan Mountains

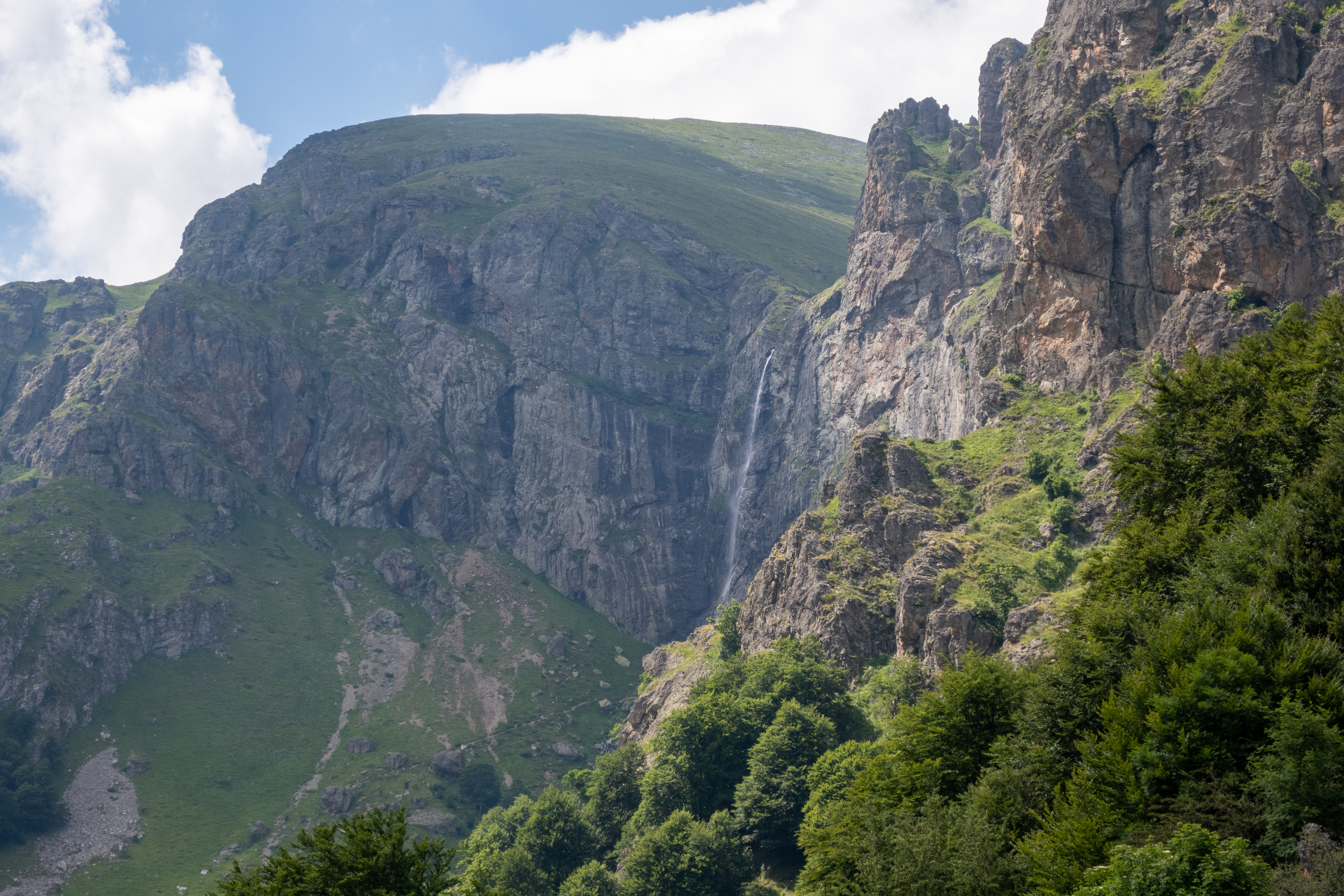
A view to the Raysko Praskalo, the highest waterfall in the Balkans

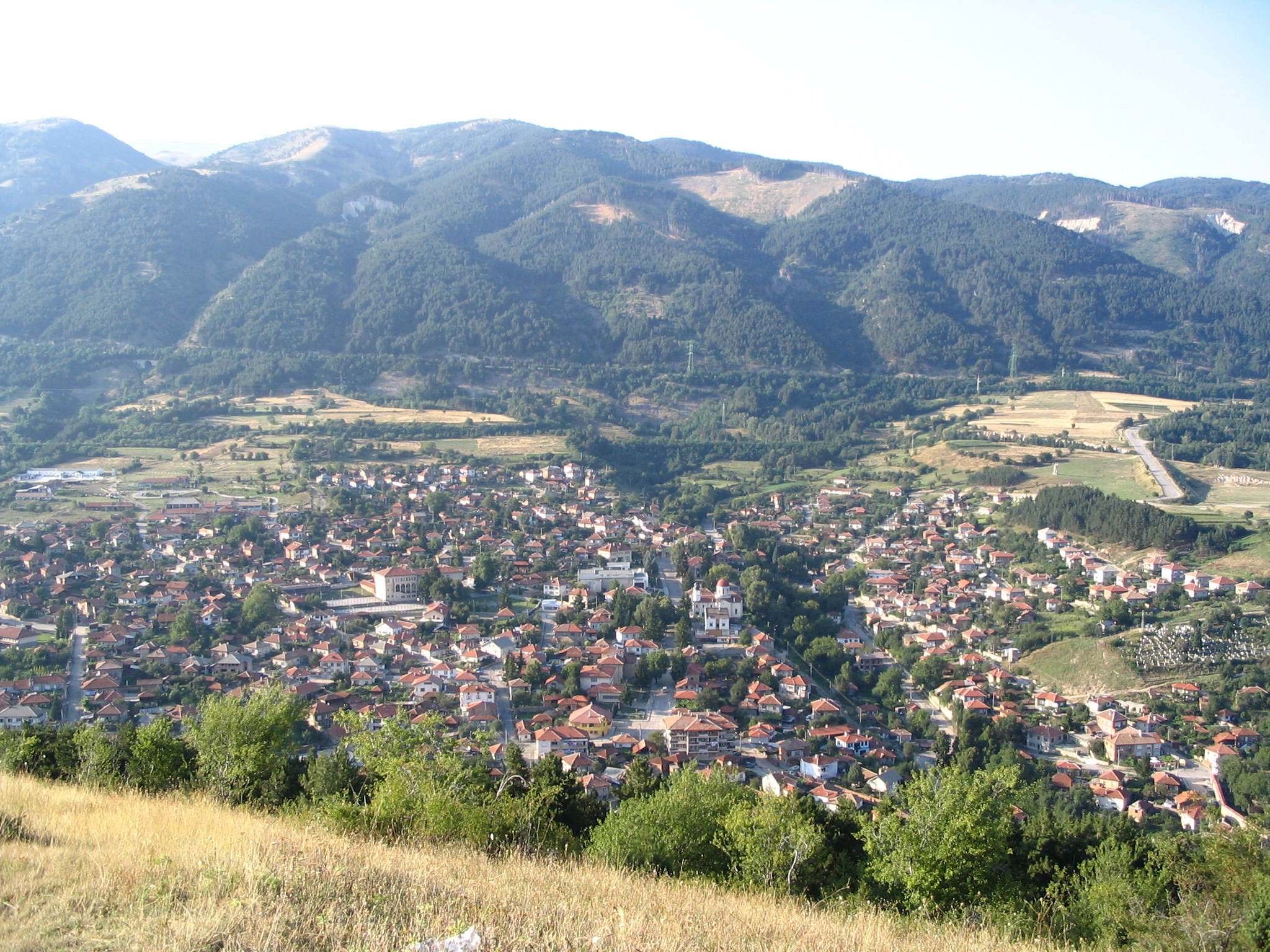
A view of Klisura

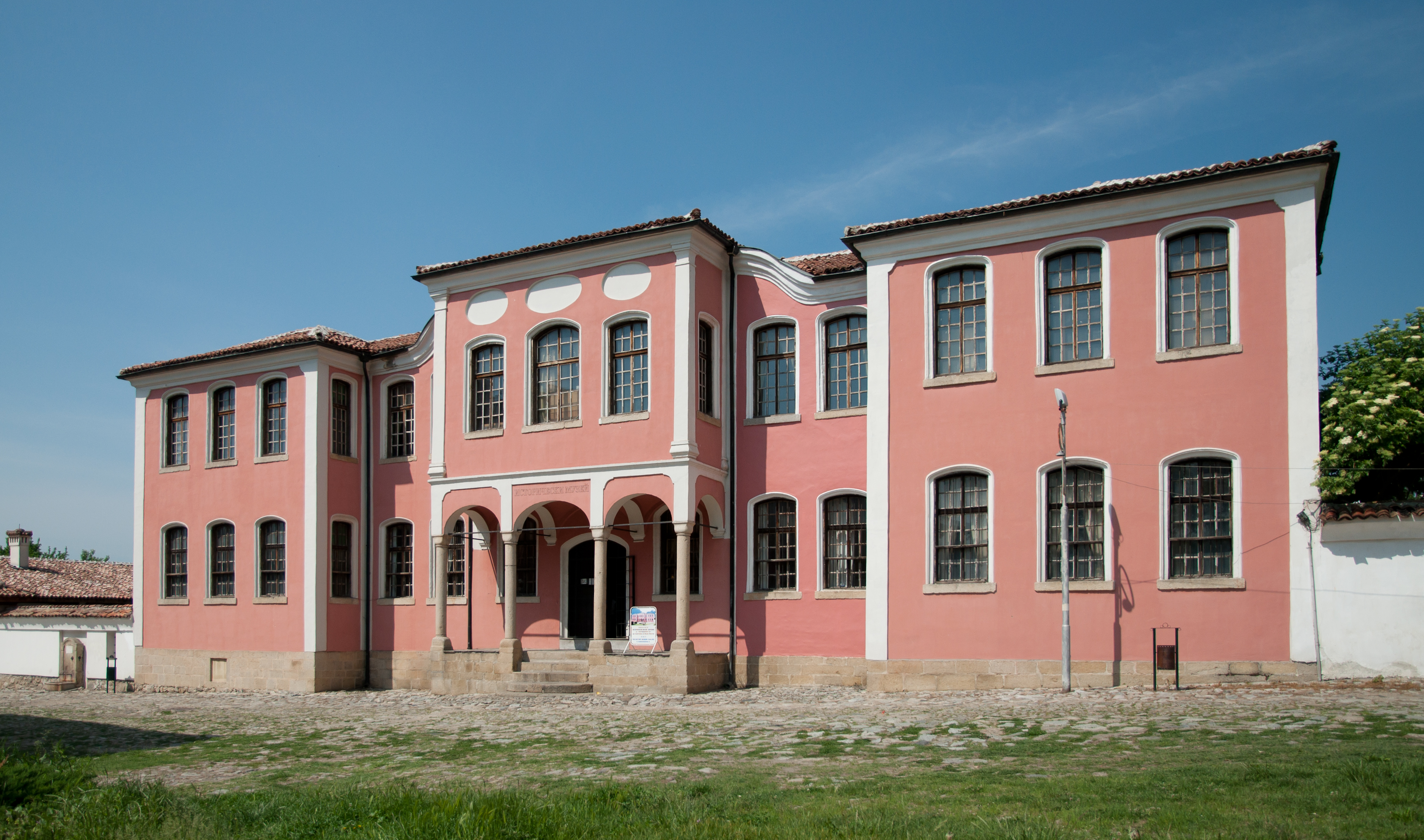
The Museum of History in Karlovo
