= Ghana Naydenova =

Bulgarian teacher

Ghana Naydenova (Bulgarian: Гана Найденова, 1851–1916), was a Bulgarian teacher, known for her participation in the national liberation movement.

She was born in Sopot, educated in a girls school, and worked as a teacher in Sopot after graduation, and later in Klisura. She participated in the national liberation movement to free Bulgaria from the Ottoman Empire by sewing uniforms and raising funds for the movement. She famously participated in the April Uprising of 1878. When it was crushed, she was forced to hide in the woods. When she was captured, she was subjected to torture during the interrogation.
