= Stryama =

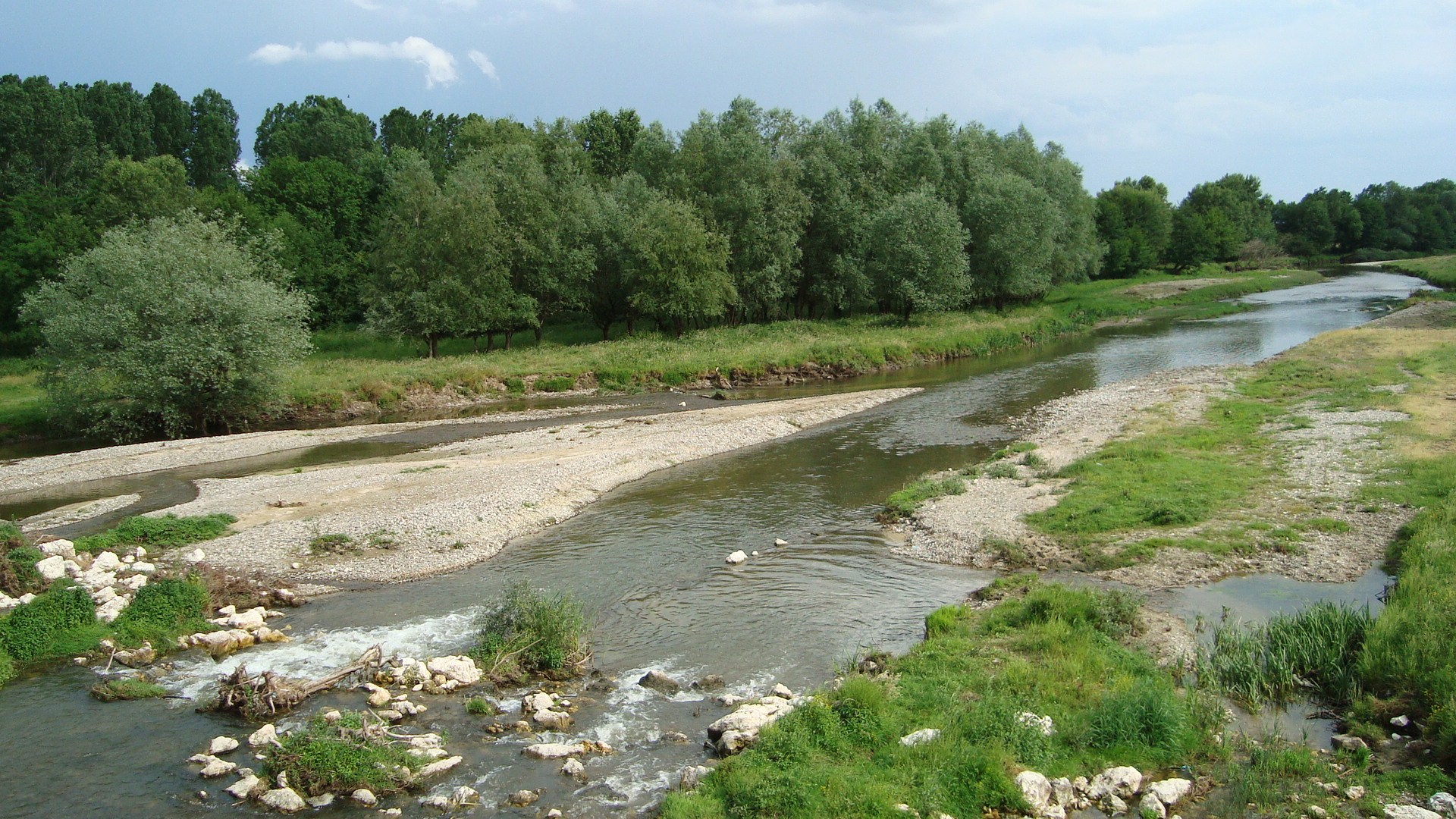

Location
- Country: Bulgaria

Physical characteristics
- Source
  - location: S of Vezhen Peak, Balkan Mountains
  - coordinates: 42°45′0″N 24°24′10.08″E
  - elevation: 2,158 m (7,080 ft)
- Mouth
  - location: Maritsa
  - coordinates: 42°9′32.04″N 24°56′8.16″E
  - elevation: 149 m (489 ft)
- Length: 110 km (68 mi)
- Basin size: 1,394 km^{2} (538 sq mi)

Basin features
- Progression: Maritsa→ Aegean Sea

The Stryama (Bulgarian: Стряма [ˈstrʲamɐ], known in Antiquity as Syrmus) is a river in southern Bulgaria, an important left tributary of the Maritsa. It originates in the Balkan Mountains. The river is 110 kilometres in length and is the sixth longest in the Maritsa drainage, following the Tundzha (390 km), the Arda (290 km), the Ergene (281 km), the Topolnitsa (155 km) and the Sazliyka (145 km). According to the Bulgarian linuist Yordan Zaimov, the etymology of the river derived from Thracian serm, meaning flow.

== Geography ==
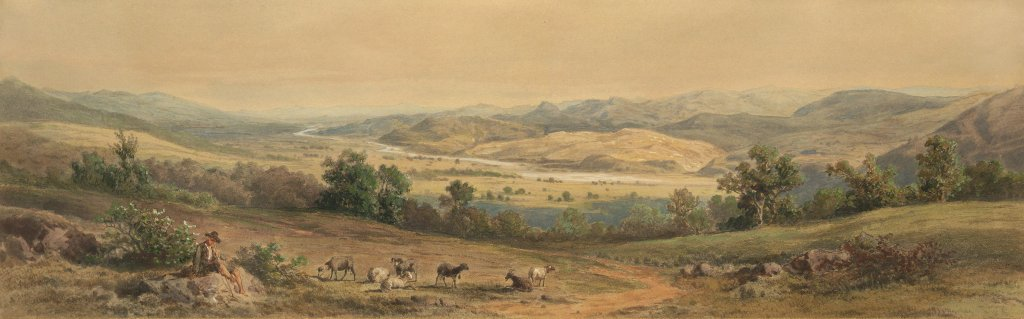
Stryama river valley by Felix Philipp Kanitz

The river takes its source under the name Kameninitsa at an altitude of 2,158 m at the southern foothills of the summit of Vezhen (2,198 m) in the central Balkan Mountains. Until the town of Klisura it flows south in a deep valley with a large longitudinal slope. The river then turns east and southeast, enters the Karlovo Valley and crosses its southern reaches in a wide shallow riverbed. Downstream of the town of Banya the Struma turns southwards and forms a 3 km gorge between Sashtinska Sredna Gora to the west and Sarnena Sredna Gora to the east.

After leaving the gorge, the Stryama enters the Upper Thracian Plain, where its current is slow, in a wide and shallow riverbed. Near the village of Ivan Vazovo part of the river's waters are diverted artificially into a major irrigation canal, which flows independently into the Maritsa. The river proper flows into the Maritsa at an altitude of 149 m about 2.3 km south of the village of Manole. The river receives numerous tributaries, the most important being the Byala reka (37 km) and the Stara reka (20 km) in its upper course.

Its drainage basin covers a territory of 1,394 km^{2} or 2.6% of the Maritsa's total and borders the basins of the Vit, Osam and Yantra of the Danube drainage to the north, the Tundzha to the northeast, the Brezovska reka and Srebra to the east, the Pyasachnik to the west and the Topolnitsa to the northwest, all of them left tributaries of the Maritsa.

The Stryama has predominantly rain–snow feed with high water in March–June and low water in July–October. The average annual flow is 0.80 m^{3}/s at Klisura, 2.05 m^{3}/s at Banya and 8.56 m^{3}/s at Manole. The river has caused large floods in the past and as a result its whole riverbed in the Upper Thracian Plain is corrected with protective dikes. Despite these measures, the river washes away several bridges during 2007–2008 floods.

The most abundant fish species are common rudd, common chub and round-scales barbel. Threatened fish species include Macedonian vimba and Balkan golden loach.

== Settlements and economy ==
The Stryama flows entirely in Plovdiv Province. There are two towns and six villages along its course — the towns of Klisura and Banya and the village of Slatina in Karlovo Municipality, as well as the villages of Dolna Mahala, Chernozemen and Razhevo Konare in Kaloyanovo Municipality and Trilistnik and Manole in Maritsa Municipality.

A 19.8 km stretch of the second class II-64 road Plovdiv–Karlovo follows its valley between Banya and Chernozemen. A section of the Bulgarian State Railways line No. 82 Plovdiv–Karlovo follows the river between Dabene and Chernozemen. Its waters are utilised for irrigation for the intensive agriculture in the Upper Thracian Plain and the Karlovo Valley and are diverted in several large canals.

== Gallery ==
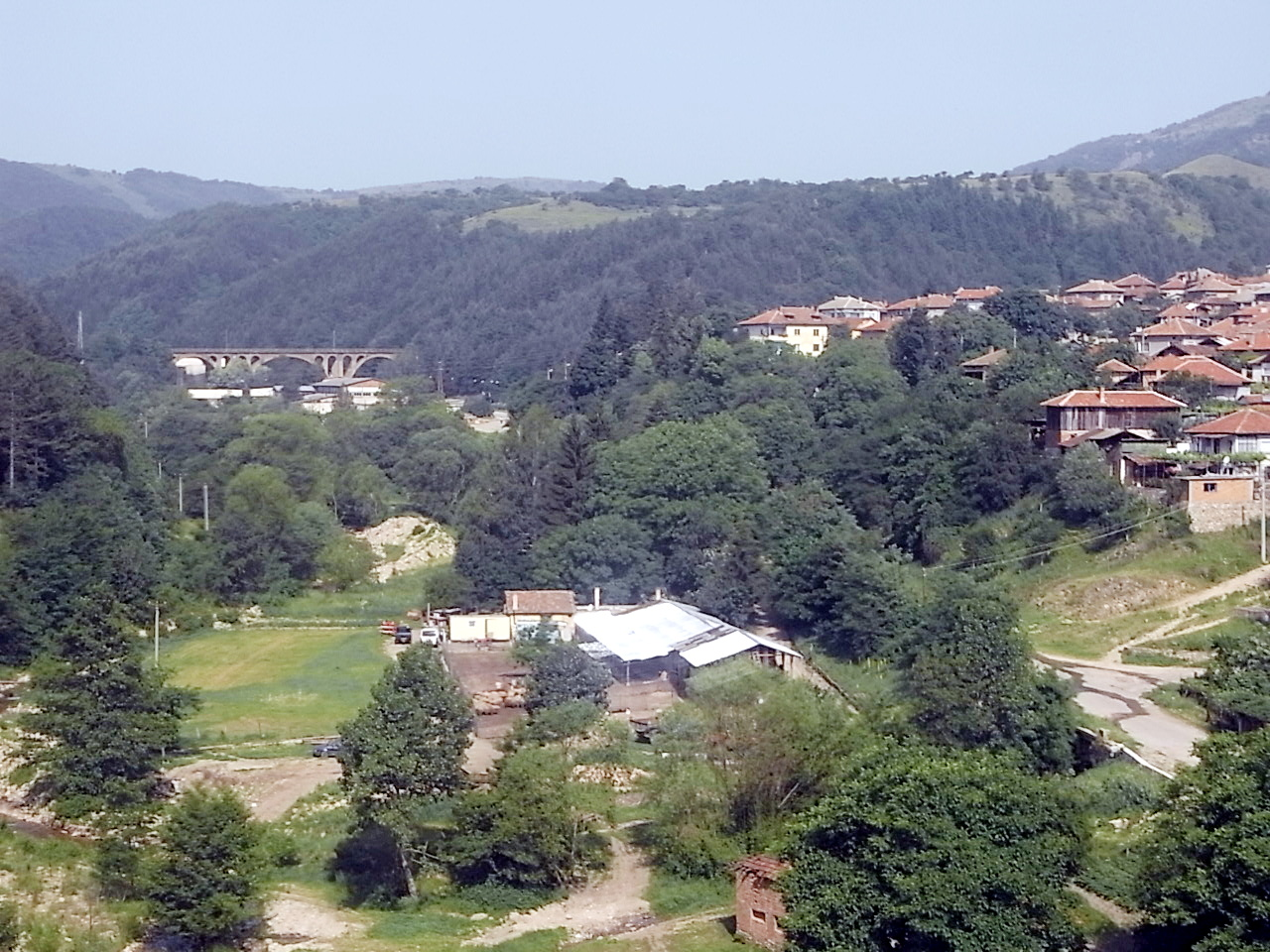
Upper valley near Klisura

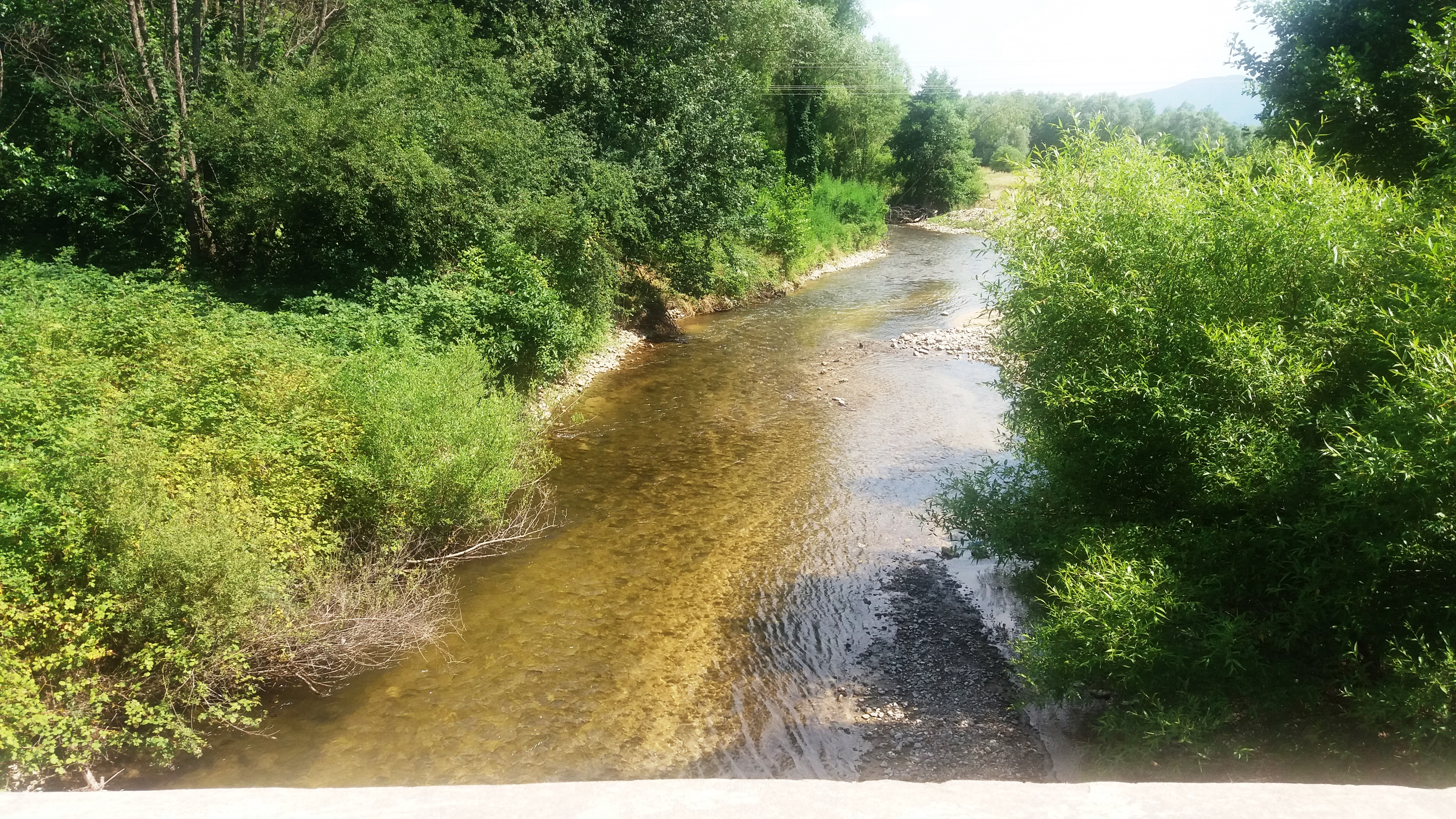
Upper course in Karlovo Valley

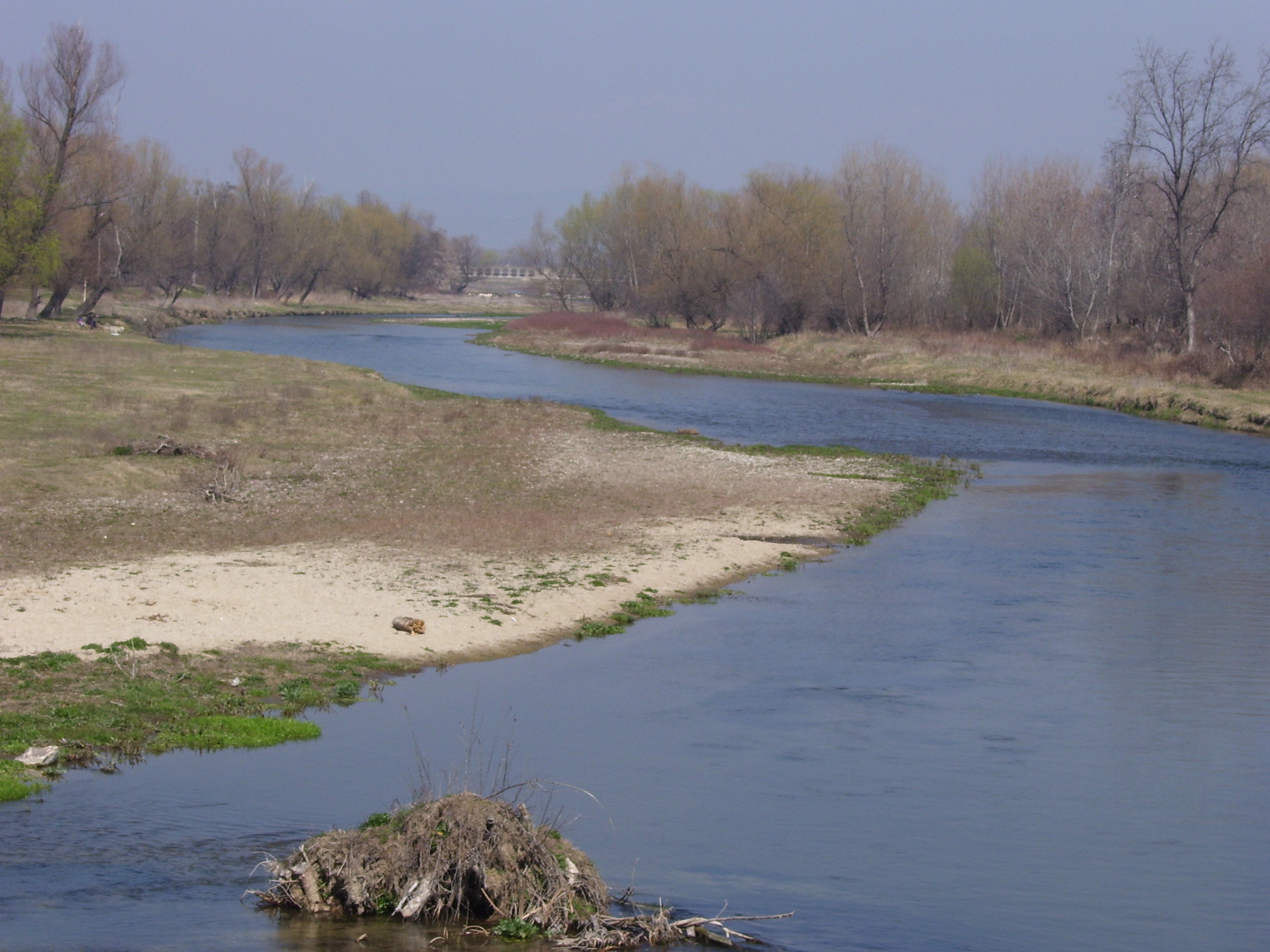
Middle course in the Upper Thracian Plain
