= Karlovo Valley =

Valley in Bulgaria

- Valley
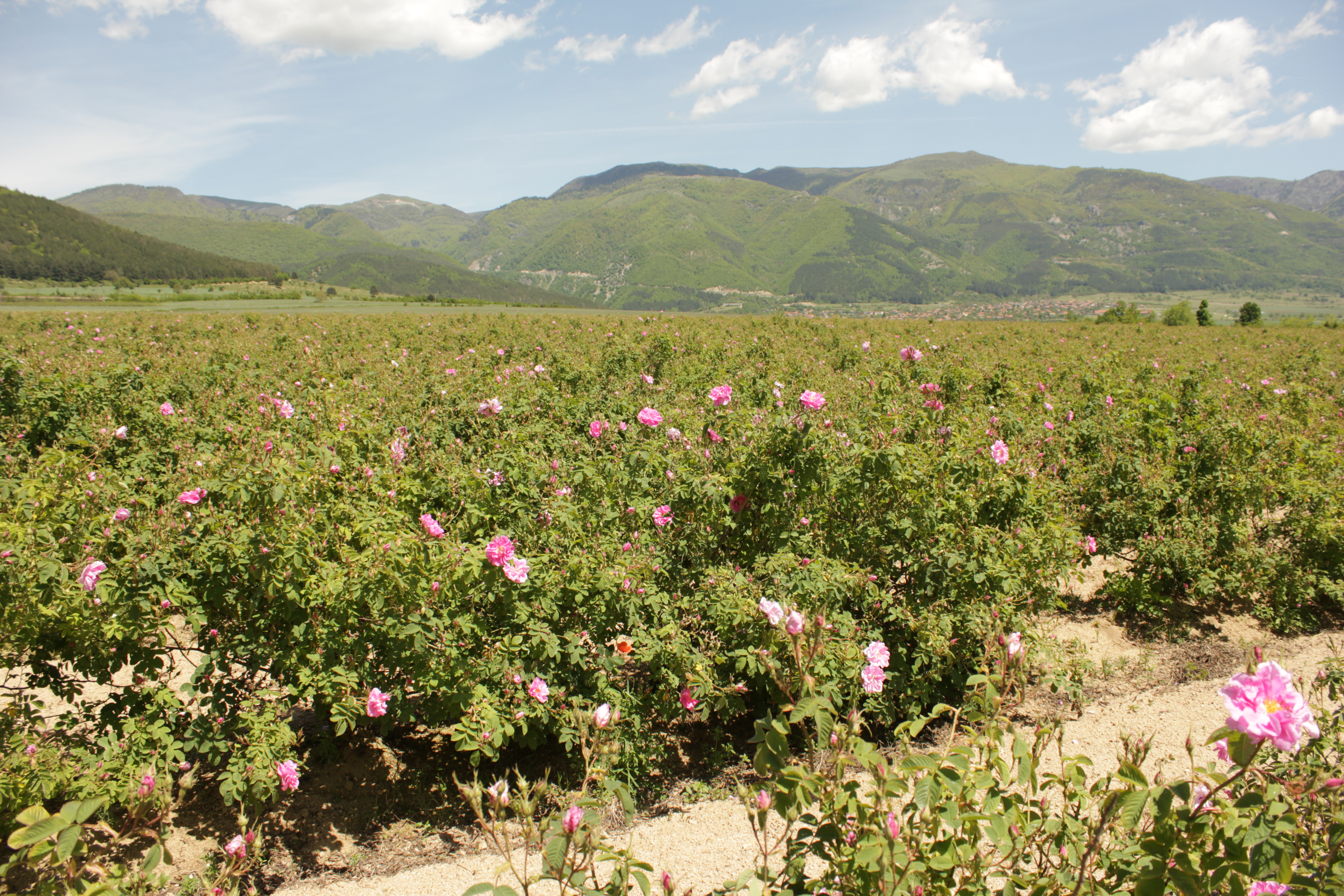
- Roses in Karlovo Valley
- Interactive map of Karlovo Valley
- Coordinates: 42°38′0″N 24°48′0″E
- Location: Bulgaria

Area
  - Total: 280 km^{2} (110 sq mi)

Dimensions
  - Length: 37 km (23 mi)
  - Width: 15 km (9.3 mi)

Karlovo Valley (Bulgarian: Карловска котловина) is situated in central Bulgaria. It is named after the town of Karlovo, its main settlement. It is the sixth of the eleven Sub-Balkan valleys in direction west–east. Together with the neighbouring Kazanlak Valley, it forms part of the Rose Valley region.

== Geography ==
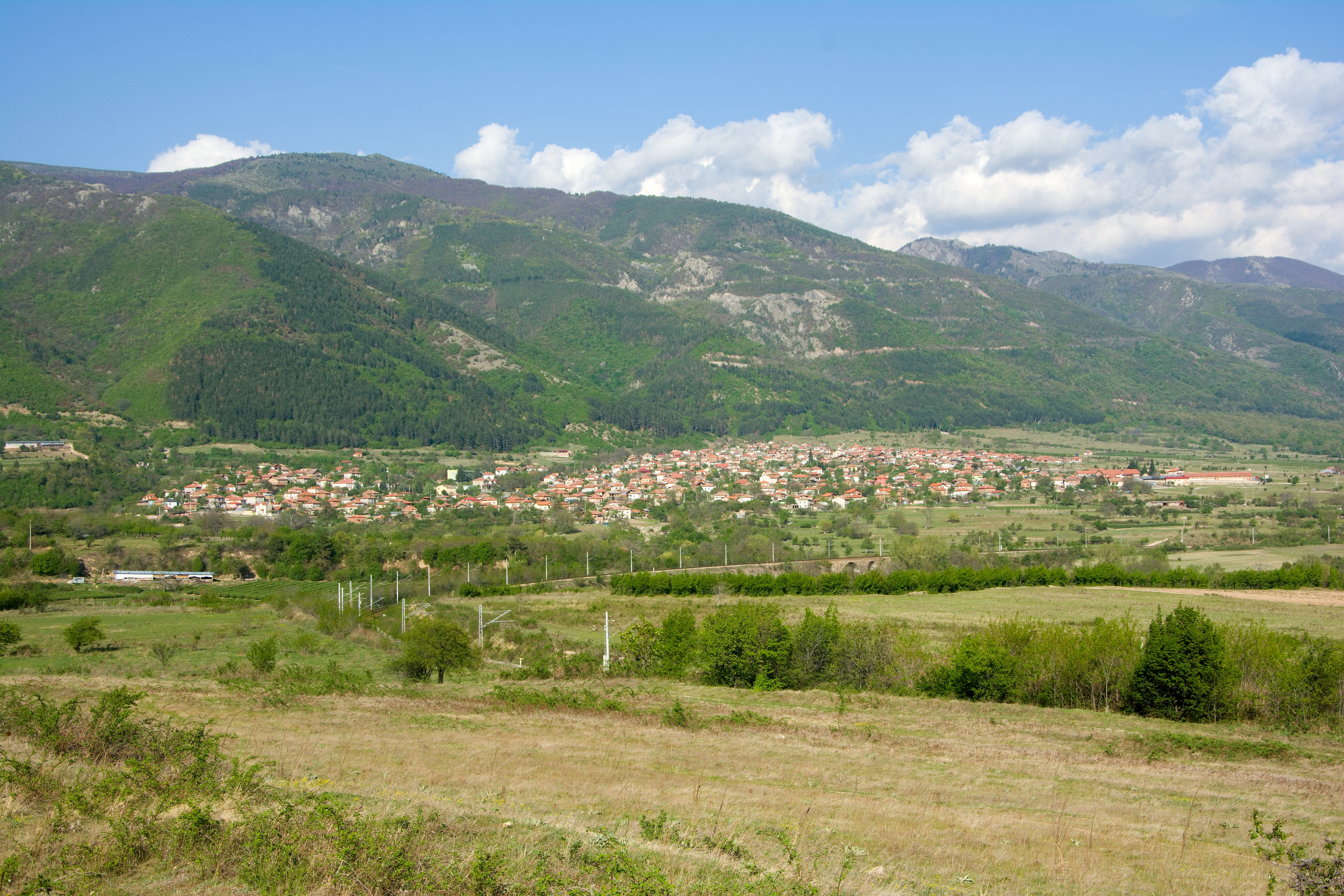
A view of the valley near Hristo Danovo

The valley is enclosed between the Zlatitsa–Teteven, Troyan and Ravnets divisions of the Balkan Mountains to the north and the Sashtinska Sredna Gora and Sarnena Serdna Gora divisions of the Sredna Gora mountain range to the south. The highest summits of both mountain ranges, Botev (2,376 m) and Golyam Bogdan (1,604 m) respectively, rise over Karlovo Valley. The Koznitsa Ridge (1,092 m) separates it from the higher Zlatitsa–Pirdop Valley to the west, while the Strazhata Ridge (610 m) forms the divide with the Kazanlak Valley to the east.

Karlovo Valley spans a territory of 280 km^{2}. It reaches a length of 37 km in direction west–east; the width varies between 2 km in the west and 15 km at its widest in the east. The average altitude is about 400 m with inclination in southern direction. There are two small intra-basin granite elevations in the southeast, Konyat (392 m) and Momini Gardi (491 m).

Morphographically, the valley forms a large and deep graben structure stretching from west to east. It is bounded by the Sub-Balkan and Karlovo synclines to the north and south. It is filled with Pliocene and Quaternary sediments. At the foot of the Balkan Mountains, the Quaternary sediments form an extensive alluvial fan with a thickness of 40 m to 100 m. The slopes of the Balkan Mountains are steep, composed of granites and Paleozoic crystalline rocks, partially deforested and eroded in many places. The slopes of Sredna Gora are gentle, composed of granites and covered with oak and hornbeam forests.

The valley is in the transitional zone between the temperate continental climatic zone and the continental Mediterranean zone. The mean annual temperature is 11.9 °C with average January temperature of 0.5 °C and average July temperature of 22.6 °C. The annual precipitation is about 680 mm. The soils are mostly alluvial and cinnamon.

The valley is drained by the river Stryama of the Maritsa drainage and several of its left tributaries, including the Byala reka, the Stara reka and the Dermendere. There are mineral springs at the town of Banya.

== History ==
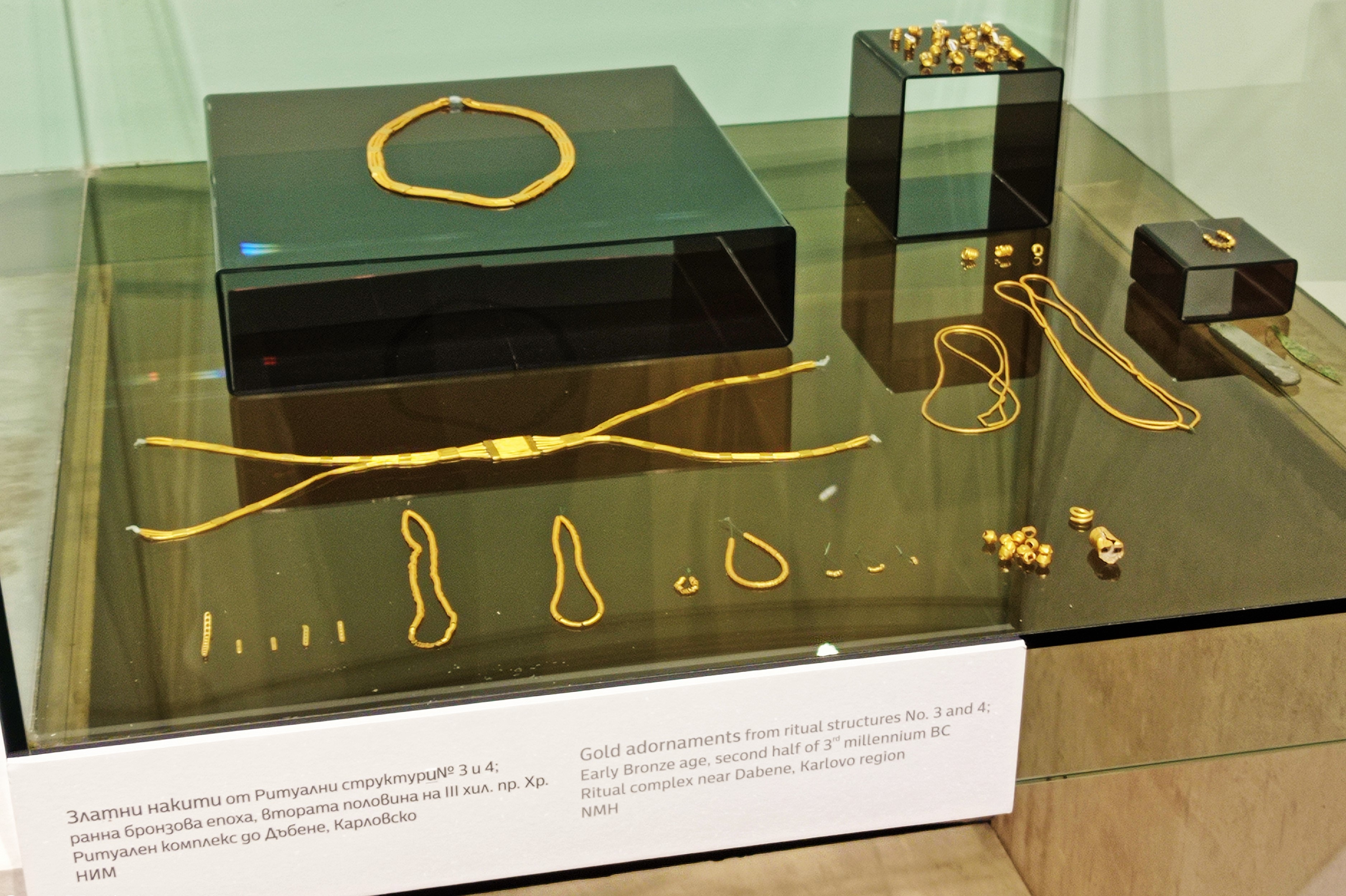
Part of the Dabene Treasure

The valley had been continuously inhabited since the Neolithic as evidenced by the remains of a settlement near Karlovo dated to the 6th millennium BC. It was part of a developed local Bronze Age culture. The Dabene Treasure dated to the second half of the 3rd millennium BC was discovered near the homonymous village. It consists of over 15,000 small pieces of finely crafted gold and is considered to have been linked to the ancestors of the Thracians.

In the Middle Ages there were several settlements and monasteries in the region that were part of the First and Second Bulgarian Empire. It was conquered by the Ottoman Turks in the aftermath of the Bulgarian–Ottoman wars in the late 14th century. By the 19th century the valley, and especially the towns of Karlovo and Sopot, became a prosperous economic hub and a major center of the Bulgarian National Revival. Many important leaders of the Bulgarian awakening were born in Karlovo Valley, including revolutionary and national hero Vasil Levski, writer and national poet Ivan Vazov, general Vladimir Vazov, encyclopedist Ivan Bogorov, enlightener Hristo G. Danov, entrepreneurs Evlogi Georgiev and Hristo Georgiev, and many others.

== Settlements and transportation ==
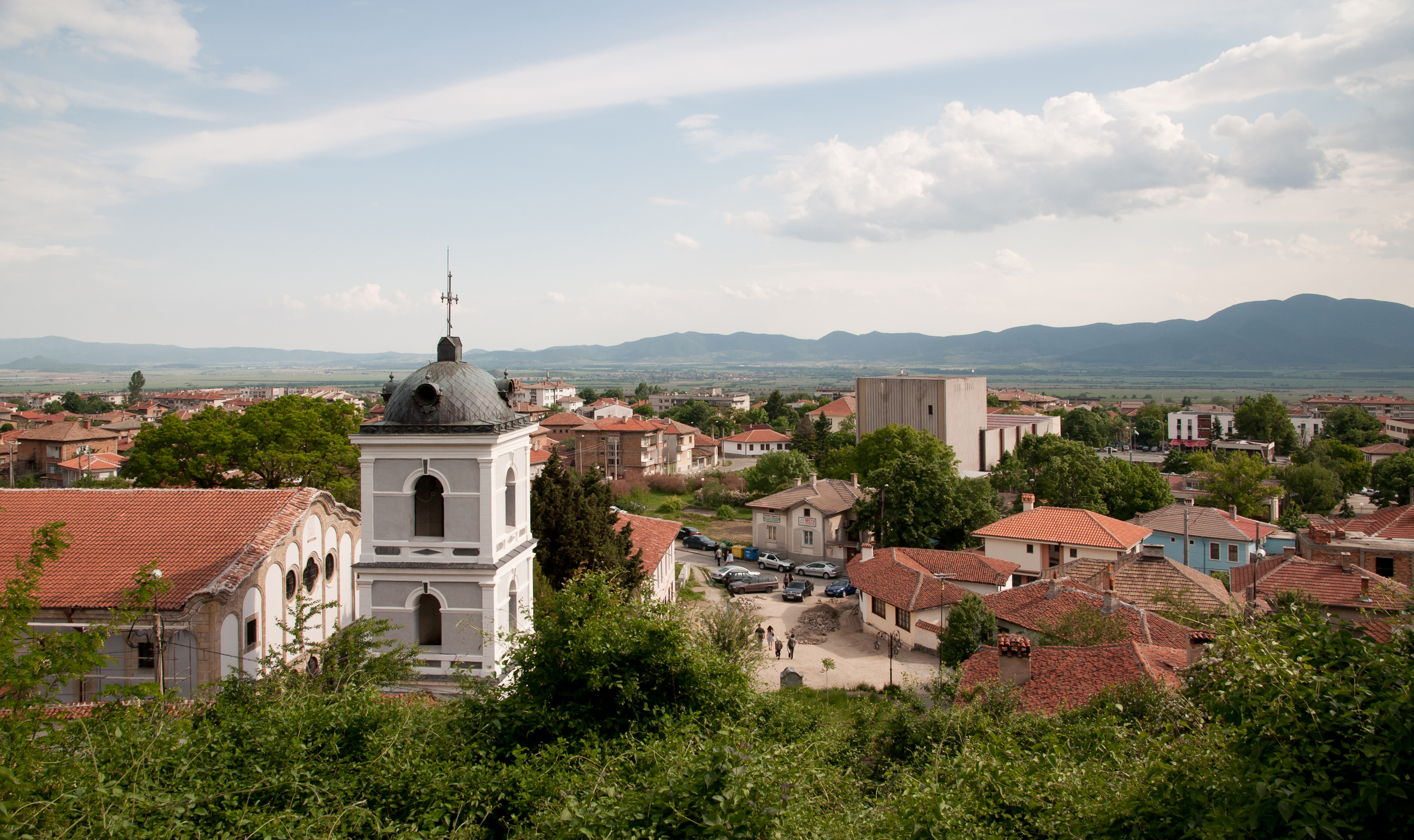
A view of Sopot

Administratively, the valley is situated in Plovdiv Province. There are four towns, Karlovo, Sopot, Klisura and Banya. The villages are 23 — Anevo, Beguntsi, Bogdan, Vasil Levski, Vedrare, Voynyagovo, Gorni Domlyan, Domlyan, Dabene, Iganovo, Karavelovo, Kliment, Kurtovo, Karnare, Marino Pole, Moskovets, Pevtsite, Prolom, Rozino, Slatina, Sokolitsa, Stoletovo and Hristo Danovo. All of the settlements form part of Karlovo Municipality, with the exception of Sopot and Anevo, which are in Sopot Municipality.

The valley is served by four roads of the national network, as well as local roads. From west to east from Klisura to Kalofer it is traversed by a 47 km stretch of the first class I-6 road Gyueshevo–Sofia–Karlovo–Burgas. From north to south runs in its western reaches the final 3 km section of the second class II-35 road Pleven–Lovech–Troyan–Karnare. In the eastern parts of the valley in direction north–south is an 11.4 km section of the second class II-64 road Karlovo–Plovdiv. From southwest to northeast in its eastern reaches is the whole 8.5 km length of the third class III-641 road Banya–Vasil Levski. The town of Karlovo lies 56 km north of regional center Plovdiv and 147 km east of the national capital Sofia.

A section of railway line No. 3 Iliyantsi (Sofia)–Karlovo–Sliven–Karnobat–Varna served by the Bulgarian State Railways crosses the valley in direction west–east between the railway stations of Stryama and Botev. The valley is also traversed by a section of railway line No. 82 Plovdiv–Karlovo between Banya and its terminus at Karlovo Railway Station.

== Economy and tourism ==
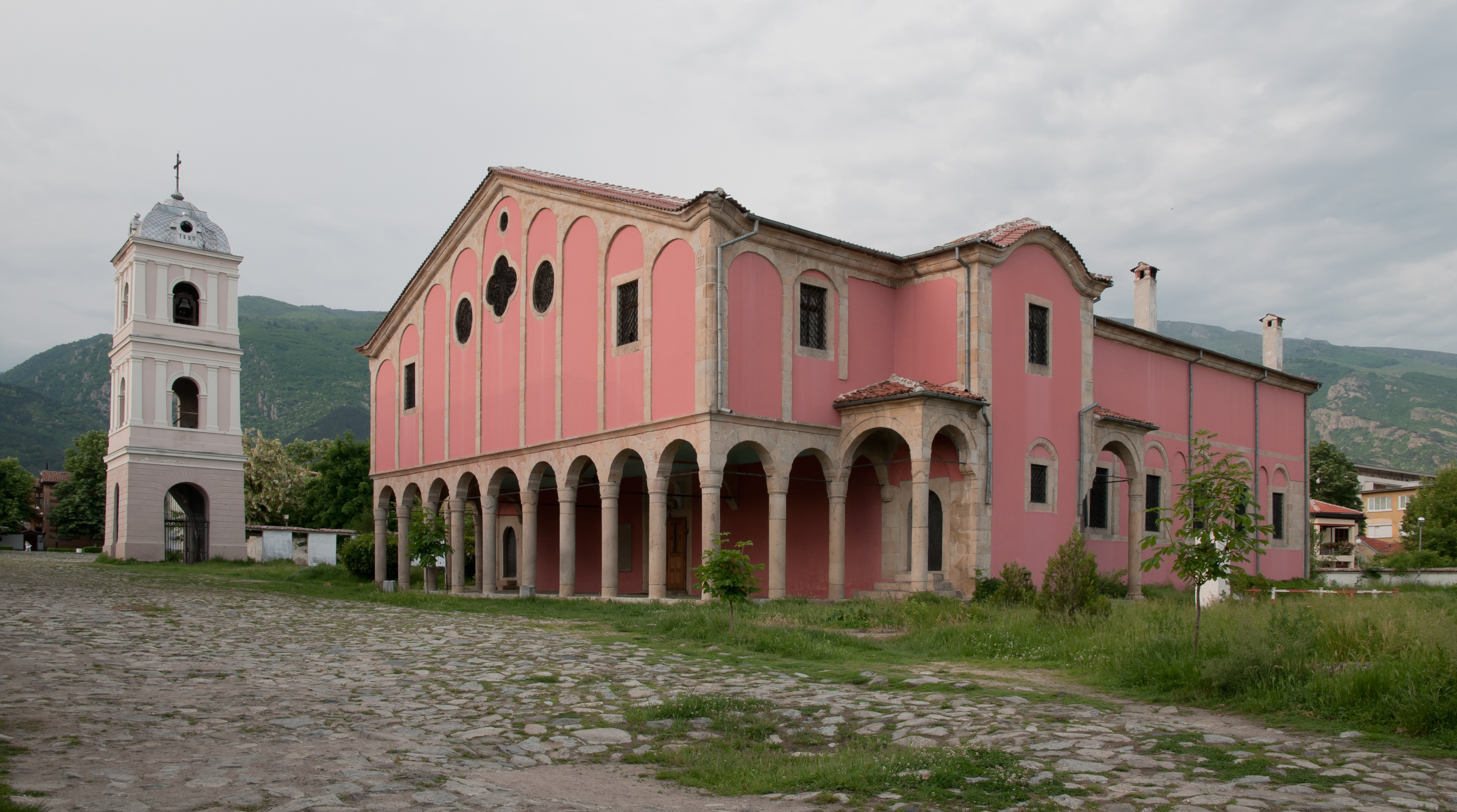
Church of St Nicolas in Karlovo

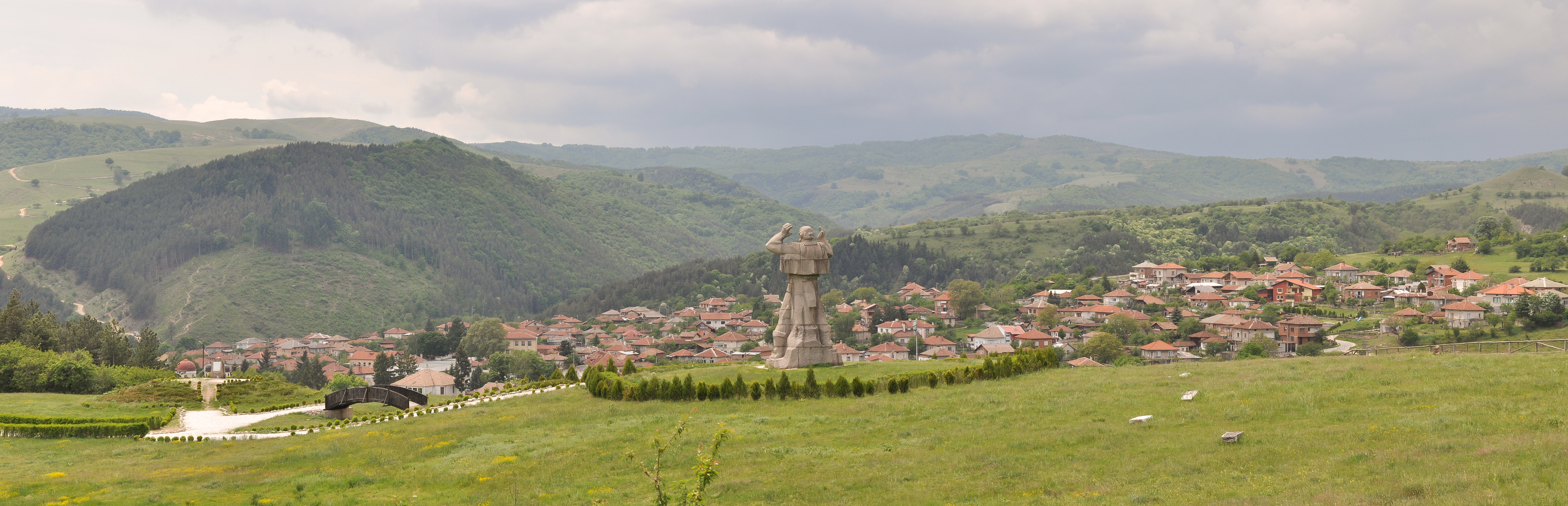
A view of Klisura in the westernmost part of the valley

The valley's main economic hub is Sopot, which produces 54% of the local GDP, compared to 46% for Karlovo Municipality. Sopot is a major industrial center, home of VMZ Sopot — one of the largest companies of the Bulgarian defense industry. The company employs nearly 5,000 people and produces anti-tank guided and unguided missiles, aviation unguided missiles and artillery ammunition. In 2025 VMZ and the German manufacturer Rheinmetall signed a 1 billion euro deal to construct an ammunition factory at the Bulgarian company's site near the village of Iganovo, which will secure 1,000 jobs. Other important industrial manufacturers include the SKF bearing factories in Sopot and Karnare, employing over 1,000 workers, the machine-building company IPO Ltd. in Karlovo, and the cosmetics producer Bulgarian Rose in Karlovo.

There is also a strong military presence, with the 61st Stryama Mechanized Brigade and the Intendant Services being based in the valley.

The valley is fertile and is a center of well-developed agriculture, dominated by industrial crops, such as Rosa × damascena, lavander, mint; nuts, including peanuts, walnuts and almonds; fruits, grapes, vegetables, wheat, etc. The damascene rose, used for the production of rose oil, is among the most important cash crops in the region. It was first introduced in Karlovo Valley in 1712, initially near Klisura and Voynyagovo.

The towns of Karlovo, Sopot and Klisura have preserved many architectural monuments, including the Church of St Nicolas in Karlovo, the Church of the Dormition of the Theotokos in Karlovo, the Church of St Nicolas in Klisura, the Sopot Nunnery of the Blessed Virgin, the House-Museum of Ivan Vazov in Sopot, the House-Museum of Vasil Levski in Karlovo, the Karlovo Municipal Museum of History, the Vasil Levski Monument in Karlovo, and a number of national revival style houses. On a high promontory of the Balkan Mountains facing the valley rise the ruins of the Anevo Fortress, also known as Kopsis, an important stronghold of the Second Bulgarian Empire in the 13th-14th centuries. Banya Palace, a royal villa of Tsar Boris III of Bulgaria, is located in the spa town of Banya.

The valley is the starting point for numerous tourist tracks and in the surrounding mountains. The northern slopes are part of Central Balkan National Park, including two its nature reserves, Stara Reka and Steneto.

== Sources ==
- Георгиев (Georgiev), Владимир (Vladimir) (1982). Енциклопедия България. Том III. И-Л [Encyclopaedia Bulgaria. Volume III. I-L] (in Bulgarian). и колектив. София (Sofia): Издателство на БАН (Bulgarian Academy of Sciences Press).
- Мичев (Michev), Николай (Nikolay); Михайлов (Mihaylov), Цветко (Tsvetko); Вапцаров (Vaptsarov), Иван (Ivan); Кираджиев (Kiradzhiev), Светлин (Svetlin) (1980). Географски речник на България [Geographic Dictionary of Bulgaria] (in Bulgarian). София (Sofia): Наука и култура (Nauka i kultura).
