= Dabene Treasure =

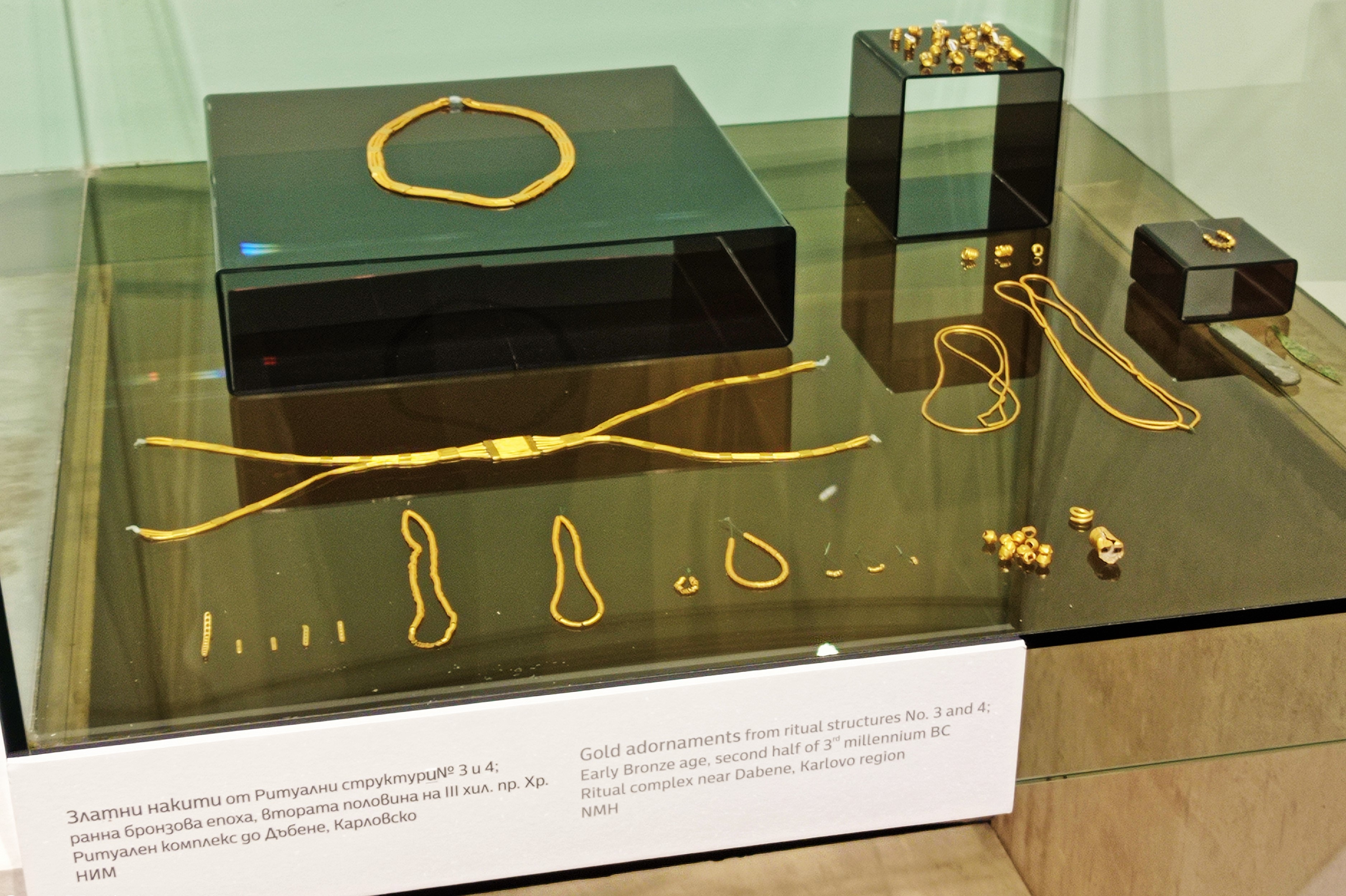
Part of the Dabene Treasure

The Dabene Treasure (Bulgarian: Дъбенското съкровище) was unearthed in 2004 near the village of Dabene in Karlovo Municipality, Plovdiv Province, central Bulgaria. The excavations were led by the archaeologist Martin Hristov. Other elements of the treasure were discovered in 2004-2007.

The excavations in the area began after two archaeologists from the National Historical Museum met a local woman with an exquisite golden necklace found by her husband while ploughing with his tractor. The couple was unaware of the origins of the jewel and cooperated with the archaeologists.

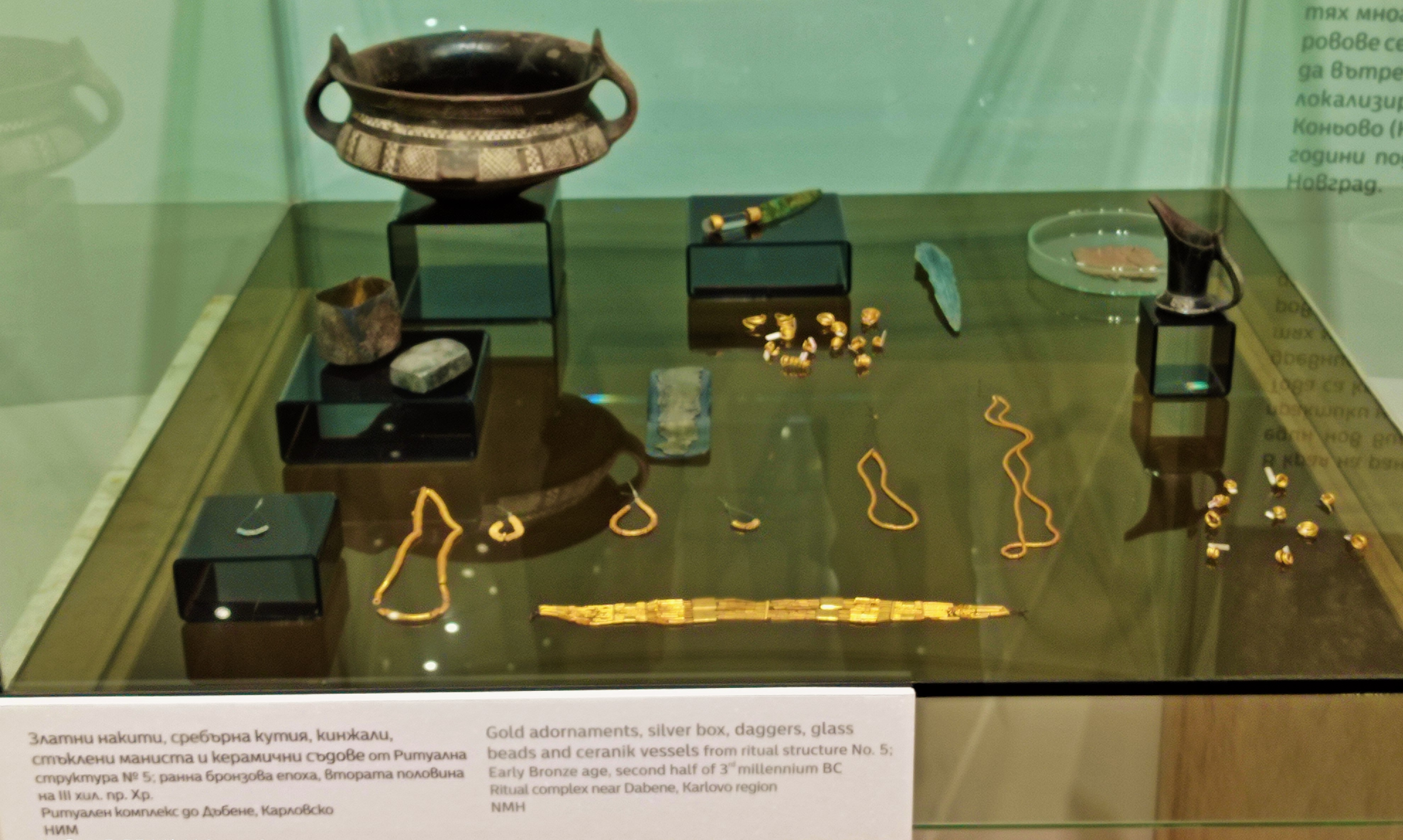
Finds from Dabene

The whole treasure consists of 20,000 gold jewelry items from 18 to 23 carats. The most important of them was a dagger made of gold and copper-silver with an unusual edge. The treasure was dated to the second half of the 3rd millennium B.C. The scientists suggest that the Karlovo Valley where Dabene is located used to be a major crafts center which exported golden jewelry all over Europe. That conclusion was made because the golden elements were not discovered in a burial mound and there are no remains of bones or ceramics and therefore the elements were not burial gifts.

The treasure was unearthed in perfect condition and was exhibited in the National Historical Museum without restoration on 9 August 2009.

== Gallery ==
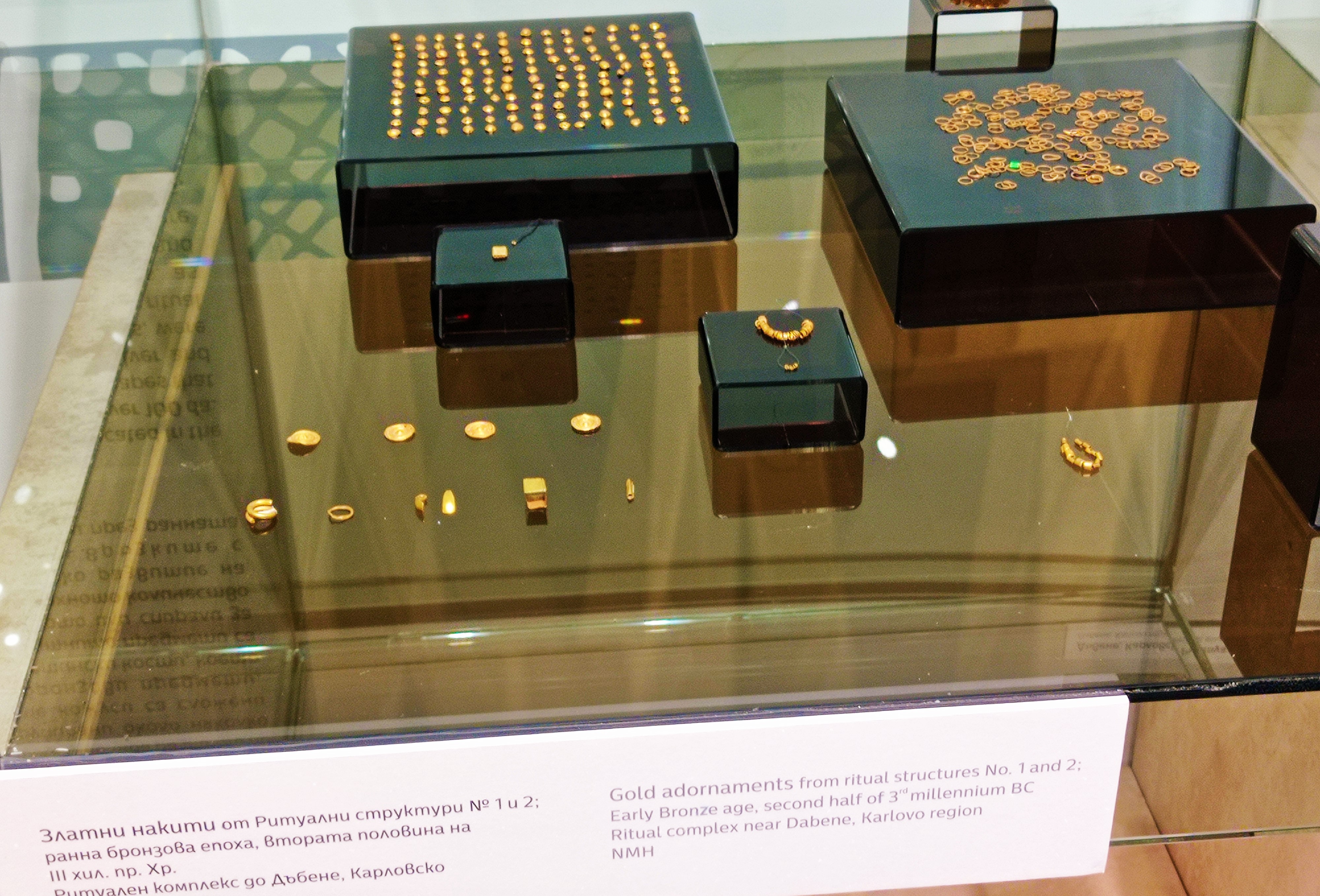
Finds from Dabene

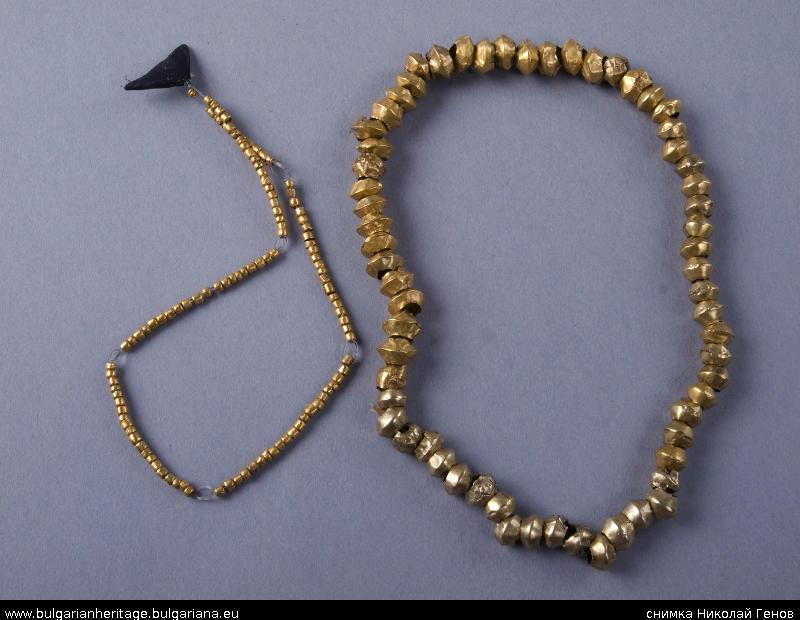
Necklace

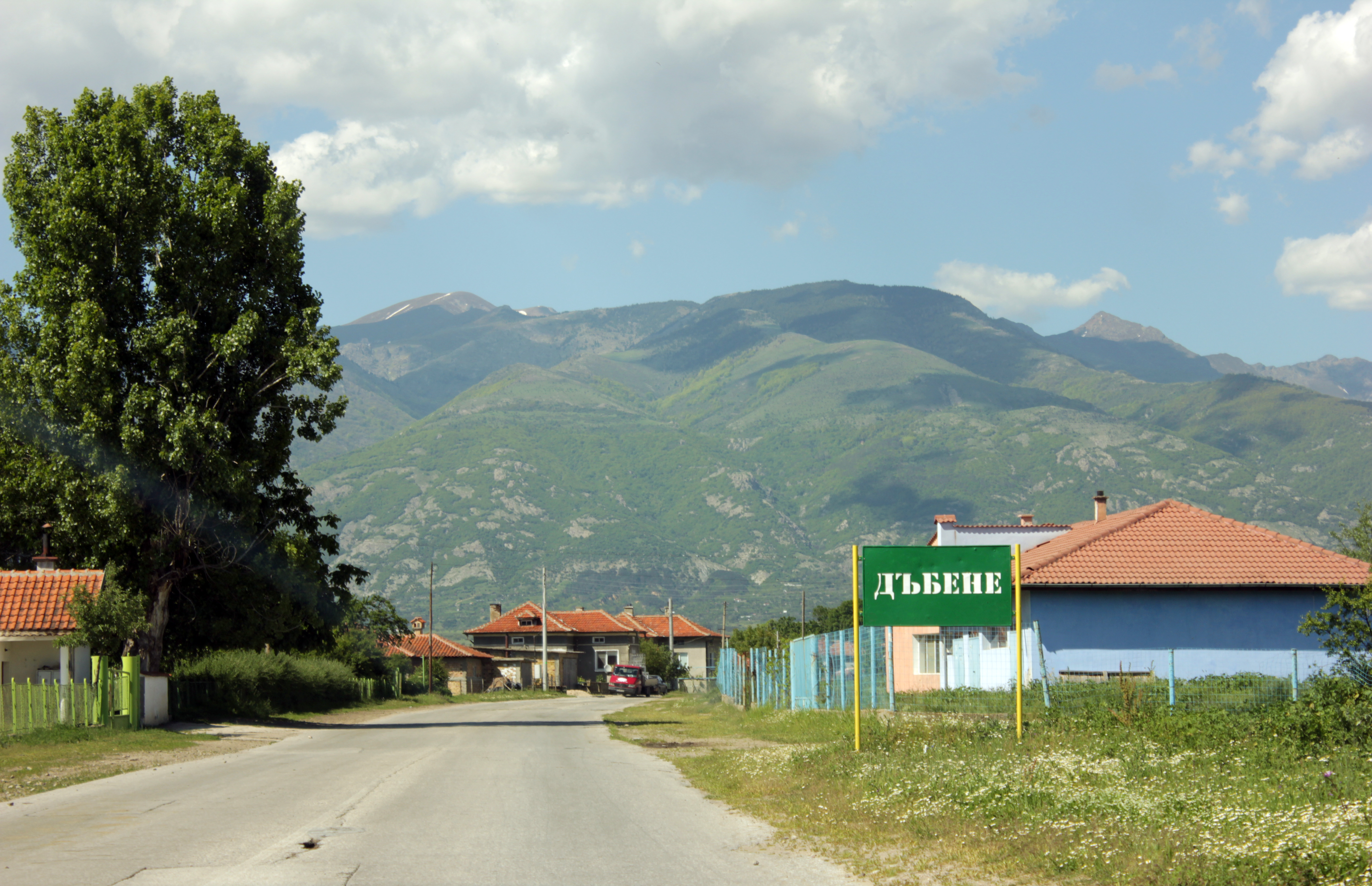
Entrance to Dabene

== See also ==
- History of Bulgaria
- Valchitran Treasure
- Bronze Age Europe
- Vučedol culture
- Únětice culture
