= Voynyagovo =

Voynyagovo Войнягово
- Village
- Location in Bulgaria
- Coordinates: 42°34′N 24°45′E
- Country: Bulgaria
- Province (Oblast): Plovdiv
- Municipality: Karlovo

Government
  - Mayor: Todor Tankovski (Independent)

Area
  - Total: 34.198 km^{2} (13.204 sq mi)
- Elevation: 318 m (1,043 ft)

Population (2013-06-15)
  - Total: 1,158
  - Density: 33.86/km^{2} (87.70/sq mi)
- Time zone: UTC+2 (EET)
  - Summer (DST): UTC+3 (EEST)
- Postal Code: 4347
- Area code: 031393
- Vehicle registration: РВ
- Website: http://www.voynyagovo.free.bg

Voynyagovo (Bulgarian: Войнягово) is a village in central southern Bulgaria, part of Karlovo Municipality, Plovdiv Province. As of 2008, it has a population of 1,260. The village lies in the Karlovo Valley at the foothills of the Sredna Gora mountain range, 318 metres (1,043 ft) above sea level.

== History ==
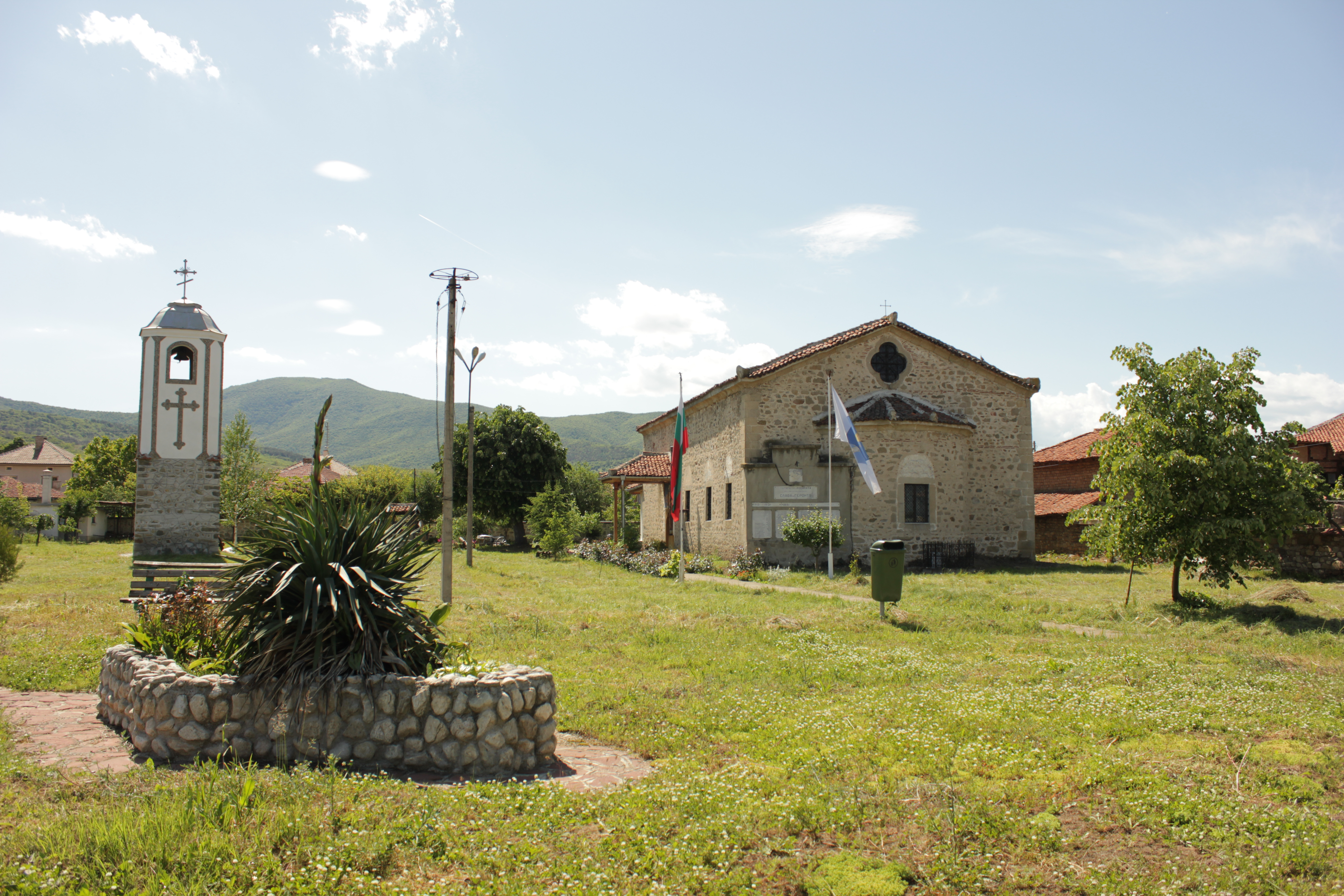
The church of Voynyagovo

According to folk tradition, the founder of the village was the boyar Voyneg, who united the huts scattered along Sredna Gora in a village. The village in the time of the Second Bulgarian Empire had the status of a military settlement. By 1829 part of the population of Voynyagovo emigrated with the Russian troops of Gen. Dibic-Zabalkanski during their withdrawal in Bessarabia, in the villages of Kamber and Baskoy (now Romania). Revolutionary and national hero Vasil Levski was a teacher in the village, and a Vasil Levski Culture Centre was established in 1900.

== Religion ==
There is a Church of Saint Dimitar, an Orthodox church, in the village.
