= Sopot, Plovdiv Province =

Sopot Сопот
- Town
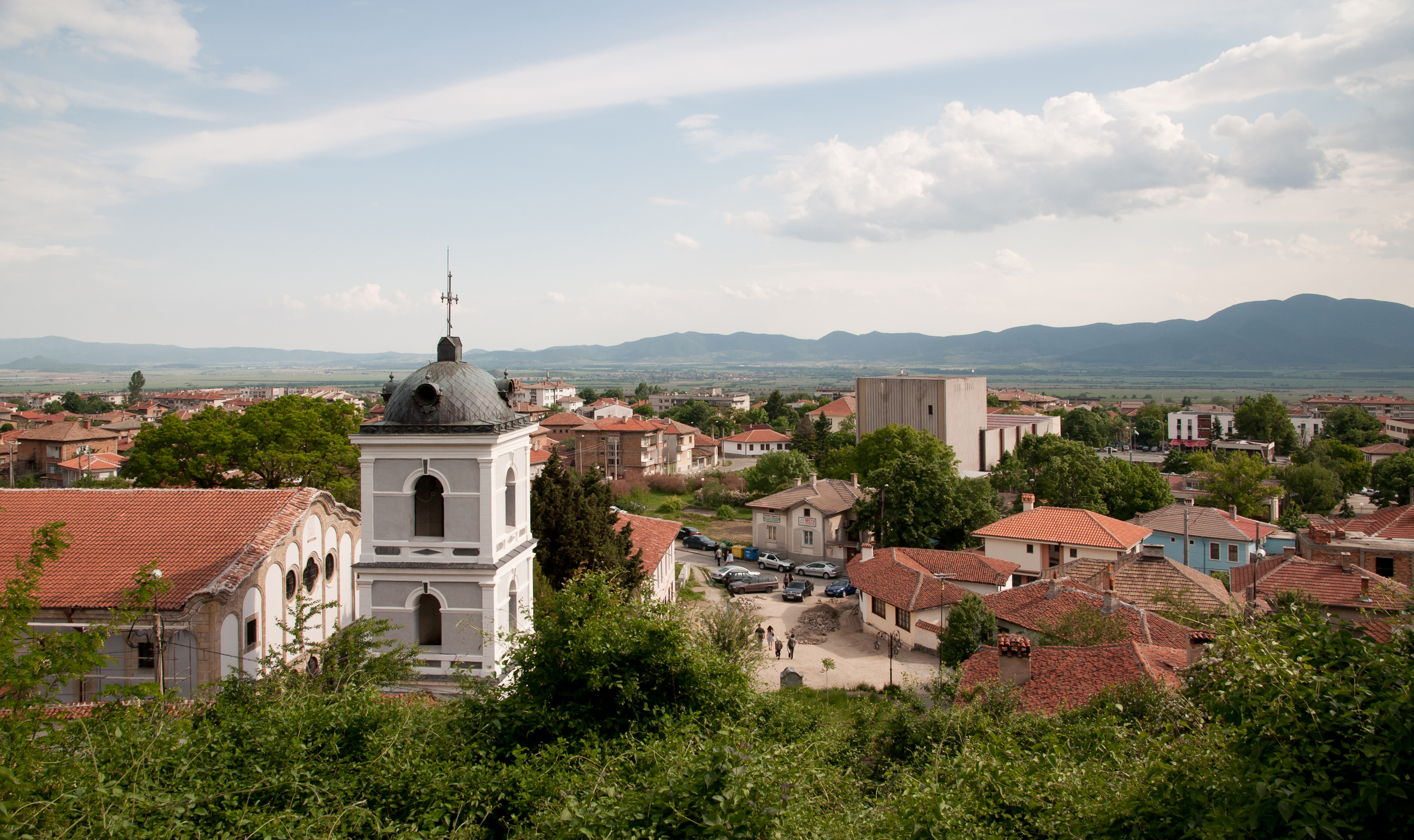

- Location of Sopot
- Coordinates: 42°39′N 24°45′E
- Country: Bulgaria
- Province (Oblast): Plovdiv

Government
  - Mayor: Alexandar Apostolov (NMSII)
- Elevation: 417 m (1,368 ft)

Population (2011-02-01)
  - Total: 8,754
- Time zone: UTC+2 (EET)
  - Summer (DST): UTC+3 (EEST)
- Postal Code: 4330
- Area code: 03134

Sopot (Bulgarian: Сопот [ˈsɔpot]) is a Bulgarian town situated in the fertile sub-Balkan Karlovo Valley, which is the western part of the famous Rose Valley, immediately below the steep southern slopes of the Troyan Balkan Mountains. Sopot is part of Plovdiv Province and is the administrative centre of a municipality of the same name.

== Geography ==
It lies 2 km west of Karlovo, 136 km east of Sofia, 63 km north of Plovdiv, and 61 km south of Troyan. It is the birthplace of arguably the best known and most renowned Bulgarian novelist, Ivan Vazov. Sopot is also a machine building centre and the site of VMZ Sopot, one the largest armament manufactures in Bulgaria.

== History ==
According to Konstantin Jireček, the toponym is of Proto-Slavic origin, as indicated by the large number of identical placenames all around the Slavic world. There is information about the locality dating back to the Ottoman rule. During the Bulgarian National Revival (18th and 19th centuries) it was called "Golden Sopot" because of its flourishing development in the crafts and trade. The citizens of Sopot manufactured homespun, braids, fur and leather of high quality and traded predominantly round the Ottoman Empire.

During the struggle for liberation in 1877 the town was largely destroyed by fire and its population was slaughtered or expelled. The town was named Vazovgrad between 1950 and 1965 after which it obtained its present name again.

The pioneering Bulgarian educator Nedelya Petkova (1826–1894) began her career a student at the monastery school of the "Holy presentation of the Blessed Virgin" convent in Sopot.

== Population ==
The population is almost exclusively Christian, mostly Eastern Orthodox but with some Evangelical and Roman Catholic families.

According to the 2011 census, 7,973 out of 8,754 inhabitants declared their ethnicity. Around 96.2% of those, or 7,669 people, are ethnic Bulgarians. There are 145 Roma people (1.8%) and 20 ethnic Turks (0.3%) living in the town of Sopot.

== Religion ==
The population of Sopot professes mostly Eastern Orthodox Christianity. There are several families Roman Catholics and evangelicals. No Muslims.

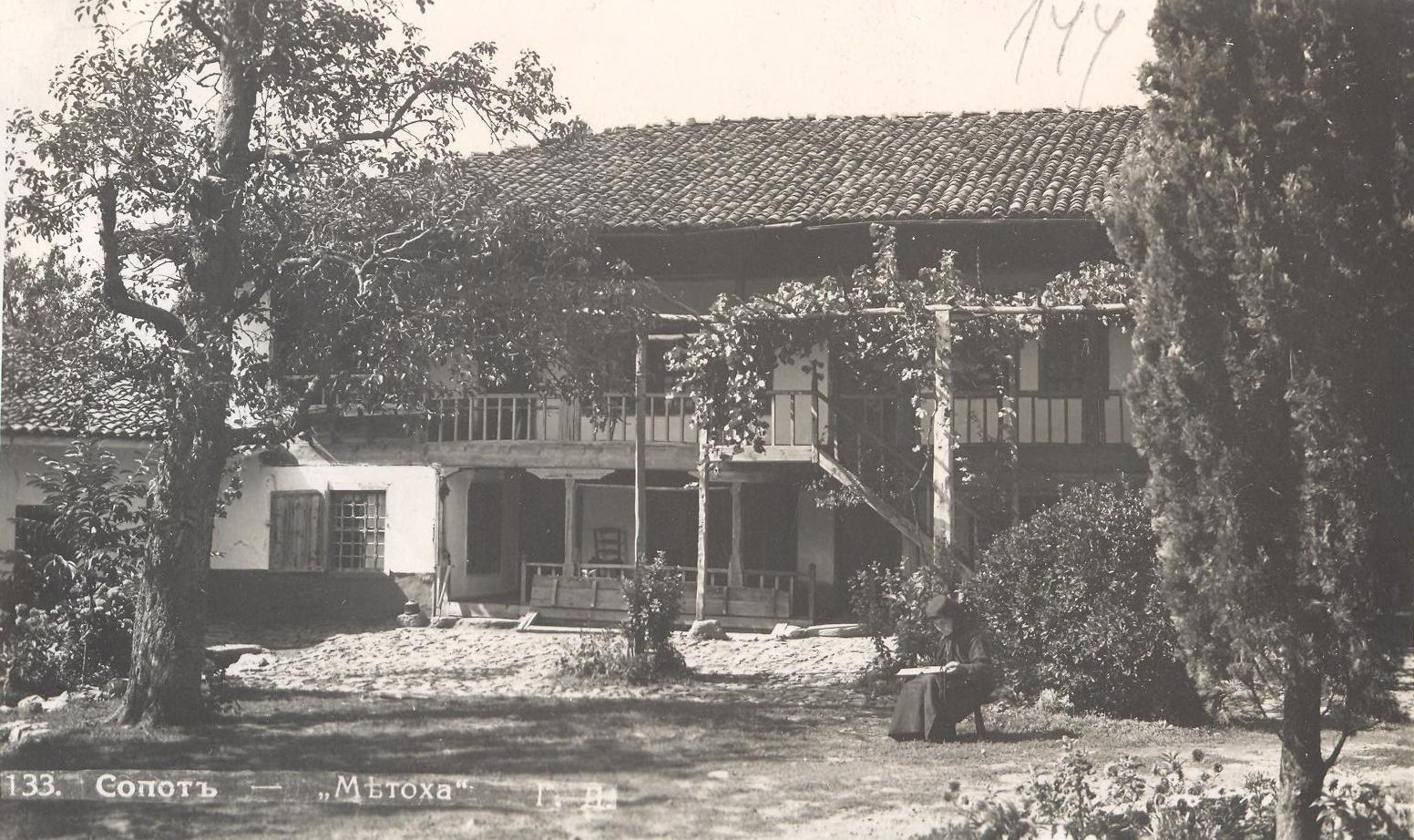
Sopot Monastery

- Sopot monastery "St. Spas" or Sopot monastery for men "Vaznesenie Gospodne" (Ascension Day)(in its present form since 1879 ), in which on 7 December 1858 Vasil Levski became a monk. – The exact date of the occurrence of the monastery is not known. It is believed that was founded in the 13th century. Most likely "St. Spas" is the successor of the previous monastery in the Sopot area – "St. Trinity", extinct about the 11th or 12th century. The "St. Spas" monastery was "royal"- i.e. it was endowed with rights and property by Smilets of Bulgaria himself. These certificates were kept in the monastery until 1870. After that they were transmitted to Nayden Gerov for publishing. During the Ottoman rule of Bulgaria the church was burned and destroyed many times. After its restoration in 1870 it was painted by the artist George Danchev, a close friend of Vasil Levski. During the Russo-Turkish War (1877–78), the church was destroyed again as only the altar survived, but the eyes of the saints were gouged by the bayonets of the Turks. The Church and the fountain of the monastery were restored again in 1879 by Abbot Raphail, whose grave is now behind the altar. By the south wall the church can be seen the great bell, cast in Craiova in 1873 and donated to the monastery by Sopot citizens living in Romania.
- Nunnery "Vavedenie Bogorodichno" (Blessed Virgin),dating from 1665 – one of the 100 Tourist Sites of Bulgaria of the Bulgarian Tourist Union. – The monastery church "Blessed Virgin" was built in the 15th century on the site of an old chapel. The monastery itself was founded in 1665 when living quarters were built around the temple. In the southern cell, on the second floor of the monastery, a primary school was housed. On the first floor of the monastery was located the cell of the Abbess – Hristina. Her cell was the entrance to Vasil Levski's hideout. In 1877 the monastery and the town were burnt down and the Abbess was brutally slaughtered by the Turks. From the monastery survived the temple, the hiding place of Vasil Levski, the fountain (1852), part of the cells and the old vine, which is considered to be one of the oldest in Bulgaria and is over 350 years old. The monastery was rebuilt after the Liberation of Bulgaria.

== Education ==
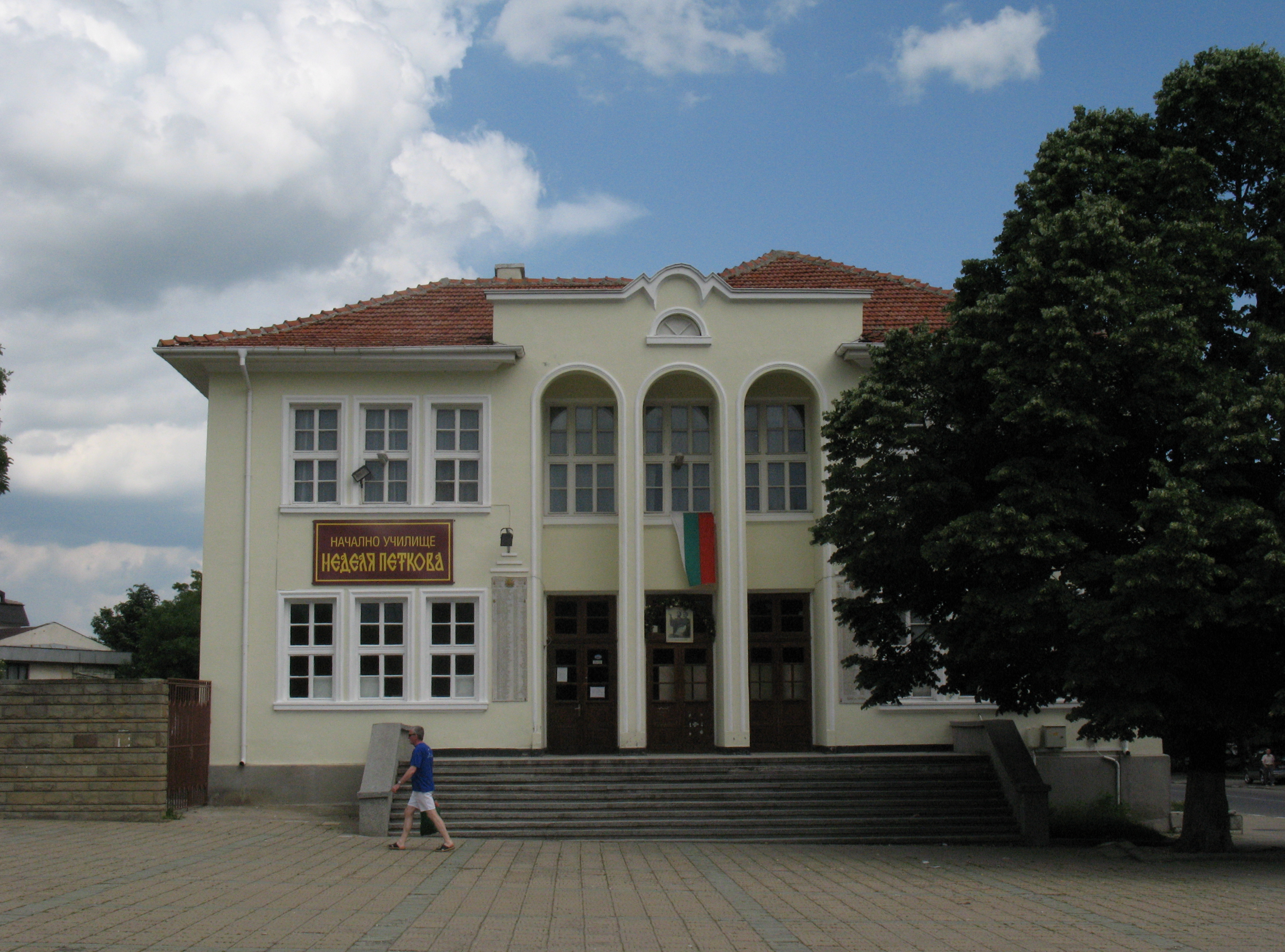
Nedelya Petkova`s school

- General Vladimir Zaimov`s high school (est. 1967)
- Ivan Vazov`s high school
- Nedelya Petkova`s school

== Culture center Ivan Vazov ==
The culture center is established in 1871. Since 1944 became a culture institute. The library had more than 14500 books. In 1970 were created a monument of Ivan Vazov.

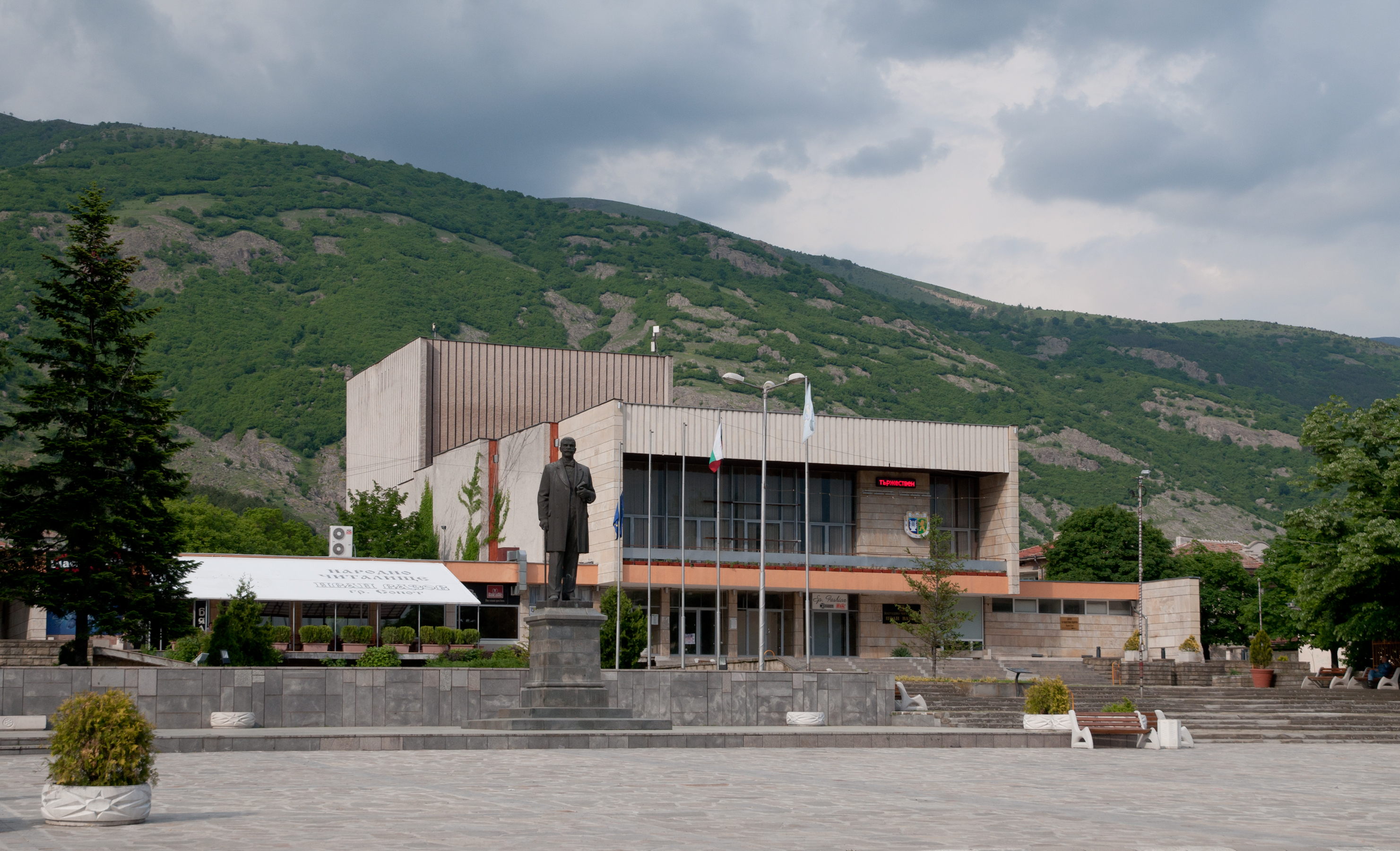
Culture center Ivan Vazov

== Attractions ==
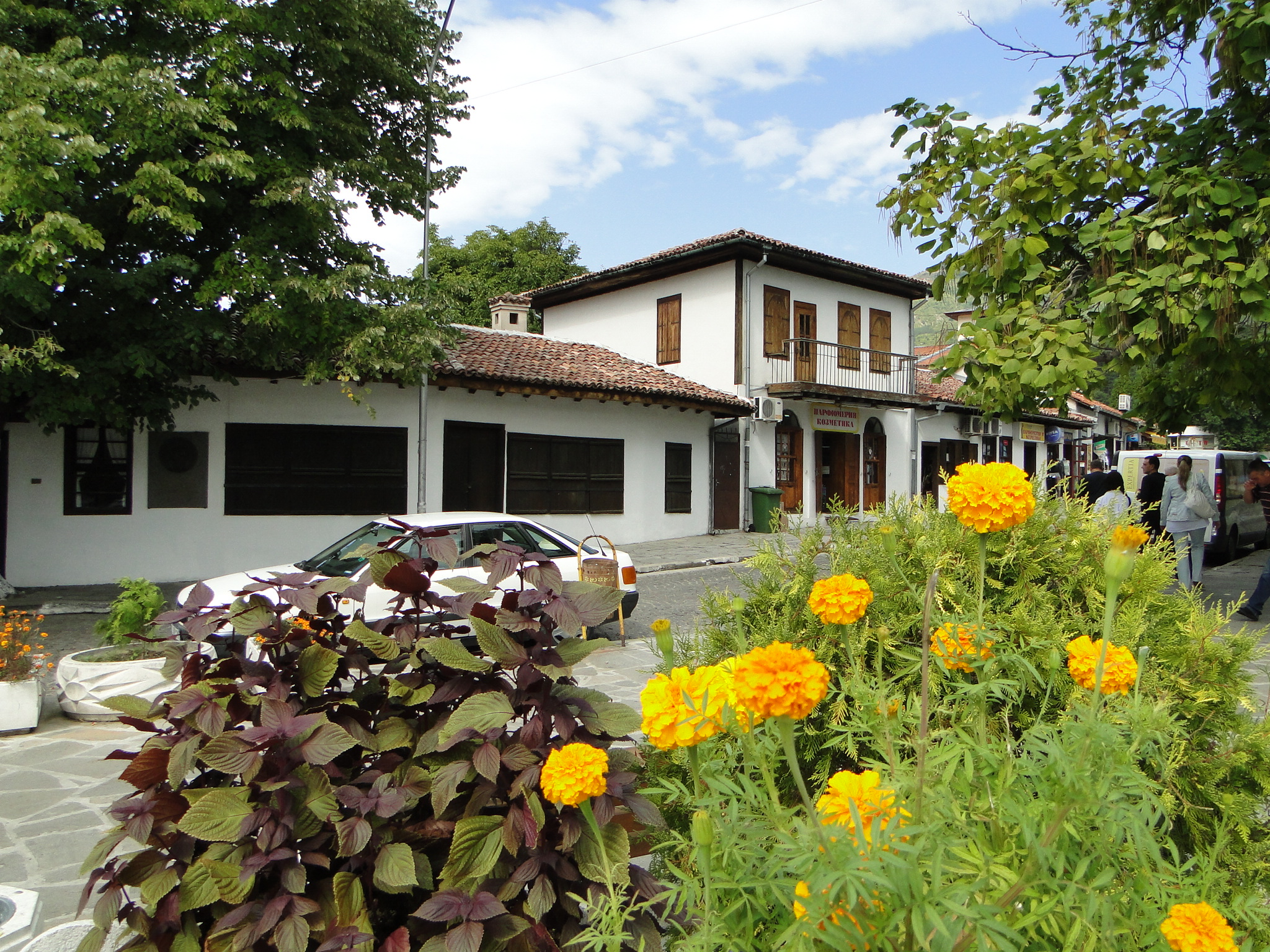
House of Ivan Vazov

- House-Museum of Ivan Vazov. Ivan Vazov was born on 9 July 1850 in Sopot in the old house of his kind built in the 18th century by his grandfather. It was burned in July 1877 during the Russo-Turkish War (1877–78). In 1920, the eve of the anniversary celebrations to commemorate the 70th anniversary and 50 years of literary activity of Vazov, among the poet's friends in Sofia started the idea to restore his native home. The construction of the house began in 1931. The interior was designed under the leadership of Stefan Kostov – the Director of the Ethnographic Museum in Sofia. It was based on information from the Vazov brothers and Vala-Vazova Fetvadzhieva. On 6 June 1935 the house was officially opened as a museum. In 1964, the house-museum "Ivan Vazov" in Sopot was declared a cultural monument with national importance. On the occasion of 120th birth anniversary of the poet, on 8 July 1970 opened the exposure to the life and creative time in his home, built next to the house building. The rich fund, which has the house-museum "Ivan Vazov", recalls the most important periods in the life of the writer: his childhood in Sopot, where he completed his education, his work as assistant teacher in Kalofer with Botyo Petkov and teaching in the Diocese school in Plovdiv with Yoakim Gruev. The exhibited manuscripts present his rich literary works created in 1876–1877, when he was a refugee in Romania and published his first poetry works.
- Sopot Craft’s center "Esnaf" (founded in 2005) The ethnographic and craft center "Sopot's Esnaf" is located in two Bulgarian Renaissance houses – "Budinata House" and House "Zagubanski" in the center of the city, where the descendants of the old masters demonstrate and share their experience. It is managed by the "Ivan Vazov" museum and the Association of the Sopot's masters and connoisseurs of arts and crafts. Visitors can review 4 thematic ethnographic collections, and observe the work of the local artisans – engraving, incrustation, weaving and more. Particularly original is the arrangement the living room in the urban style from the late 19th century. In the center of the esnaf there is a cozy shop for traditional crafts from the Sopot School. On the second floor there is an equipped workshop for young people who are interested to learn old crafts. Interest provokes the arrangement of a typical Sopot living room, replicating the style and lifestyle of the late 19th and early 20th century. Visitors can observe craftsmen at work and to learn about customs and traditions of Sopot town.

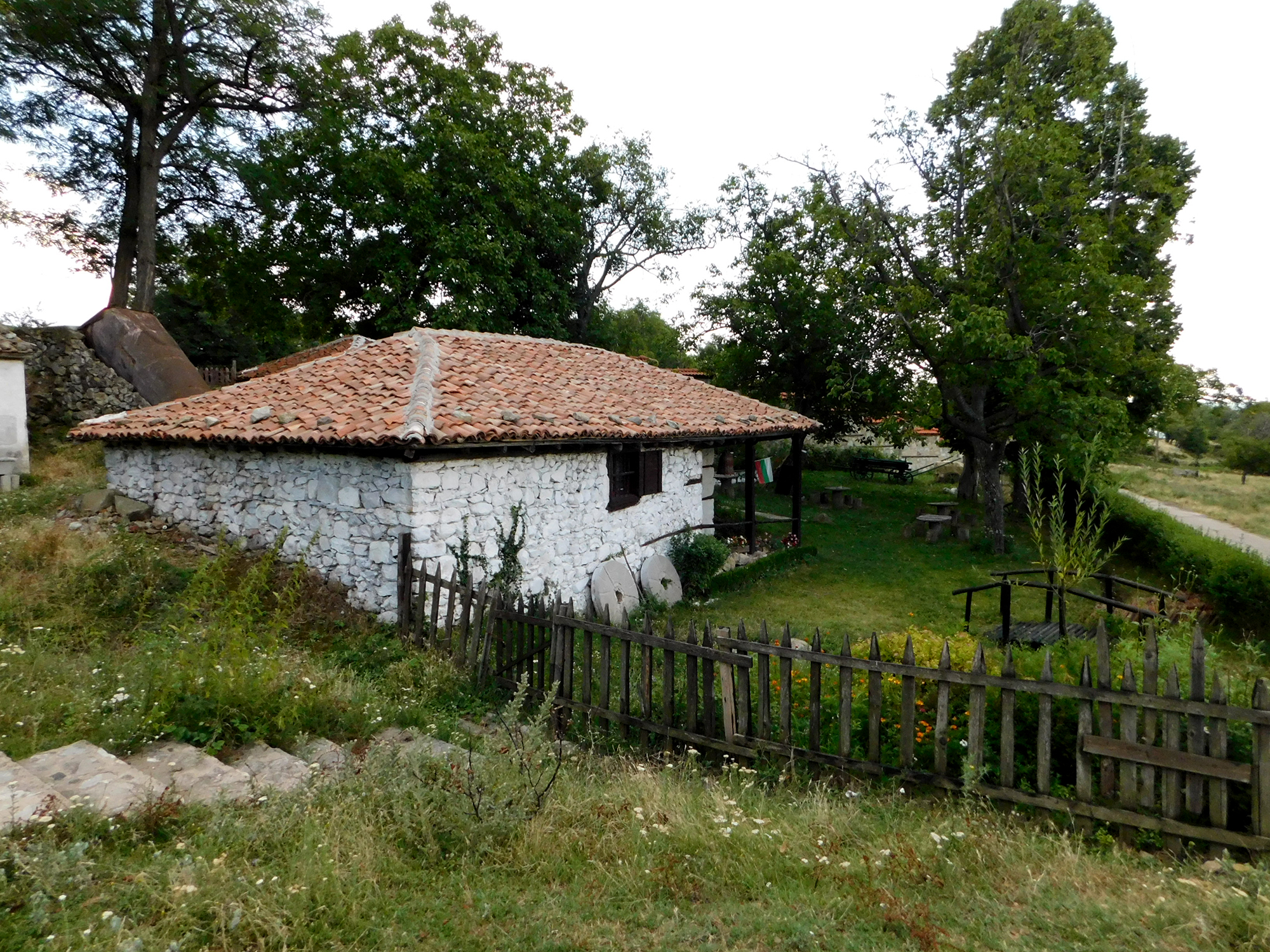
Grandpa Stoyanova water mill

- Grandpa Stoyanova water mill

== Honour ==
Sopot Ice Piedmont on Livingston Island in the South Shetland Islands, Antarctica is named after Sopot.

== Economy ==
- VAZOVSKI MASHINOSTROITELNI ZAVODI – (On English:Vazov mashice factory) – was established in 1940 as a military factory. In the first years the factory start to produce:hand grenades, howitzer rounds, fuzes and others.
