= Slatina, Plovdiv Province =

Slatina Слатина
- Village
- Location of Slatina
- Coordinates: 42°41′N 24°34′E
- Country: Bulgaria
- Province (Oblast): Plovdiv Province
- Municipality: Karlovo

Government
  - Mayor: Nesho Bogdanov

Area
  - Total: 48.715 km^{2} (18.809 sq mi)
- Elevation: 474 m (1,555 ft)

Population (2007-01-01)
  - Total: 1,034
  - Density: 21.23/km^{2} (54.97/sq mi)
- Time zone: UTC+2 (EET)
  - Summer (DST): UTC+3 (EEST)
- Postal Code: 4342
- Website: http://www.slatinabg.free.bg

Slatina (Bulgarian: Слатина) is a village located in the Plovdiv Province, South Central Bulgaria and is part of the Karlovo Municipality.

The village is situated on the northern foothills of the Sredna Gora facing the Karlovo Valley and the Balkan Mountains. The river Stryama flows in the vicinity of Slatina. It is located at 103 km to the east of the capital Sofia.

== Honour ==
Slatina Peak on Smith Island, South Shetland Islands is named after Slatina (Plovdiv Province) and few homonymous Bulgarian settlements.
