= Klisura, Plovdiv Province =

Klisura Клисура
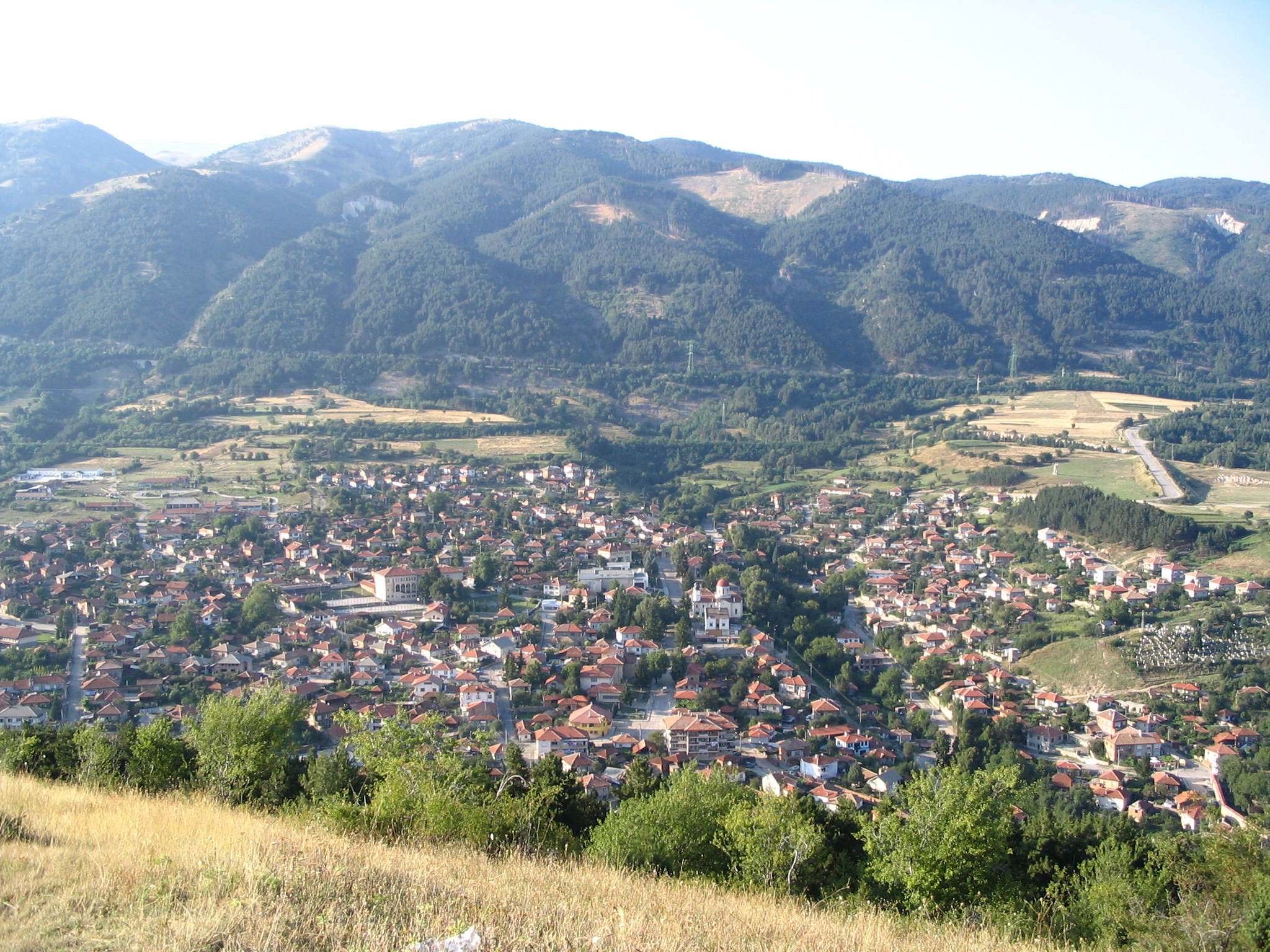
- Klisura seen from Sredna Gora

- Location of Klisura
- Coordinates: 42°42′N 24°27′E
- Country: Bulgaria
- Provinces (Oblast): Plovdiv

Government
  - Mayor: Genka Todorova
- Elevation: 660 m (2,170 ft)

Population (2005-09-13)
  - Total: 1,478
- Time zone: UTC+2 (EET)
  - Summer (DST): UTC+3 (EEST)
- Postal Code: 4341
- Area code: 03137
- License plate: PB

Klisura (Bulgarian: Клисура, pronounced [kliˈsurɐ], lit. 'gorge') is a small town in the Karlovo Municipality of the Plovdiv Province in central Bulgaria. It is situated in the westernmost part of the Karlovo Valley, surrounded by the Balkan Mountains to the north and the Sredna Gora mountain range to the south. As of 2005, its population was 1,478 people. It is located 105 km to the east of Sofia, 35 km west of Karlovo, and 25 km northeast of Koprivshtitsa.

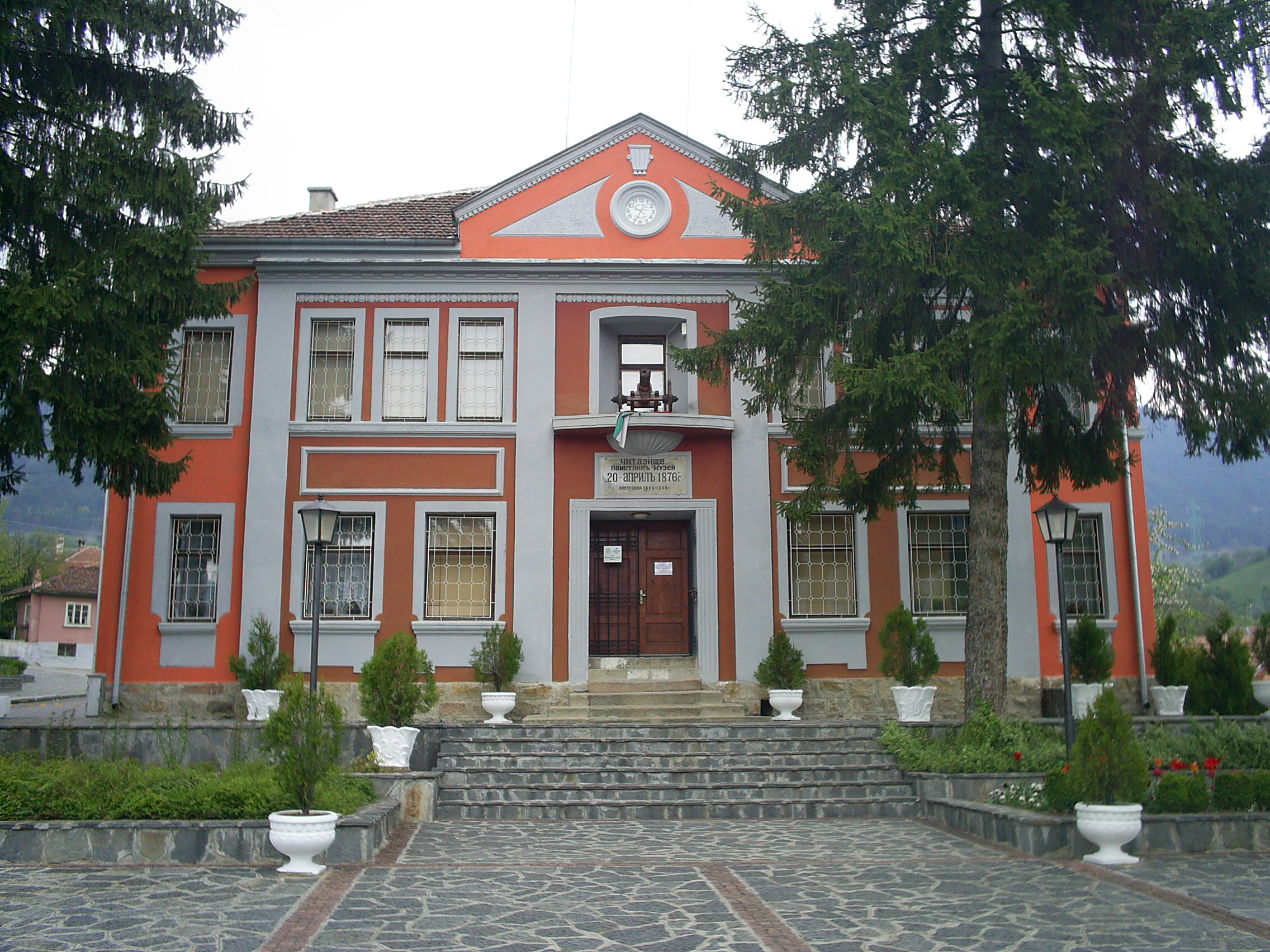
Klisura Historical Museum and chitalishte

The name of Klisura has traditionally been associated with the heroism of its inhabitants during the April Uprising of 1876. The then-village was a centre of the revolution and Borimechkata ("the man who struggles a bear") who lived in the village was one of its leaders. Places of main interest are the Church of St Nicholas, the local Historical Museum, and historic homes such as Chervenakov's house, Pavurdzhiev's house, Kozinarov's house, etc. Klisura is the birthplace of Hristo G. Danov, the founder of the first Bulgarian printing house in Plovdiv.

One and a half kilometres away from Klisura is Zli dol ("Evil glen"), the motor tourism complex of the Union of the Bulgarian Drivers. The complex includes 15 small houses with around 60 beds, a restaurant, a bar, a playground, tennis, volleyball and basketball courts, an equestrian area, and a guarded car park.

Klisura is a starting point for many itineraries to the Central Balkan National Park and to two peaks — Vezhen in the Balkan Mountains and Golyam Bogdan in Sredna Gora. The town is only one kilometre away from the first class I-6 road Gyueshevo–Sofia–Karlovo–Burgas, which is the principal Sub-Balkan highway. There are two railway stations.

Klisura Peak on Livingston Island in the South Shetland Islands, Antarctica is named after Klisura.
