= II-35 road (Bulgaria) =

Road in Bulgaria

Republic Road I-35
- Републикански път I-35

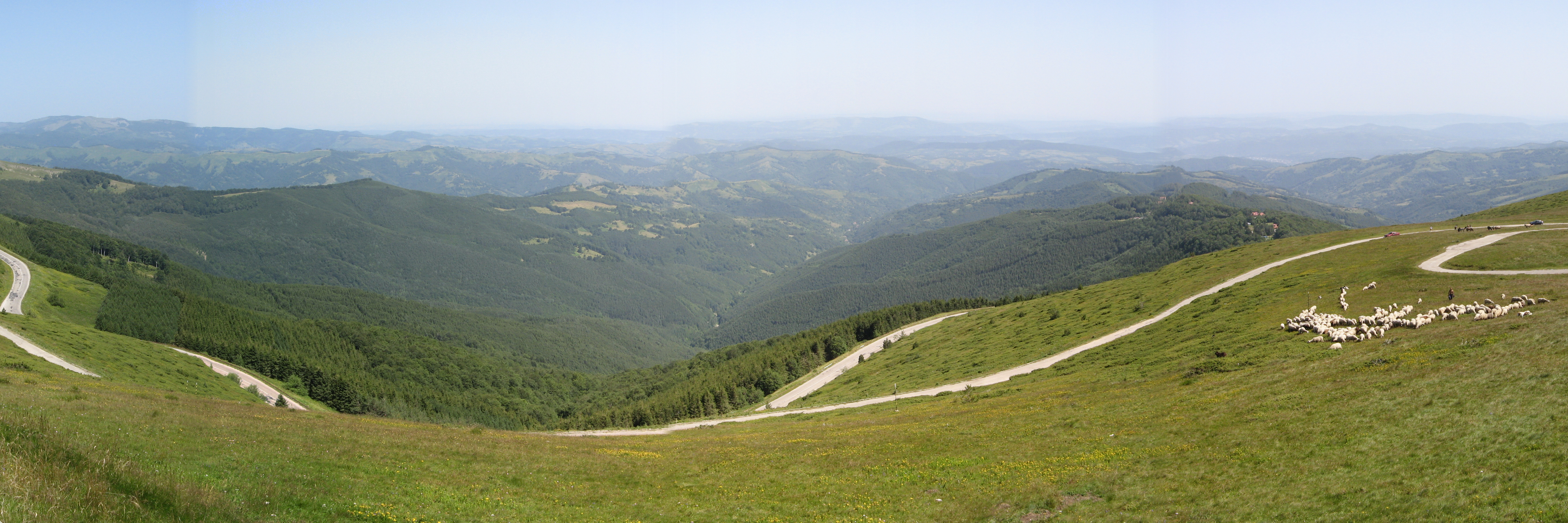
- Serpentines of the II-35 road in the Troyan Pass

Route information
- Length: 126.3 km (78.5 mi)

Major junctions
- From: Km 80.1 of I-3
- To: Km 252.0 of I-6, Karnare

Location
- Country: Bulgaria
- Towns: Pleven, Lovech, Troyan

Highway system
- Highways in Bulgaria

Republican Road II-35 (Bulgarian: Републикански път II-35) is a 2nd class road in Bulgaria, running in general direction north–south through the territory of Pleven, Lovech and Sofia Provinces. Its length is 126.3 km.

== Route description ==
The road starts at Km 80.1 of the first class I-3 road north of the village of Grivitsa in the Danubian Plain and heads southwest to the city of Pleven, passing through its center. It then turns south, crosses the Pleven Heights and the village of Brestovets and enters Lovech Province. The road passes through the eastern part of the Lovech Heights and reaches the city of Lovech and the valley of the river Osam. It continues southwards of the city ascending the Osam valley along the left bank of the river. It intersects with the first class I-4 road at the latter's Km 50, passes through the Mikrene Heights and reaches the town of Troyan.

From Troyan the road continues along the left bank of the river Beli Osam, runs through the village of Balkanets and begins to ascend the northern slopes of the Troyan Mountain, a division of the central Balkan Mountains. It cuts through the mountain range via the serpentine Troyan Pass (1,565 m), also known as Beklemeto, and enters Plovdiv Province and Karlovo Valley. There, the road reaches its terminus in the village of Karnare, where it intersects with the first class I-6 road at the latter's Km 252.
