= Sopot Municipality, Bulgaria =

Coordinates: 42°39′N 24°45′E

Sopot Municipality Община Сопот
- Municipality
- Interactive map of Sopot Municipality
- Country: Bulgaria
- Province: Plovdiv Province
- Seat: Sopot, Plovdiv Province

Sopot Municipality is a municipality in Plovdiv Province, Bulgaria. The municipality consists only of two places: the town of Sopot and the village of Anevo.

== Religion ==
According to the latest Bulgarian census of 2011, the religious composition, among those who answered the optional question on religious identification, was the following:

Religious composition of Sopot Municipality
Orthodox Christianity	91.0%
Catholicism	0.9%
Protestantism	0.4%
Islam	1.3%
No religion	1.8%
Prefer not to answer, others and indefinable	4.6%
