= Vezhen Peak =

Peak in Bulgaria

Vezhen (Вежен)
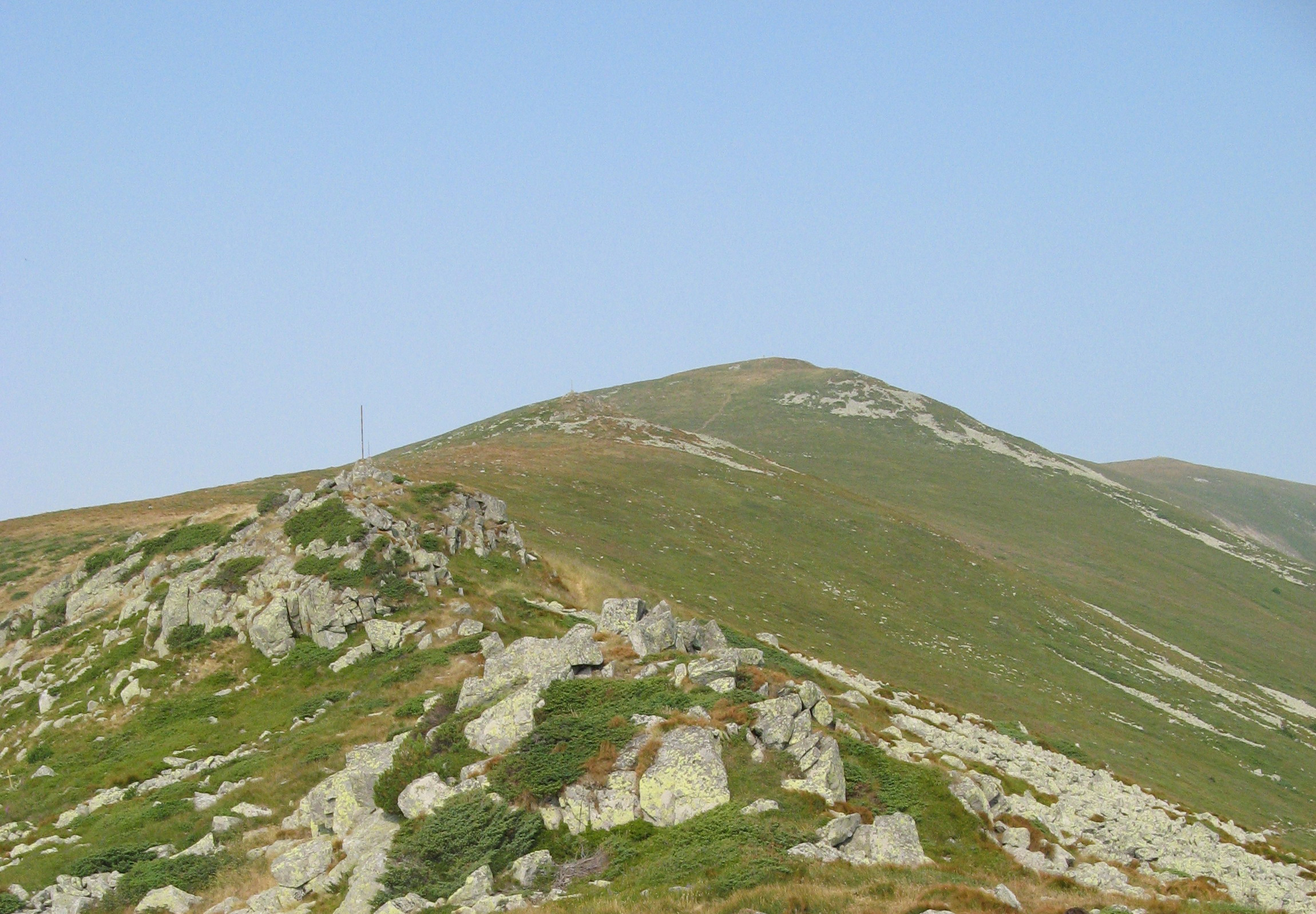
- Vezhen Peak

Highest point
- Elevation: 2,198 m (7,211 ft)
- Coordinates: 42°45′21″N 24°21′15″E

Geography
- Location within Bulgaria
- Location: Teteven Mountain, Bulgaria
- Parent range: Balkan Mountains

Vezhen (Bulgarian: Вежен [ˈvɛʒɛn]) is a peak in the Central Balkan Mountains, located in central Bulgaria. At 2,198 metres (7,211 ft) Vezhen is the 77th highest mountain in Bulgaria. It is situated in the Teteven mountain, firming part of Central Balkan National Park. Its slopes mark the border of the Tsarichina Reserve. Around the peak's area is located the largest forests of Pinus peuce in the Balkan Mountains.

== Gallery ==
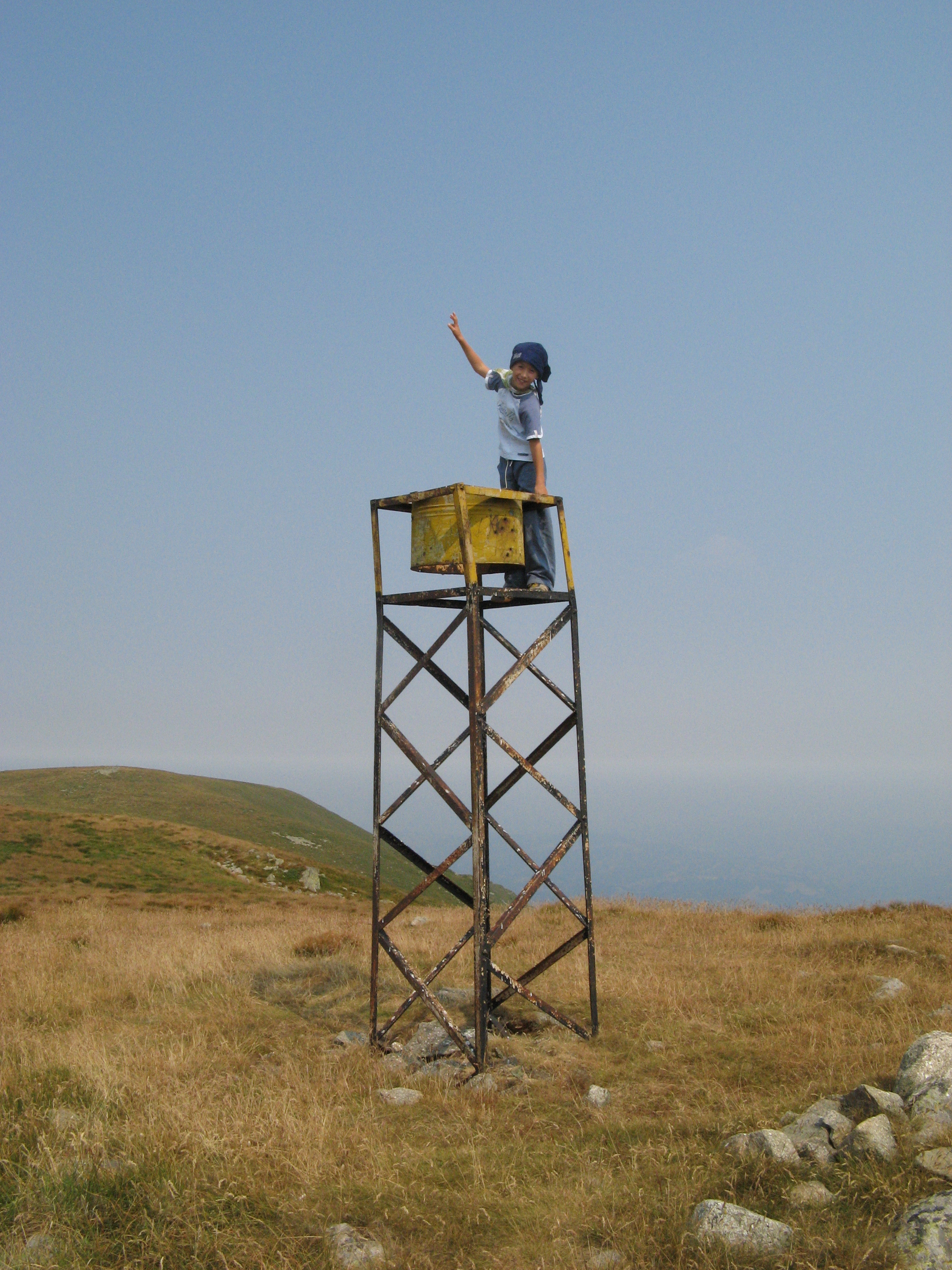
Tourist at 2,200 m.

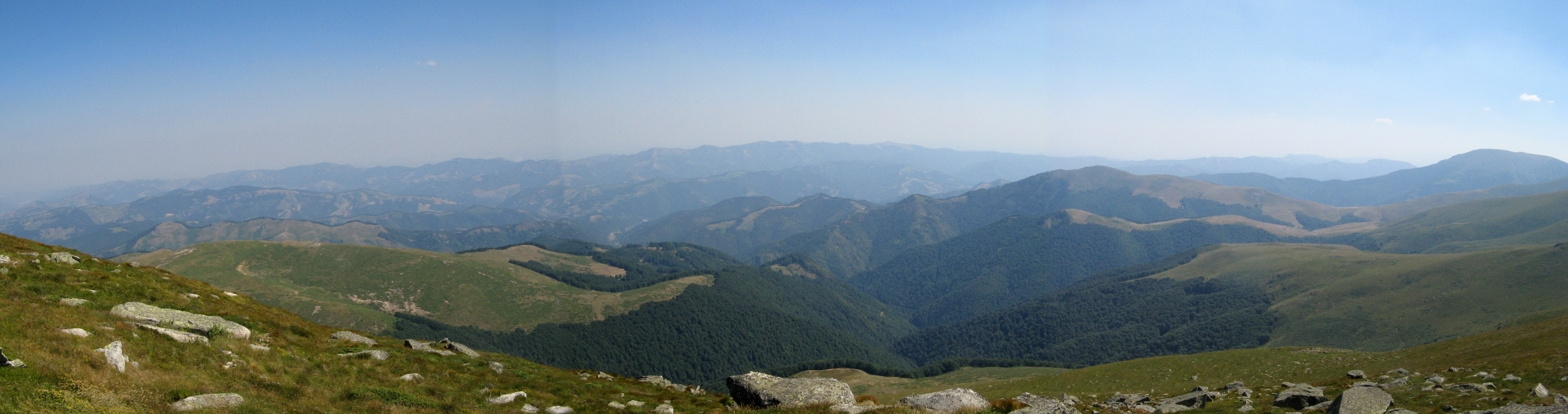
Panorama - Vezhen Peak is in far right.
