= Saedinenie Municipality =

Coordinates: 42°16′N 24°33′E

Seadinenie Municipality Община Съединение
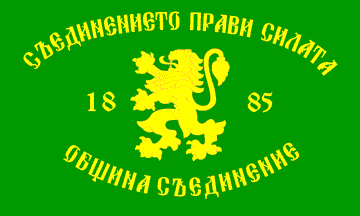
- Flag

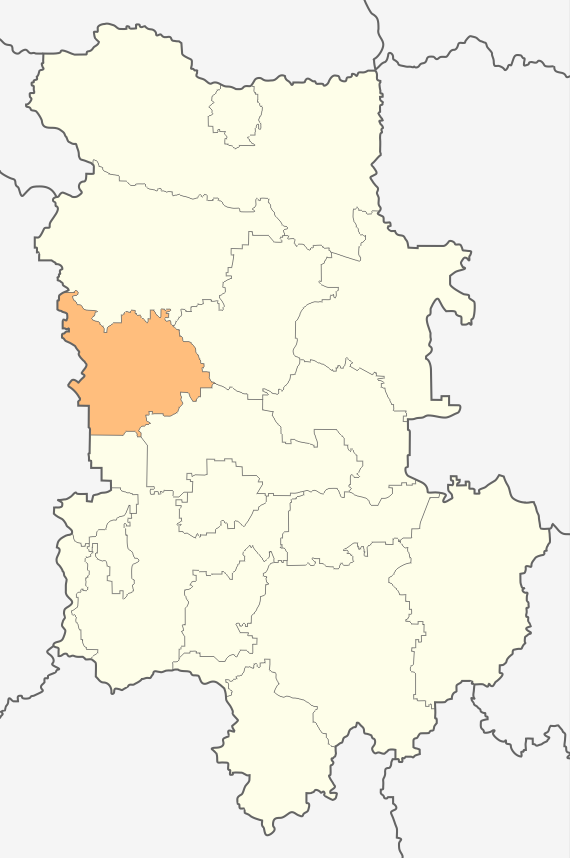
- Country: Bulgaria
- Province: Plovdiv Province
- Seat: Saedinenie

Area
  - Total: 298 km^{2} (115 sq mi)

Population (2024)
  - Total: 8,858
  - Density: 29.7/km^{2} (77.0/sq mi)
- Website: saedinenie.bg

Saedinenie Municipality (Bulgarian: Община Съединение) is a municipality in Plovdiv Province, central Bulgaria. Covering a territory of 298 km^{2}, it is the ninth largest of the 18 municipalities in the province, encompassing 4.97% of its total area. It borders the municipalities of Hisarya to the north, Kaloyanovo to the east, Maritsa to the southeast, Rodopi to the south, Pazardzhik to the west, and Strelcha to the northwest, the latter two belonging to Pazardzhik Province.

== Geography ==
The municipality has a largely flat topography. Over 95% of its area is situated in the northwesternmost part of the Pazardzhik–Plovdiv Field, which constitutes the western half of the Upper Thracian Plain. Its altitude of varies between 200 m and 350 m, with the lowest point being 187 m. The southern hilly outreaches of the Sredna Gora mountain range cover the northwestern corner of the municipal territory; there lies its highest point at the peak of Genova Mogila (534 m).

Saedinenie Municipality falls within the transitional continental climatic zone. It is drained by the middles course of two left tributaries of river Maritsa of the Aegean Sea — the Potoka and the Pyasachnik, the latter enters its territory just downstream of the Pyasachnik Reservoir. There are numerous irrigation canals.

== Transport ==
Saedinenie Municipality is traversed by four roads of the national network with a total length of 52.1 km, a 18.4 km section of the third class III-606 road, the last 7.4 km of the third class III-805 road, the first 6.7 km of the third class III-6062 road, and the last 19.6 km of the third class III-8005 road. With the addition of the local roads, the total municipal network reaches 91.2 km.

In direction southeast–northwest the municipality is crossed by 12.4 km section of railway line No. 81 Plovdiv–Panagyurishte.

== Demography ==
The population is 8,858 as of 2024.

There are nine villages and one town in Saedinenie Municipality:

- Dragomir
- Golyam Chardak
- Lyuben
- Malak Chardak
- Nayden Gerovo
- Nedelevo
- Pravishte
- Saedinenie
- Tsarimir
- Tsereterevo

== Gallery ==
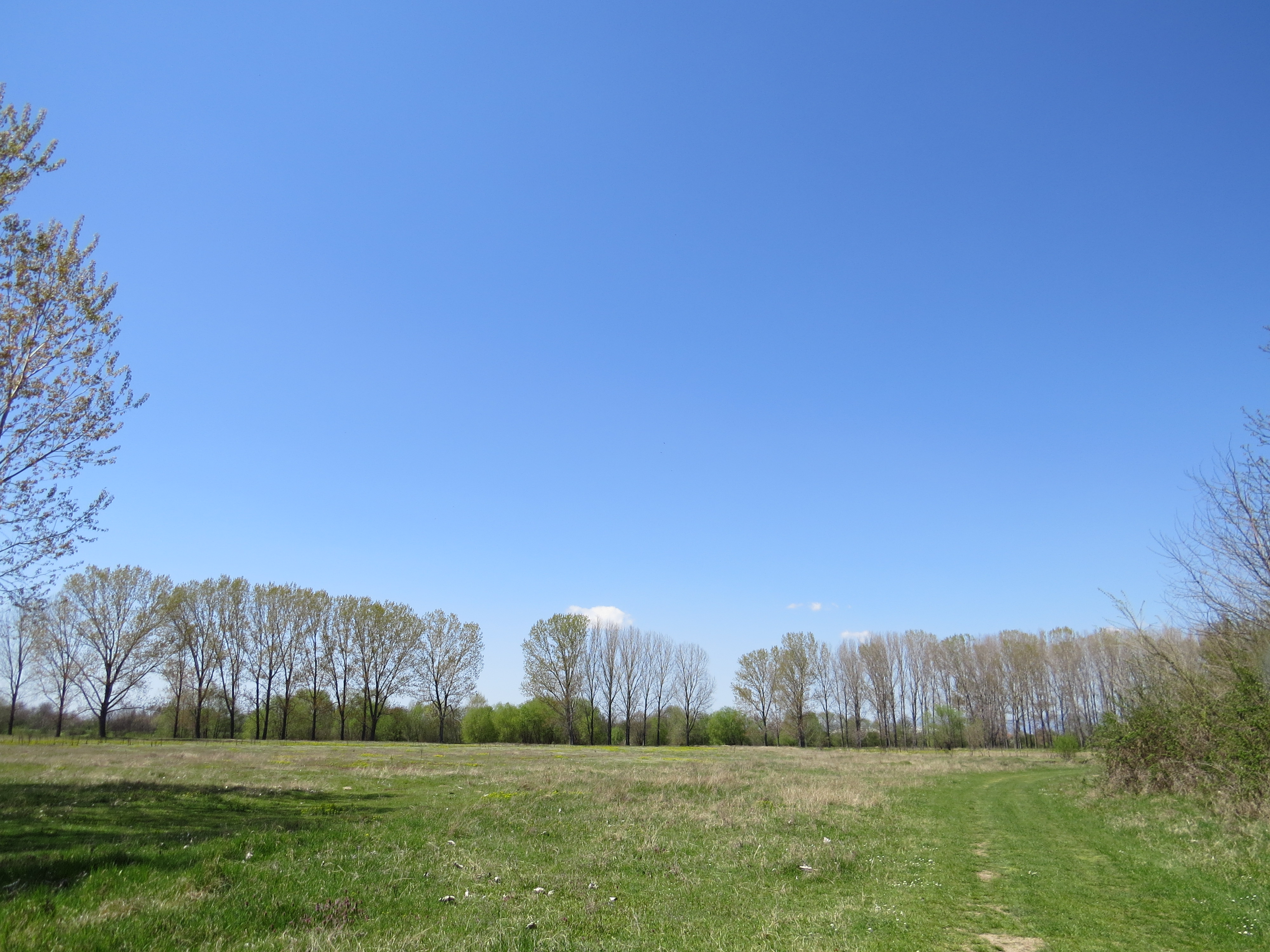
A landscape of the municipality

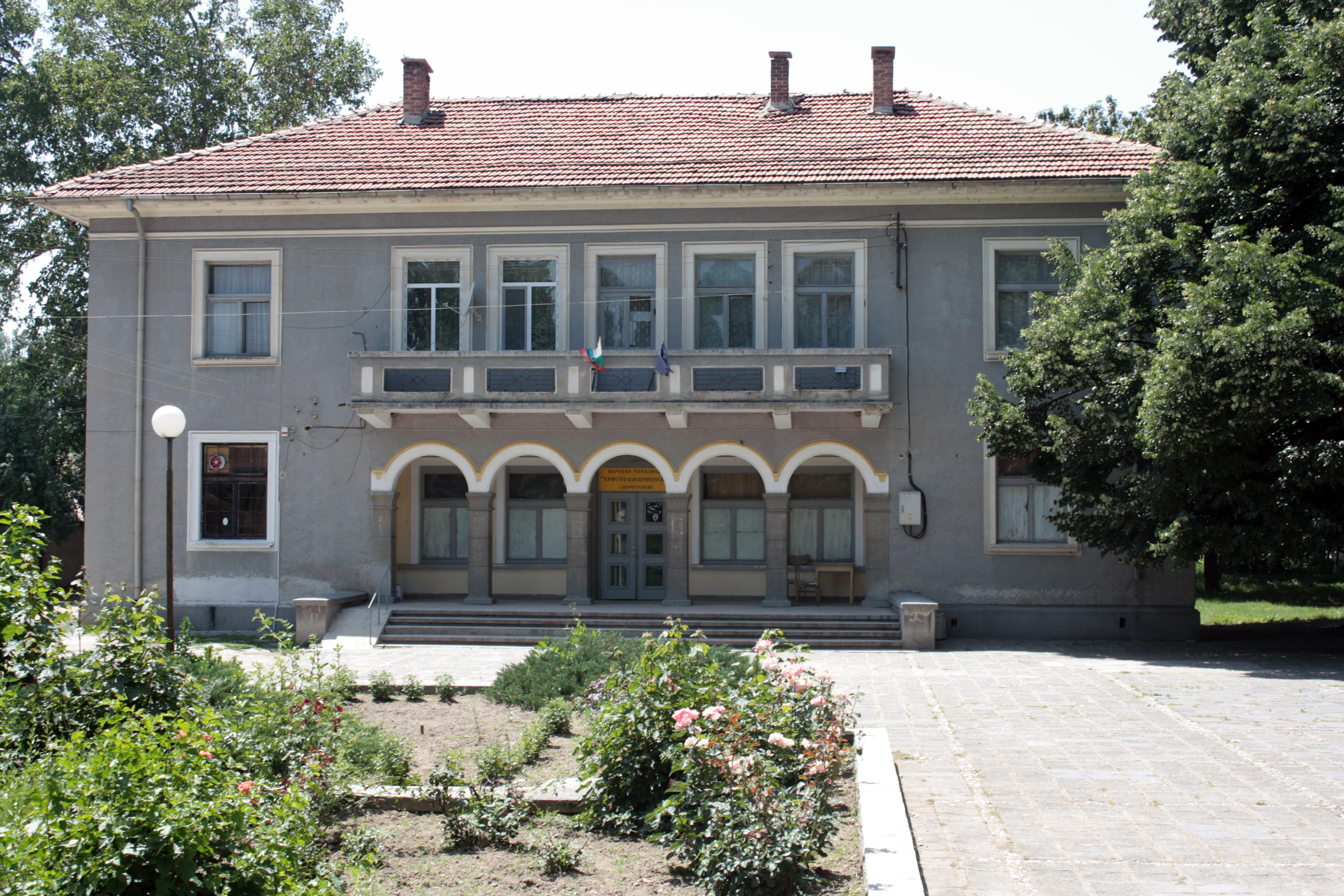
The chitalishte of Tsereterevo

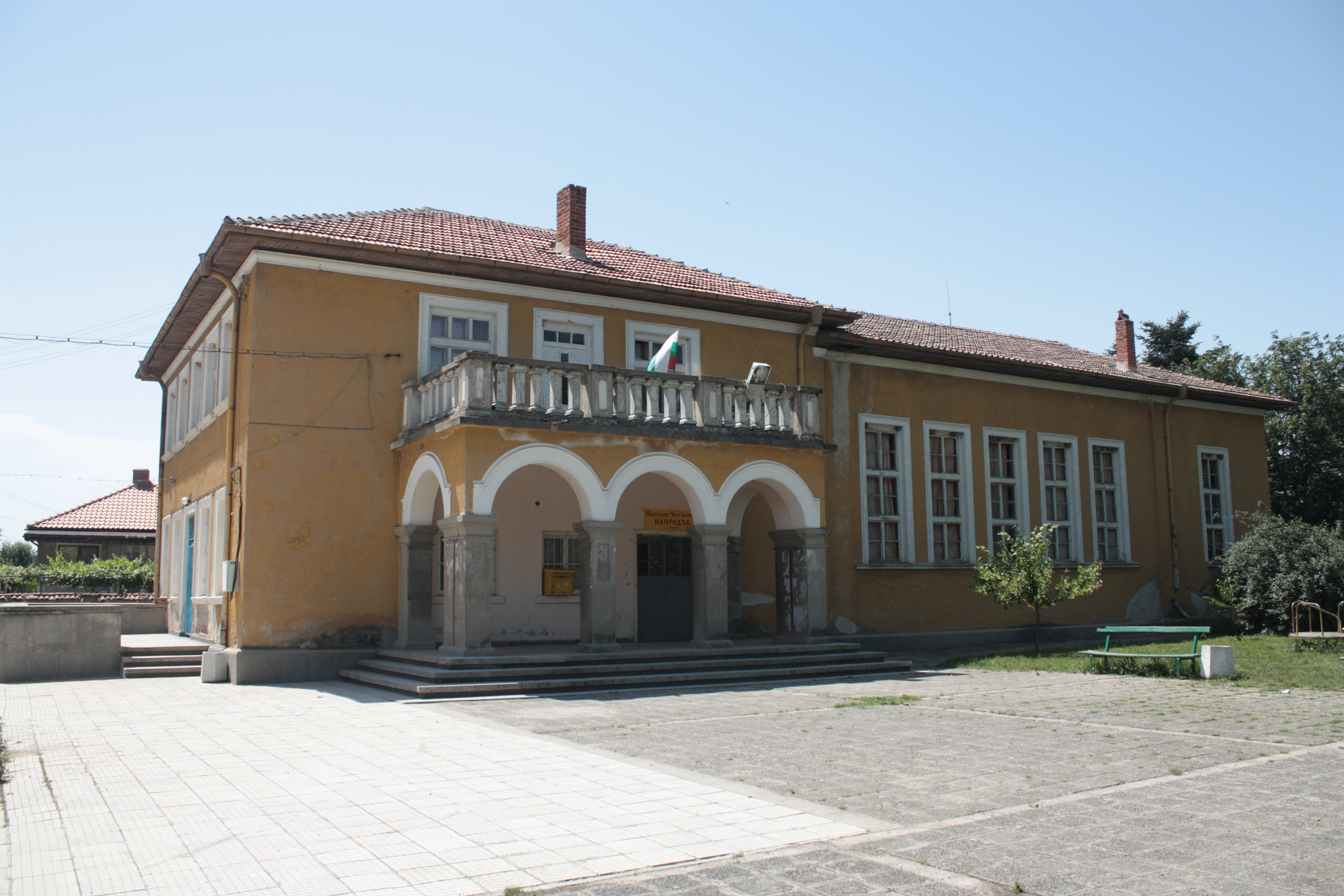
The chitalishte of Lyuben

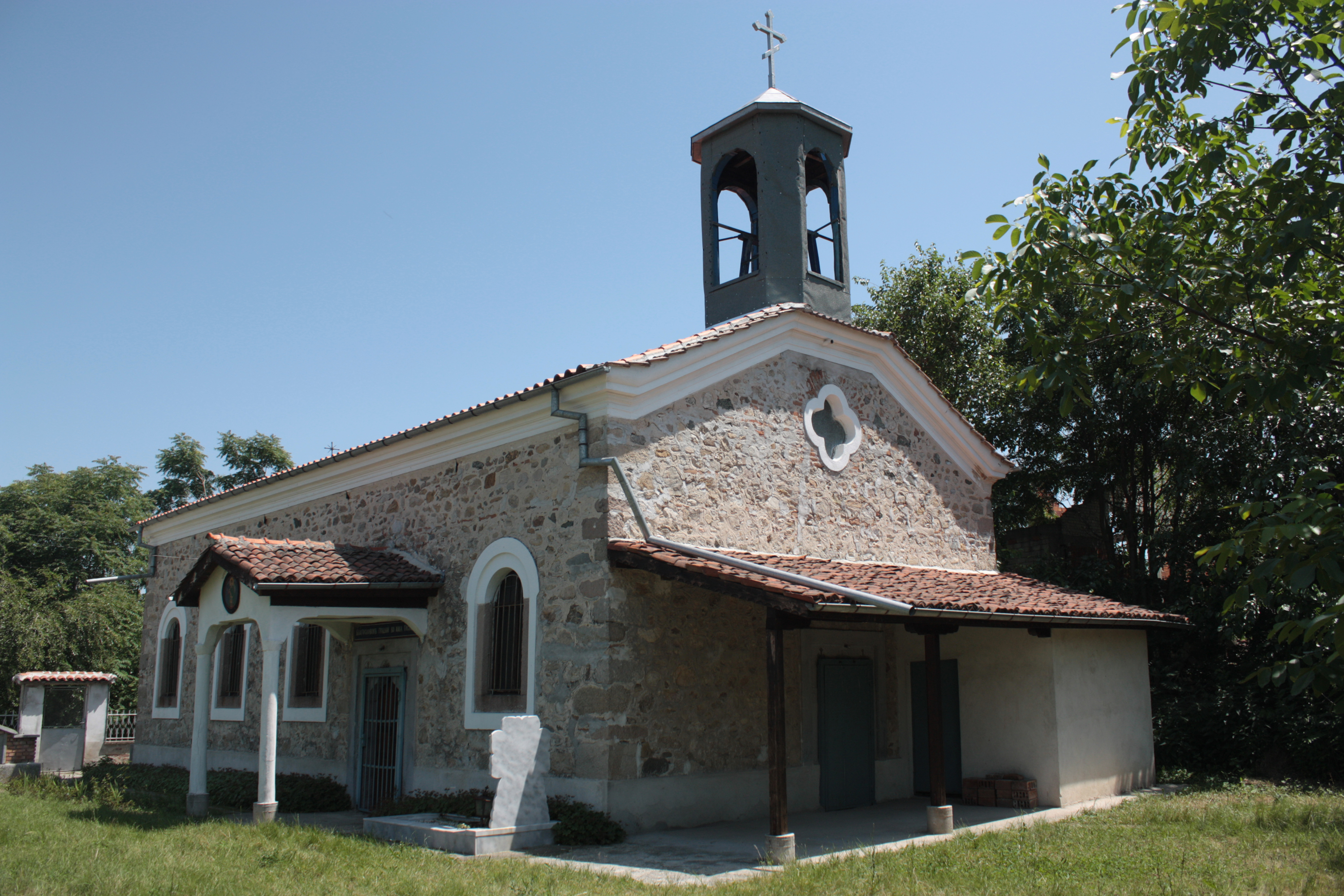
The church of Tsereterevo
