= Sredna Gora =

Mountain range in Bulgaria

- Bulgarian: Средна гора
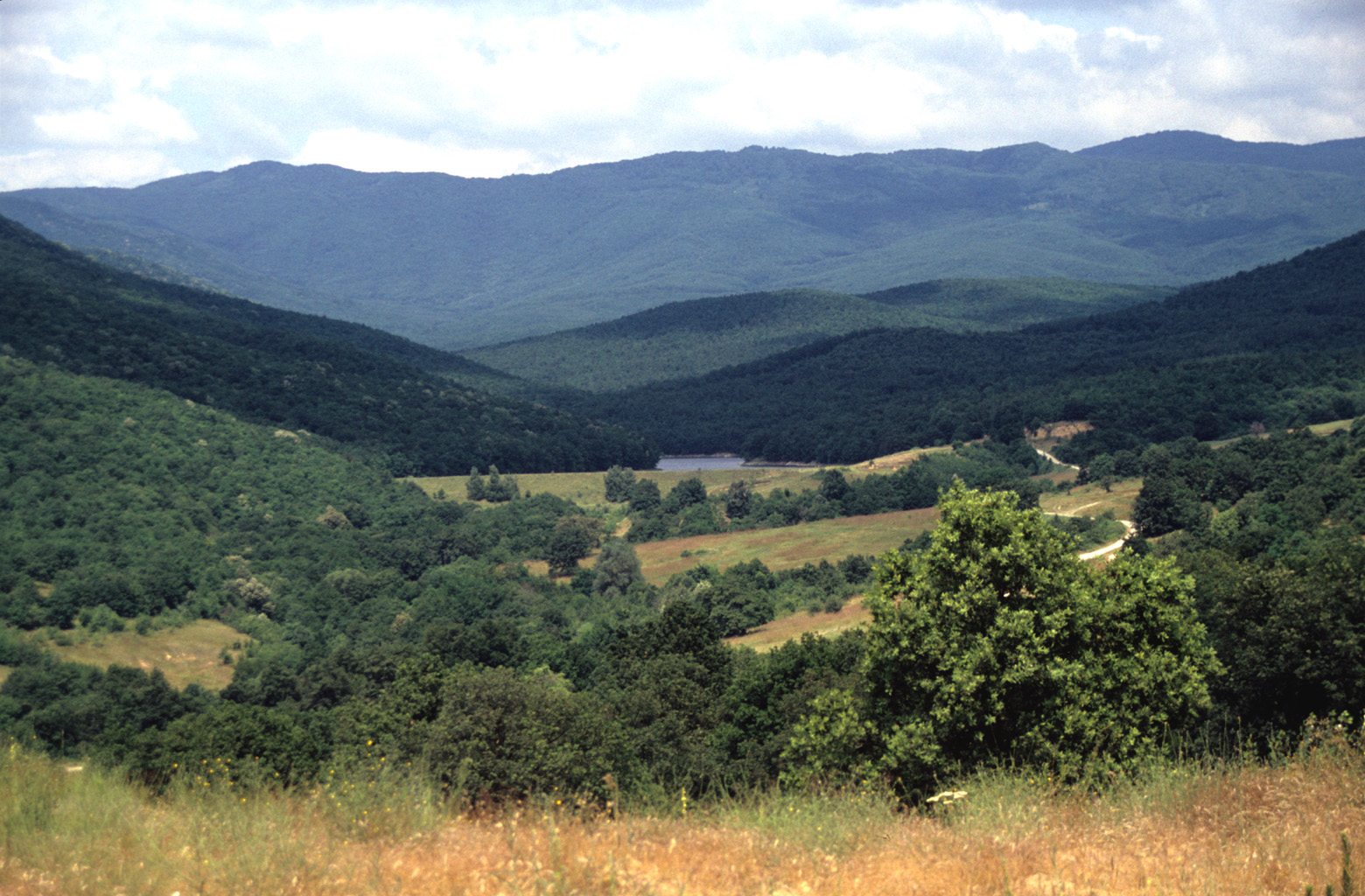

Highest point
- Peak: Golyam Bogdan
- Elevation: 1,604 m (5,262 ft)
- Coordinates: 42°30′00″N 25°00′00″E

Dimensions
- Length: 285 km (177 mi) west-east
- Width: 50 km (31 mi) north-south
- Area: 5,950 km^{2} (2,300 mi^{2})

Geography
- Location within Bulgaria
- Country: Bulgaria

Geology
- Rock type(s): granite, gneiss, quartz

Sredna Gora (Bulgarian: Средна гора [ˈsrɛdnɐ ɡoˈra]) is a mountain range in central Bulgaria, situated south of and parallel to the Balkan Mountains and extending from the river Iskar to the west and the elbow of river Tundzha north of the city of Yambol to the east. Sredna Gora is 285 km long, reaching 50 km at its greatest width. Its highest peak is Golyam Bogdan at 1,604 m (5,262 ft). It is part of the Srednogorie mountain chain system, which extends longitudinally across the most country from west to east, between the Balkan Mountains and the Sub-Balkan valleys to the north and the Kraishte, Rila and the Upper Thracian Plain to the south.

The mountain is divided into three parts by the rivers Topolnitsa and Stryama — Ihtimanska Sredna Gora to the west, Sashtinska Sredna Gora in the center, and Sarnena Sredna Gora to the east. Compared to most other mountain ranges in Bulgaria, Sredna Gora has lower average altitude, which determines higher temperatures and lower precipitation. There is an abundance of mineral springs all over Sredna Gora with many spa resorts, such as Hisarya, Starozagorski bani, Pavel Banya, etc. Sredna Gora is rich in mineral resources and especially copper. The economy is well developed. The region is an important national hub of copper extraction and processing industry, as well as of optical industry, both centered in and around the town of Panagyurishte. The largest city in Sredna Gora is Stara Zagora, one of the biggest economic centers of Bulgaria.

Sredna Gora has been continuously inhabited for thousands of years. In the 5th millennium BC it was largest mining center in Europe, extracting significant amounts of copper. The mountain range was among the centers of the ancient Thracian civilization, with numerous burial and cult remains being preserved from that period. The renown Thracian Panagyurishte Treasure has been discovered in Sredna Gora. In the Middle Ages the mountain range was part of the Bulgarian Empire since the early 8th century until it was conquered by the Ottoman Turks during the Bulgarian–Ottoman wars in the late 14th century. During the Ottoman rule Sredna Gora was an important center of resistance and the Bulgarian National Revival. It was the focal point of the April Uprising of 1876. Although many settlements in the region were destroyed in the aftermath of the rebellion, it had a decisive role for the subsequent Liberation of Bulgaria in 1878.

== Geography ==
=== Location and limits ===
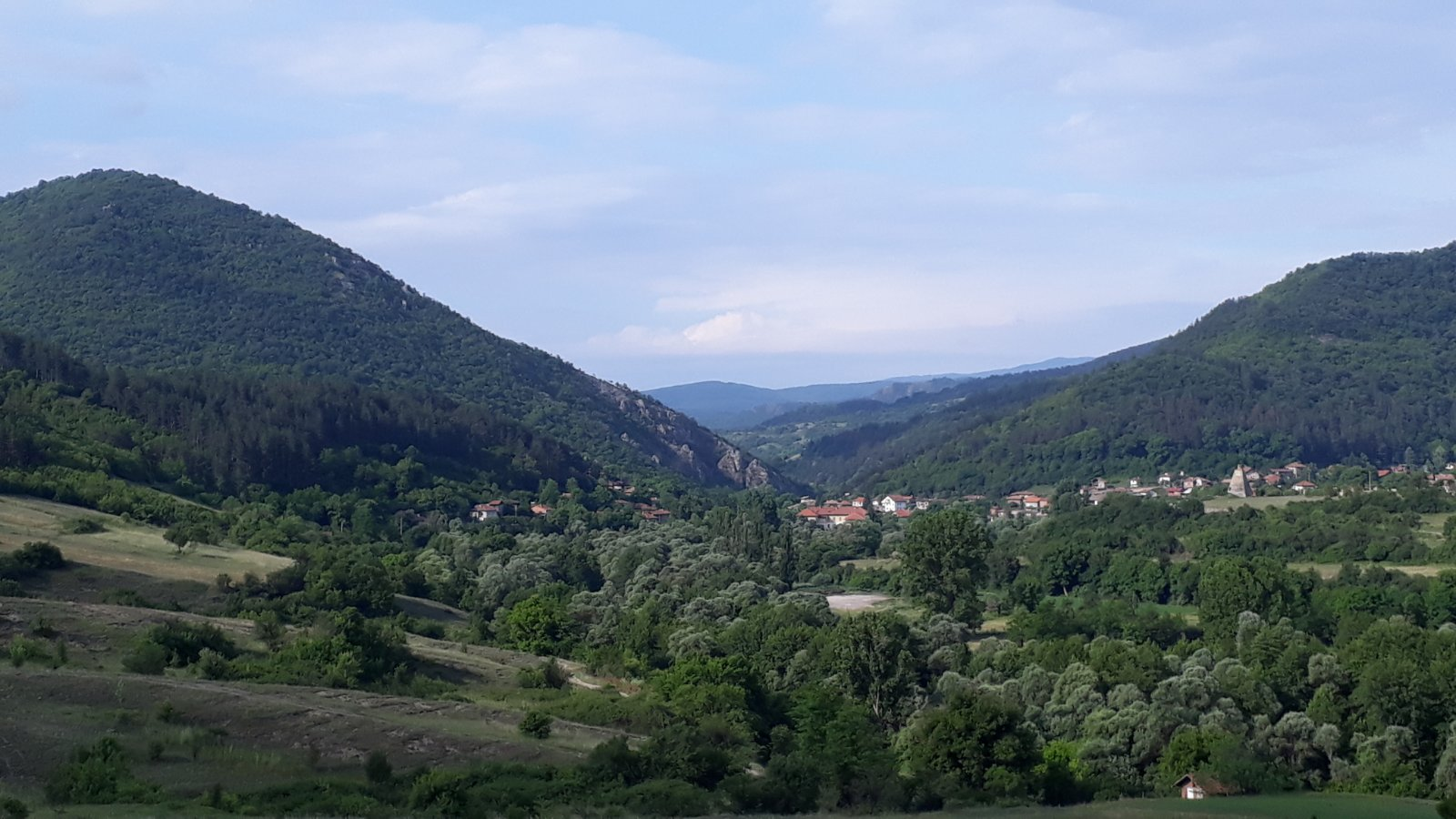
Sredna Gora near Petrich

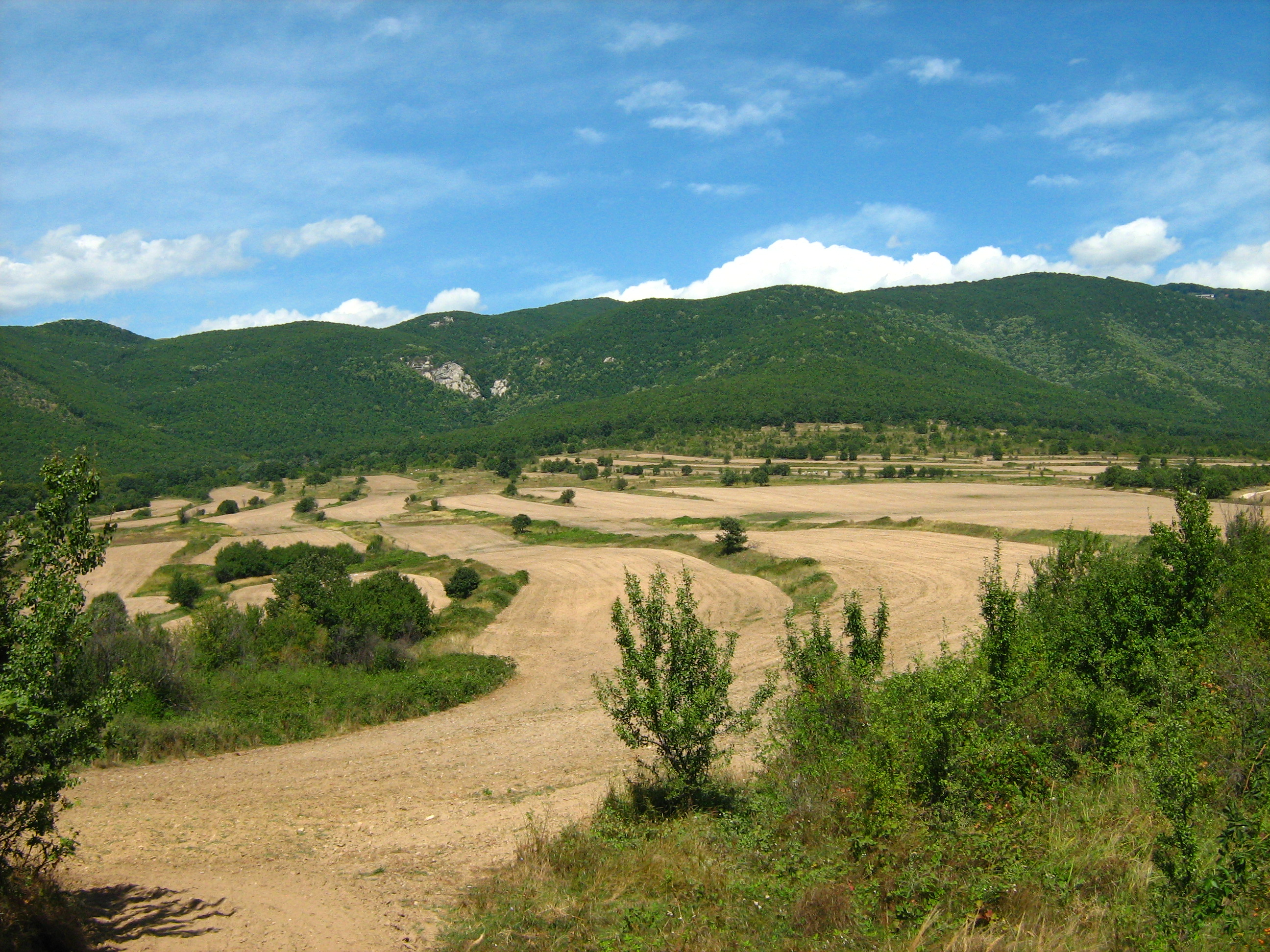
A view of Sredna Gora near Hisarya

Sredna Gora is situated in central Bulgaria, south of and parallel to the Balkan Mountains and north of the Upper Thracian Plain. It extends from the river Iskar in the west to the elbow of the river Tundzha north of the city of Yambol in the east. The main orographic ridge extends from west to east, where the mountain range reaches a total length of 285 km; its maximum width from north to south is 50 km. The total area of Sredna Gora is 5,950 km^{2}. Its highest point is the summit of Golyam Bogdan at 1,604 m; the average elevation is 608 m.

It is part of the Srednogorie mountain system that from west to east includes the mountain ranges of Greben (1,156 m in Bulgarian territory), Zavalska Planina (1,181 m), Viskyar (1,136 m), Lyulin (1,256 m), Vitosha (2,290 m), Plana (1,338 m) and Sredna Gora, as well as the heights of Bakadzhitsite and Hisar further east.

To the north, Sredna Gora extends to eight of the eleven Sub-Balkan valleys — from the southeastern limits of the Sofia Valley in the west, eastwards through the valleys of Saranska, Kamarska, Zlatitsa–Pirdop, Karlovo, Kazanlak, Tvarditsa and Sliven. The valleys of Karlovo and Kazanlak are also collectively known as the Rose Valley. Its easternmost point is the elevation of Zaychi Vrah (256 m) along the southwestern limits of the Sliven Valley just southwest of the bend of the river Tundzha. Along its northern borders, Sredna Gora is linked to the Balkan Mountains through five north-south ridges — Negushevski Rid, Oporski Rid, Galabets, Koznitsa and Strazhata.

To the west, the river Iskar and the Pancharevo Gorge separate Sredna Gora from Plana and the ridges Shipochanski Rid and Shumnatitsa link it to the Rila mountain range. From there, its southern limits follow the northern edge of the Kostenets–Dolna Banya Valley to the Momina Klisura Gorge of the river Maritsa to the town of Belovo. From Belovo begins its border with the Upper Thracian Plain, which roughly follows a line through the settlements of Vetren, Kalugerovo, Blatnitsa, Krasnovo, Starosel, Chernichevo and reaching the river Stryama at the village of Pesnopoy. From there it continues further east close to the villages of Varben, Zelenikovo and Veren, from where the Chirpan Heights from a bulge in southern direction to the town of Chirpan and then the mountain range continues eastwards near Stara Zagora, Korten and Kamenovo, reaching the elevation of Zaychi Vrah northwest of Yambol.

=== Division ===
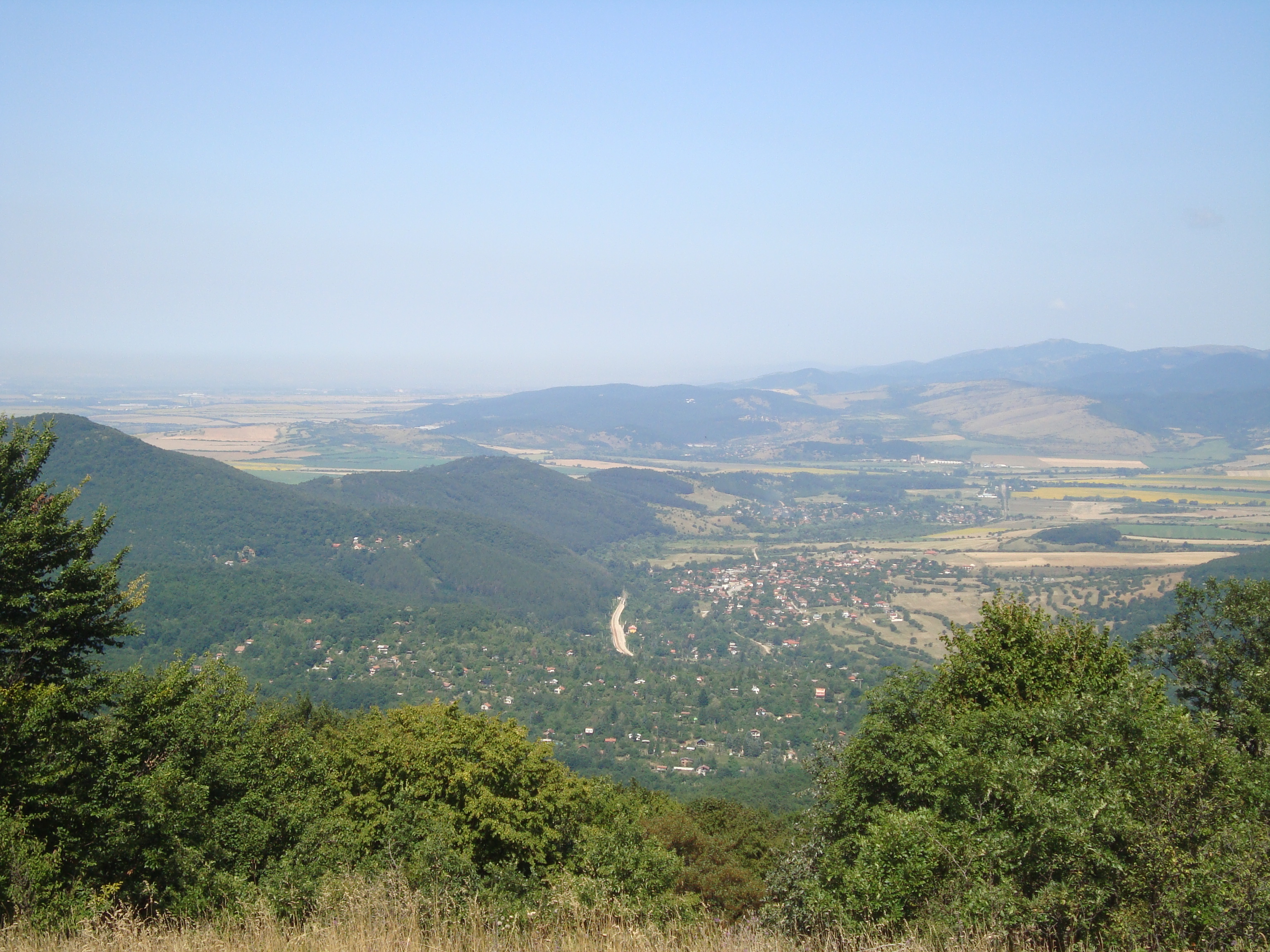
Ihtimanska Sredna Gora from the summit of Opor

Sredna Gora is divided in three parts by the rivers Topolnitsa and Stryama, both left tributaries of the Maritsa — Ihtimanska Sredna Gora to the west, Sashtinska Sredna Gora in the middle and Sarnena Sredna Gora to the east.

Ihtimanska Sredna Gora is limited to the west by the valley of the Iskar, to the north by the valleys of Sofia, Saranska, Kamarska and Zlatitsa–Pirdop, to the east by the Topolnitsa, to the south by the Rila mountain range. It covers an area of 1,370 km^{2} with an average elevation of 750 m, thus being the smallest in territory and the highest in average altitude of the three divisions. Ihtimanska Sredna Gora is subdivided in three sections — Vakarelsko–Belishki, Shipochansko–Eledzhiski and Ihitmanski. The first section includes the mountains of Lozen (1,190 m) which is the westernmost point of the whole mountain range, Vakarelska (1,090 m) and Belitsa (1,221 m). The river Gabra forms a small valley between Lozen and Vakarelska. Shipochansko–Eledzhiski section is located between the Samokov Valley in the west and the Topolnitsa in the east and links with Rila and Konstenets–Dolna Banya Valley in the south. It includes the ridges of Shipochanski Rid (1,312 m), Shumnatitsa (1,392 m), Septemvriyski (1,275 m) and Eledzhik (1,186 m). Between these two sections is situated the Ihtiman Valley at an altitude of 620 m to 700 m.

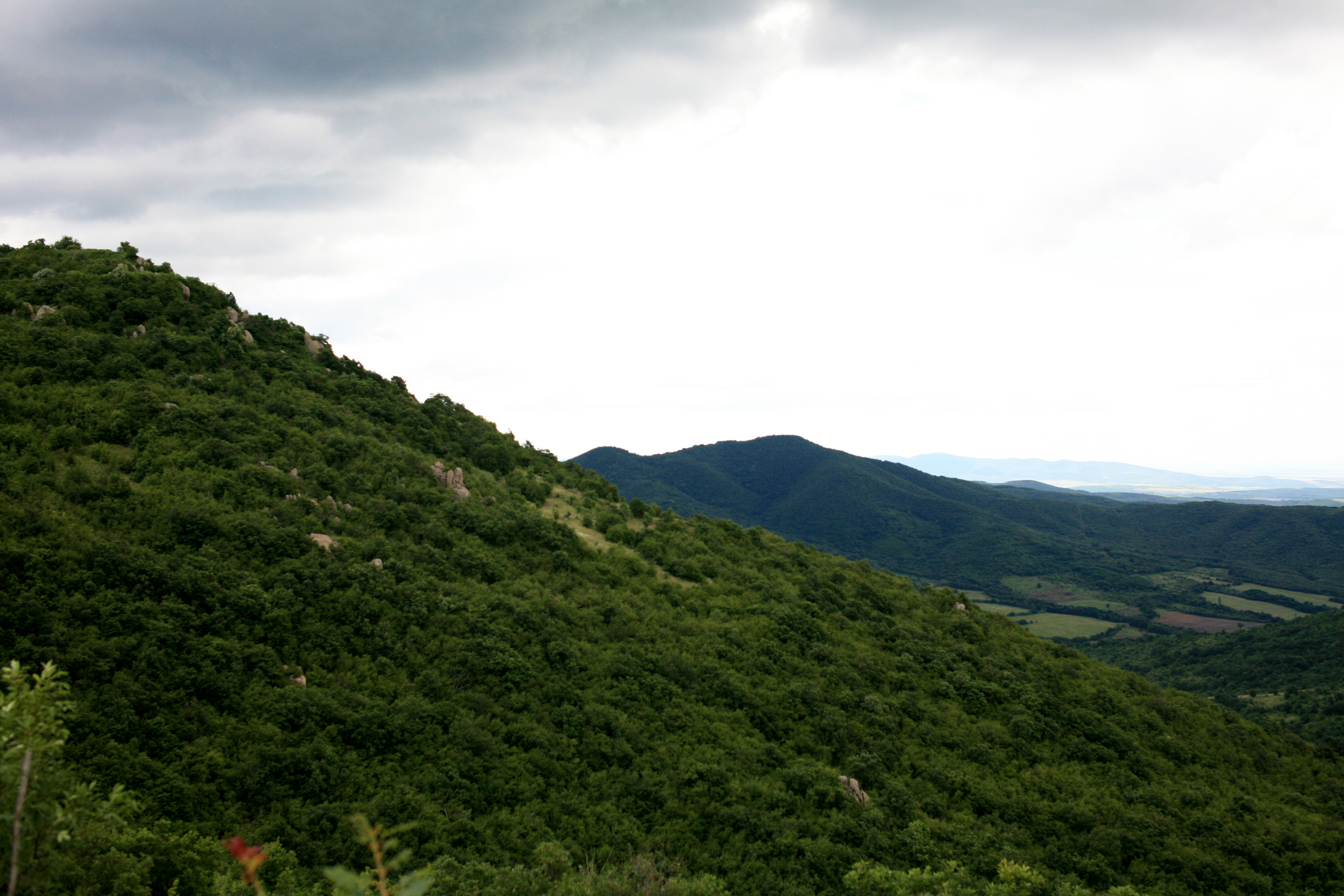
Sarnena Sredna Gora near Rozovec

Sashtinska Gredna Gora spans from the valley of the Topolnitsa in the west to the river Stryama in the east. It spans a territory of 2,300 km^{2} and has an average elevation of 656 m. Sashtinska Sredna Gora is limited to the north by the southern reaches of the Zlatitsa–Pirdop and Karlovo valleys, and to the south by the Upper Thracian Plain. It is subdivided in two sections — Bunaysko–Bogdanski and Panagyursko–Strelchanski. The former is the highest past of the mountain range and is located to the north. From west to east it includes the summits of Bratia (1,519 m), Bunaya (1,572 m) and Golyan Bogdan (1,604 m). In its middle is located the high altitude Koprivshtitsa Valley (1,000 m). The elevation lowers to the south into the valleys of the towns of Panagyurishte and Strelcha, as well as the middle courses of the rivers Luda Yana, Potoka and Pyasachnik.

Sarnena Sredna Gora is the lowest in the range, with most hilly terrain, spanning to the Stryama in the west to the Tundzha in the east. It has an area of 2,280 km^{2} and an average elevation of 416 m. It is limited to the north by the southern reaches of the valleys of Karlovo, Kazanlak, Tvarditsa and Sliven; in the south it gradually descents to the Upper Thracian Plain. There are three sections — Bratanski, Kortenski and Chirpanski. The former is the highest in elevation, spans from the Stryama in the west to the Zmeyovski Pass (430 m) in the east and is dominated by the summit of Bratan (1,236 m). Kortenski section is located eastwards of the Zmeyovski Pass and reaches the easternmost point of the mountain range at Zaychi Vrah; its highest peak in Moruley (895 m). The third section is formed by the Chirpan Heights located south of Bratanski Section, which reaches a maximum heights of 651 m at Kitka.

== Climate ==
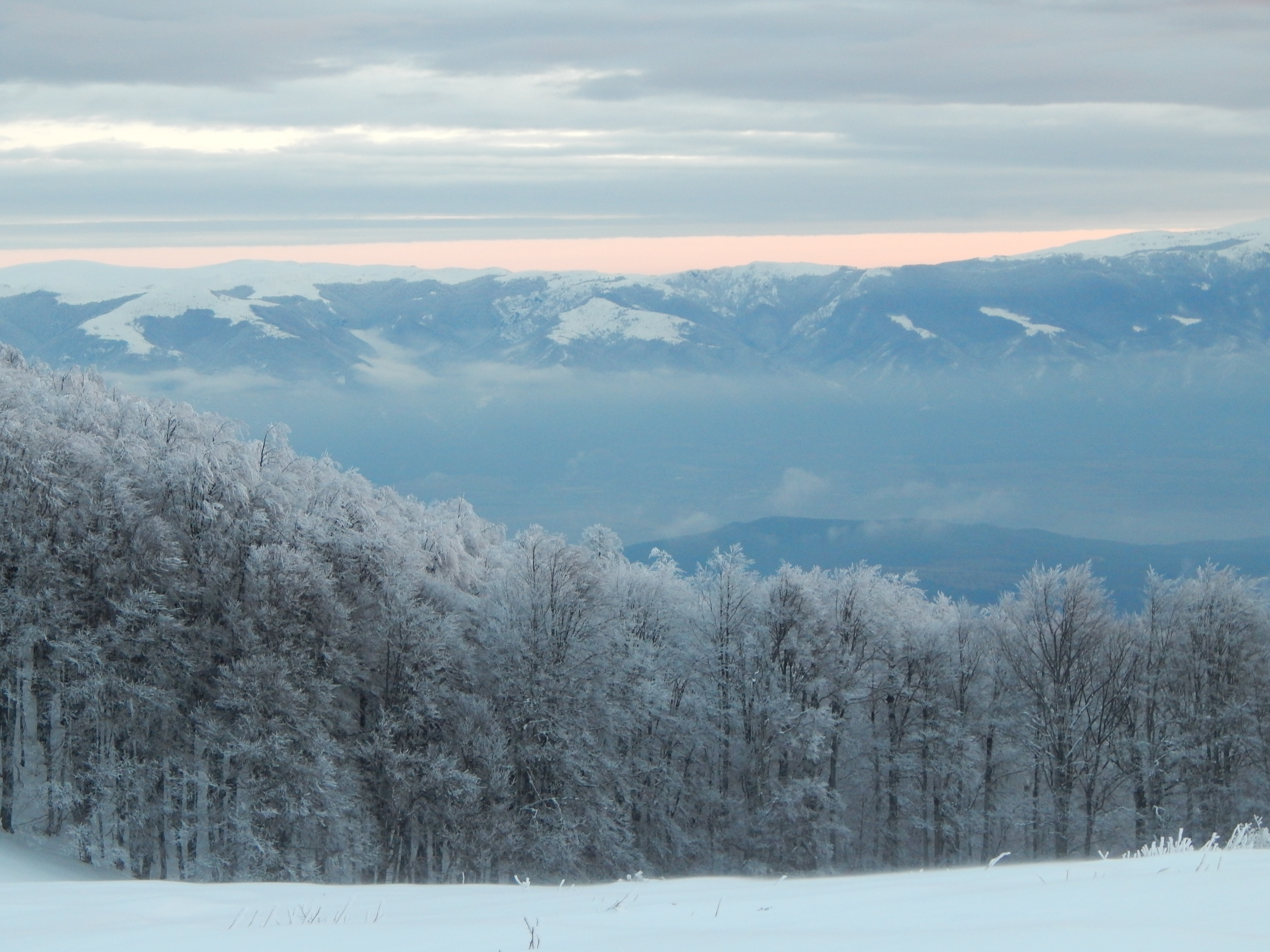
A winter view near Bogdan Reserve

Sredna Gora falls within the temperate continental climatic zone. Yet, the uneven altitude, the significant segmentation and the varied exposure of the relief of Sredna Gora, together with the climate-forming impact of the transformative air masses from the neighbouring territories, determine the marked differentiation of the climatic conditions in the mountain range. The continental climate is prevails in the mountain zone up to 1,000 m along the northern slopes and up to 1,500 m along the southern slopes. Above this elevation the climate is Alpine. In the lower parts of Sarnena Sredna Gora, and especially along its southernmost slopes is the transitional zone between the temperate continental and the continental Mediterranean climate. Due to the uneven altitude, the average January temperature in the lowest parts fluctuates in the range from 0 °C to −4 °C, lowering significantly in the range between −5 °C and −8 °C at higher altitudes. Temperature inversions regularly occur in the well-enclosed valleys in Sredna Gora during winter and have contributed for the absolute minimum temperature at the towns of Panagyurishte (−32.4 °C), Koprivshtitsa (−32.0 °C). and Ihtiman (−31.8 °C).

The significant climatic variation of the mountain range is also manifested by the uneven quantitative distribution of the average annual precipitation and its different regime. In those parts of Sredna Gora with temperate continental and Alpine climate the precipitation has a well-defined summer maximum and a winter minimum. The average annual precipitation in the territory with temperate continental climate varies between 600–800 mm, while in the Alpine zone it reaches 800–1,000 mm. There, together with the increase of altitude and precipitation also increases the amount of solid precipitation, with snow cover reaching an average of four to five months. In the mountain regions in the transitional climatic zone, where the influence of the Mediterranean is stronger, the precipitation is relatively evenly distributed throughout the year and is also the lowest, reaching 550–600 mm annually.

== Hydrology ==
A view near the Topolnitsa Reservoir

In most of Sredna Gora, the rivers originating from the mountain range have predominantly rain-snow feed and high water in early spring, due to the less pronounces snow retention and the predominantly pluvial element in the river flow, compared to the higher Bulgarian mountain ranges. In its lowest areas in the east, the rivers are almost exclusively with rain feed. Most of these rivers have temporary flow and in places with deforested or eroded watersheds, at times, they also have a pronounced brief torrential flow. In the highest parts of Sredna Gora the river flow is 15 L/s per km^{2}, due to the relatively small amount of precipitation, lower snow retention and stronger evaporation. At lower elevation, particularly in the east, this amount is reduced to 1 L/s per km^{2}, due to the small precipitation, the significant evaporation, the negligible slopes and the permeable ground. The average river flow for the whole mountain range is 4.7 L/s per km^{2}. The water resources in Sredna Gora are more limited compared to other mountain ranges in Bulgaria, due to lower average altitude, higher temperature and lower snow retention.

The rivers in most of Gredna Gora belong to the Maritsa river drainage of the Aegean Sea basin, with the exception of the westernmost and northwesternmost areas, which belong to the Iskar river drainage of the Black Sea basin. The rivers that originate from the mountain range include the right tributaries of the Iskar, the Lesnovska reka and Shipochanitsa, the left tributaries of the Maritsa, the Topolnitsa and its tributary the Mativir, the Luda Yana, the Potoka, the Pyasachnik, the Srebra, the Brezovska reka, the Omurovska reka, the Tekirska reka, the Merichlerska reka, the Martinka and the Sazliyka, as well as two right tributaries of the Tundzha, the Tukiyska reka and the Gyurlya. In the narrowest section of the Topolnitsa gorge is located the Topolnitsa Reservoir. The Topolnitsa river basin has the highest average river flow at 8.2 L/s per km^{2}.

There are numerous mineral springs all over the mountain range, situated mainly along fault lines. On its southern slopes from west to east are located the mineral springs at Dolna Banya, Pchelin, Kostenets, Banya, Panagyurishte, Strelcha, Krasnovo, Staro Zhelezare, Hisarya, Starozagorski bani and Korten. On the northern slopes in the same direction are Banya, Pavel Banya, Yagoda, Novozagorska Banya and Slivenski Mineralni Bani.

== Nature ==
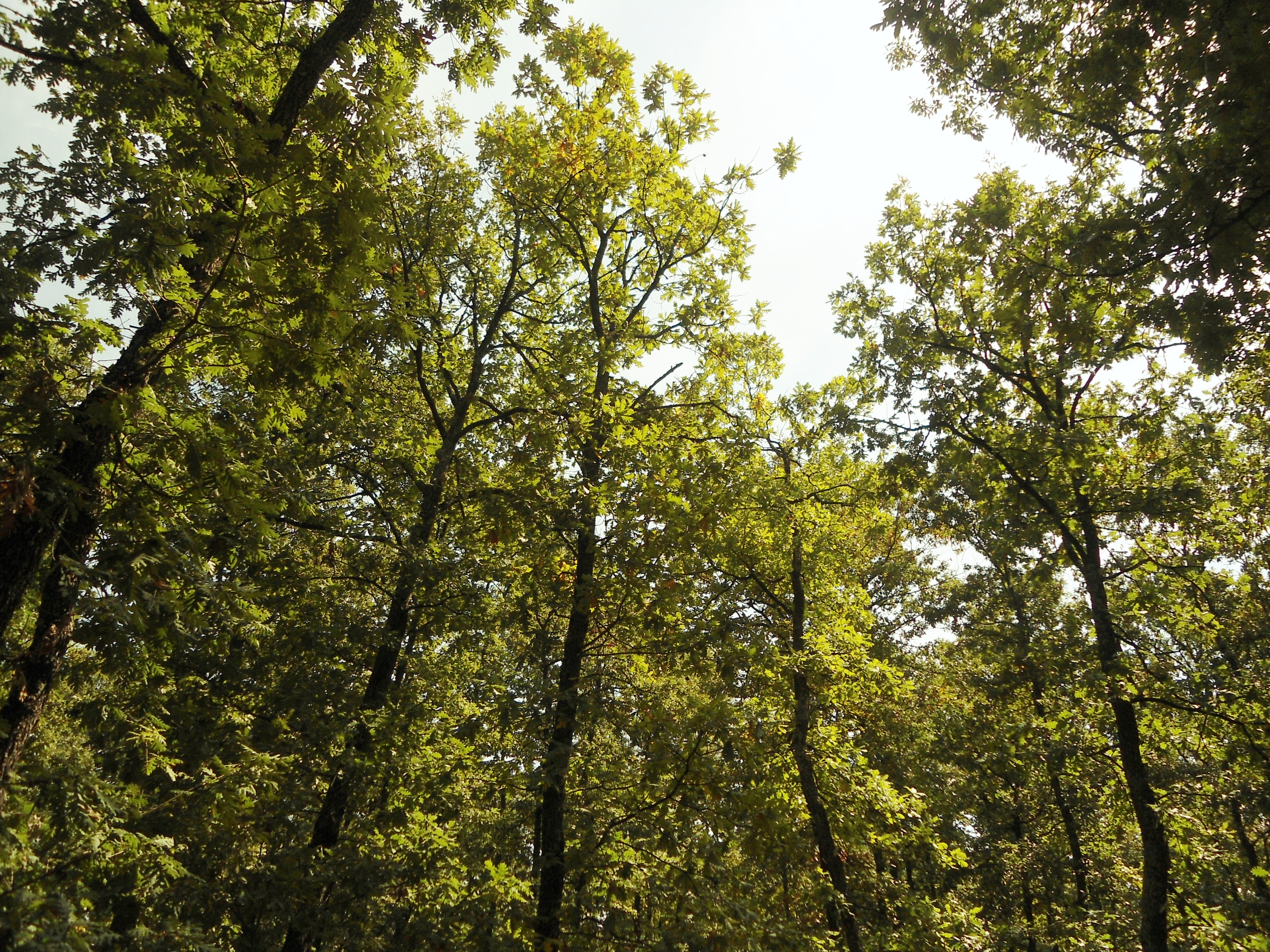
A Hungarian oak (Quercus frainetto) forest in Sredna Gora

The vegetation of Sredna Gora is influenced not only by the geographical distribution of the soil types, but also by the nature of the climatic conditions, as well as by some features of the relief and human economic activity. The alluvial soils along the river valleys are accompanied by hydrophilous grass and forest vegetation (alders, willows, poplars), and the areas of the vertisols and a significant part of the lands of the cinnamon forest soils are arable land covered with farms and pastures, where the range of natural vegetation is significantly reduced. In the places with no arable land on the cinnamon forest soils, the vegetation is represented by oaks, while hornbeams grow on the northern slopes of the hilly and low-mountain terrain. In the higher zones, the brown forest soils support beech forest vegetation; in some areas of Sashtinska Sredna Gora there are old-growth beech forests. On the flat ridges of Sashtinska Sredna Gora, on the mountain-meadow soils, grass formations is widely developed, represented by extensive meadows and pastures.

In terms of vegetation zones, at highest elevation predominate forest of European beech (Fagus sylvatica), at places mixed with common hornbeam (Carpinus betulus), silver fir (Abies alba) and European hop-hornbeam (Ostrya carpinifolia) at more stony areas. At lower elevation, mostly on the northern slopes, there are forests of common hornbeam and sessile oak (Quercus petraea). On the southern slopes of the lowest easternmost parts of Sredna Gora there are sparse xerothermic forests, dominated by the largest woods of the Mediterranean turpentine tree (Pistacia terebinthus) in Bulgaria. In the lowest slopes, especially in the east, there are xerothermic forests of Austrian oak (Quercus cerris), Hungarian oak (Quercus frainetto) and pubescent oak (Quercus pubescens).

In terms of fauna, Sredna Gora is mainly inhabited by Central European species. Of the large herbivore mammals typical representatives are roe deer, red deer and wild boar. Of the predators, the red fox is common, while the grey wolf and the brown bear are rare, the later being vagrant from the neighbouring Balkan Mountains. Common small mammals include southern white-breasted hedgehog, red squirrel, European edible dormouse, wood mouse, etc. Typical bird species are middle spotted woodpecker, rock partridge, sombre tit, great tit and many others. Reptiles and amphibians are represented by Aesculapian snake, smooth snake, common European viper, horned viper, grass snake, common wall lizard, European copper skink, yellow-bellied toad, European green toad, common toad, common frog, fire salamander. The Alpine newt is very rare, found only in the vicinity of the summit of Malak Bogdan.

Of Bulgaria's 90 nature reserves and managed nature reserves, only one is situated in the mountain range, Bogdan Reserve. None of the national or nature parks in the country extends to Sredna Gora.

== History ==
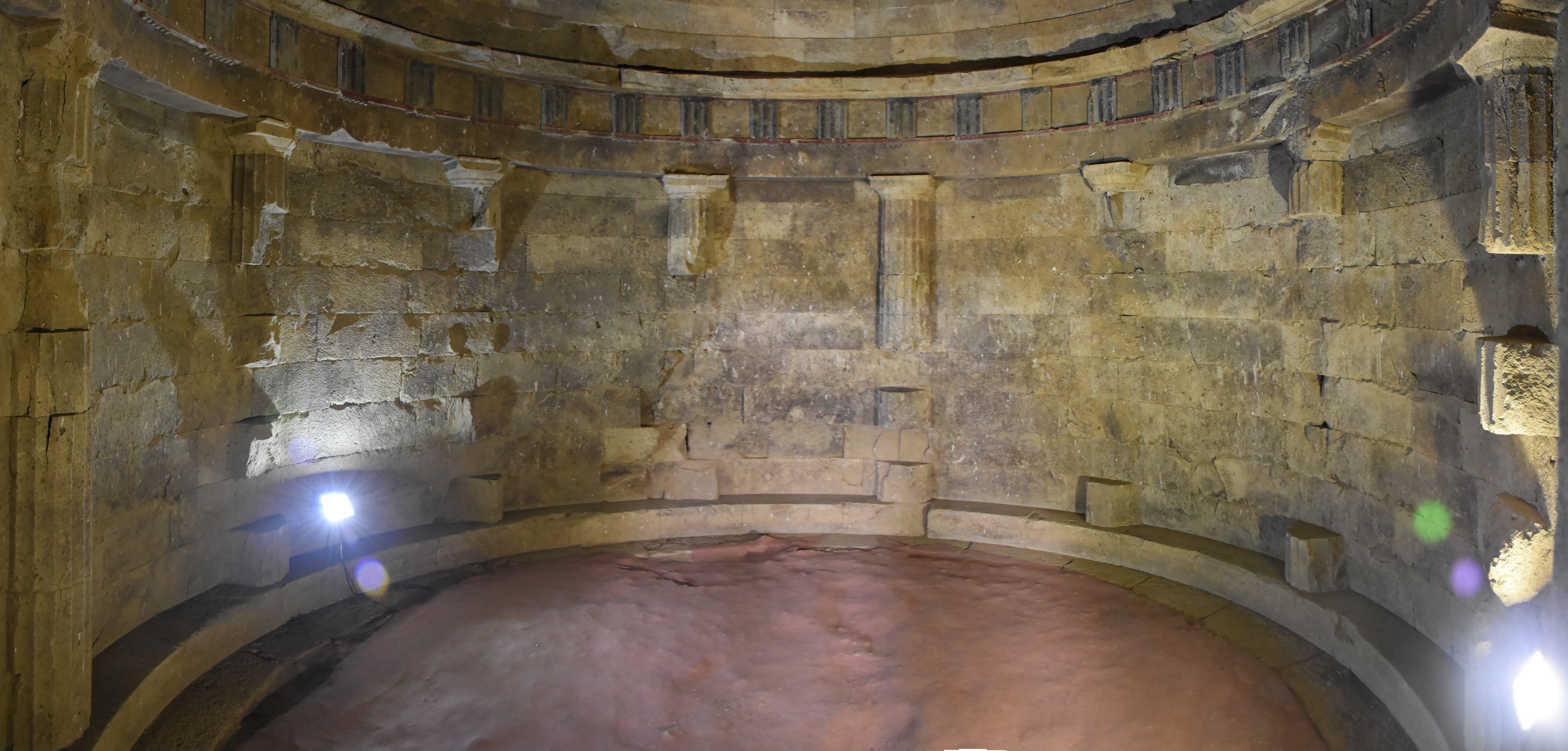
The Thracian tomb of Chetinyova Mogila near Starosel

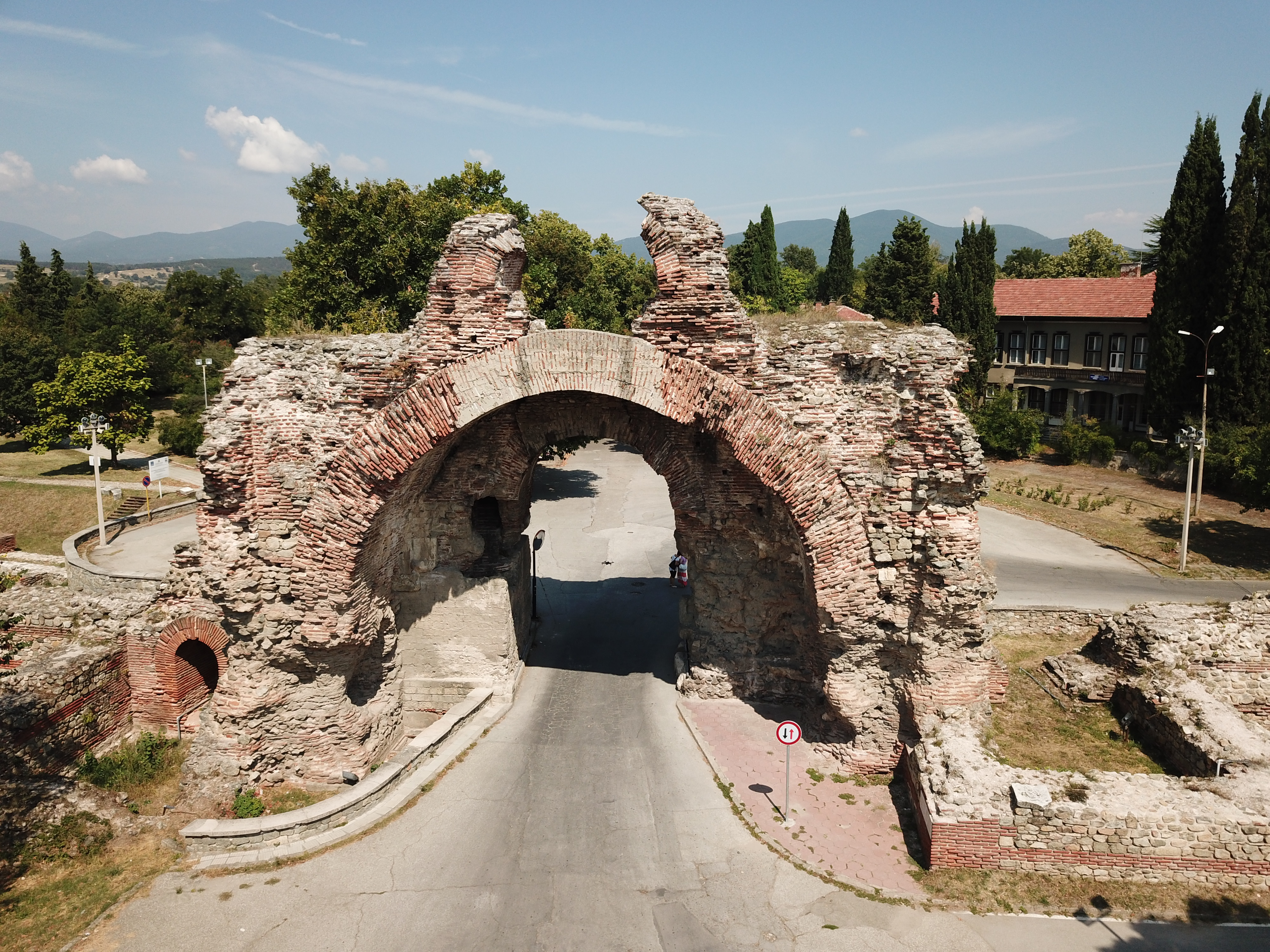
The Roman walls of Hisarya

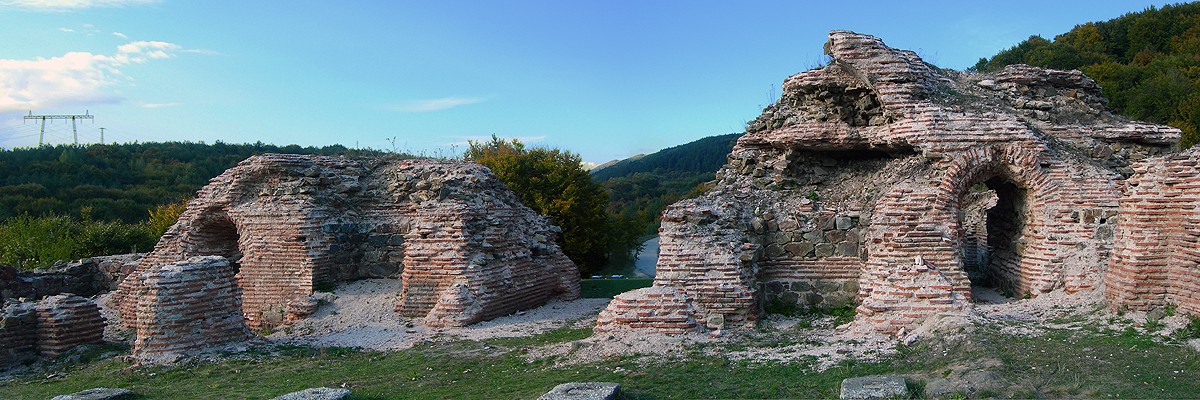
The fortress of Gate of Trajan

Sredna Gora has been continuously inhabited for thousands of years. Neolithic dwellings dating back to the 6th millennium BC have been discovered near Stara Zagora on the southeastern foothills of the mountain range. The eastern parts of Sredna Gora were the center of the Neolithic Karanovo culture that flourished between the 6th and the 4th millennium BC and has influenced the Thracian civilization. The Chalcolithic copper mines from Sredna Gora in the hamlet of Mechi Kladenets at 8 km northwest of Stara Zagora were the largest mining center in Europe in the 5th millennium BC. According to researchers' calculations it was possible to produce 1,000 tons of metal, a huge amount for that period. Copper from this deposit was used for the manufacture of Varna culture artifacts but has been discovered as far away as the middle Volga river. The Thracians inhabited the whole mountain range and archaeological remains of their presence have been discovered throughout Sredna Gora and the surrounding valleys. Only in the limited area of the valleys of Panagyurishte and Strelcha there are about 600 Thracian mounds. An important Thracian burial and cult complex was situated in the Chetinyova Mogila tumulus near Starosel on the southern slopes of Sredna Gora, which includes the largest underground temple in the Balkans. The capital of the Thracian Odrysian kingdom that thrived between the early 5th century BC and the 1st century BC, Seuthopolis, was situated in Kazanlak Valley on the northern foothills of the mountain range. Evidence of the wealth and power of the Thracian civilization in the region is the Panagyurishte Treasure dated from the 4th to 3rd century BC, consisting of nine vessels weighing over 6 kg of 24-karat gold. As the region was annexed by the Roman Empire by the 1st century BC, many earlier Thracian settlements saw further expansion as Roman cities, such as Beroe/Augusta Traiana (modern Stara Zagora), Diocletianopolis (Hisarya), Cabyle (near Yambol), etc. The strategic Roman road Via Militaris that connected Central Europe and Constantinople crossed the western section of Sredna Gora, where several road stations and forts were located. With the division of the Roman Empire in the 4th century AD, the region became part of the Eastern Roman (Byzantine) Empire.

In the Middle Ages the eastern areas of Sredna Gora were part of the region Zagore. Following the foundation of the First Bulgarian Empire in 681 north of the Balkan Mountains, Zagore was the first territory annexed by Bulgaria under the reign of khan Tervel (r. 700–721) and confirmed under the Byzantine–Bulgarian treaty of 716. In 976 the Bulgarian army under emperor (tsar) Samuel (r. 997–1014) dealt a crushing defeat to the Byzantines under emperor Basil II in the battle of the Gates of Trajan in the homonymous mountain pass of Sredna Gora. With the fall of the First Empire in 1018, the region was included in the Byzantine Empire until the Uprising of Asen and Peter in 1185, which restored the Bulgarian Empire. In the 13th century Sredna Gora along with several of the Sub-Balkan valleys to the north were the center of an important feudal domain ruled by the Smilets dynasty. In the period 1292–1298 the local boyar Smilets ruled as emperor of Bulgaria. After his death the lands in Sredna Gora were divided between his brother Voysil based in Kopsis to the west, and Aldimir of the Terter dynasty based in Kran to the east. The Ottoman invasion of the Balkans in the 14th century was met with stiff resistance in Sredna Gora. In 1355 the crown prince Michael Asen IV of Bulgaria was killed in the battle of Ihtiman against the invading Ottomans. The region was firmly included in the Ottoman Empire after the fall of Sofia in 1382 or 1385.

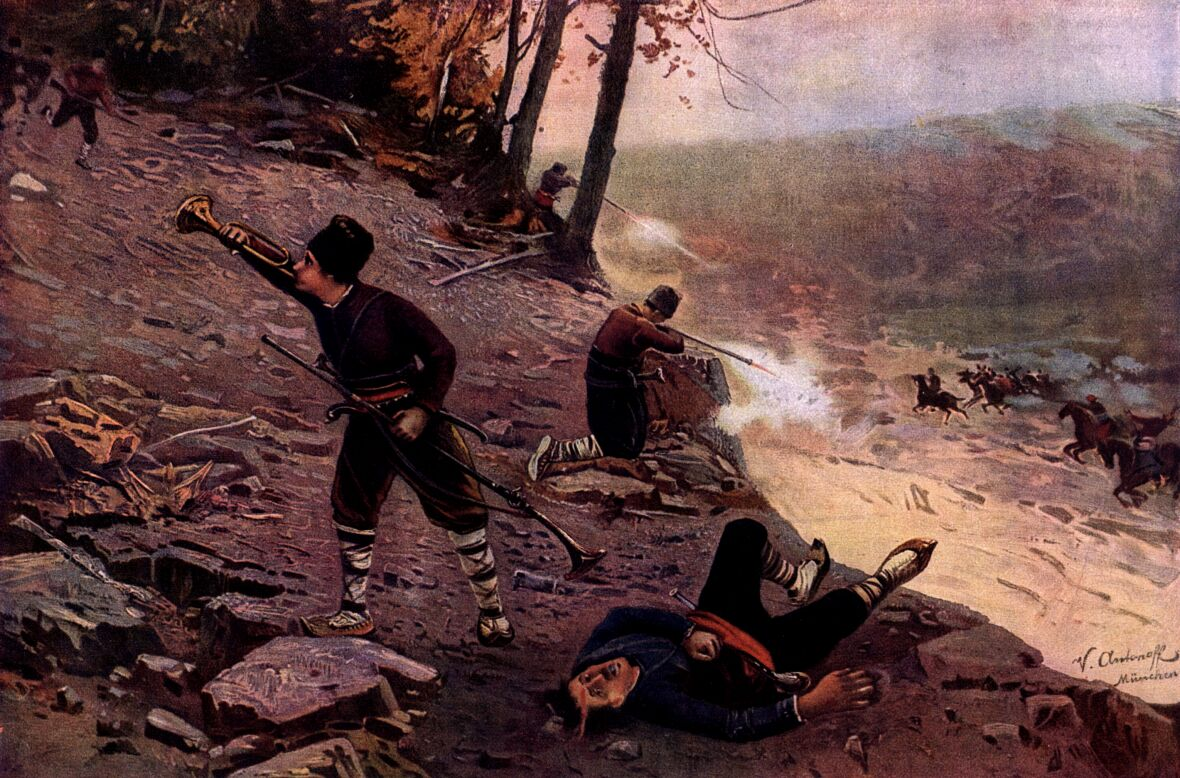
Bulgarian rebels fighting the Ottomans during the April Uprising

During Ottoman rule there were many haiduts based in Sredna Gora, with the names of at least 80 voivodes known only from Sashtinska Sredna Gora from the 18th and 19th centuries. By the late 18th and early 19th century many towns in the area, such as Panagyurishte and Koprivshtitsa, achieved some economic prosperity and actively participated in the Bulgarian National Revival, with many revolutionary, cultural and spiritual leaders based in the region. In 1876 western Sredna Gora was the center of the April Uprising against the Ottoman Empire. The beginning of the uprising was decided at an assembly in the Oborishte locality near Panagyurishte, which is considered as a precursor of the Bulgarian National Assembly, laying the foundations of the parliamentary democracy in Bulgaria. More than 30 settlements in the region rebelled and part of the decisive battles took place in Sredna Gora, at Eledzhik and Panagyuriste. When the Ottomans crushed the uprising, thousands were massacred and many settlements were pillaged and burned, including Panayurishte. The European-wide public outcry following the rebellion led to the Russo-Turkish War of 1877–1878, which saw action in Sredna Gora. Following the battle of Stara Zagora in July 1877, when the Russian–Bulgarian forces had to retreat to the Shipka Pass, the Ottomans burned down the city Stara Zagora, one of Bulgaria's largest at the time, and subjected its population to indiscriminate slaughter. The Liberation of Bulgaria in 1878 left Sredna Gora in the autonomous province of Eastern Rumelia, outside the borders of the reestablished Bulgarian state, the Principality of Bulgaria. On 2 September 1885 protests in Panagyurishte sparked the beginning of the Bulgarian unification, which was formally announced a few days later and successfully defended in the Serbo-Bulgarian War. The unification had a decisive impulse for the subsequent political and economic development of Bulgaria.

== Settlements and transportation ==
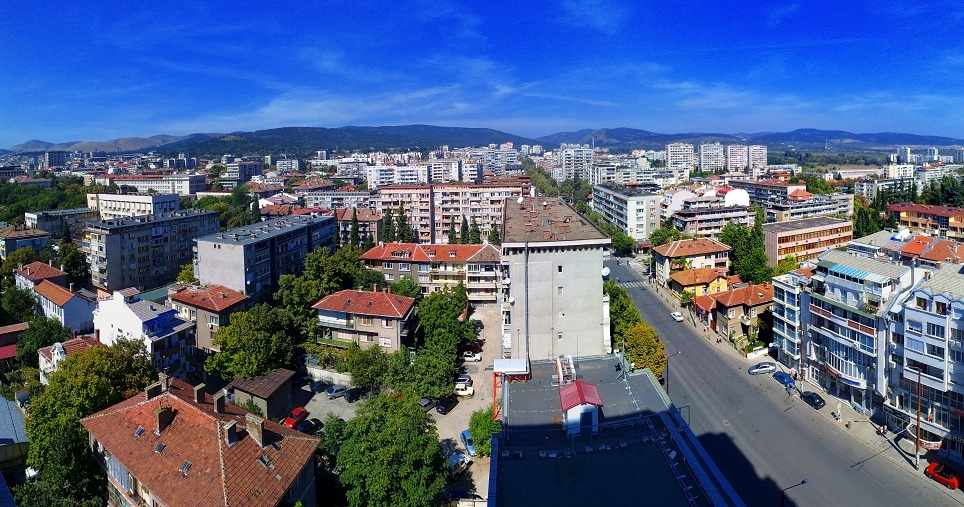
Stara Zagora, the largest city in Sredna Gora

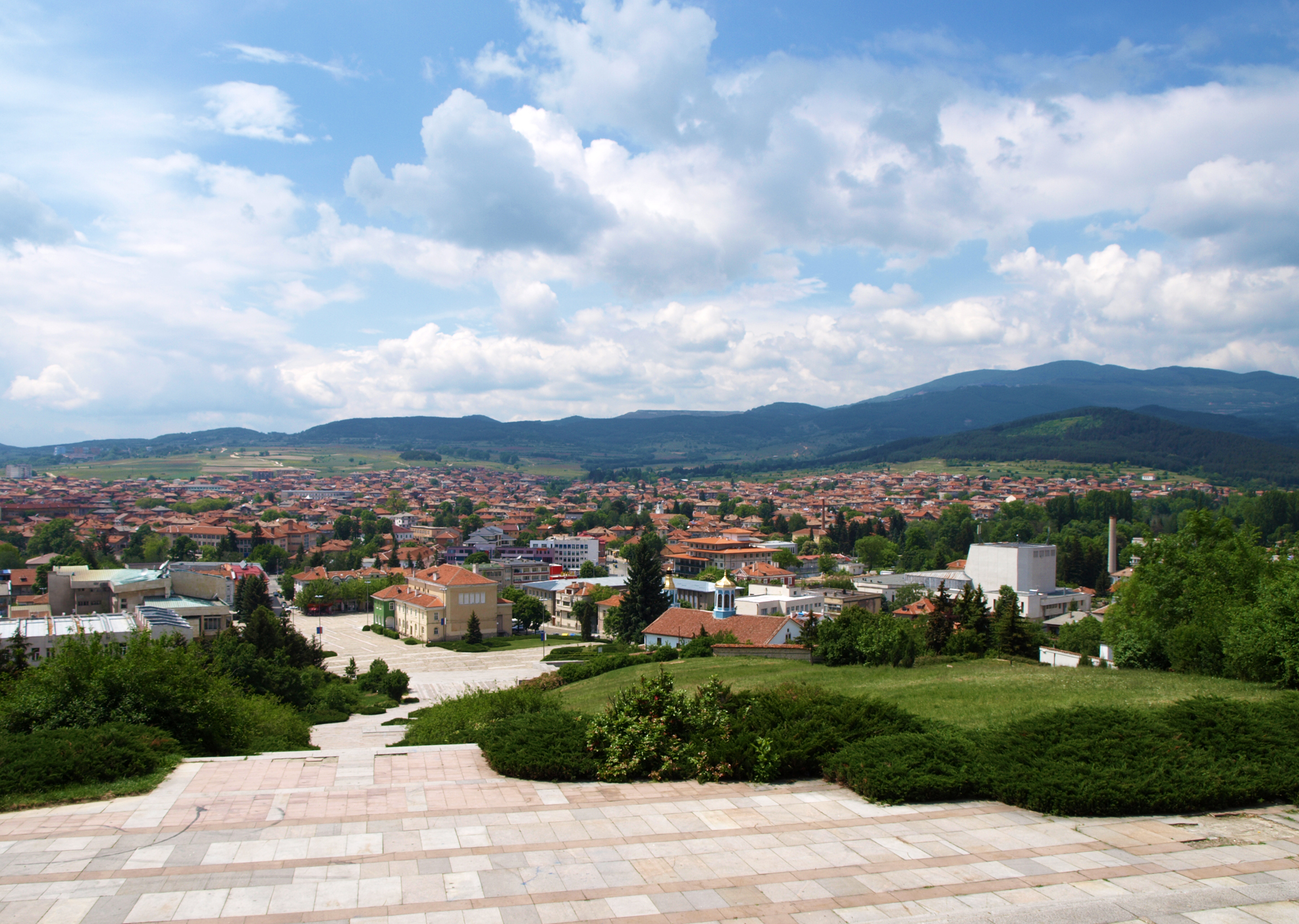
A view of Panagyurishte, an important economic, cultural and historical town in the region

There are numerous settlements in Sredna Gora and on its foothills, including 13 towns and many villages. Administratively, it falls in the provinces of Sofia, Pazardzhik, Plovdiv, Stara Zagora and Sliven. The largest city in Sredna Gora is Stara Zagora (pop. 136,144 as of 2022), situated on the southernmost slopes of Sarnena Sredna Gora and the Upper Thracian Plain. Other towns from west to east include Dolna Banya (4,730), Ihtiman (13,617), Momin Prohod (1,422), Kostenets (5,954), Vetren (2,888), Panagyurishte (16,424), Strelcha (4,069), Koprivshtitsa (2,032), Klisura (930), Hisarya (6,642), Banya (3,083) and Pavel Banya (2,639).

Due to its strategic location in the center of Bulgaria, Sredna Gora is crossed by several transportation arteries of national and international importance. Its settlements are served by numerous roads. In the west, a 79 km stretch of the Trakia motorway crosses Ihtimanska Sredna Gora in direction northwest-southeast between the villages of Novi Han and Kalugerovo. Almost parallel to the motorway between Hovi Han and Belovo is a 74.2 km section of the first class I-8 road Kalotina–Sofia–Plovdiv–Kapitan Andreevo. Both of them follow the European route E80 along their whole route. Along the northern periphery of the mountain range in direction west-east between the villages of Gorna Malina and Mirkovo passes a 36.8 km stretch of the first class I-6 road Gyueshevo–Sofia–Karlovo–Burgas. Through the Zmeyovski Pass in Sarnena Sredna Gora in direction north-south between the village of Yagoda and the city of Stara Zagora there is a 14.1 km section of the first class I-5 road Ruse–Veliko Tarnovo–Stara Zagora–Haskovo–Makaza. There are also a number of second and third class roads, including the entire 86.3 km length of the second class II-82 road Samokov–Kostenets–Sofia, a 55.4 km stretch of the second class II-37 road in the section Zlatitsa–Levski, a 5.9 km stretch of the second class II-64 road in the section Banya–Pesnopoy, a 5.2 km section of the second class II-53 road, a 16 km stretch of the second class II-55 road in the section Panicherevo–Asenovets, a 37 km section of the second class II-56 road in the section Pavel Banya–Zelenikovo and a 10.4 km section of the second class II-66 road in the section Zlati Voyvoda–Kamenovo.

There are several important railways in the mountain range served by the Bulgarian State Railways, including railway line No. 1 Kalotina–Sofia–Plovdiv–Svilengrad crossing Ihtimanska Sredna Gora in direction northwest-southeast, a significant section of railway line No. 3 Iliyantsi (Sofia)–Karlovo–Sliven–Karnobat–Varna following the northern foothills of Sredna Gora or the Sub-Balkan Valleys along most of their length in direction west-east, as well as part of railway line No. 4 Ruse–Gorna Oryahovitsa–Stara Zagora–Podkova along the Zmeyovski Pass in direction north-south. Crossing through the ridges connecting Sredna Gora to the Balkan Mountains along line No. 3 are the two longest tunnels in Bulgaria, Koznitsa (5,808 m) and Galabets (3,034 m). In addition, there are sections of two secondary railway lines in Sashtinska Sredna Gora, No. 81 Plovdiv–Panagyurishte and No. 82 Plovdiv–Karlovo. In 2021 the National Railway Infrastructure Company began the modernisation of railway line No. 1 along the whole Sredna Gora section that includes the construction of entirely new route with 13 tunnels with a total length of over 20 km, the longest being 6.7 km, as well as 24 bridges and viaducts. The planned investment is 665 million euro.

== Economy and tourism ==
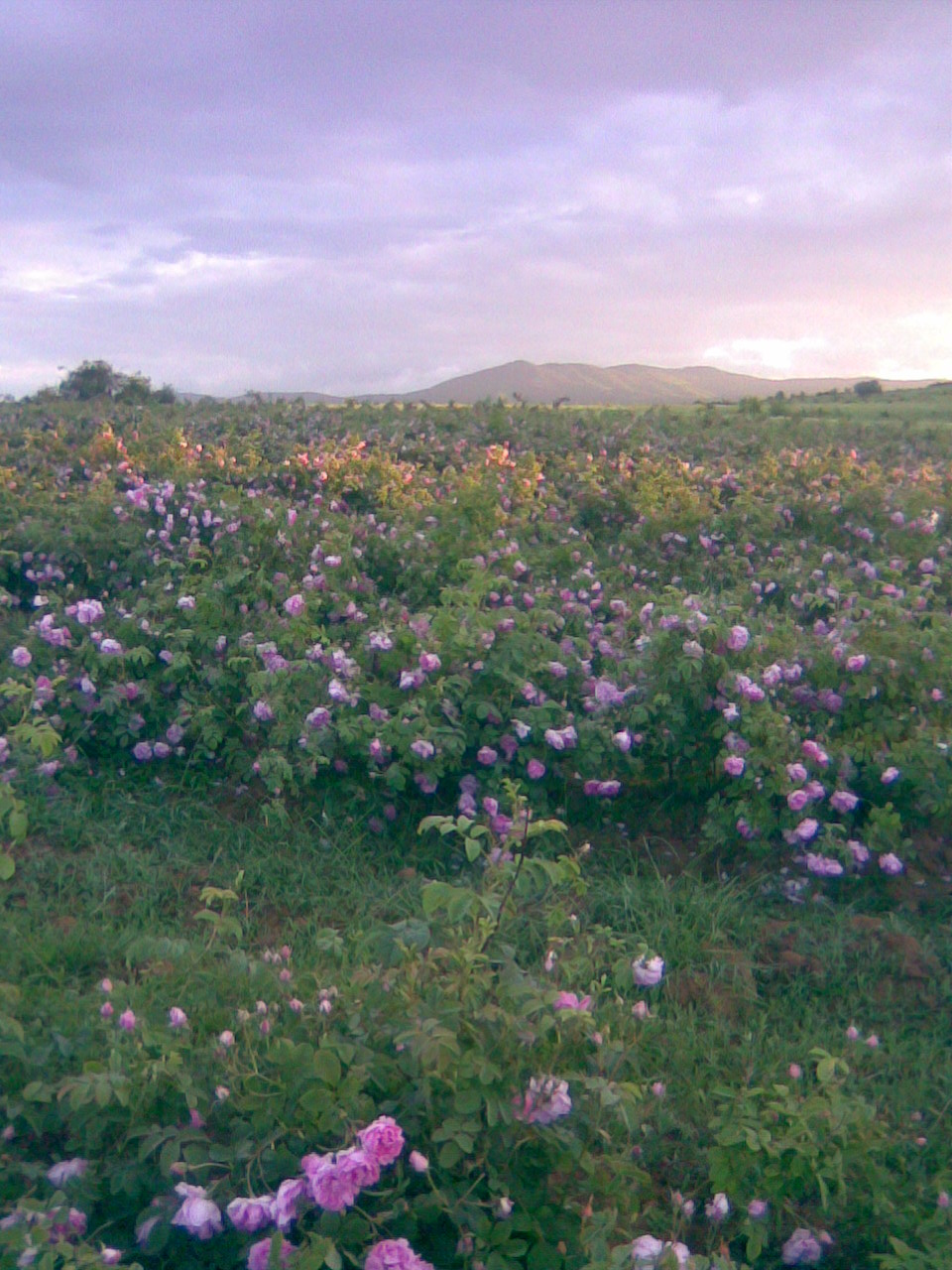
Rosa × damascena fields on the southern foothills of Sredna Gora

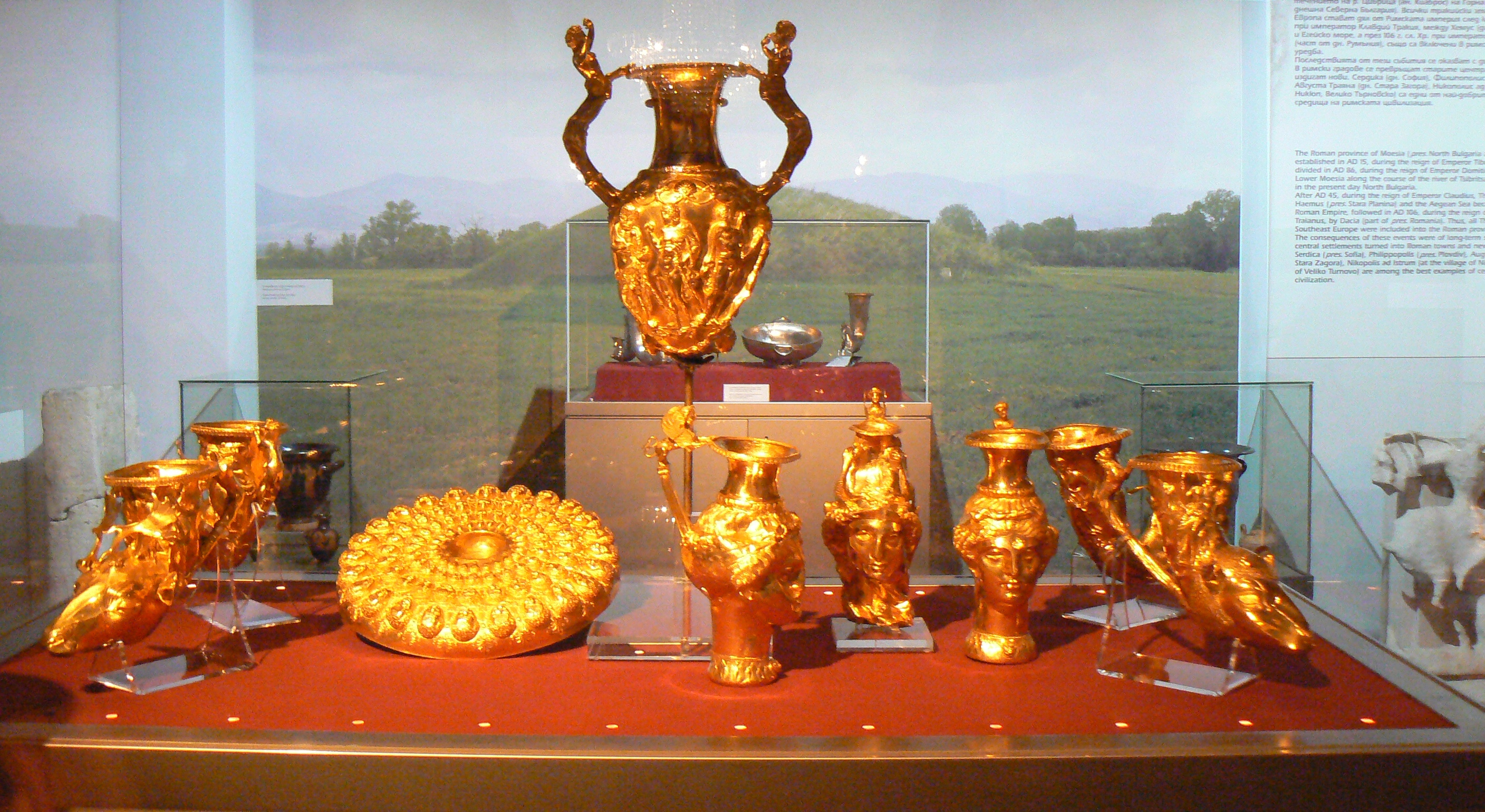
Panagyurishte Treasure

The economy is based on industry, services, agriculture and tourism. Sredna Gora contains major reserves of copper ore. The largest mining company is Asarel Medet based in Panagyurishte, which annually extracts and processes over 13 million tons of copper ore and produces 200 thousand tons of copper concentrate sold worldwide, including to the Pirdop copper smelter and refinery in the Zlatitsa–Pirdop Valley just north of the mountain range. It is the largest employer in the whole of Pazardzhik Province. Other copper deposits mined in the second half of the 20th century or in the early 2000s were at Medet, Elshitsa and Tsar Asen. At the village of Gabra is situated the Chukurovo mine — the oldest coal mine in Bulgaria, active since the mid 19th century, extracting lignite. Manufacturing industry in centred in Stara Zagora and Panagyurishte. The latter is the hub of the Bulgarian optical industry with two main companies — Opticoelectron and Optix. These companies operate production facilities in Panagyurishte, Strelcha and Popintsi and manufacture a wide range of military and civilian products, such as optical sights; thermal imaging devices; night vision goggles, scopes and systems; surveillance cameras; infrared lenses, etc. Other sectors are machine building and metalworking (Stara Zagora, Ihtiman, Kostenets, Koprivshtitsa), electronics (Stara Zagora), pulp and paper (Kostenets, Belovo), plastics (Panagyurishte), food processing (Stara Zagora, Panagyuriste, Kostenets), textiles (Panagyurishte, Kostenets), etc.

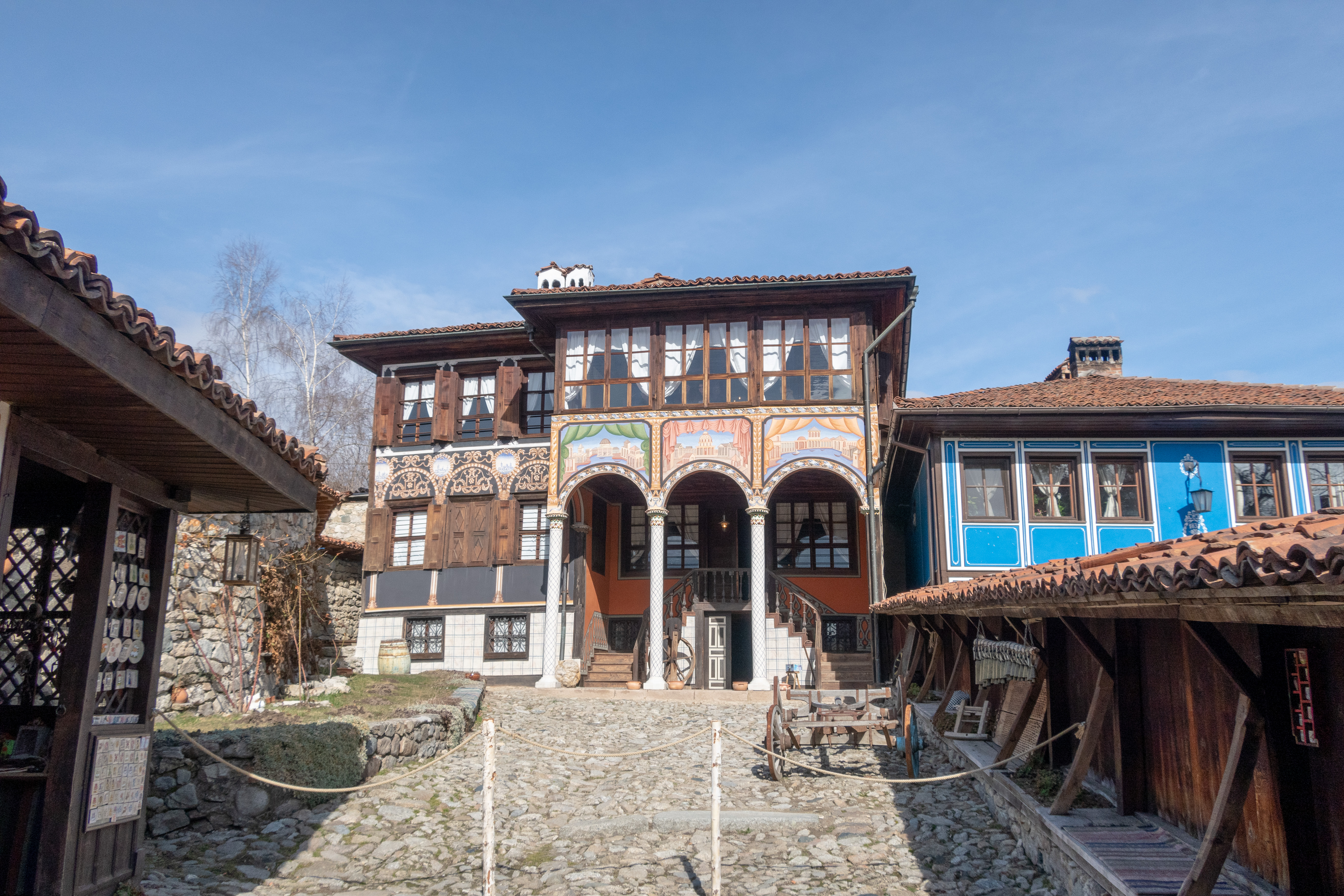
Traditional Bulgarian National Revival architecture in Koprivshtitsa

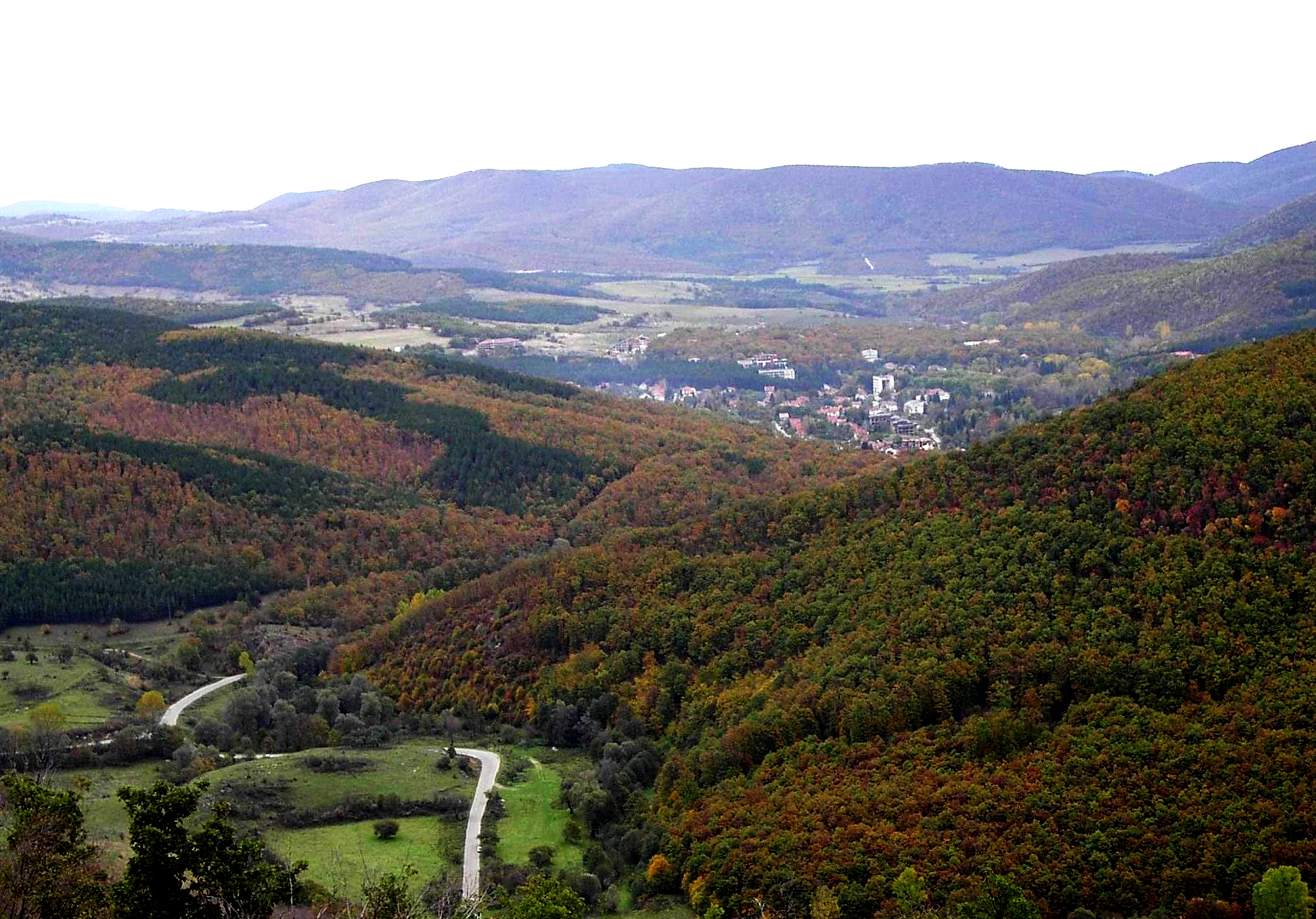
A view of Starozagorski bani

Agriculture is important in the valleys and the lower hilly areas of Sredna Gora. Along the southern slopes of Sashtinska and Sarnena Sredna Gora there are significant areas with vineyards, producing grapes. In the region around Strelcha and Breznik and in some of the valleys north of the mountain range there are favourable conditions for industrial crops, mainly for extraction of essential oils, such as Rosa × damascena, lavender and mint. The extensive pastures support livestock, the most important being sheep and cattle.

The rich natural, cultural, historical and architectural heritage of the mountain range is favourable for tourism and hospitality industry. The abundant mineral springs have been used for millennia and are now the backbone of the region's spa and health tourism. Nine of the nation's 19 spa resorts of national importance are located in Sredna Gora, almost half of them. The most developed resorts include Hisarya, Pavel Banya and Starozagorski bani among others. The former is the oldest regulated spa resort in Bulgaria since 1882 and is used for treatment and recreation. It has 22 springs with a total discharge of 70 L/sec and temperature of 47.8 °С. There are over 2,340 beds in hotels and sanatoria in the town; in 2019 it was visited by almost 140 thousand overnight tourists. In Pavel Banya there are seven mineral springs with a discharge of 15 L/sec and temperature of 19 °С to 61 °С. The resort receives 30 thousand visitors annually. Starozagorski bani, located 15 km northwest of the region's largest city Stara Zagora, contains springs with a total discharge of 18 L/sec and temperature of 51.5 °С.

The Neolithic Dwellings Museum in Stara Zagora preserves some Europe's earliest and best conserved building remains from the early Neolithic. There are many sanctuaries and megaliths from the Neolithic, such as the Buzovgrad Megalith. A number of Thracian burial and cult sites have been preserved in the mountain range, such as Chetinyova Mogila and Horizont near Starosel, the former is the largest excavated Thracian tumulus, while the latter is the only Thracian tomb with columns. Other important Thracian sites include Zhaba Mogila near Strelcha, the Smilovene Sanctuary deep in the mountain between Koprivshtitsa and Strelcha and the Kozi Gramadi complex north of Starosel. Important Roman heritage is preserved in Hisarya and Stara Zagora, the former containing 2.3 km long well-preserved defensive walls. The remains of medieval fortresses are scattered along the mountain range, including Urvich, Gate of Trajan and Krasen.

With its conserved national revival architecture, Koprivshtitsa is an architectural-historical reserve and one of the 100 Tourist Sites of Bulgaria. It contains two churches, schools and numerous houses, many of the converted to museums, belonging to important revolutionaries and cultural figures, such as Georgi Benkovski, Todor Kableshkov, Lyuben Karavelov, Nayden Gerov, etc. Another historical settlement with preserved traditional architecture is the village of Svezhen. The town of Panagyurishte was burned down by the Ottomans in 1876 and contains only a few surviving historical edifices, such as the house of Rayna Knyaginya. The Panagyurishte Museum of History exhibits at times the original Panagyurshte gold treasure along with the Plovdiv Regional Historical Museum and the National Historical Museum in Sofia.

== See also ==
- Geography of Bulgaria
- Balkan Mountains
- List of mountains in Bulgaria
- Sub-Balkan valleys
- Thracians
