= Starozagorski bani =

Starozagorski bani Старозагорски бани (Bulgarian)
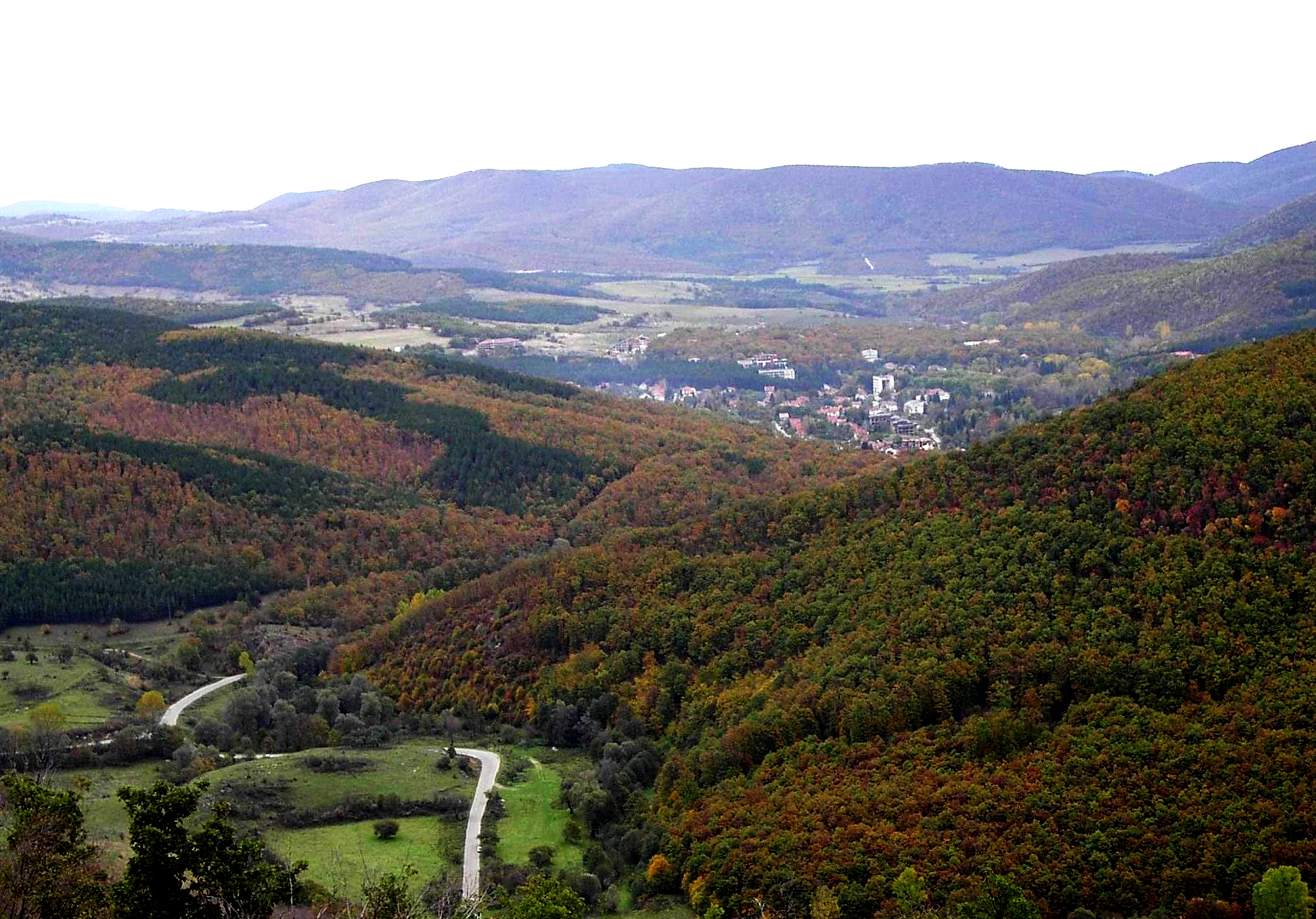

- Location of Starozagorski bani
- Coordinates: 42°26′59″N 25°29′54″E
- Country: Bulgaria
- Province: Stara Zagora
- Municipality: Stara Zagora

Government
  - Deputy-mayor: Stancho Zhelev Stanev

Area
  - Total: 0.8 km^{2} (0.31 sq mi)
- Elevation: 370 m (1,210 ft)

Population (Census February 2011 )
  - Total: 325
  - Density: 462.5/km^{2} (1,198/sq mi)
- Time zone: UTC+2 (EET)
  - Summer (DST): UTC+3 (EEST)
- Postal Code: 6062
- Area code: 04111

Starozagorski bani (Bulgarian: Старозагорски бани, literally translated as Stara Zagora Baths, sometimes referred to as Stara Zagora Spa) is a village and a mineral spring spa resort in central Bulgaria. It is located 15 km (9 mi) north-west of Stara Zagora, in the Sredna Gora mountain.

== History and geography ==
The village is situated in the valley of river Sazliyka, at 370 m (1,210 ft) above sea level. The surrounding mountain peaks rise up to 800 m (2,620 ft).

The mild climate and the hot mineral springs of the valley have attracted settlers since prehistory. A Neolithic settlement has been discovered around the mineral springs, close to today's main Thermal bath building. It existed there from around 6000 BC until the late Chalcolithic age, around 4000 BC. Many of the findings from the site's archeological excavations, mainly pottery, tools made of stone, horn, bone and copper, and other pieces of prehistoric art, are now displayed in the Neolithic Dwellings Museum in Stara Zagora.

An impressive 2500 m^{2} (26,900 sq ft) Roman thermae was also discovered in the village in 1965. It was built around the 2nd century AD and was used at least until the 12th century AD by the population of the Bulgarian village founded south of the thermae.

In 1967 the village gained the status national balneotherapy resort. This led to big investments in developing tourism in the area.

== Tourism ==
The economy of Starozagorski bani is dominated by tourism. There are many hotels and pensions offering mineral water spa services, restaurants, parks and sport facilities offering different outdoor recreation opportunities. Hiking trails lead into the surrounding mountains.

=== Mineral water ===
There are many mineral water springs in the territory of the village. The water springs with a 12-liter per second capacity, from a depth of around 1600 m (5250 ft), and with a temperature of around 40 °C (105 °F). It is lightly mineralized, containing hydro-carbonates, sulfates, calcium, magnesium, silica and fluorine. It is used for treating respiratory, kidney and stomach problems.

The biggest springs are developed into the resort's main Thermal bath building, with a couple of mineral water fountains outside. Other springs are used for providing spa and balneotherapy services by hotels and medical centers.

=== Virgin Mary's Footprint ===
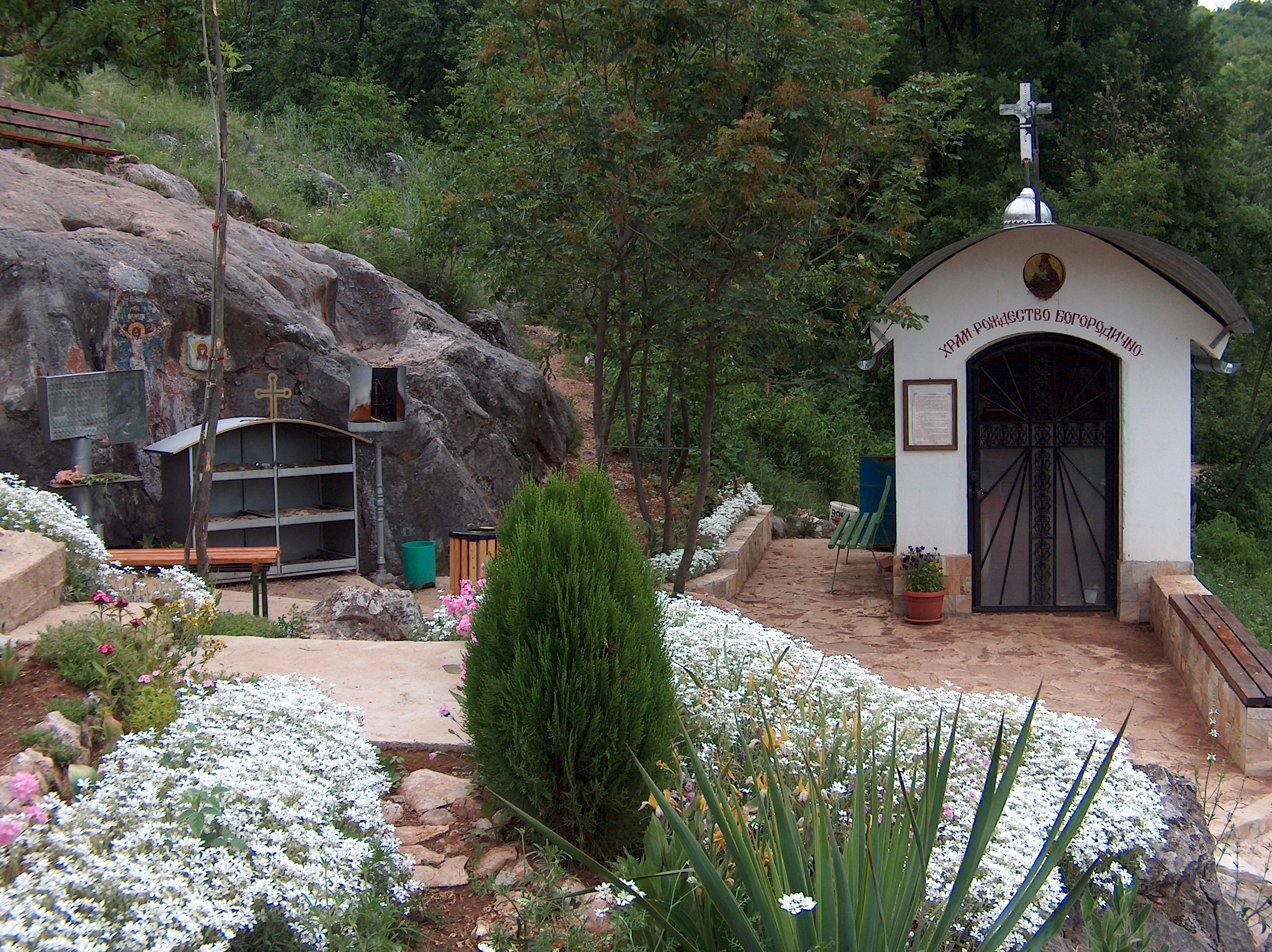
Virgin Mary's Footprint (inside the rock on the left), with the chapel

One of the most popular tourist attractions in Starozagorski bani is the site Virgin Mary's Footprint, situated north of the village. It gets its name due to a rock formation that looks like a giant human footprint inside of a rock. According to the legend, this is a footprint of the Virgin Mary, which is filled with water that never drains.

It is believed that the Virgin Mary's footprint is a sacred natural site for Christians, so a small chapel was built in the place called Birth of the Blessed Virgin Mary.

=== Starozagorski bani lake ===
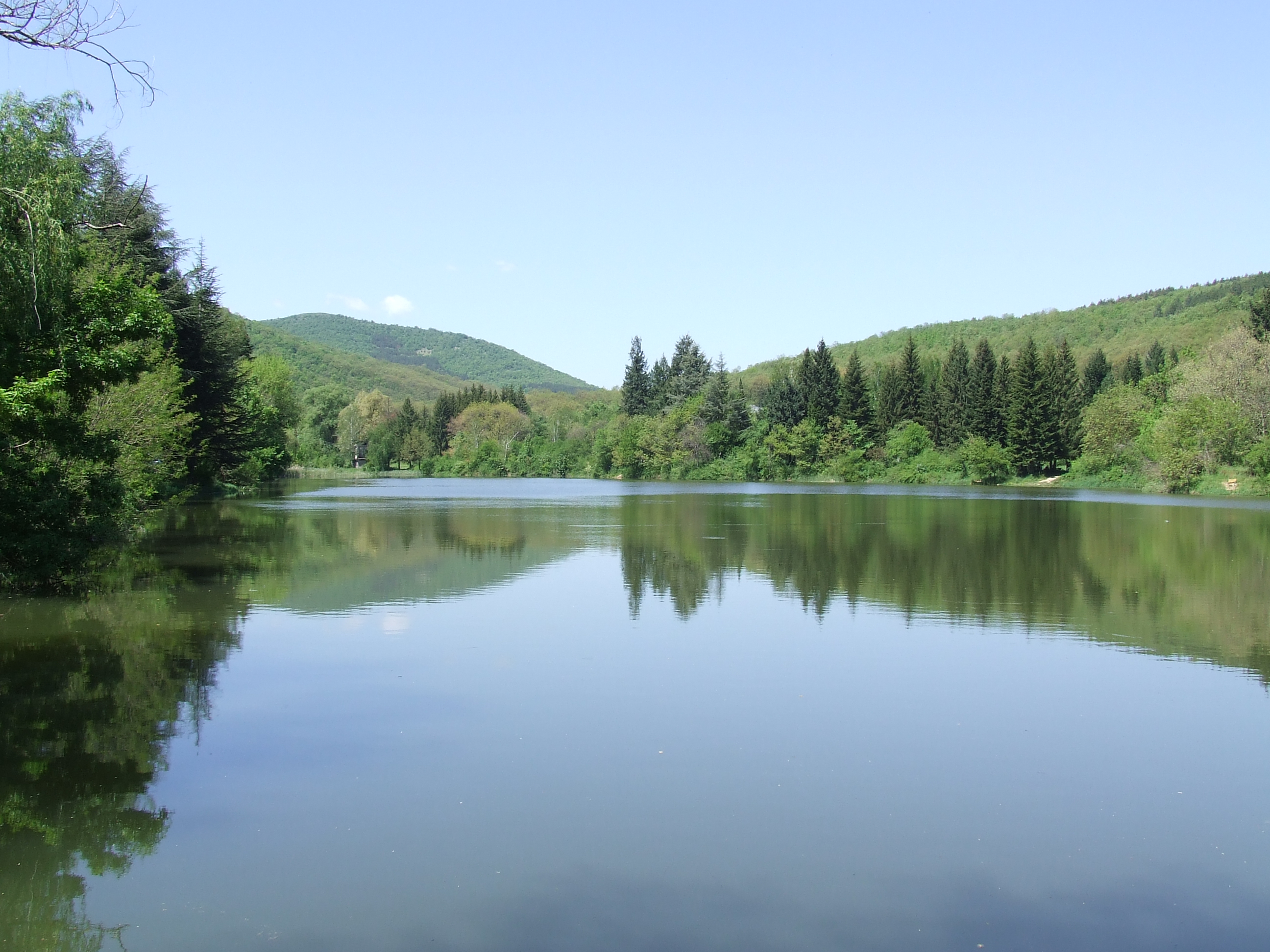
Starozagorski bani lake

The Starozagorski bani lake is situated in the south-western part of the resort. It is a popular recreation destination for hiking and fishing (for Crucian carp mainly).

=== Festivals ===
- Enyovden - The Day Of Herbs And Flowers - traditional festival, celebrated annually in the beginning of the summer
- Virgin Mary's Footprint National Thracian Folklore Fair - annual Thracian folklore event, which takes place every August since 2005
- 22 September - official holiday of Starozagorski bani, celebrated annually with various culture events

== Transport ==
Starozagorski bani is located on third-class road 6602 (according to the Bulgaria road numbering scheme), connecting Stara Zagora with the village of Pastrovo.

Multiple suburban bus lines (route numbers 9/9x) connect Starozagorski bani with Stara Zagora.
