= Potoka (river) =

Location
- Country: Bulgaria

Physical characteristics
- Source
  - location: Sredna Gora
  - coordinates: 42°24′12.96″N 24°21′11.16″E
  - elevation: 447 m (1,467 ft)
- Mouth
  - location: Maritsa
  - coordinates: 42°9′14.04″N 24°38′26.88″E
  - elevation: 170 m (560 ft)
- Length: 56 km (35 mi)
- Basin size: 423 km^{2} (163 sq mi)

Basin features
- Progression: Maritsa→ Aegean Sea

The Potoka (Bulgarian: Потока) is a river in southern Bulgaria, a left tributary of the river Maritsa, with a length of 56 km.

The river takes its source from a spring at an altitude of 447 m at the southern foothills of Sredna Gora mountain range, located near the road between the villages of Smilets and Svoboda. It flows in southeastern direction through the Upper Thracian Plain. Downstream of the town of Saedinenie the Potoka riverbed is corrected with protective dikes. It flows into the Maritsa at an altitude of 170 m off the village of Orizare.

Its drainage basin covers a territory of 423 km^{2} or 0.8% of Maritsa's total and borders the drainage basins of the Luda Yana to the southwest and the Pyasachnik to the northeast, both left tributaries of the Maritsa.

The Pyasachnik has predominantly rain-snow feed with high water in February–May and low water in July–October.

There are two settlements along its course: the village of Topoli Dol in Pazardzhik Municipality, Pazardzhik Province and the town of Saedinenie in Saedinenie Municipality, Plovdiv Province. A large portion of the Panagyurishte–Plovdiv railway follows its valley. The river's waters are utilised for irrigation for the intensive agriculture in the Upper Thracian Plain.
