= II-64 road (Bulgaria) =

Road in Bulgaria

Republic Road I-64
- Републикански път I-64

Route information
- Length: 54.5 km (33.9 mi)

Major junctions
- From: Km 268.5 of I-6, Karlovo
- To: Km 226.9 of I-8, Plovdiv

Location
- Country: Bulgaria
- Towns: Karlovo, Banya, Plovdiv

Highway system
- Highways in Bulgaria

Republican Road II-64 (Bulgarian: Републикански път II-64) is a 2nd class road in Bulgaria, running in direction north–south entirely through the territory of Plovdiv Province. Its length is 54.5 km.

== Route description ==
The road starts at Km 268.5 of the first class I-6 road in the southeastern part of the town of Karlovo and heads south through the Karlovo Valley. It passes through the western reaches of the spa town of Banya, crosses the river Stryama, goes through the easternmost part of the Sashtinska Sredna Gora mountain range and at the village of Pesnopoy enters the Upper Thracian Plain. It continues southwards passing through the villages of Dolna Mahala, Chernozemen, Graf Ignatievo and Trud, forms a junction with the Trakia motorway at the latter's Km 127 and in the northern neighbourhoods of the city of Plovdiv it reaches its terminus at Km 226.9 of the first class I-8 road.
