= Golyam Bogdan =

Mountain

- Bogdan
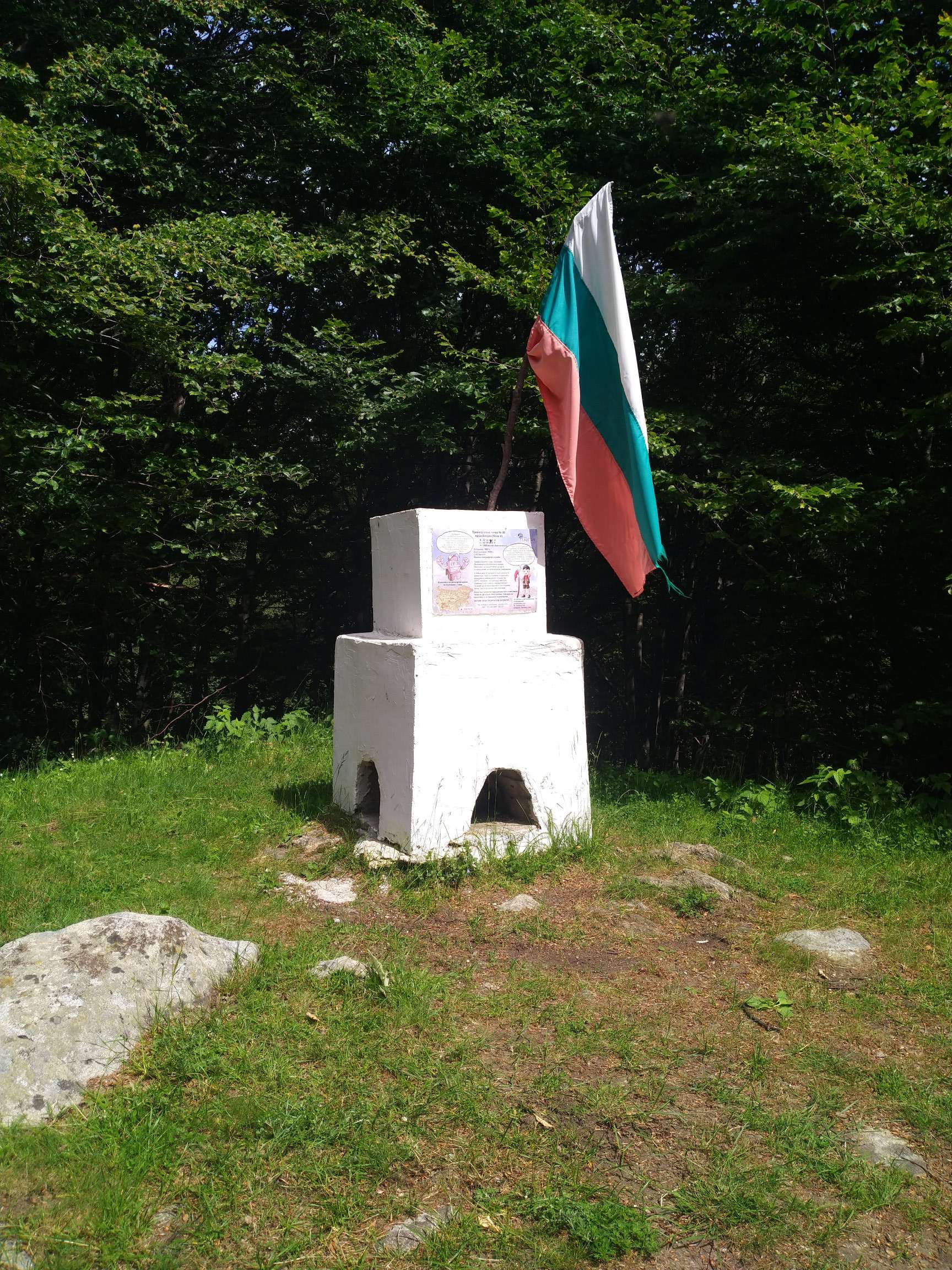
- Golyam Bogdan Peak

Highest point
- Elevation: 1604
- Coordinates: 42.607278°N 24.4615°E

Naming
- Etymology: Named after a Bulgarian Hajduk - Bogdan Voyvoda
- Native name: Голям Богдан (Bulgarian)

Geography
- Location within Bulgaria

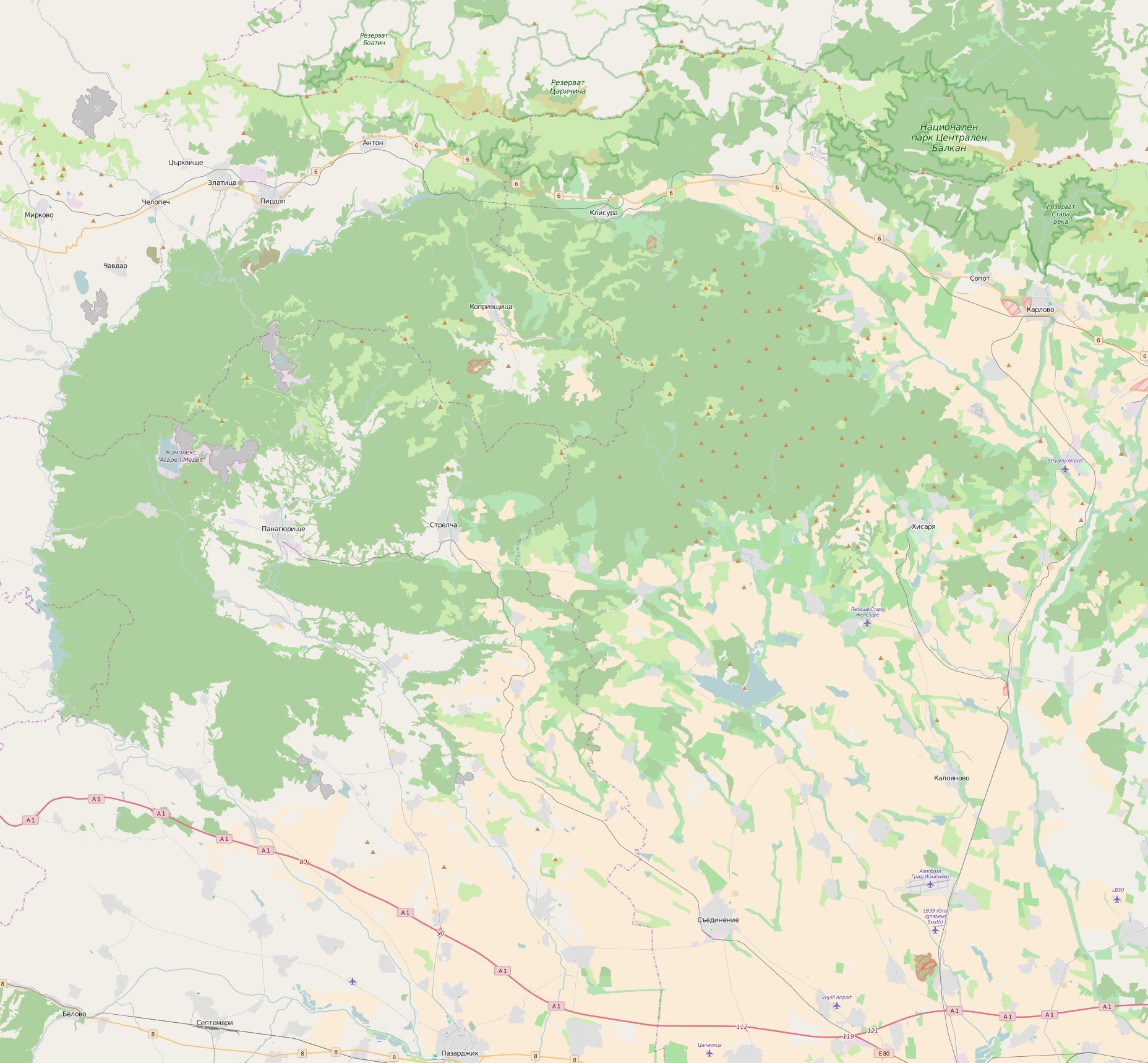
- Golyam Bogdan on the Map of Bulgaria
- Location: Sofia Province, Bulgaria

Golyam Bodan, also known as Bogdan, is the highest peak (1604 m) in the Sredna Gora geographical area in Bulgaria.

== Location ==
Golyam Bogdan is surrounded by forests on all sides. Looking from its elevation toward the South, and the North, there is a beautiful landscape and a view toward Barikadi and Vylk, two summits in the Balkan Mountains. On the steep South side of the summit, there is a beech forest. Along the beech forest, there are large rocks, covered in moss - the so called "Detelinova Peshtera", an attraction often visited by hiking tourists.

Two rivers stream from Golyam Bogdan - Pyasachnik, Kriva reka, and Luda Yana.

== Etymology ==
The name of the peak comes from the legendary Bulgarian freedom fighter - haydutin Bogdan Voyvoda.

== Wildlife Sanctuary ==
In 1972, the area around the peak was protected as a wildlife sanctuary and a natural heritage area. The main reason for that is the centuries old beech forest. Other possible sight seeings nearby include the "Detelinova Gramada", and the "Donkina Gora" or Donkina forest, that was also made a wildlife sanctuary in 1979.

In the area, the rare and endangered Aquila Heliacal, the Eastern Imperial Eagle, can be seen.
