= Pyasachnik =

Location
- Country: Bulgaria

Physical characteristics
- Source
  - location: W of Shiligarka, Sredna Gora
  - coordinates: 42°36′6.12″N 24°29′3.84″E
  - elevation: 1,512 m (4,961 ft)
- Mouth
  - location: Maritsa
  - coordinates: 42°9′43.92″N 24°46′50.16″E
  - elevation: 155 m (509 ft)
- Length: 72 km (45 mi)
- Basin size: 663 km^{2} (256 sq mi)

Basin features
- Progression: Maritsa→ Aegean Sea

The Pyasachnik (Bulgarian: Пясъчник) is a river in southern Bulgaria, a left tributary of the river Maritsa, with a length of 72 km.

The river takes its source at an altitude of 1,512 m at 300 m west of the summit of Shiligarka (1,577 m) in the mountain range of Sredna Gora. Its source lies a few kilometers southeast of Sredna Gora's highest summit, Golyam Bogdan (1,604 m). The Pyasachnik flows in southern–southeastern direction along its whole course, initially in a deep valley until the village of Starosel. Following the Pyasachnik Reservoir a few kilometers downstream of the village, the river flows through the Upper Thracian Plain, where the sandy riverbed is corrected with protective dikes. It flows into the Maritsa at an altitude of 155 m in the northeastern neighbourhoods of the city of Plovdiv.

Its drainage basin covers a territory of 663 km^{2} or 1.25% of Maritsa's total and borders the drainage basins of the Luda Yana to the northwest, the Potoka to the southwest, and the Stryama to the north, northeast and east, all of them left tributaries of the Maritsa.

The Pyasachnik has predominantly rain-snow feed with high water in February–June and low water in July–October. The average annual flow near the village of Lyuben is 2.3 m^{3}/s.

The river flows entirely in Plovdiv Province. There are five settlements along its course: the village of Starosel in Hisarya Municipality and the villages of Tseretelevo and Nedeleno in Saedinenie Municipality, the village of Trud in Maritsa Municipality and the city of Plovdviv. A 10 km stretch of the third class III-606 road Koprivshtitsa–Strelcha–Trud follows its valley between Pyasachnik Reservoir and the village of Golyam Chardak. The river's waters are utilised for irrigation for the intensive agriculture in the Upper Thracian Plain.

About 2 km upstream of Starosel, along the Pyasachnik's left banks is located Chetinyova Mogila — an important Thracian tumulus, hosting an underground temple and a mausoleum.
