= Kamenovo, Sliven Province =

Kamenovo Каменово
- Location of Kamenovo, Bulgaria
- Coordinates: 42°32′32.47″N 26°6′4.81″E
- Country: Bulgaria
- Provinces (Oblast): Sliven Province

Government
  - Mayor: Dinko Ivanov
- Elevation: 175 m (574 ft)

Population (15.09.2022)
  - Total: 478
- Time zone: UTC+2 (EET)
  - Summer (DST): UTC+3 (EEST)
- Postal Code: 8928
- Area codes: 04524 from Bulgaria, 003594524 from outside

Kamenovo (Bulgarian: Каменово) is a village in central Bulgaria. It has a population of 478 as of 2022.

== Geography ==
Kamenovo is located in Sliven Province and has a territory of 15.006 km^{2}. It is part of Nova Zagora Municipality. It is situated 9 km northeast of the municipal center Nova Zagora, 24 km southwest of the city of Sliven and 41 km northeast of the city of Stara Zagora. The village lies on the second class II-66 road that connects Sliven, Nova Zagora, Stara Zagora and Chirpan.

Kamenovo is situated in the Upper Thracian Plain, at the southern foothills of the Sredna Gora mountain range. Its altitude at the central square and the chitalishte is 170 m, which increases to 180–190 m in its northern reaches.
