= Pesnopoy, Plovdiv Province =

Pesnopoy Песнпой
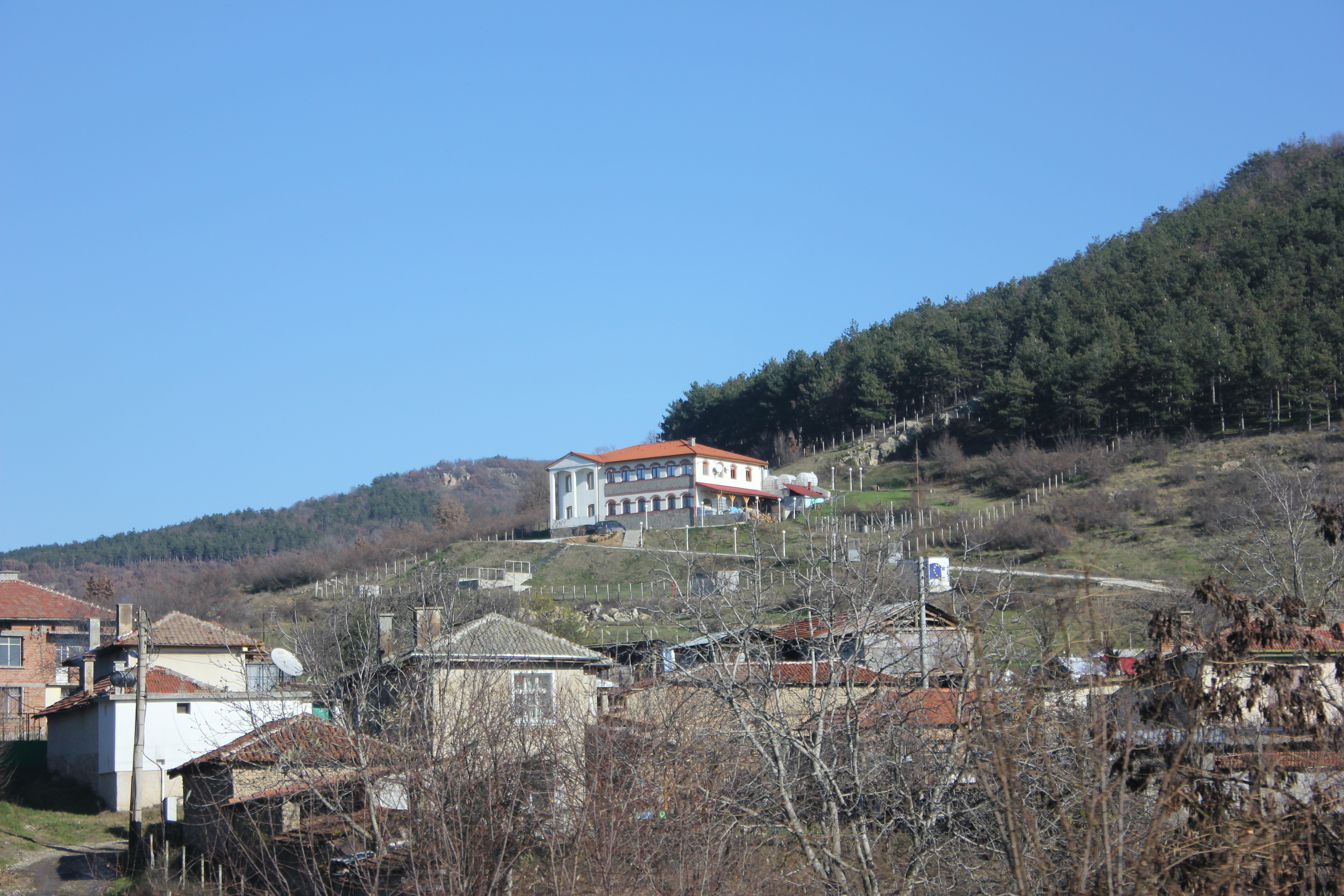

- Location of Pesnopoy, Bulgaria
- Coordinates: 42°29′13.46″N 24°48′26.4″E
- Country: Bulgaria
- Provinces (Oblast): Plovdiv Province

Government
  - Mayor: Vidol Lazarov
- Elevation: 274 m (899 ft)

Population (15.09.2022)
  - Total: 434
- Time zone: UTC+2 (EET)
  - Summer (DST): UTC+3 (EEST)
- Postal Code: 4208
- Area codes: 031708 from Bulgaria, 0035931708 from outside

Pesnopoy (Bulgarian: Песнопой) is a village in central Bulgaria. It has a population of 434 as of 2022.

== Geography ==
Pesnopoy is located in Plovdiv Province and has a territory of 32.046 km^{2}. It is part of Kaloyanovo Municipality. Closest towns are the spa resorts of Hisarya to the west and Banya to the north, both at less than 10 km.

The village is served by the second class II-64 road in the section Plovdiv–Karlovo and railway line No. 82 Plovdiv–Karlovo.

Pesnopoy is situated close to the right bank of the river Stryama in the Upper Thracian Plain, at the southern foothills of the Sredna Gora mountain range. There is a mineral spring and a public bath.
