= Krasnovo =

Krasnovo Красново
- Village
- Location within Vladimir Oblast Location within Russia
- Coordinates: 55°28′N 41°41′E
- Country: Russia
- Region: Vladimir Oblast
- District: Melenkovsky District
- Time zone: UTC+3:00

Krasnovo (Russian: Красново) is a rural locality (a village) in Denyatinskoye Rural Settlement, Melenkovsky District, Vladimir Oblast, Russia. The population was 27 as of 2010.

== Geography ==
Krasnovo is located on the Chyornaya River, 16 km north of Melenki (the district's administrative centre) by road. Denyatino is the nearest rural locality.
