= Saedinenie, Plovdiv Province =

Saedinenie Съединение
- Town
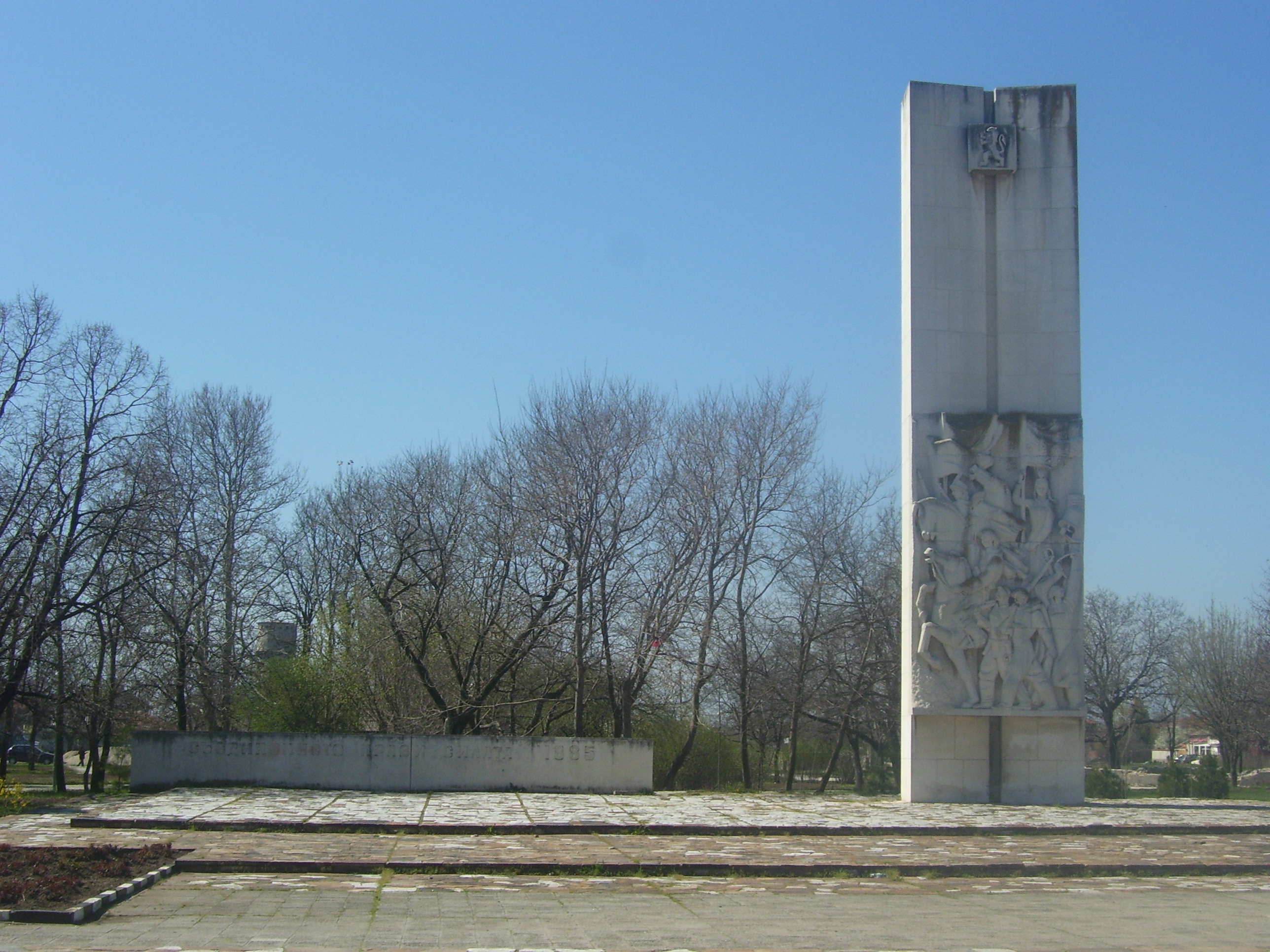
- National Monument in Saedinenie

- Location in Bulgaria
- Coordinates: 42°16′N 24°33′E
- Country: Bulgaria
- Province: Plovdiv
- Municipality: Saedinenie Municipality

Government
  - Mayor: Georgi Rumenov (BANU)

Area
  - Total: 100.2 km^{2} (38.7 sq mi)
- Elevation: 204 m (669 ft)

Population (2021)
  - Total: 5,141
- Postal code: 4190
- Area code: 0318
- Vehicle registration: РВ

Saedinenie (Bulgarian: Съединение [sɐɛdiˈnɛnie], until 1934 Golyamo Konare Bulgarian: Голямо Конаре) is a town in the Plovdiv Province, central Bulgaria. As of the 2021 Bulgarian Census, the population was 5,141. There is a new electronics plant there with 300 employees.

== Honour ==
Saedinenie Snowfield on Livingston Island in the South Shetland Islands, Antarctica is named the town of Saedinenie in association with the 120th anniversary of the Reunification of the Principality of Bulgaria and the province of Eastern Rumelia in 1885.
