= Neolithic Dwellings Museum =

Museum in Stara Zagora, Bulgaria

Coordinates: 42.4243°N 25.6101°E

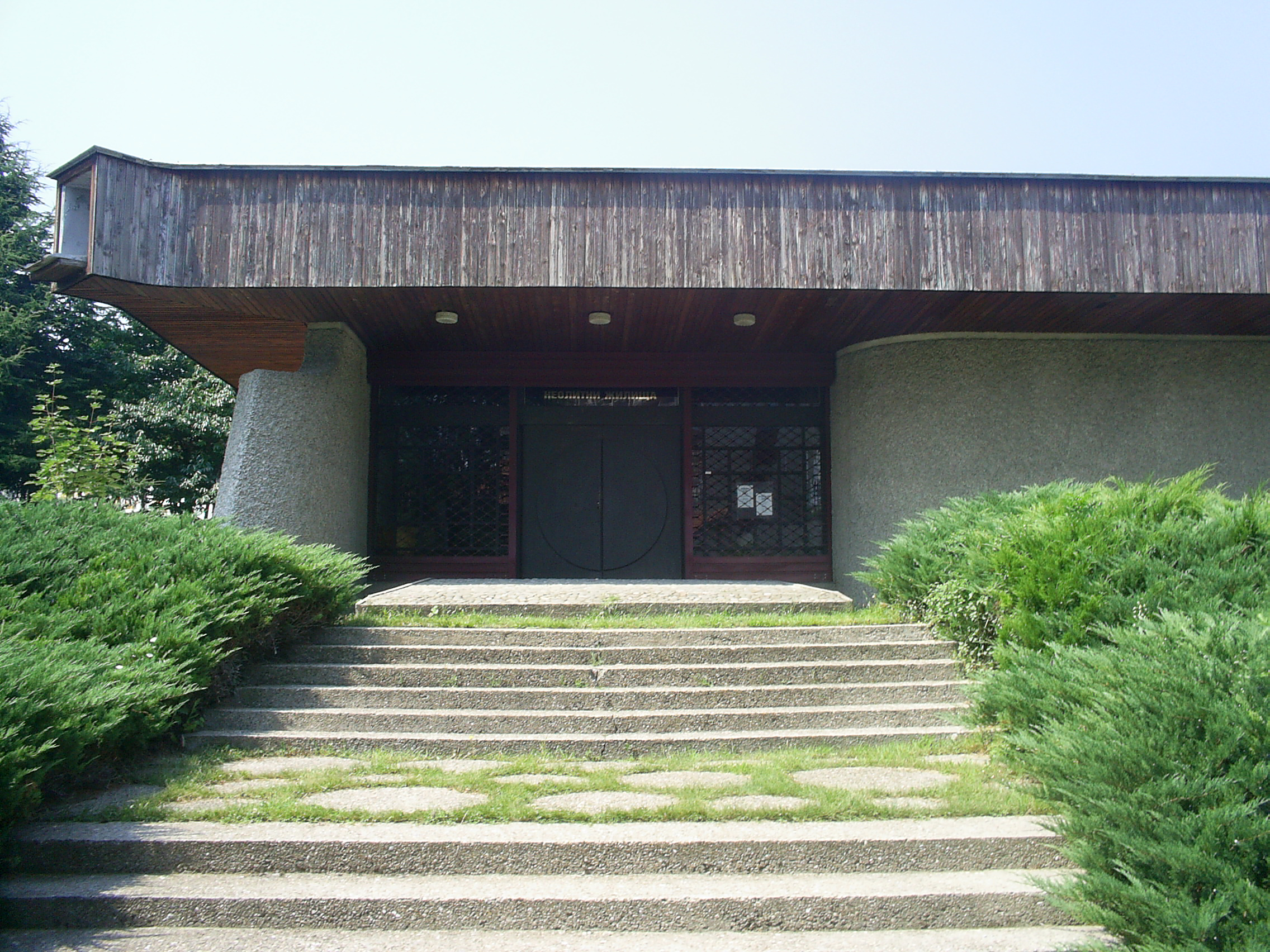
Museum building exterior

Neolithic Dwellings Museum in Stara Zagora, Bulgaria is a museum in Stara Zagora, Bulgaria, which contains ruins of two of the oldest surviving buildings in the world.

The Neolithic Dwellings Museum in Stara Zagora, Bulgaria was created in 1979. It is a branch of The Stara Zagora Regional Historical Museum. The Neolithic Dwellings Museum is built around two Neolithic houses dating back to the 6th millennium BC. 1826 artifacts were found there. The Neolithic dwellings are the best-preserved in Europe from this period. Kitchens, fireplaces, hand grain mills, and ceramic vessels comprise the richest inventory of 6th millennium BC prehistoric house life in Europe. The prehistoric art exhibition displays 333 of the most important finds from the Neolithic and Chalcolithic periods (6th millennium BC – 3rd millennium BC).

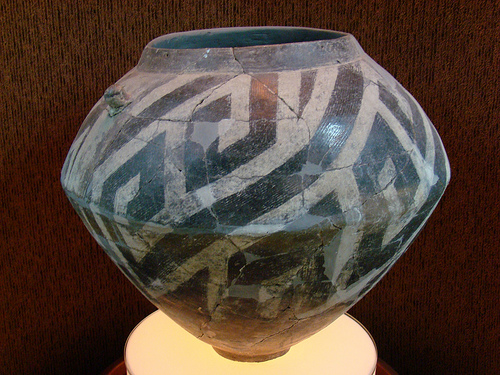
Karanovo culture ceramic vessel, 6th millennium BC

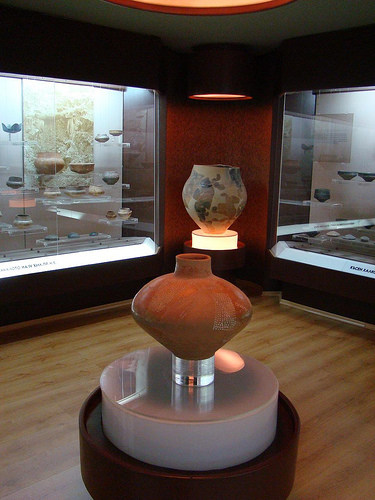
Museum building interior

== See also ==
- List of the oldest buildings in the world
- Old Europe (archaeology)
