= Gorna Malina Municipality =

Coordinates: 42°40′59″N 23°42′0″E

Gorna Malina Municipality Община Горна Малина
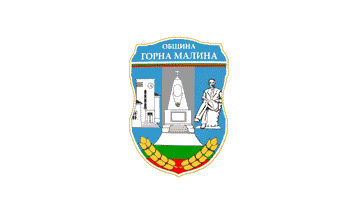
- Flag

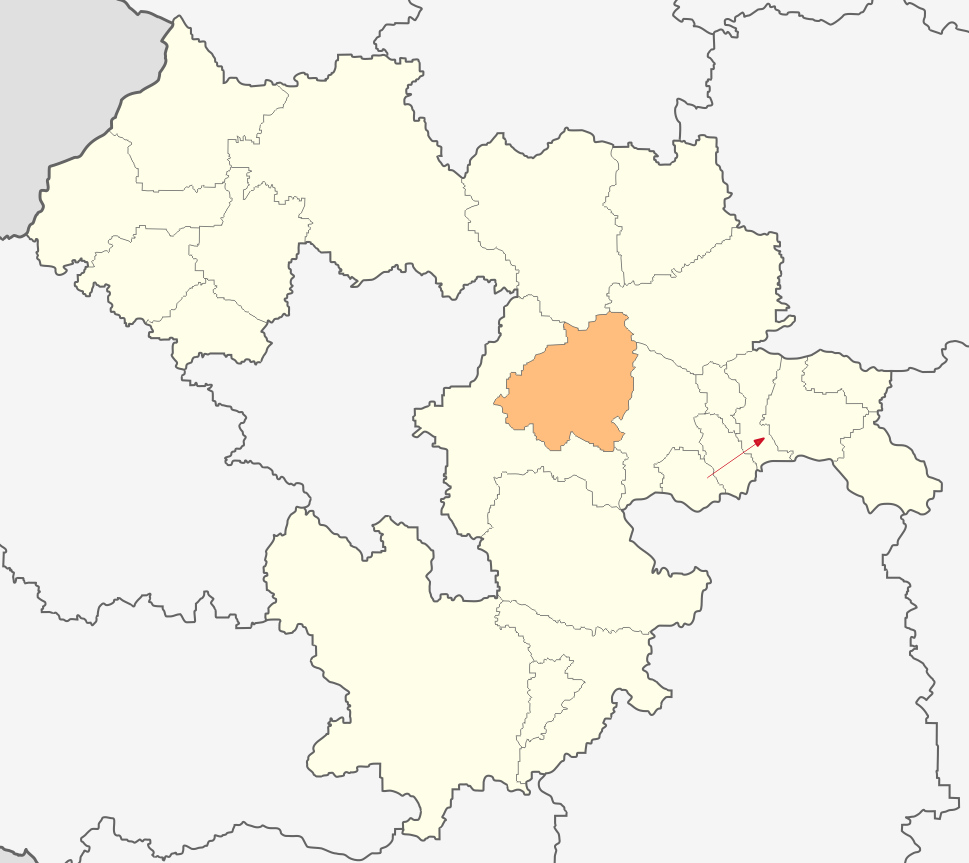
- Country: Bulgaria
- Province: Sofia Province
- Seat: Gorna Malina

Area
  - Total: 295.4 km^{2} (114.1 sq mi)

Population (2024)
  - Total: 6,258
  - Density: 21.18/km^{2} (54.87/sq mi)
- Website: www.gornamalina.bg

Gorna Malina Municipality (Bulgarian: Община Горна Малина) is a municipality in Sofia Province, central western Bulgaria. Covering a territory of 295.4 km^{2}, it is the eleventh largest of the 22 municipalities in the province and takes 4.17% of its total area. It is among the few municipalities of Bulgaria that consists only of villages.

== Geography ==
The relief of the municipality is varied. To the north lies the main ridge of the Balkan Mountains. In the central part are located the easternmost reaches of the Sofia Valley and the entirety of the small Saranska and Kamarska Valleys, all of them part of the Sub-Balkan valleys. To the south are the northern slopes of the Sredna Gora mountain range. The highest point is the summit of Zvezdets (1,655 m) in the Balkan Mountains.

Most of its territory is drained by the river Makotsevska reka, a right tributary of the Lesnovska reka, itself a right tributary of the Iskar of the Danube drainage.

== Transport ==
Gorna Malina Municipality is traversed by five roads of the national network with a total length of 67 km, including a 3.5 km section of the Hemus motorway (A2), a 48.9 km stretch of the first class I-1 road Vidin–Sofia–Blagoevgrad–Kulata, a 29 km section of the first class I-6 road Gyueshevo–Sofia–Karlovo–Burgas, the whole 9.3 km length of the third class III-1001 road, and the first 22.3 km of the third class III-6004 road.

It is traversed by a 25.3 km section of railway line No. 3 Sofia–Karlovo–Sliven–Karnobat–Varna.

== Demography ==
The population is 6,258 as of 2024.

There are 14 villages in Gorna Malina Municipality:

- Aprilovo
- Bailovo
- Belopoptsi
- Chekanchevo
- Gaytanevo
- Dolna Malina
- Dolno Kamartsi
- Gorna Malina
- Gorno Kamartsi
- Makotsevo
- Negushevo
- Osoitsa
- Sarantsi
- Stargel

== Gallery ==
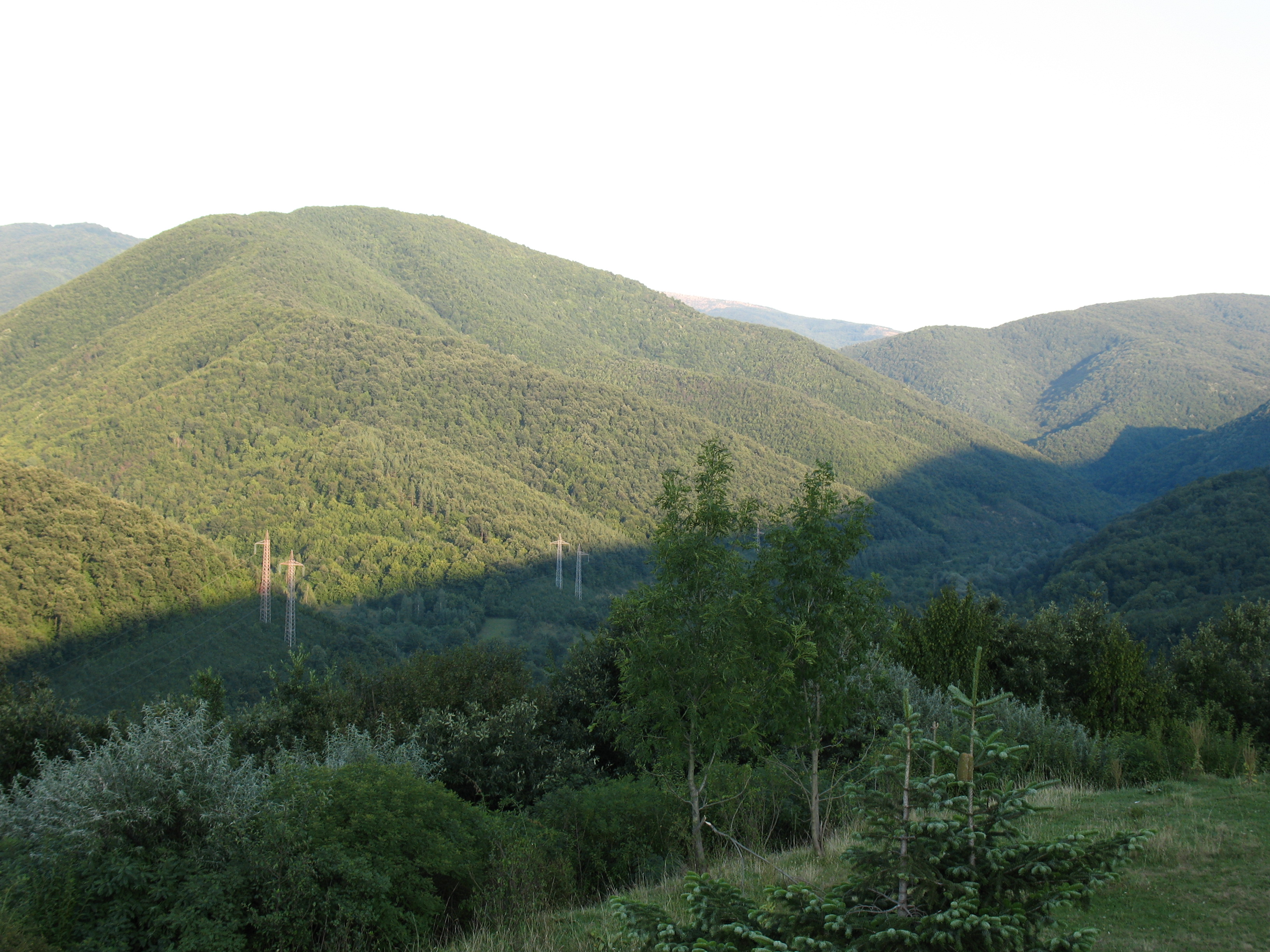
Arabakonak Pass

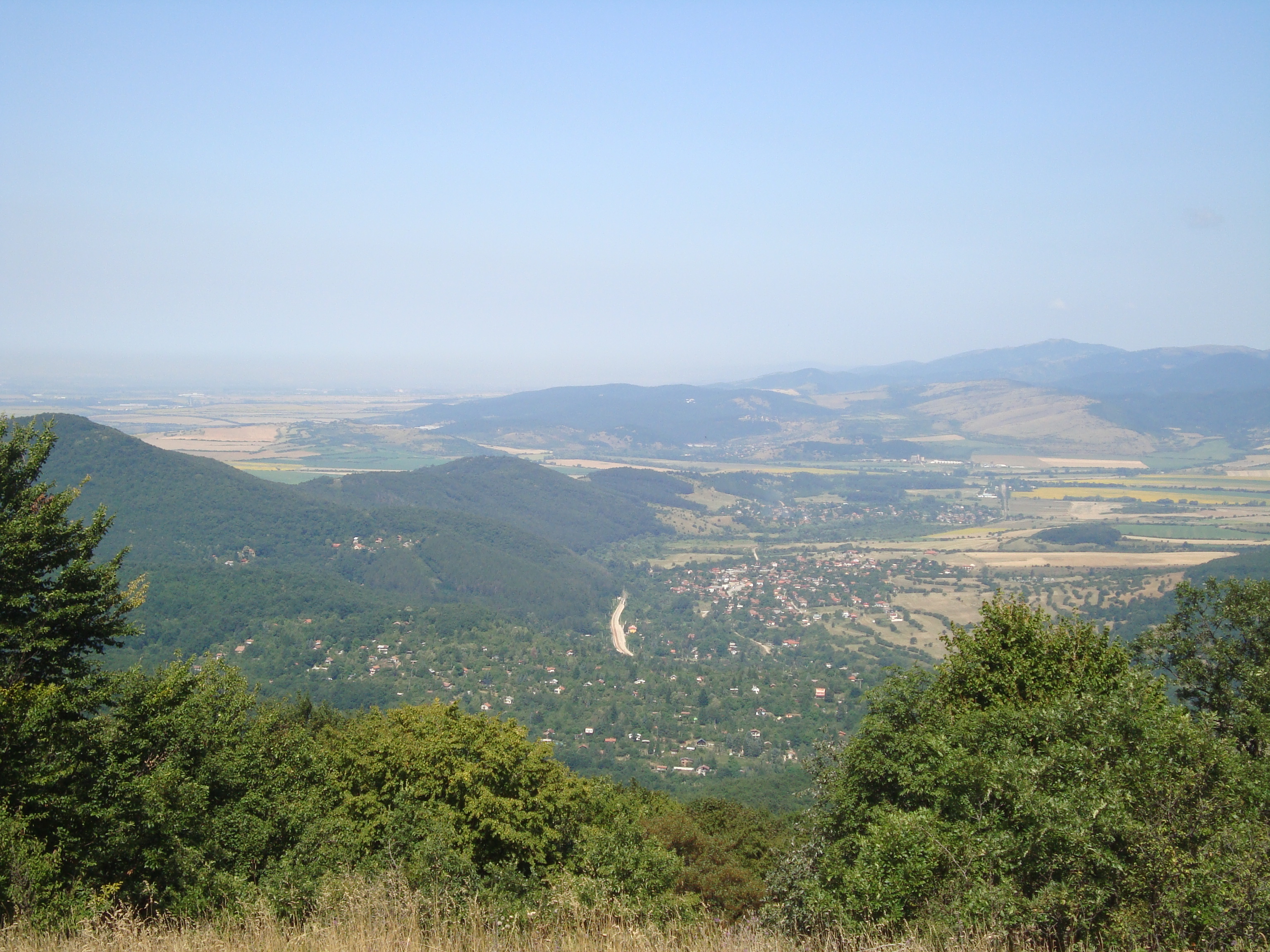
A view to the village of Makotsevo

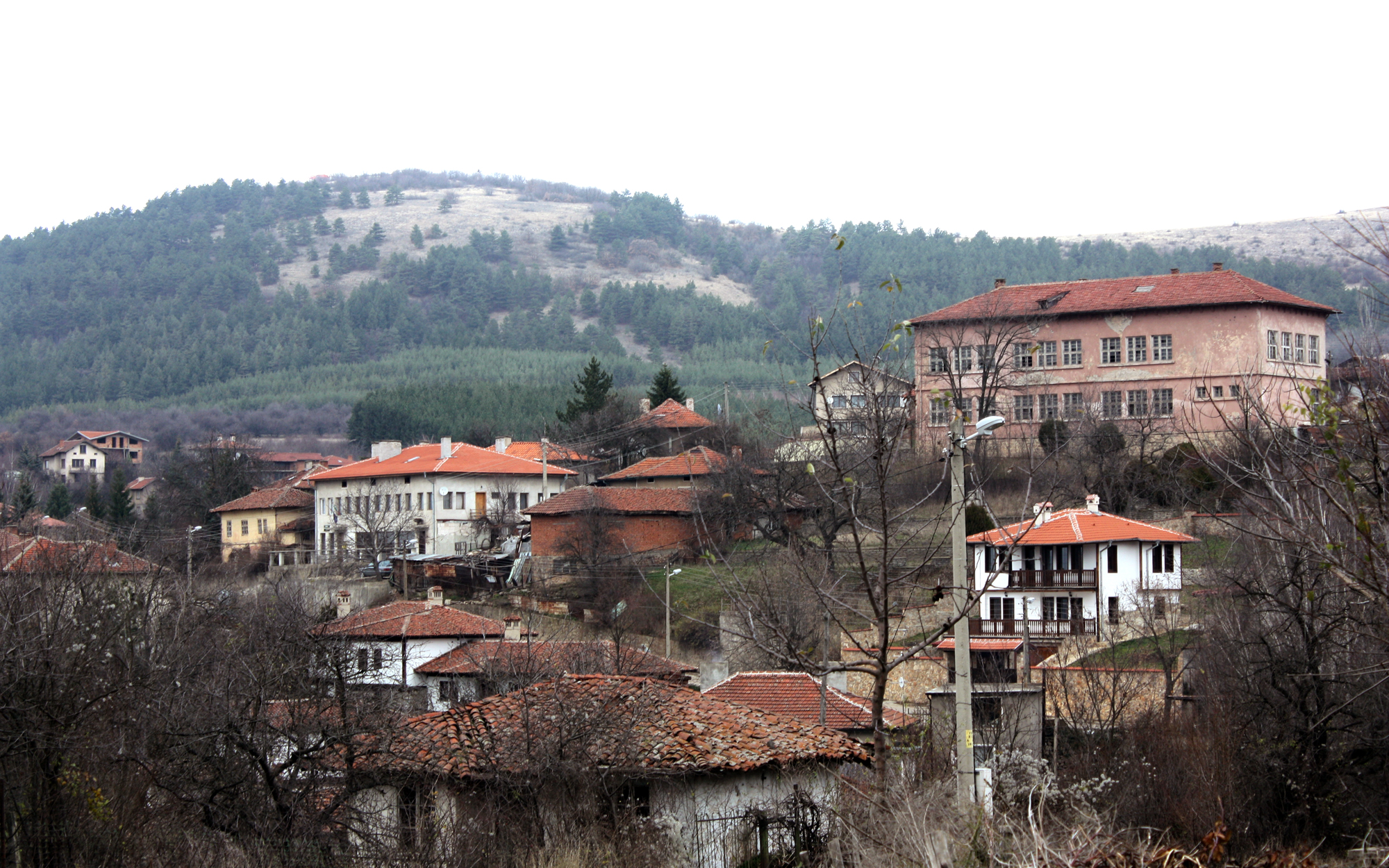
The village of Bailovo

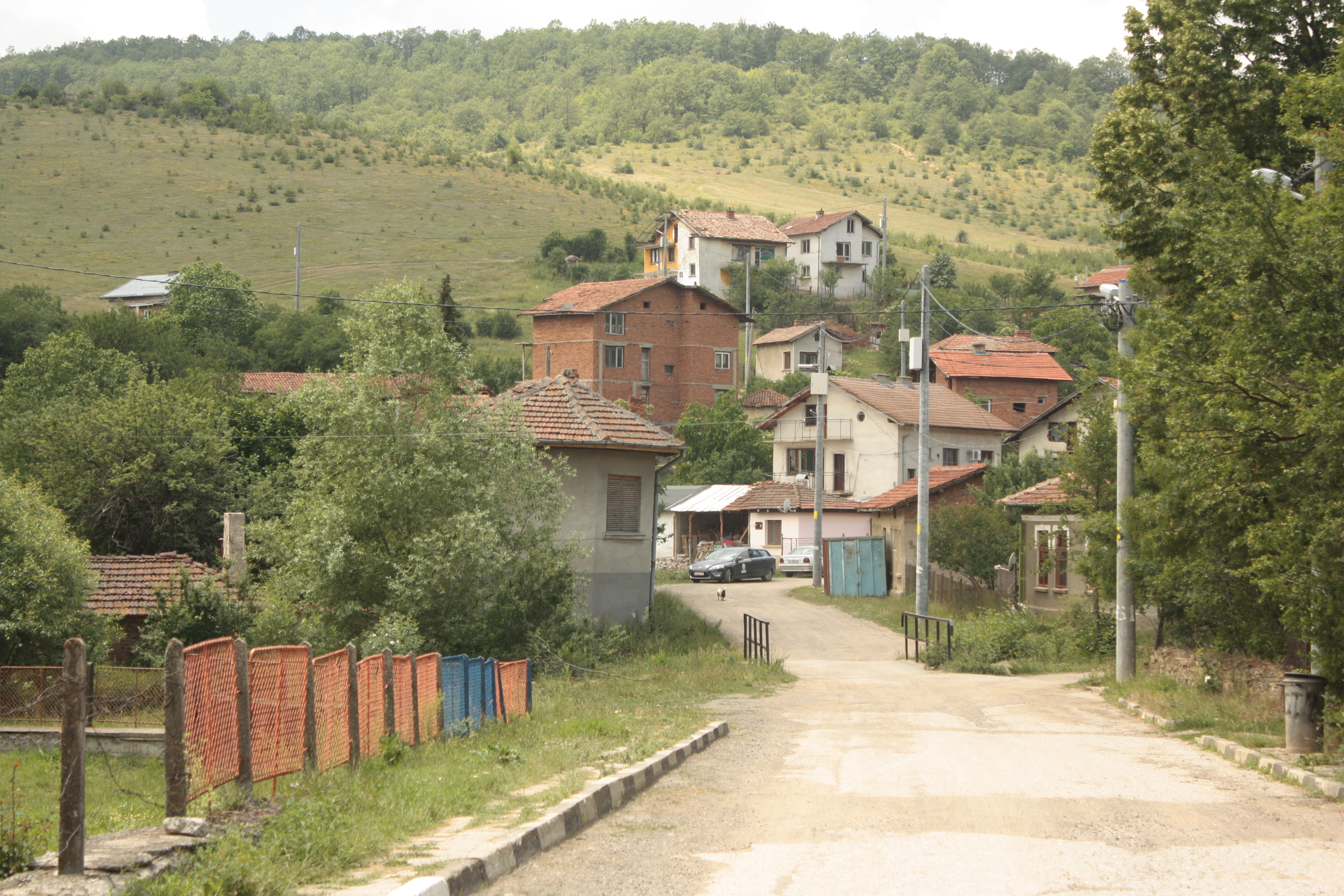
The village of Gorno Kamartsi
