= Gorno Kamartsi =

- Village
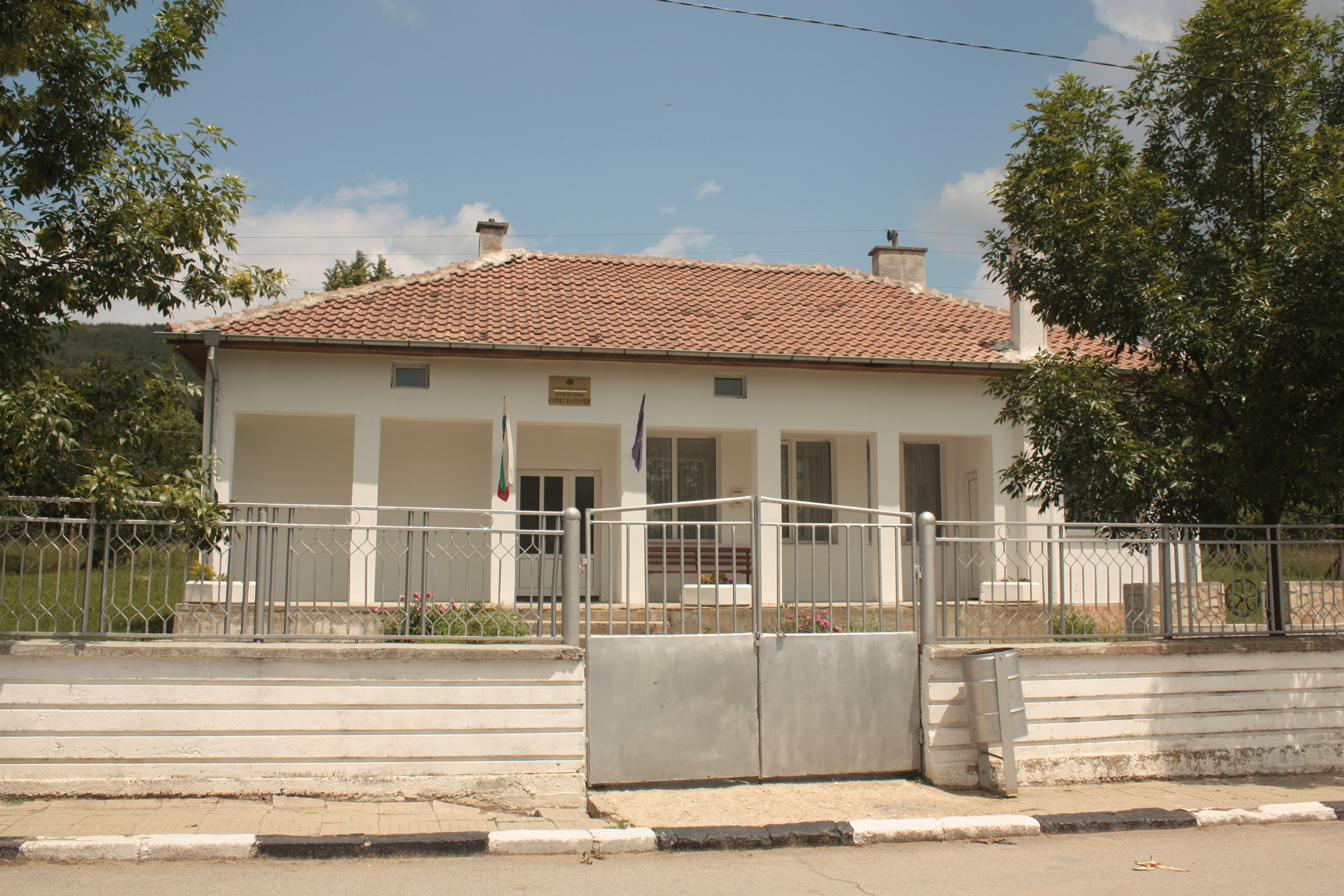

- Location within Bulgaria
- Coordinates: 42°45′22.63″N 23°49′28.84″E
- Country: Bulgaria
- Province: Sofia
- Municipality: Gorna Malina
- Elevation: 778 m (2,552 ft)

Population (2024)
  - Total: 212
- Time zone: UTC+2 (EET)
  - Summer (DST): UTC+3 (EEST)
- Postal code: 2138

Gorno Kamartsi (Bulgarian: Горно Камарци) is a village in Gorna Malina Municipality of Sofia Province, central western Bulgaria. As of 2024 it has 212 inhabitants.

== Geography ==
The village is situated at an altitude of 778 m in the northwestern reaches of the small Kamarska Valley, enclosed between the Balkan Mountains to the north and the Sredna Gora mountain range to the south. Gorno Kamartsi lies close to the southern entrance of two Balkan mountain passes, Vitinya and Arabakonak. It falls within the continental climatic zone.

It has a territory of 31.407 km^{2}. The closest settlements are the villages of Stargel to the east and Dolno Kamartsi to the southeast, both within the same valley, as well as Sarantsi to the west, in the neighbouring Saranska Valley.

Gorno Kamartsi is served by the local third class III-1001 road that links the nearby major highways — the Hemus motorway (A2) and the first class I-1 road Vidin–Sofia–Blagoevgrad–Kulata to the north, and the first class I-6 road Gyueshevo–Sofia–Karlovo–Burgas to the south.

== Culture ==
The local cultural center, known in Bulgarian as a chitalishte, is named after the revolutionary Hristo Botev.
