= Dolno Kamartsi =

- Village
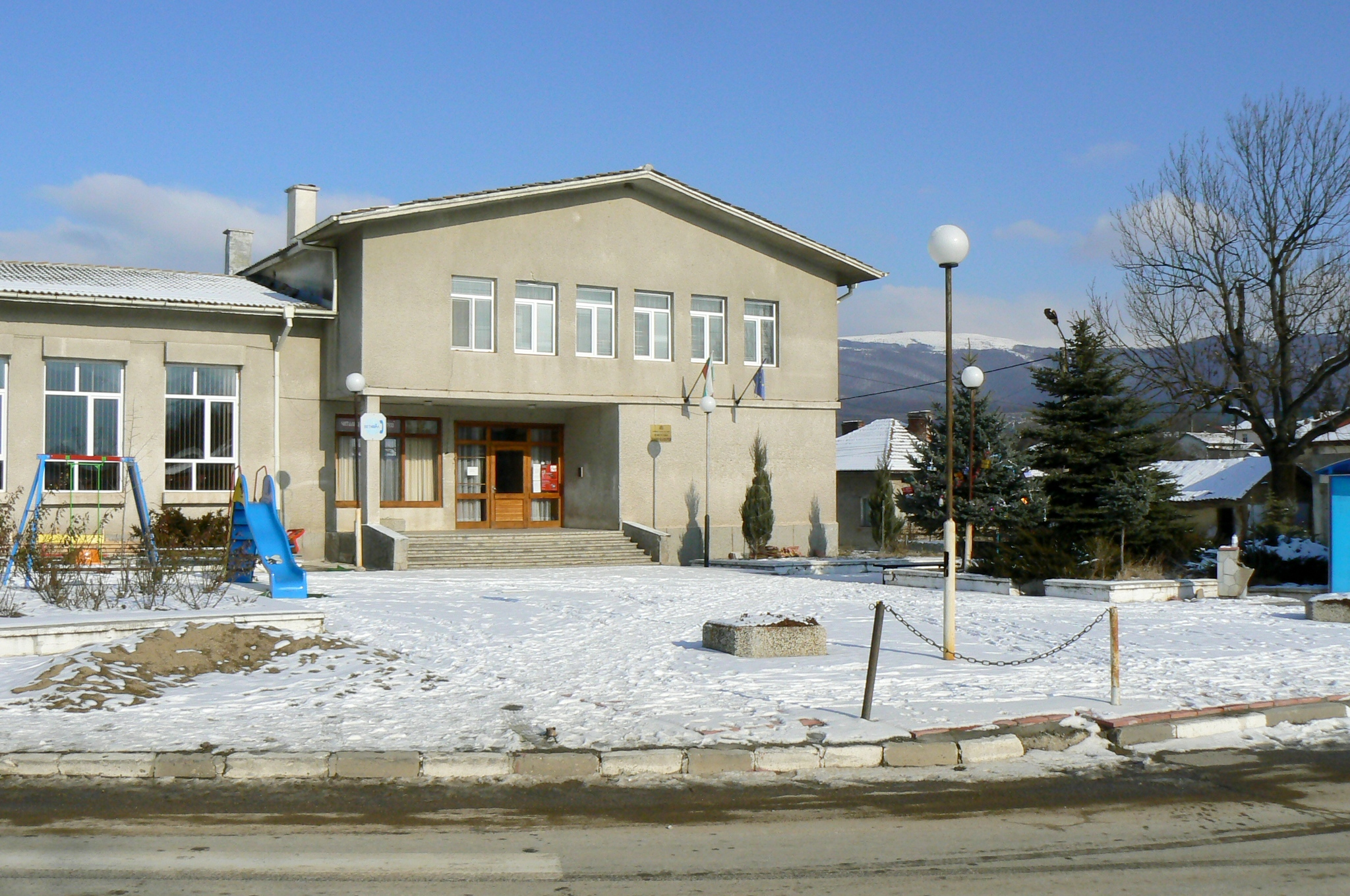

- Location within Bulgaria
- Coordinates: 42°42′49.35″N 23°51′27.95″E
- Country: Bulgaria
- Province: Sofia
- Municipality: Gorna Malina
- Elevation: 698 m (2,290 ft)

Population (2024)
  - Total: 407
- Time zone: UTC+2 (EET)
  - Summer (DST): UTC+3 (EEST)
- Postal code: 2137

Dolno Kamartsi (Bulgarian: Долно Камарци) is a village in Gorna Malina Municipality of Sofia Province, central western Bulgaria. As of 2024 it has 407 inhabitants.

== Geography ==
The village is situated at an altitude of 698 m in the southwestern reaches of the small Kamarska Valley, enclosed between the Balkan Mountains to the north and the Sredna Gora mountain range to the south. It falls within the continental climatic zone.

It has a territory of 32.375 km^{2}. The closest settlements include the villages of Stargel to the north and Gorno Kamartsi to the northwest, both within the same valley, as well as Sarantsi in the Saranska Valley to the west, and Bunovo in the Zlatitsa–Pirdop Valley to the east. The distance to the national capital Sofia is 44 km in western direction.

Dolno Kamartsi lies on the major first class I-6 road Gyueshevo–Sofia–Karlovo–Burgas. A local road branches off northward to Stargel. There is also a railway station on line No. 3 Iliyantsi (Sofia)–Karlovo–Sliven–Karnobat–Varna served by the Bulgarian State Railways.

== Economy ==
There are several small industrial enterprises, producing chemical products, metal construction and timber.

== Culture ==
The local cultural center, known in Bulgarian as a chitalishte, was founded in 1919 and is named after the revolutionary Hristo Botev.
