= Stargel =

- Village
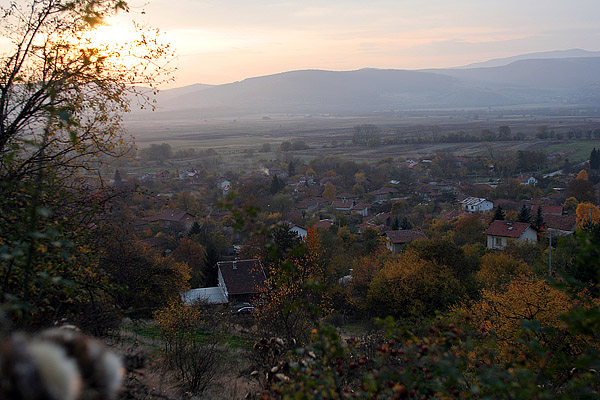

- Location within Bulgaria
- Coordinates: 42°44′50.06″N 23°52′14.19″E
- Country: Bulgaria
- Province: Sofia
- Municipality: Gorna Malina
- Elevation: 903 m (2,963 ft)

Population (2024)
  - Total: 232
- Time zone: UTC+2 (EET)
  - Summer (DST): UTC+3 (EEST)
- Postal code: 2135

Stargel (Bulgarian: Стъргел) is a village in Gorna Malina Municipality of Sofia Province, central western Bulgaria. As of 2024 it has 232 inhabitants.

== Geography ==
The village is situated at an altitude of 908 m in the northeastern part the small Kamarska Valley, enclosed between the Balkan Mountains to the north and the Sredna Gora mountain range to the south. It lies close to the southern entrance of two Balkan mountain passes, Vitinya and Arabakonak. It falls within the continental climatic zone.

Stargel has a territory of 39.519 km^{2}. The closest settlements are the villages of Gorno Kamartsi to the west and Dolno Kamartsi to the south, both within the same valley.

The village is served by two local roads that link it with the other two settlements in the valley, as well as with the important first class I-6 road Gyueshevo–Sofia–Karlovo–Burgas to the south.

== Culture ==
The local cultural center, known in Bulgarian as a chitalishte, was founded in 1922 and is named after the enlightener Hristo G. Danov.
