= Galabets =

Galabets may refer to several places:

- Galabets (tunnel), a railway tunnel in Bulgaria
- Galabets, Burgas Province, a village in Burgas Province, Bulgaria
- Galabets, Haskovo Province, a village in Haskovo Province, Bulgaria
