= Sofia Valley =

Valley in Bulgaria

- Valley
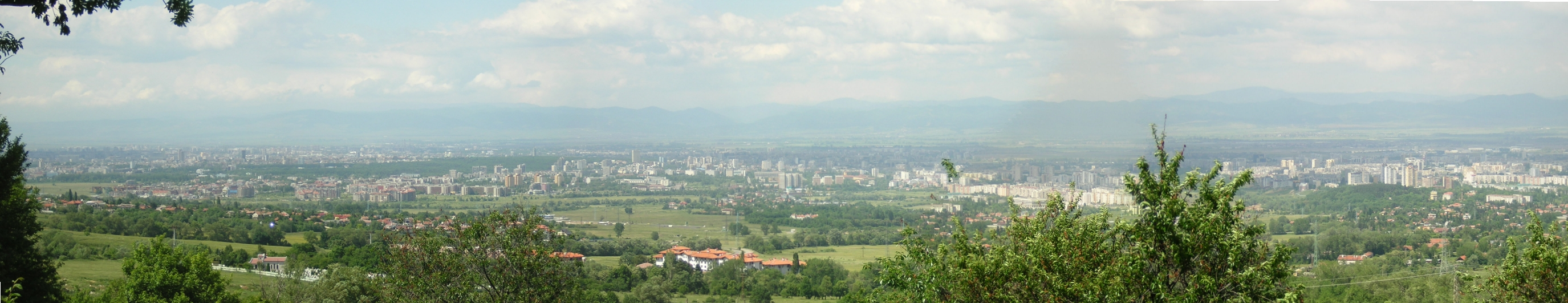
- View of Sofia valley from Vitosha
- Interactive map of Sofia Valley
- Coordinates: 42°47′0″N 23°16′0″E
- Location: Bulgaria

Area
  - Total: 1,180 km^{2} (460 sq mi)

Dimensions
  - Length: 75 km (47 mi)
  - Width: 20 km (12 mi)

The Sofia Valley (Bulgarian: Софийска котловина, romanized: Sofiyska kotlovina), or Sofia Field (Bulgarian: Софийско поле, romanized: Sofiysko pole), is situated in central western Bulgaria. It is the second of the succession of the eleven Sub-Balkan valleys in direction west–east and is the largest of them in area and population. It is named after the city of Sofia, the capital of Bulgaria. Strategically situated on major crossroads in the center of the Balkan Peninsula, the valley is an important national and international economic, transportation and cultural hub.

== Geography ==
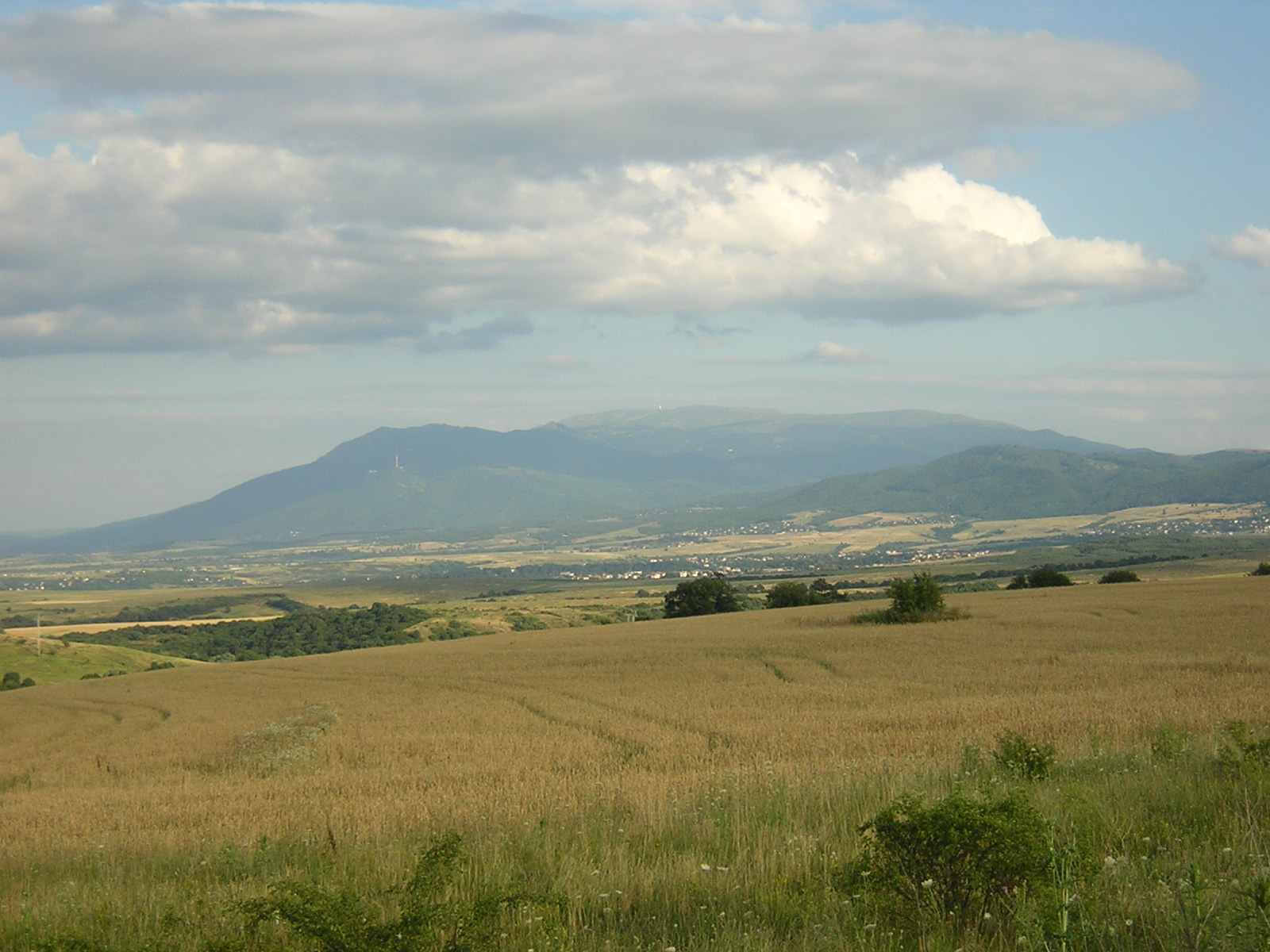
A view of the western part of the valley with Vitosha

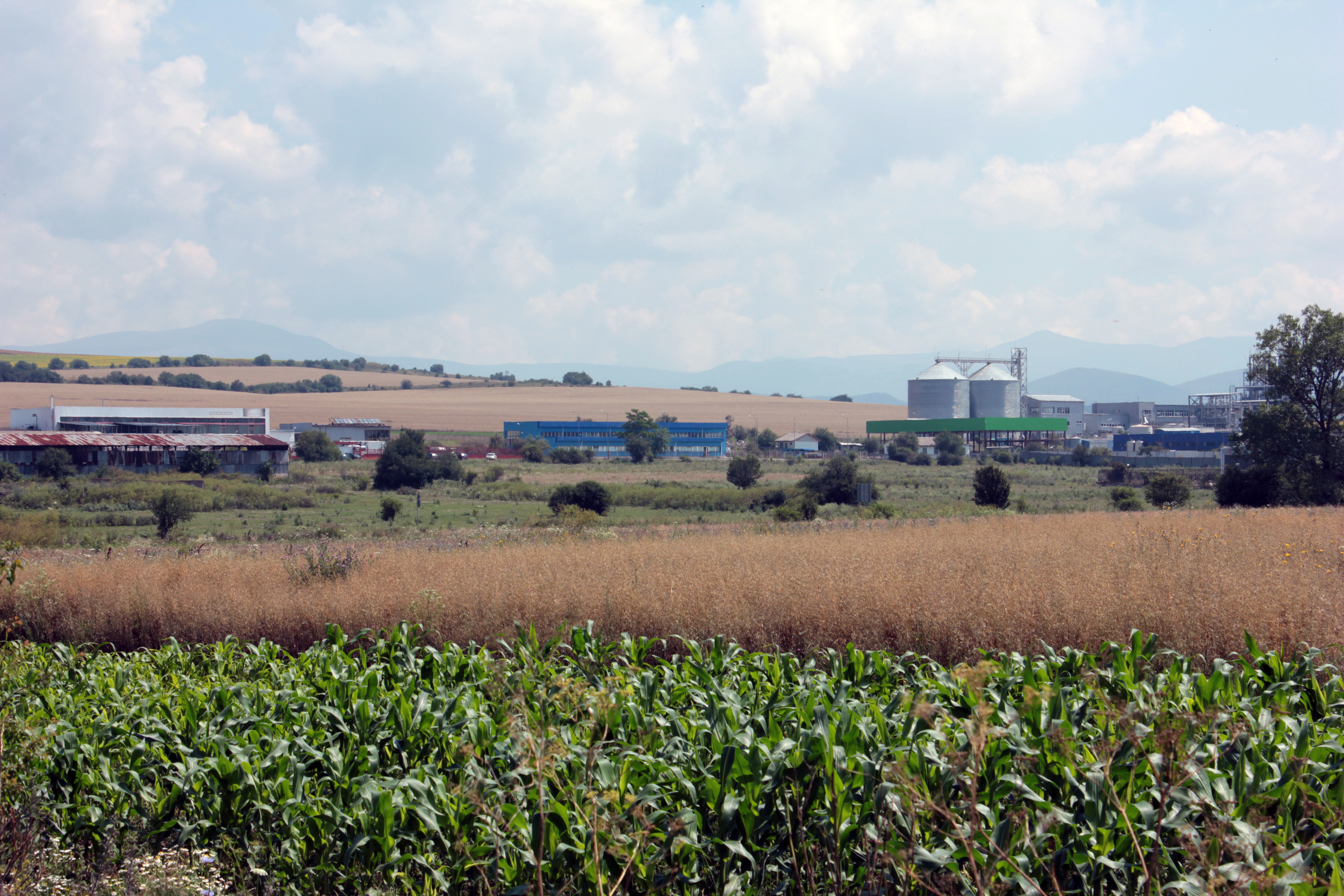
A view of the eastern part of the valley at Gorna Malina

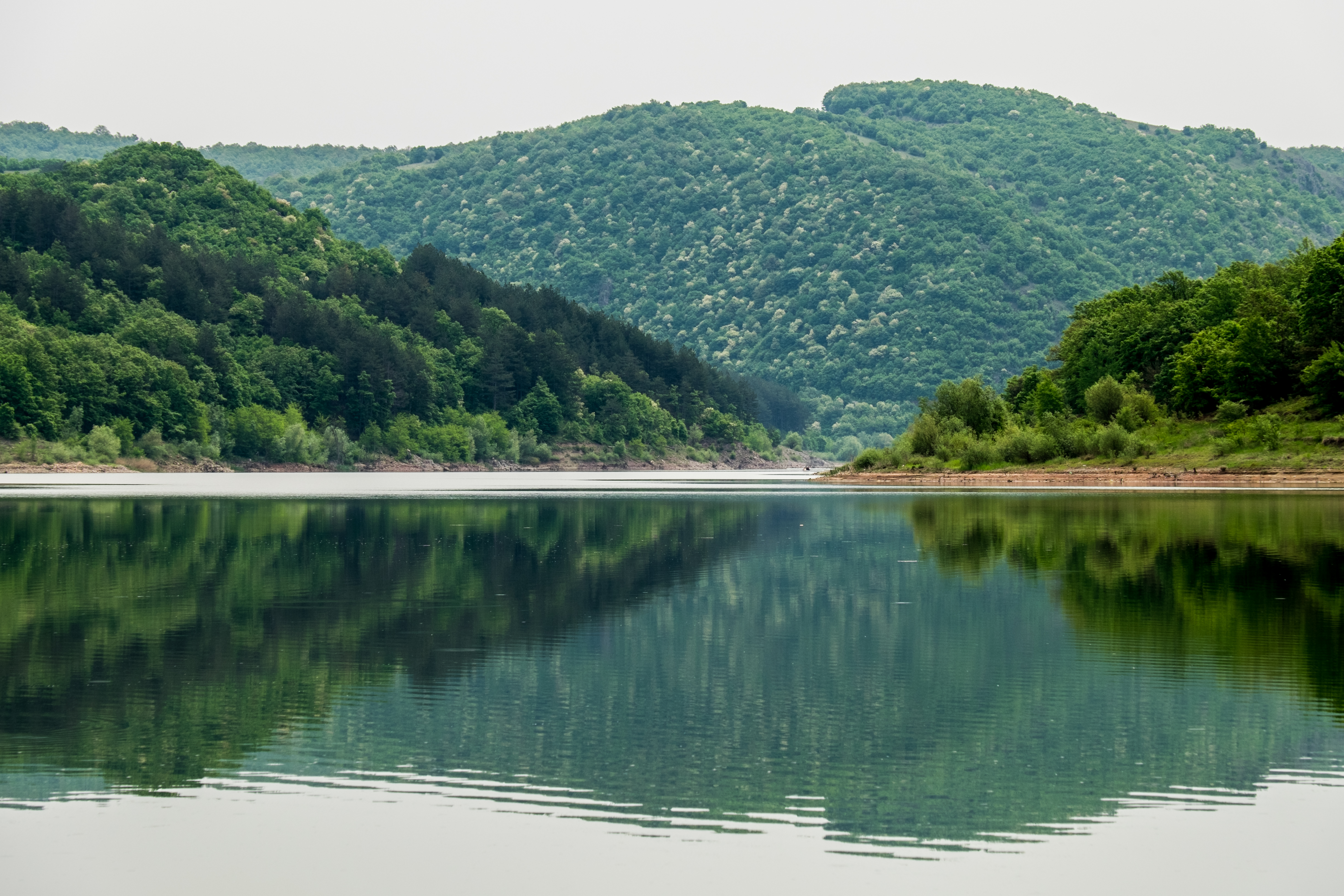
Ognyanovo Reservoir at the easternmost part of the valley

The valley is enclosed between the Chepan, Mala Planina, Sofia Mountain and Murgash divisions of the Balkan Mountains to the north–northeast, the mountain ranges of Viskyar, Lyulin and Vitosha to the southwest, the Lozen Mountain division of the Sredna Gora mountain range to the south and the Vakarel Mountain and Belitsa Ridge of Sredna Gora to the southeast. To the west the watershed between the rivers Gaberska and Slivnishka, as well as the Aldomirovtsi Heights, form the boundary with the Burel Valley, while to the east the low Negushevski Ridge separates it from the small Saranska Valley.

Within those boundaries the valley spans a territory of 1,180 km^{2}, making it the largest of the Sub-Balkan valleys. It reaches a length of 75 km in direction northwest–southeast, while the width varies between 5 and 20 km. The average altitude is 550 m. The valley has hilly foothills and a wide flat part, the Sofia Field, where there are several low elevations protruding from the lowlands, such as Lozenets, Reduta, Baba, etc. The foothills of the valley rise up to 700 m asl and are more pronounced west of the river Iskar.

The valley floor lies over Cenozoic pyroclastites and Pliocene sediments overlain by diluvial and alluvial fans. It is filled with Pliocene sands and clays overlain by thick fluvial deposits and is marshy in many places. The morphological formation of the Sofia Basin is related to the development of the Sofia graben structure, bounded to the north and south by faults. During the Pliocene and the Quaternary, it was subjected to differentiated negative movements, the course of the river Iskar was obstructed, and the entire valley was transformed into a large lake. The lake disappeared after the river later made its way through the Balkan Mountains via the Iskar Gorge and created its present riverbed. As a result of the lake's long existence, thick sediments reaching 200–800 m have accumulated on the bottom of the drained valley. The slopes flanking the valley from the north are composed of Paleozoic shales, as well as Triassic and Jurassic sandstones, limestones and conglomerates. The slopes to the south are mainly composed of Upper Cretaceous pyroclastites west of the Iskar and Triassic sandstones and conglomerates east of the river.

The Sofia Valley falls within the temperate continental climatic zone. The average annual temperature is 9–10 °C, with an average January temperature of around –2 °C and an average July temperature of around 20 °C. The mean annual rainfall is 550–560 mm. The valley is prone to frequent temperature inversions and Foehn winds.

It is drained by the river Iskar, which flows through the valley in direction south–north, as well as several of its tributaries, mostly left, including the Vitoshka Bistritsa, the Perlovska with its own tributaries the Boyanska reka and the Vladayska reka, the Kakach and the Blato, as well as the right tributary the Lesnovska reka. Due to the low rainfall and the flat topography, the river discharge is low. The Sofia Valley is rich in mineral springs, such as those at Knyazhevo, Gorna Banya, Pancharevo, Bankya, Sofia, etc. There are also many small lakes and marshes.

== Settlements and transport ==
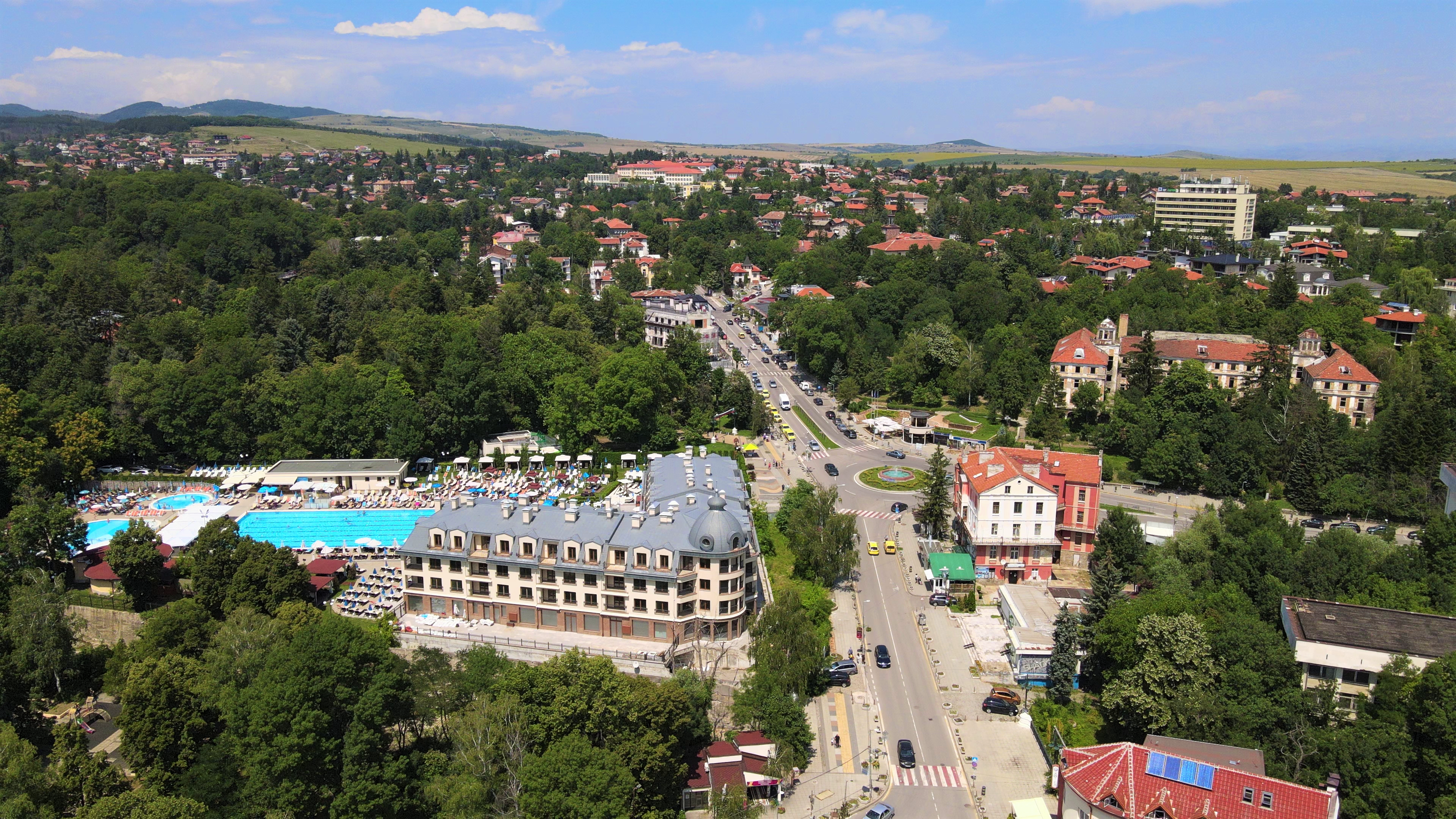
A view of the town of Bankya

Administratively, the valley is part of Sofia and Sofia City Provinces. One of the most densely populated regions in Bulgaria, the valley includes the national capital Sofia, the towns of Slivnitsa, Kostinbrod, Bozhurishte, Bankya and Novi Iskar to the west, Elin Pelin and Buhovo to the east, as well as numerous villages.

Strategically located in the center of the Balkan Peninsula, the Sofia Valley is a major national and international transportation hub, as well as the center of the Bulgarian road, railway and airway networks. It is the starting point of the Hemus motorway leading northeast to Varna, the Trakiya motorway, leading southeast to Burgas, the Struma motorway heading southwest to Greece, and the Europe motorway northwest to Serbia.

The valley is served by numerous roads from the national network. From northeast to southwest between the villages of Eleshnitsa and Vladaya it is traversed by a 48.9 km stretch of the first class I-1 road Vidin–Sofia–Blagoevgrad–Kulata. From west to east between Vladaya and Gorna Malina runs a 55.4 km section of the first class I-6 road Gyueshevo–Sofia–Karlovo–Burgas. From the northwest to the southeast between Dragoman and Novi Han is an 83.8 km section of the first class I-8 road Kalotina–Sofia–Plovdiv–Kapitan Andreevo.

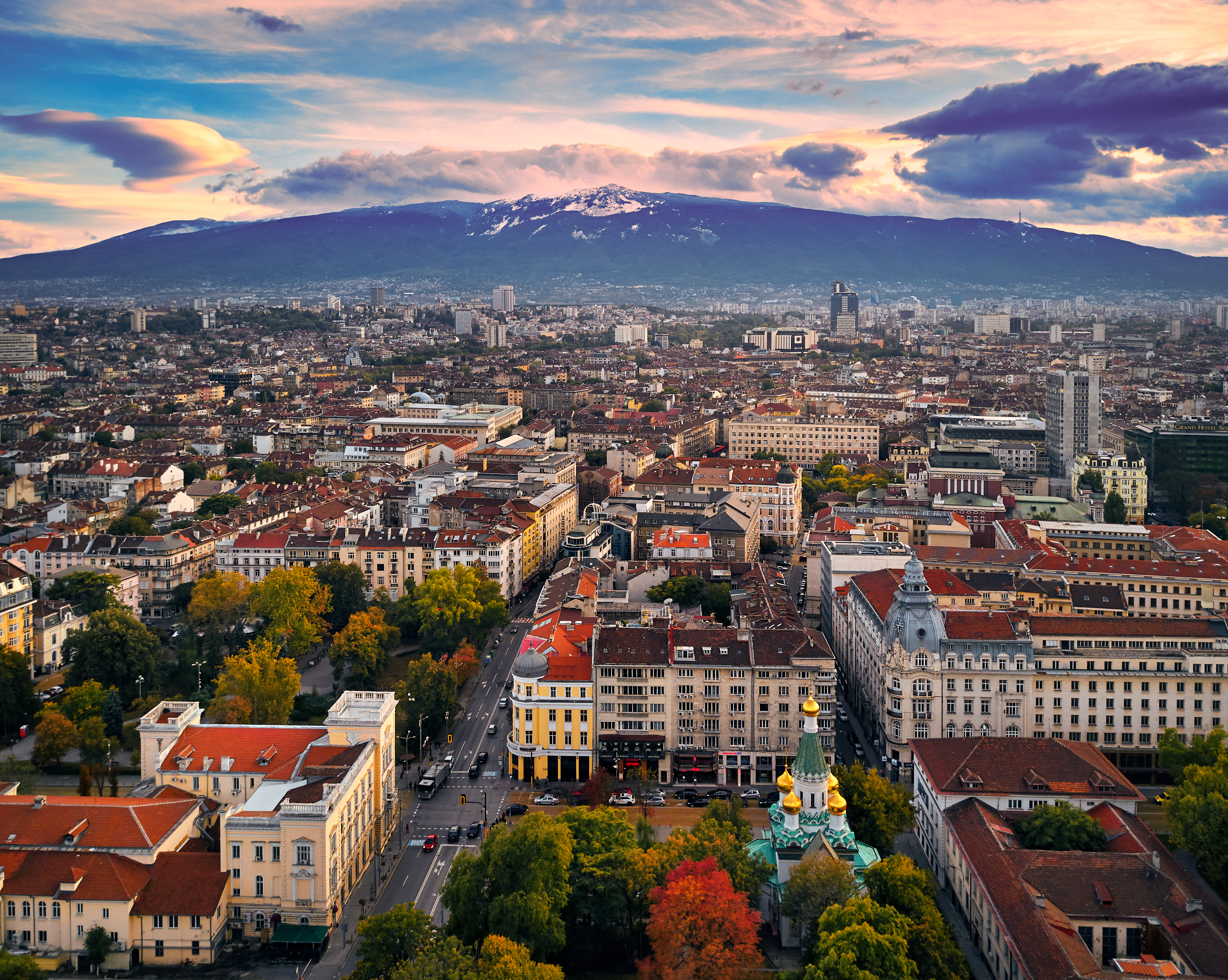
A view of Sofia with Vitosha on the background

The capital is encircled by the Sofia Ring Road (II-18). In the northern part of the valley near Novi Iskar passes a 7.4 km section of the second class II-16 road Rebarkovo–Svoge–Novi Iskar. Again in the north, between Voluyak and Dragovishtitsa, runs a 12.5 km stretch of the second class II-81 road Sofia–Montana–Lom. Four third class roads also traverse the valley — a 17.4 km section of III-105 Eleshnitsa–Elin Pelin– Novi Han in the east, an 18.6 km stretch of III-638 Breznik–Bozhurishte in the south, an 8 km stretch of III-802 Sofia–Bankya–Pernik in the south, and a 23.6 km section of III-811 Beledie Han–Slivnitsa–Breznik in the northwest.

The valley is also the main hub of the Bulgarian State Railways' network. It is traversed by railway line No. 1 Kalotina–Sofia–Plovdiv–Kapitan Andreevo from northwest to southeast, and is the starting point of lines No. 2 Sofia–Gorna Oryahovitsa–Varna heading north, No. 3 Sofia–Karlovo–Sliven–Karnobat–Varna heading east, and No. 5 Sofia–Blagoevgrad–Kulata heading south.

In the eastern part of the valley is located the Vasil Levski Sofia Airport, the largest and busiest one in the country, serving almost 8 million passengers, which also houses the Vrazhdebna Air Base of the Bulgarian Air Force. To the north is situated the former Dobroslavtsi Air Base. Further east is the private Lesnovo Airfield and another smaller private airfield is located near Slivnitsa to the west.

== Economy and tourism ==
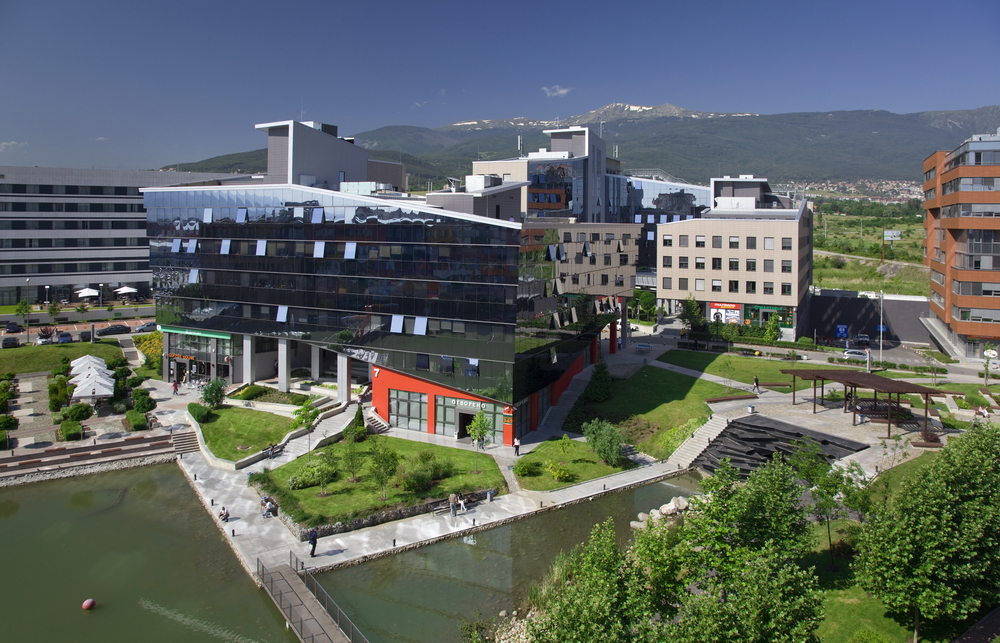
Business Park Sofia is one of the many office centers in the capital

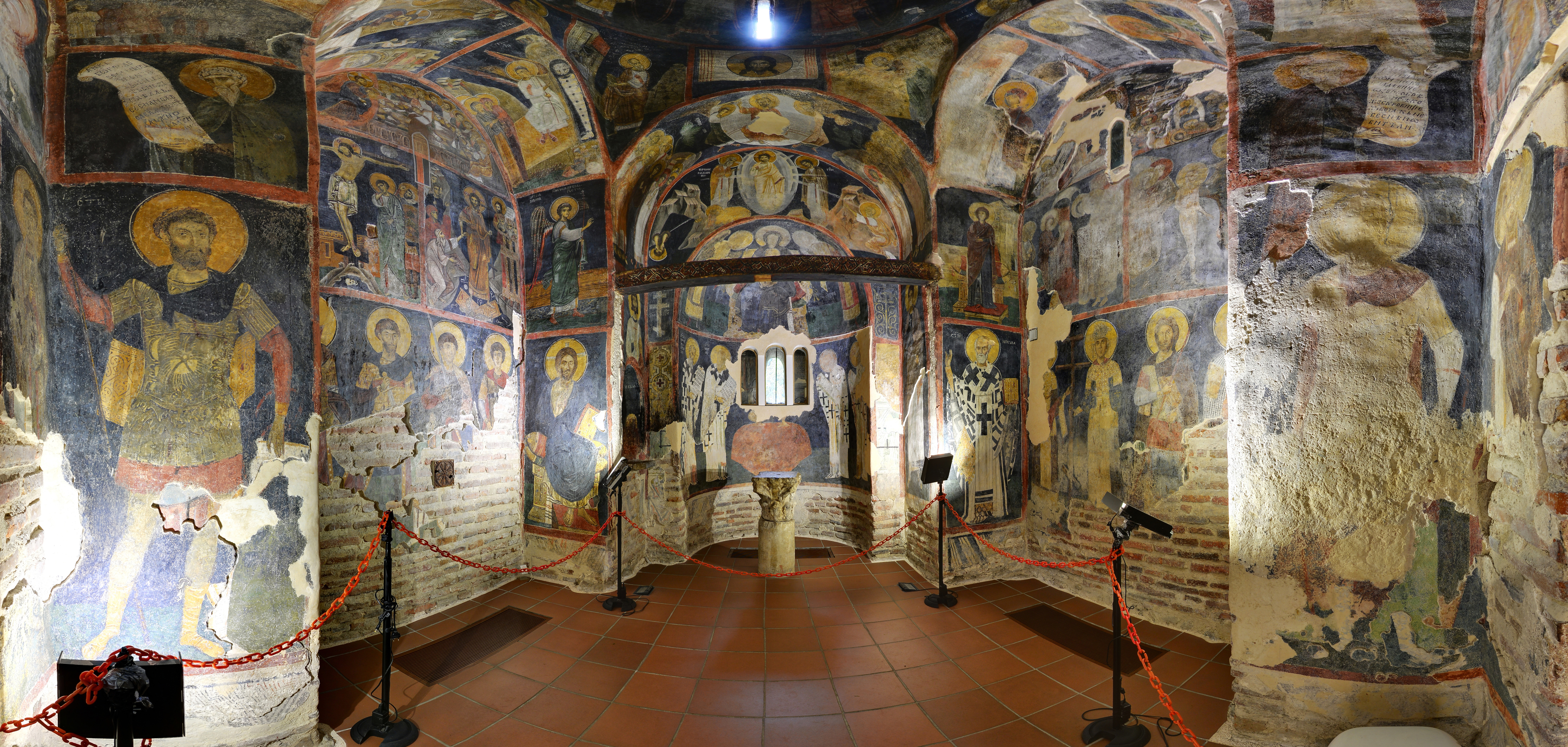
Frescoes in the Boyana Church, a UNESCO World Heritage Site

The valley is the economic center of Bulgaria with the city of Sofia accounting for 43% of the national GDP as of 2023, or 40.4 billion euro. The economy is dominated by the services with 84% of the added value and manufacturing with 15%. The most important services sectors include trade with 26.3% of the total economic activity, information and communication technology (24.9%), professional activities and research (8.9%), transport and logistics (7%), administration (5.5%). The IT sector is particularly vibrant with many national, international and start-up companies, employing 50,000 professionals, 30% of them involved in programming, that contribute for 14% of Sofia's exports. There is also a strong high value-added industry with focus on electrical equipment, precision mechanics, metal transformation, machine-building, pharmaceuticals, food processing. There are 16 industrial and logistics parks in Sofia, Bozhurishte, Kostinbrod and Elin Pelin. Although the valley is fertile and mostly covered with farmlands outside the urban and industrial areas, agriculture accounts for less than 1% of the local economy. The most important crops include wheat, sunflower, orchards, fruits and vegetables.

Historically, the economy has been subjected to significant shifts and changes, following the global economic trends. The relative importance of agriculture, mining and manufacturing has declined in favour of the tertiary sector. Mining has all but disappeared. The iron ore deposit at Kremikovtsi in the northern part of the valley was decommissioned in the 1990s, while the exploitation of the lignite coal deposits has also been discontinued. The largest manufacturing plant, the Kremikovtsi Steel Factory closed in 2009. At the same time, there has been consistent significant growth of office spaces, business parks, logistics centers and new industrial zones, such as the Sofia–Bozhurishte Industrial Park.

The Sofia Valley has an important cultural and architectural heritage. There are a number of monasteries in the lowlands or the mountain slopes facing the valley, mostly founded in the 13–14th centuries during the Second Bulgarian Empire, such as Dragalevtsi Monastery, Kremikovtsi Monastery, Lozen Monastery, Eleshnitsa Monastery and others. On the outskirts of Sofia is located the Boyana Church, declared a UNESCO World Heritage Site in recognition of its mid-13th century frescos, an important monument of medieval Bulgarian art. Much of the architectural heritage, museums, galleries and tourist sites are concentrated in the city of Sofia, which counts for nine of the 100 Tourist Sites of Bulgaria. Major landmarks include the early medieval Church of Saint George and Church of Saint Sophia, both important sites of early Christian art and architecture, the Saint Alexander Nevsky Cathedral, the Royal Palace, the National Assembly Building, the Sofia University Building, the Largo and many others. Many of Bulgaria's major museums are also located there, among them the National Historical Museum, National Archaeological Museum, National Museum of Military History, National Museum of Natural History, National Art Gallery, National Gallery for Foreign Art, etc.

== Sources ==
- Георгиев (Georgiev), Владимир (Vladimir) (1988). Енциклопедия България. Том VI. С-Ти [Encyclopaedia Bulgaria. Volume VI. S-Ti] (in Bulgarian). и колектив. София (Sofia): Издателство на БАН (Bulgarian Academy of Sciences Press).
- Мичев (Michev), Николай (Nikolay); Михайлов (Mihaylov), Цветко (Tsvetko); Вапцаров (Vaptsarov), Иван (Ivan); Кираджиев (Kiradzhiev), Светлин (Svetlin) (1980). Географски речник на България [Geographic Dictionary of Bulgaria] (in Bulgarian). София (Sofia): Наука и култура (Nauka i kultura).
- Дончев (Donchev), Дончо (Doncho); Каракашев (Karakashev), Христо (Hristo) (2004). Теми по физическа и социално-икономическа география на България (Topics on Physical and Social-Economic Geography of Bulgaria) (in Bulgarian). София (Sofia): Ciela. ISBN 954-649-717-7.
