= Kamarska Valley =

Valley in Bulgaria

- Valley
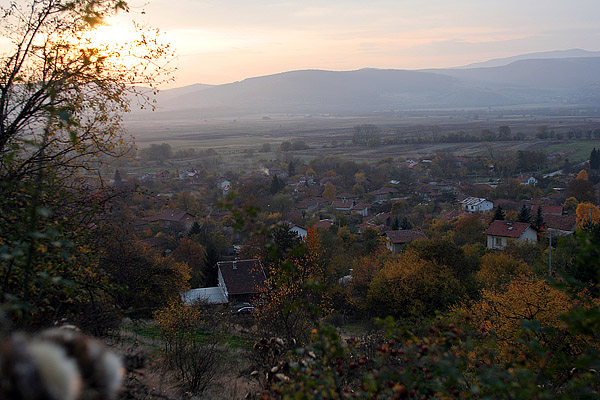
- The valley at the village of Stargel
- Interactive map of Kamarska Valley
- Coordinates: 42°44′11.76″N 23°51′11.52″E
- Location: Bulgaria

Area
  - Total: 20 km^{2} (7.7 sq mi)

Dimensions
  - Length: 5 km (3.1 mi)
  - Width: 5 km (3.1 mi)

Kamarska Valley (Bulgarian: Камарска котловина) is situated in central western Bulgaria and is the fourth of the eleven Sub-Balkan valleys in direction west–east, and is also the smallest and the highest one among them.

The valley is enclosed between the Murgash and Etropole divisions of the Balkan Mountains to the north and the Sredna Gora mountain range to the south. To the west the Oporski ridge separates it from the Saranska Valley and to the east the Galabets ridge (925 m) separates it from the Zlatitsa–Pirdop Valley.

The valley spans a territory of 20 km^{2}. It is roughly circular in shape, measuring between 3 and 4 km. The average altitude is 700–800 m and is inclined in southern direction. The valley's foundation is filled with alluvial fans and in the southern reaches it is partly swampy. The northern slopes of Kamarska Valley on the Balkan Mountains are generally deforested and heavily eroded, while the southern slopes on Sredna Gora are covered with beech and hornbeam forests. There are meadows and pastures.

The valley is located in Sofia Province, on the territory of Gorna Malina Municipality. There are three villages along its periphery — Gorno Kamartsi to the northwest, Stargel to the northeast and Dolno Kamartsi to the south. From northwest to southeast the valley is traversed by a 4 km stretch of the first class I-6 road Gyueshevo–Sofia–Karlovo–Burgas. A small section of railway line No. 3 Iliyantsi (Sofia)–Karlovo–Sliven–Karnobat–Varna served by the Bulgarian State Railways crosses the southernmost reaches of the valley.

== Sources ==
- Мичев (Michev), Николай (Nikolay); Михайлов (Mihaylov), Цветко (Tsvetko); Вапцаров (Vaptsarov), Иван (Ivan); Кираджиев (Kiradzhiev), Светлин (Svetlin) (1980). Географски речник на България [Geographic Dictionary of Bulgaria] (in Bulgarian). София (Sofia): Наука и култура (Nauka i kultura).
- Дончев (Donchev), Дончо (Doncho); Каракашев (Karakashev), Христо (Hristo) (2004). Теми по физическа и социално-икономическа география на България (Topics on Physical and Social-Economic Geography of Bulgaria) (in Bulgarian). София (Sofia): Ciela. ISBN 954-649-717-7.
