= Aprilovo =

Village in Bulgaria

Aprilovo Априлово
- Village
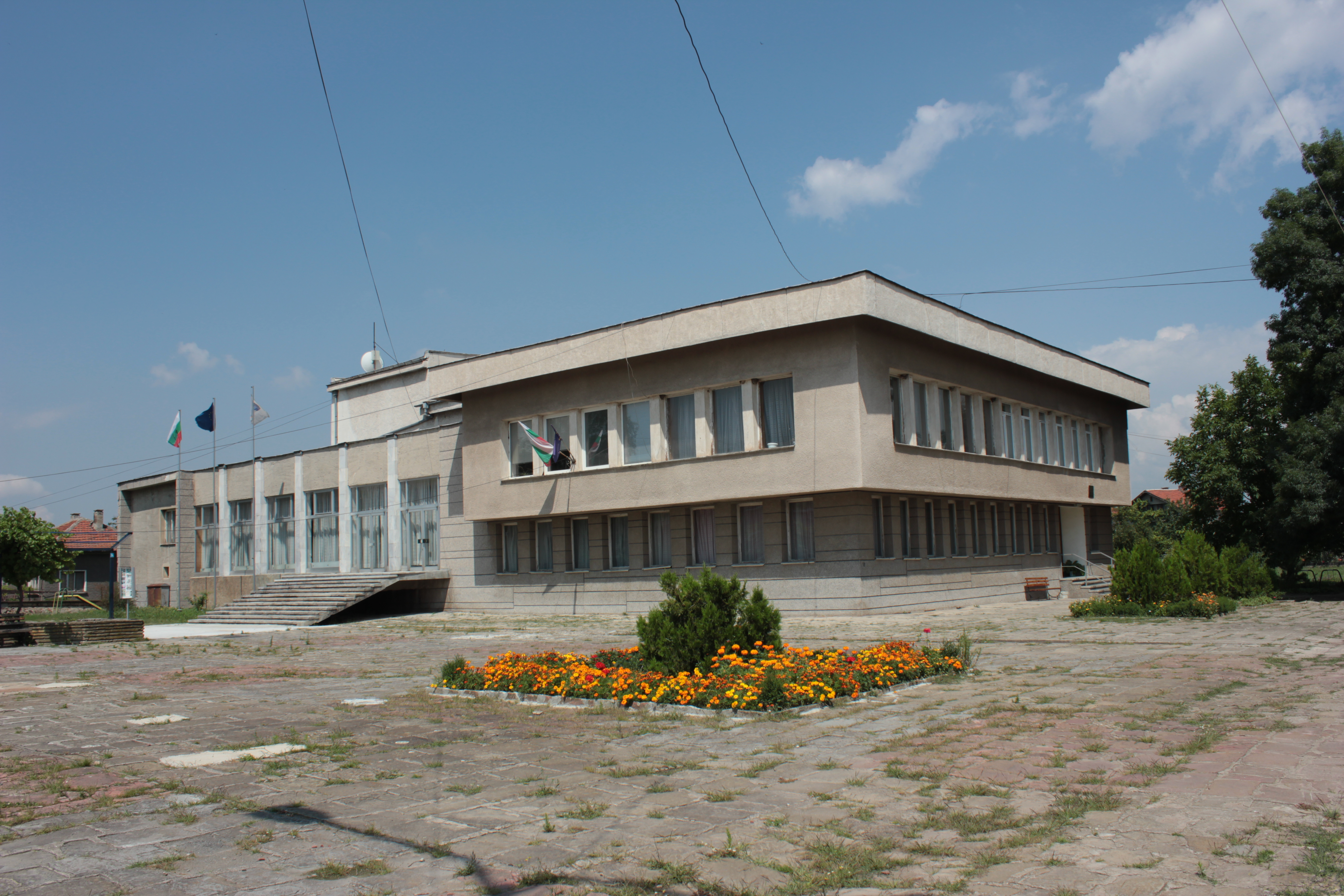
- Aprilovo town hall

- Location within Bulgaria
- Coordinates: 42°40′08″N 23°41′03″E
- Country: Bulgaria
- Oblast: Sofia
- Municipality: Gorna Malina Municipality

Government
  - Mayor (Municipal): Angel Zhilanov (Ind.)
  - Mayor (Town Hall): Atanas Vladov

Area
  - Total: 12.05 km^{2} (4.65 sq mi)
- Elevation: 559 m (1,834 ft)

Population (2024)
  - Total: 1,177
  - Density: 97.68/km^{2} (253.0/sq mi)
- Postal code: 2222
- Area code: 07159
- Vehicle registration: CO

Aprilovo (Bulgarian: Априлово) is a village in Gorna Malina Municipality, Sofia Province, western Bulgaria.
