= I-6 road (Bulgaria) =

Road in Bulgaria

Republic Road I-6
- Републикански път I-6
- I-6 road highlighted in orange

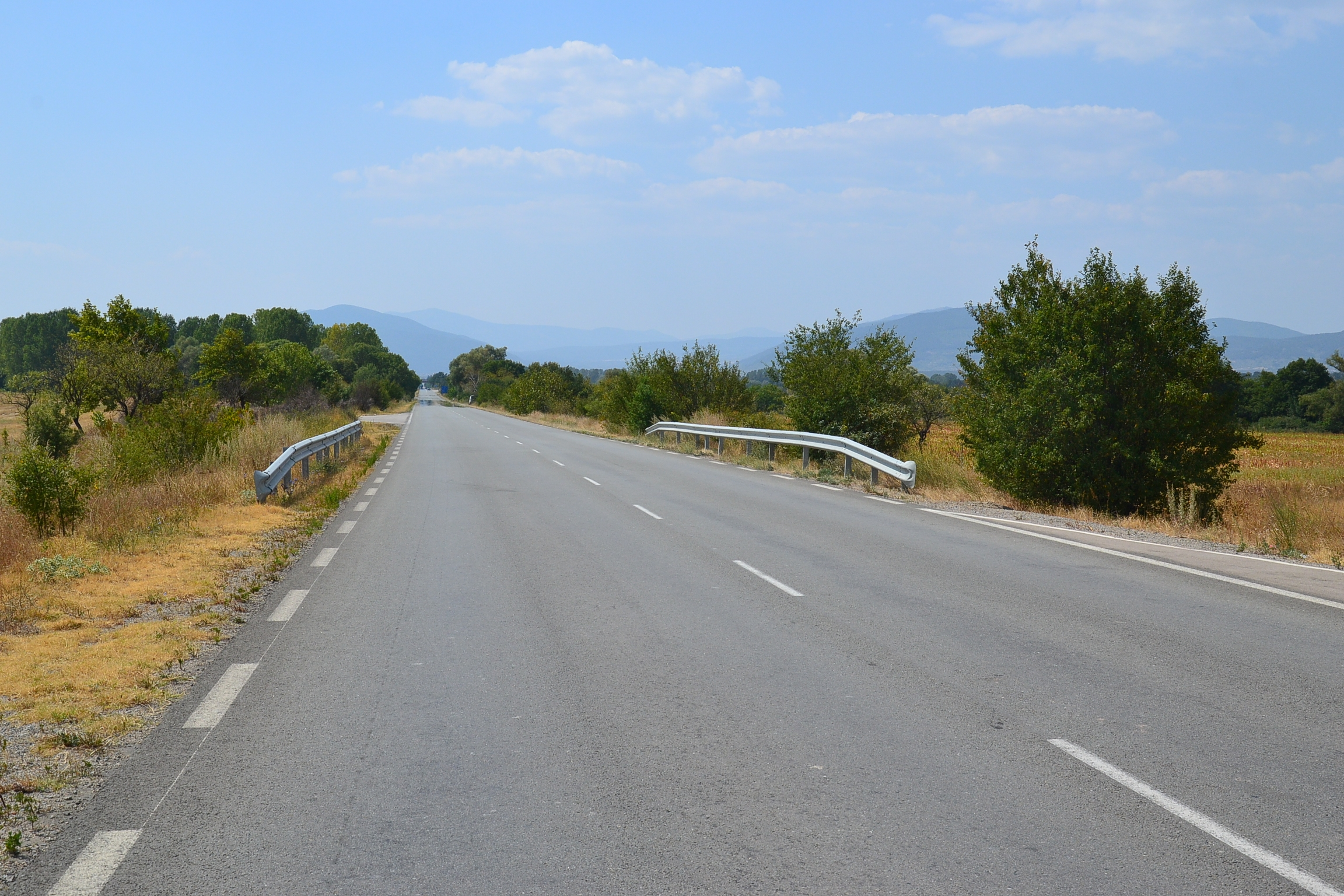

Route information
- Length: 508.5 km (316.0 mi)

Major junctions
- From: Gyueshevo; (North Macedonia)
- To: Burgas

Location
- Country: Bulgaria
- Major cities: Kyustendil, Pernik, Sofia, Pirdop, Sopot, Karlovo, Kazanlak, Sliven, Karnobat, Aytos, Burgas

Highway system
- Highways in Bulgaria

Republican Road I-6 (Bulgarian: Републикански път I-6) is a first class road in Bulgaria. It runs from Gyueshevo at the border with North Macedonia to Burgas on the Black Sea coast. With a total length of 508.5 km (316.0 mi), I-6 road is the longest road in Bulgaria. It is part of the European route E871 in the section Gyueshevo–Pernik and of the E773 in the stretch between the Petolachkata junction near Strazhitsa and Burgas. The road passes through nine of the 28 provinces of Bulgaria: Kyustendil, Pernik, Sofia City, Sofia, Plovdiv, Stara Zagora, Sliven, Yambol and Burgas.

== Description ==
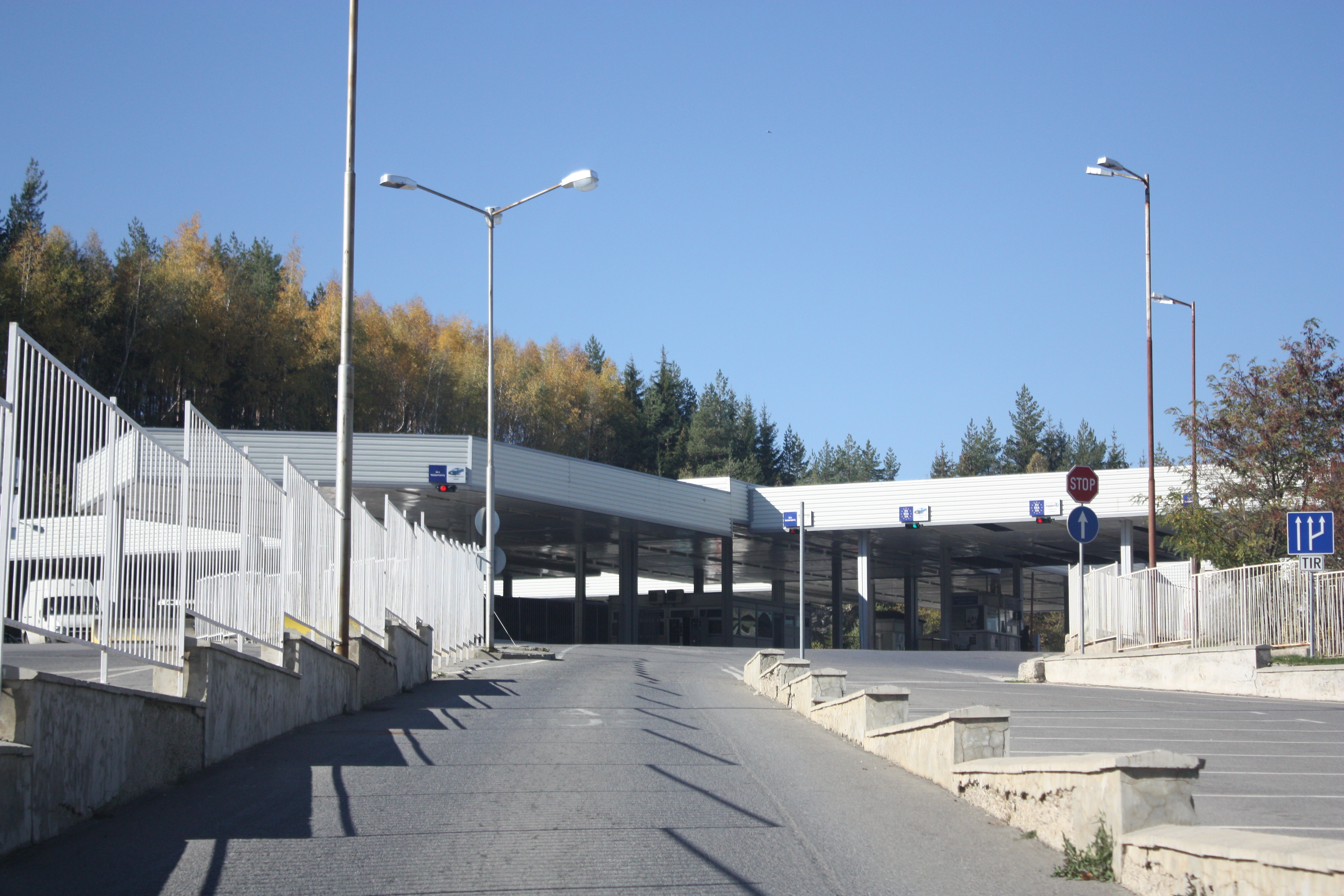
Gyueshevo border crossing at the beginning of the road

First class road I-6 starts at the Gyueshevo border crossing on the border with North Macedonia and heads east through Kyustendil Province. It descends into the Kamenitsa Valley, passes through the villages of Kamenichka Skakavitsa, Ranentsi and Garlyano, overcomes the saddle between the mountain ranges of Lisets and Osogovo at the village of Vratsa and descends into the Kyustendil Valley. There, the road turns northeast, passes through the village of Zhilentsi, bypasses the city of Kyustendil from the north, turns northeast, crosses the river Struma at the village of Yabalkovo, ascends the southern slopes of Konyavska Planina via the village of Tsarvenyano, crosses its ridge and enters Pernik Province.

There, the I-6 descends the northern slopes of the mountain range, passes through the village of Dragomirovo and enters the Radomir Valley at the village of Izvor. It passes through the center of the town of Radomir, bypasses the mountain range of Golo Bardo from the northwest, enters the Pernik Valley and reaches the center of the city Pernik. Between Radomir and Pernik, road I-6 runs as a four-lane dual carriageway road. In the eastern part of the city, it connects with first class I-1 road, enters Sofia City Province and for the next 47 km the two roads are duplicated.

At the village of Vladaya the road crosses the Vladaya Pass between Vitosha and Lyulin and enters the Sofia Valley at the Knyazhevo neighbourhood of the capital Sofia. Then for 19.6 km, the road coincides with the southern arc of the Sofia Ring Road and is a several-lane dial carriageway. It crosses the river Iskar, turns north and reaches the starting point of the Trakia motorway. From there to the starting kilometer of the Hemus motorway, still continuing north as part of the Sofia Ring Road, the I-6 is also duplicated with the first class I-8 road for 8.7 km. It then turns east, passes through the village of Dolni Bogrov and enters Sofia Province. In this section the road passes successively through three Sub-Balkan valleys between the Balkan Mountains to the north and Sredna Gora to the south — Saranska, Kamarska and Zlatitsa–Pirdop. In that section the road passes through the villages of Grigorevo, Sarantsi, Dolno Kamartsi and Chelopech, the towns of Zlatitsa and Pirdop and the village of Anton, climbs the transverse ridge of Koznitsa and enters Plovdiv Province.

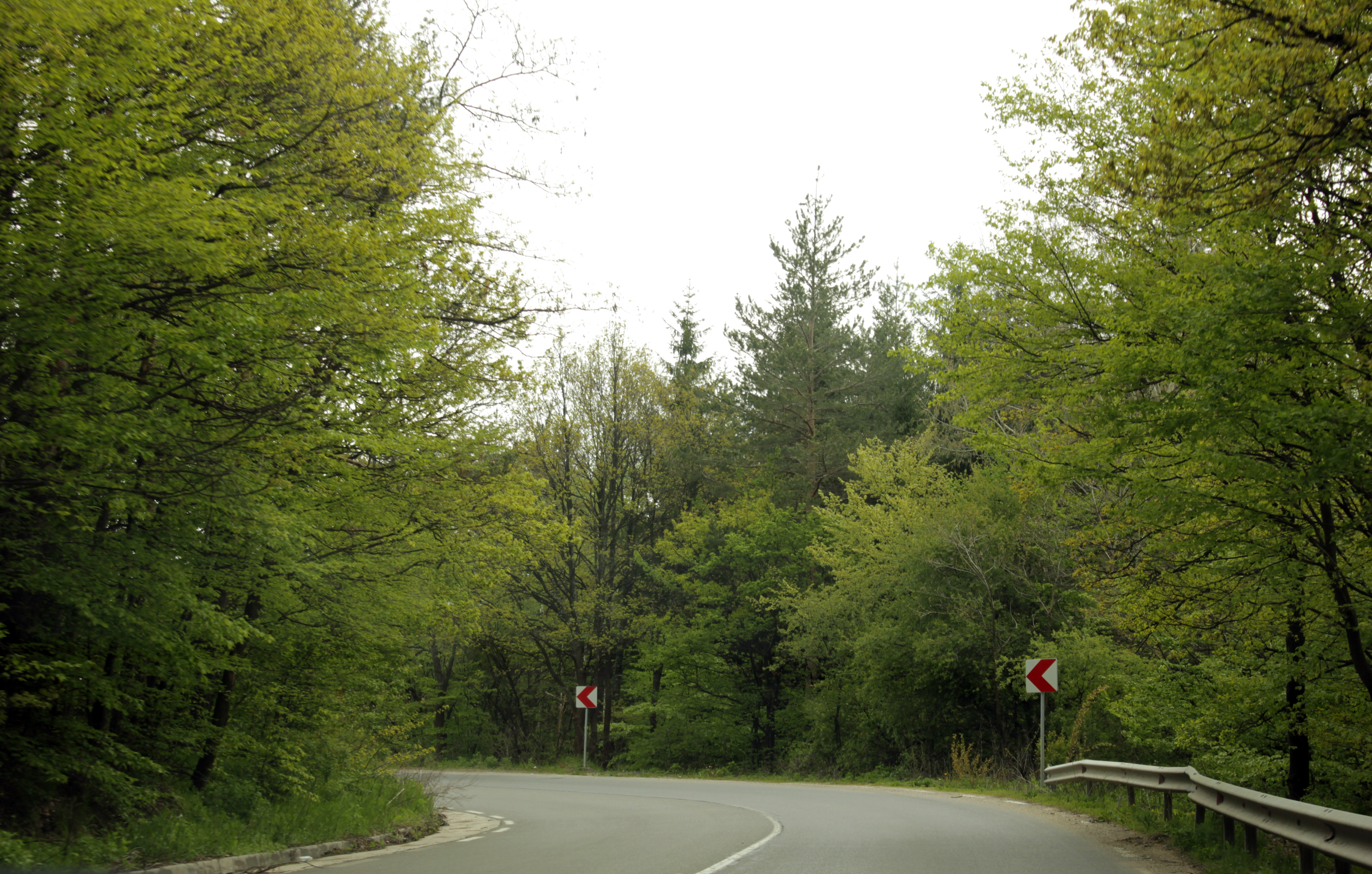
I-6 road at Galabets ridge between the Kamarska Valley and the Zlatitsa–Pirdop Valley

In the Plovdiv Province, road I-6 descends the eastern slope of Koznitsa, passes north of the town of Klisura and enters the Karlovo Valley. It crosses the valley along its entire length from west to east, passing successively through the villages of Rozino, Karnare, Iganovo and Anevo, through the center of the town of Sopot and the southern part of the town of Karlovo. It then crosses the southern part of the village of Vasil Levski, overcomes the transverse ridge of Strazhata, passes south of the town of Kalofer and Stara Zagora Province and the western part of the Kazanlak Valley.

It crosses the valley along its entire length from west to east. It passes successively through the villages of Manolovo, Gabarevo, Dolno Sahrane and Dunavtsi, crosses the southern part of the town of Kazanlak, and then for a distance of 6.6 km it duplicates with the first class I-5 road. It passes south of the town of Maglizh, north of the villages of Dabovo and Vetren and the town of Nikolaevo, and enters the Tvarditsa Valley south of the town of Gurkovo.

After passing north of the Zhrebchevo Reservoir, the road enters Sliven Province, passing south of the village of Orizari and north of the village of Bliznets. It crosses the Binkos Gorge along the river Tundzha at the village of Binkos and enters the Sliven Valley. It bypasses the city of Sliven from the south, passes through the villages of Kaloyanovo, Trapoklovo and Gorno Aleksandrovo and enters Yambol Province at the Petolchkata junction with the first class I-7 road. There, it passes through the village of Lozenets, overcomes a low watershed and at the village of Venets enters the Karnobat Valley and Burgas Province.

In Burgas Province, the I-6 continues east, passes through the town of Karnobat, overcomes another low watershed and enters the easternmost of the sub-Balkan valleys, the Aytos Valley. It passes through the center of the town of Aytos, turns southeast, enters the Burgas Plain, passes through the Vetren neighbourhood of the city of Burgas on the Black Sea coast and in the northwestern part of the city reaches its terminus at Km 234.4 km of the first class I-9 road.
