= Galabets (tunnel) =

Railway tunnel in Bulgaria

Coordinates: 42°43′14″N 23°53′49″E

Overview
- Line: Sofia–Karlovo–Burgas
- Start: Dolno Kamartsi
- End: Bunovo

Operation
- Constructed: 1949–1951
- Opened: 1951
- Owner: National Railway Infrastructure Company

Technical
- Length: 3,034 m (9,954 ft)
- No. of tracks: single track
- Track gauge: 1,435 mm (4 ft 8 1/2 in) (standard gauge)
- Electrified: 25 kV
- Max elevation: 769 m
- Min elevation: 752 m
- Grade: 10‰ / 2‰

Route map
- Galabets (tunnel) (Bulgaria)

Galabets is a railway tunnel under the Galabets ridge in Stara Planina, Bulgaria. The tunnel has a length of 3.034 kilometres (1.885 mi) and connects Dolno Kamartsi with Bunovo.

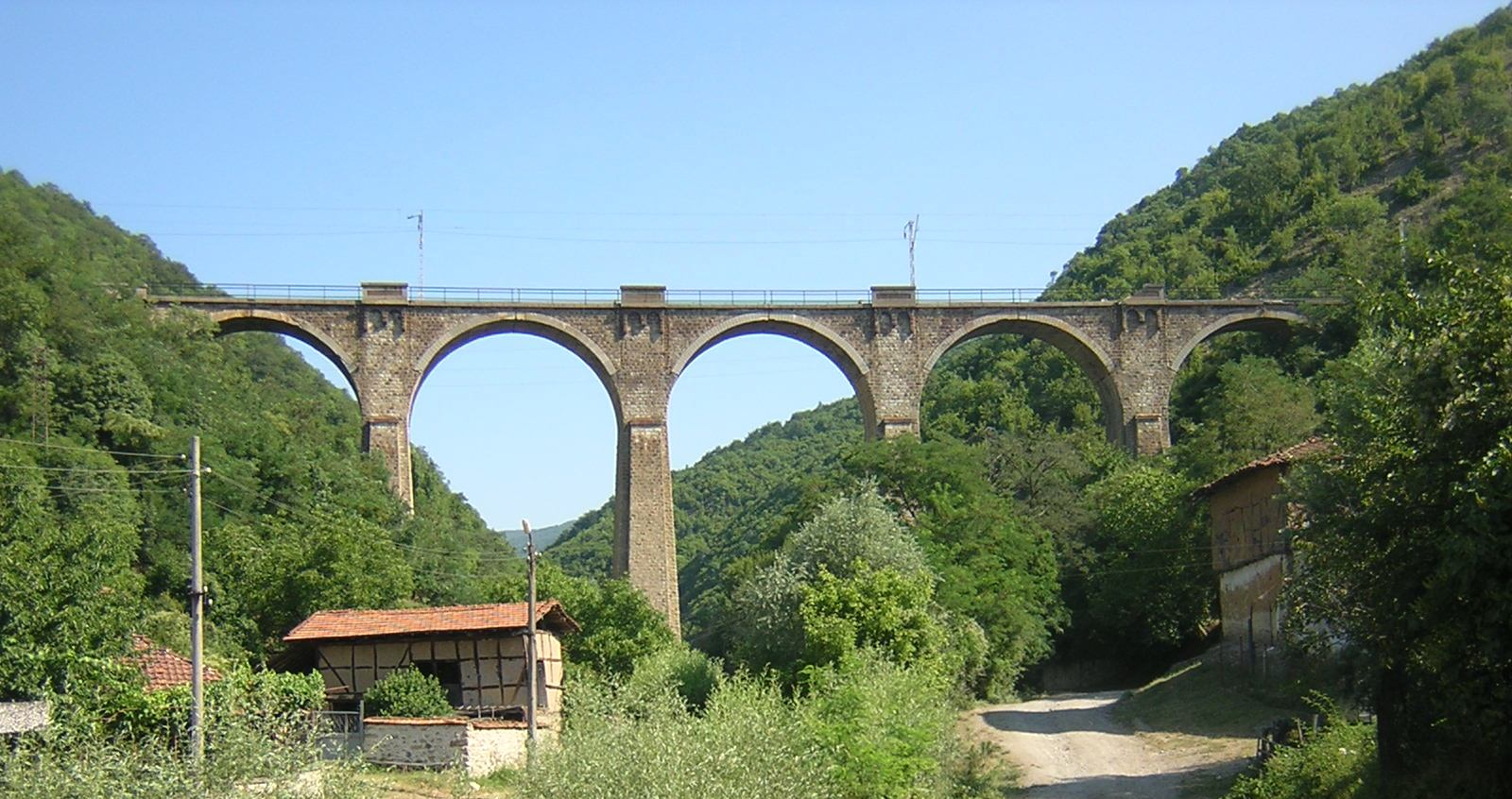
From the eastern end of the tunnel, the railway passes over the village of Bunovo on a bridge
