= Beledie Han =

Coordinates: 42°53′15″N 23°09′54″E

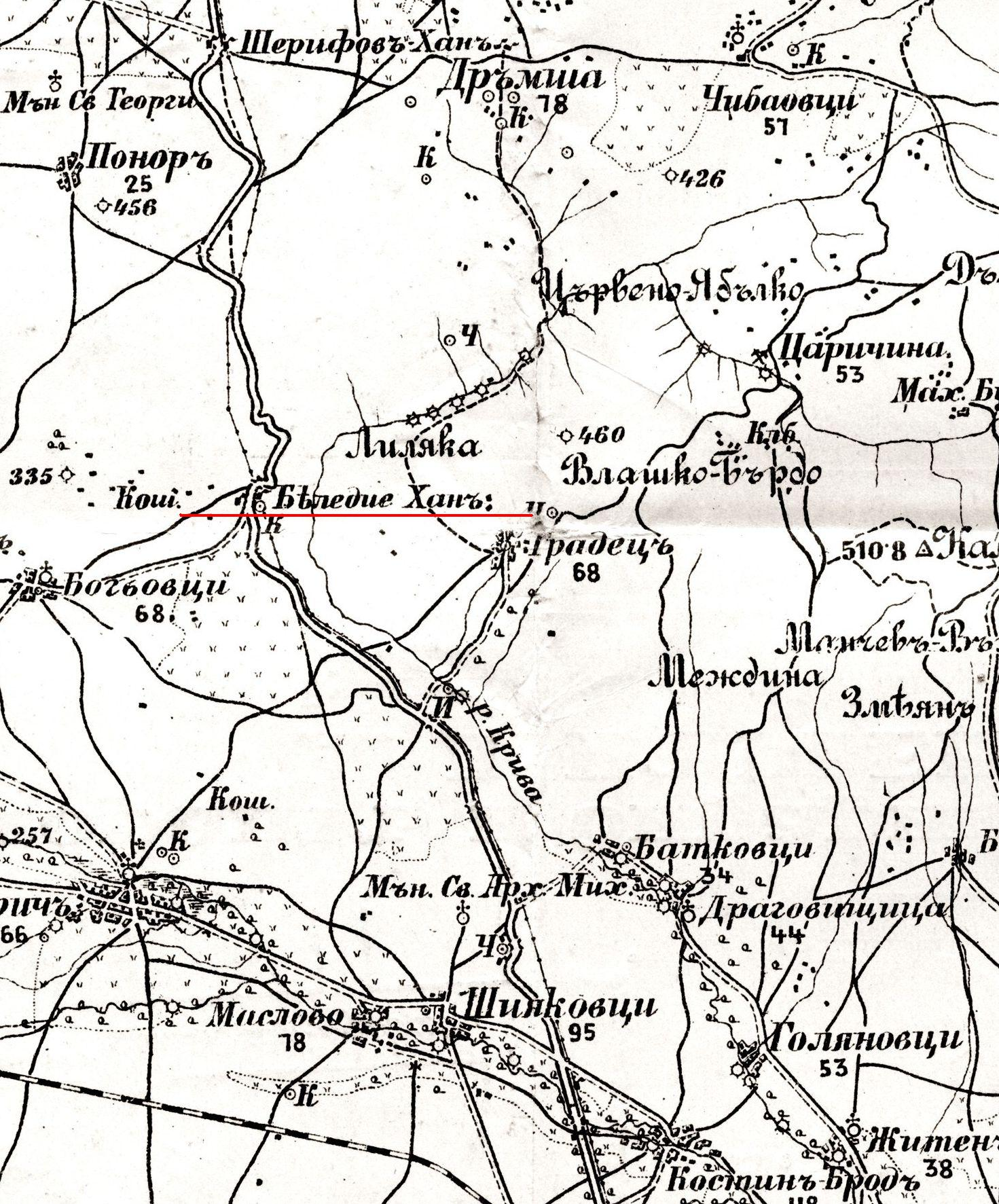
Location of Beledie Han (underlined in red) and Gradets village (right of the red underline)

Beledie Han (Bulgarian: Беледие хан) is a settlement in Kostinbrod Municipality, Sofia Province (Western Bulgaria).

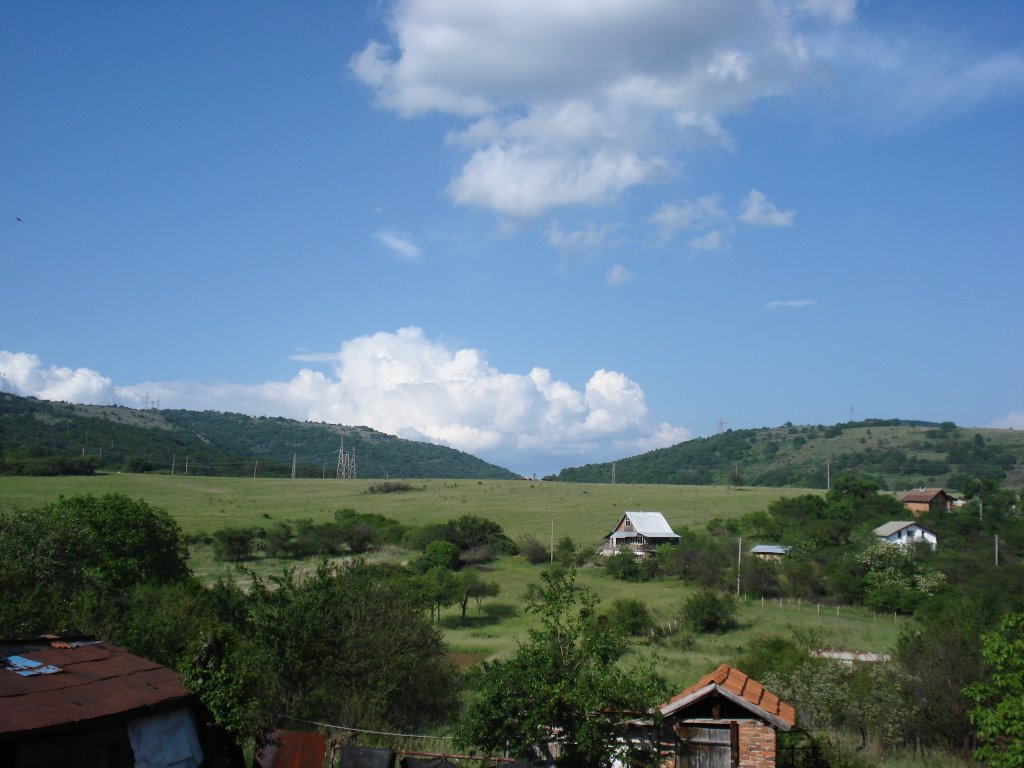
View of Beledie Han outskirts

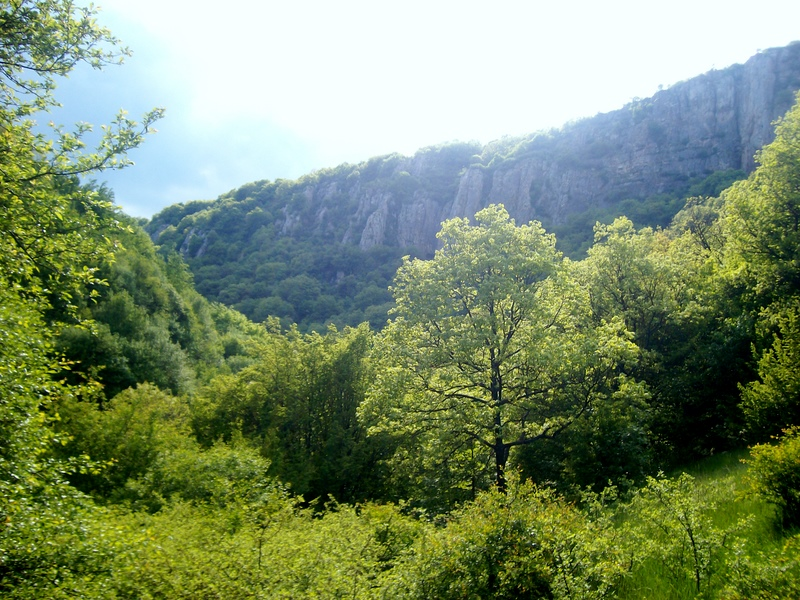

== Geography ==
Although shown separately on maps, since the Liberation of Bulgaria in 1878 the settlement has never been registered as a populated place according to Bulgaria's official regulations. Instead it is considered a part (mahala) of the nearby village Gradets, situated 1.4 kilometers east-southeast.

Beledie Han lies at altitude of 735 meters above sea level, located 11 kilometers north-northwest of the city of Kostinbrod, 18 km from Sofia Ring Road and 26 km from the center of Sofia. It is situated along Lomsko Road (Sofia – Petrohan Pass – Berkovitsa – Montana – Lom).

It is known for its beautiful nature, rock formations and caves, which are located in the region.

Beledie Han is located in a mountainous region, surrounded by forests and meadows. There are many caves in the area, which have been the subject of research by speleologists and nature lovers. Some of the most famous caves in the region are: Beledie Han Cave - the largest and most famous cave in the region. Dragon's Hole Cave - known for its beautiful rock formations. The Bats Cave - known for its many bats.

== History ==
The settlement originated near an old Roman road. Near the village, along the old Roman road, some ruins of an ancient settlement can still be found.

Beledie Han is an old settlement that existed during the Ottoman rule. Its name comes from the Turkish word "belediye", which means "municipality". In the past, Beledie Han was an important commercial center, where the roads from Sofia to Vratsa and Vidin crossed.

Various legends explain the name of the village. Some say it was named after the daughter Bella of an inn keeper. During the Ottoman rule, there was a municipal inn here (Turkish: belediye means "municipality"), where horse-drawn carriages replaced tired horses with rested ones. In the inn, passengers rested before climbing the mountain to the Petrohan Pass.

Today Beledie Han is a popular place for recreation and tourism. There are many opportunities for hiking, cycling and rock climbing in the area. Over the years, the place has become a favorite destination for recreation in nature.

== Events ==
In the beginning of the summer, the music festival Lilac OpenAir is held in the area close to Lyulaka hut.

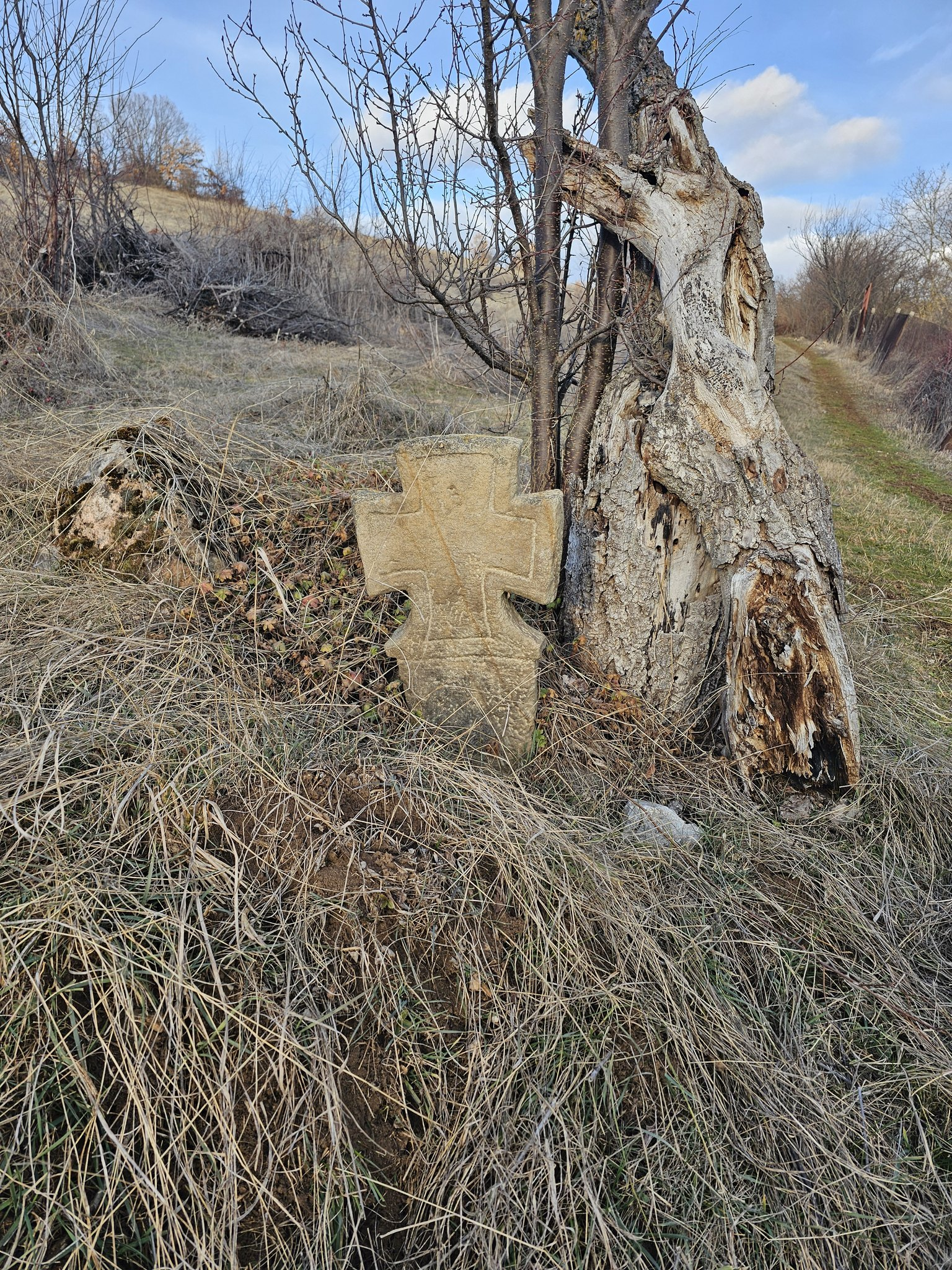
The votive cross in the Beledie Han region

Years ago the annual local 'sabor' gathering was organized on 2 June but the tradition faded after 1989.

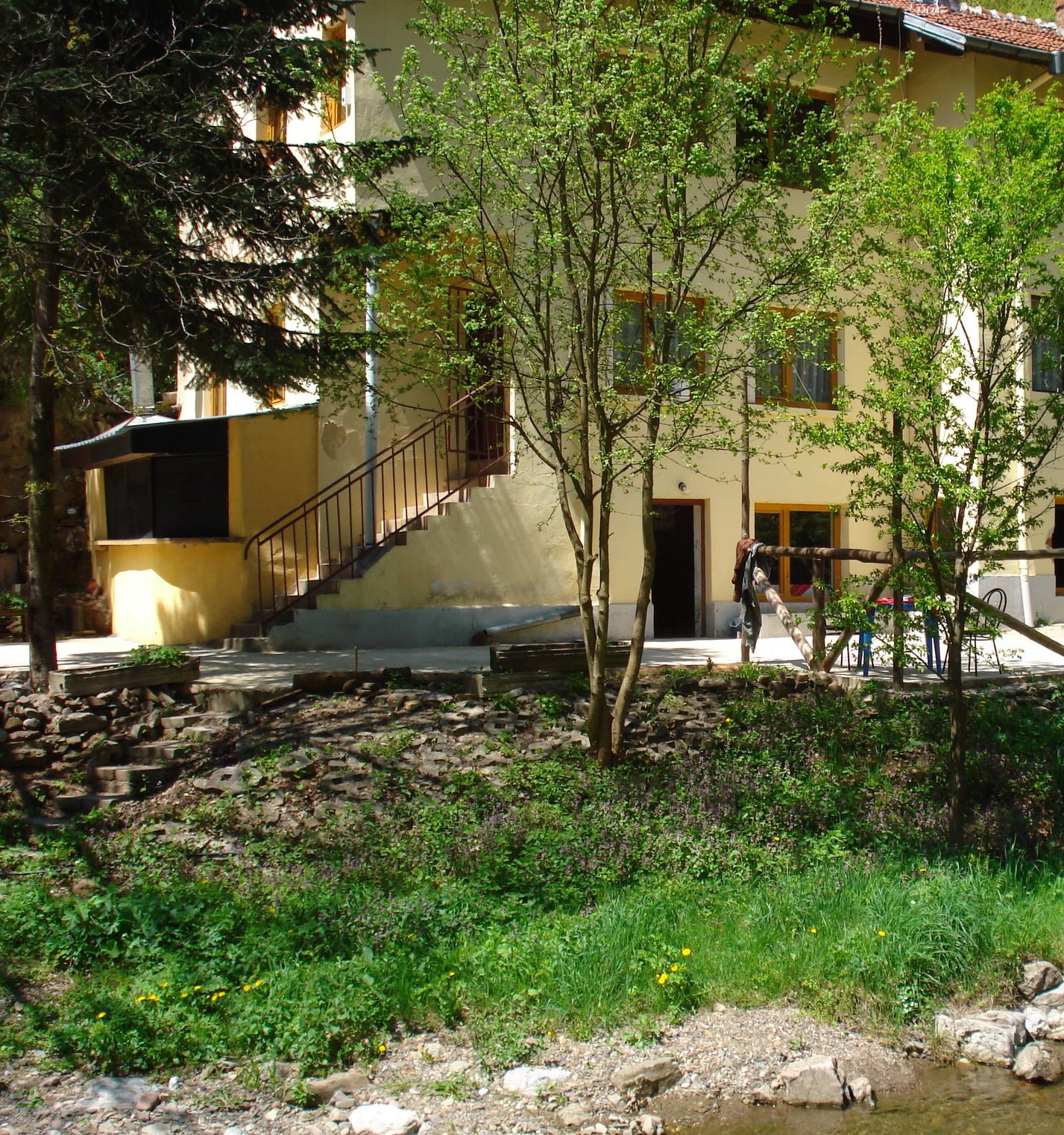
Lyulaka hut

After 2022, the tradition of locals organizing a community feast (kurban) on the first Saturday after Ascension Day has gradually returned to Beledie Han. People gather around the old votive cross at the foot of the Dedina Glava hill, which is located near one of the approaches to the hiking trail leading to the Tri Ushi mountain ridge.

== Lyulaka hut ==
The mountain hut Lyulaka is situated in Mala mountain (a part of Western Stara planina), 600 meters northeast from Beledie Han, 610 m above sea level. The hut has 35 beds, tourist kitchen and a canteen.

There are many caves (ca. 30) nearby the hut. The river Kriva flows by the hut and around many picturesque meadows suitable for picnics. It is believed that the area has buried gold and untold riches, which makes it interesting for treasure hunters.

== Environmental protection ==
The area around Belediye Han falls within the protected area. Its land is included in the European ecological system Natura 2000.

The residents of the village zealously protect nature and protest against attempts to turn its land into an industrial zone according to plans by the Kostinbrod municipality. Private investors are proposing the construction of a huge photovoltaic park and a green hydrogen plant.
