= Gorna Malina =

Gorna Malina Горна Малина
- Village
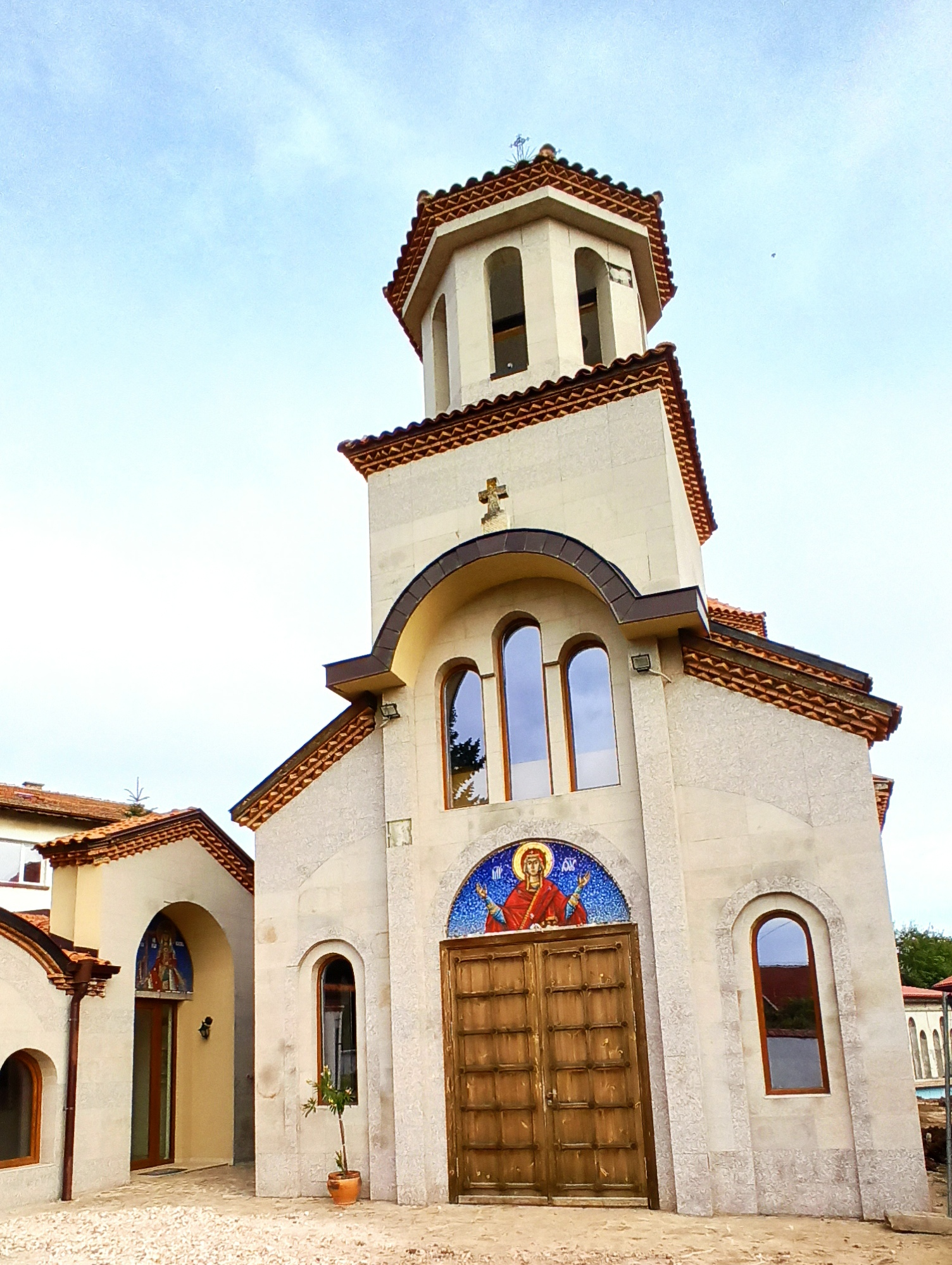

- Location of Gorna Malina
- Coordinates: 42°41′N 23°42′E
- Province: Sofia Province
- Municipality: Gorna Malina

Government
  - Mayor: Angel Zhilanov
- Elevation: 620 m (2,030 ft)

Population (2008)
  - Total: 1,482
- Time zone: UTC+2 (EET)
  - Summer (DST): UTC+3 (EEST)
- Postal Code: 2131
- Area code: 07152

Gorna Malina (Bulgarian: Горна Малина, pronounced [ˈɡɔrnɐ ˈmalinɐ]) is a village in western Bulgaria, part of Sofia Province. It is the administrative centre of Gorna Malina Municipality, which lies in the central eastern part of Sofia Province, 20-30 kilometres east of Sofia. The village is located between the western Balkan Mountains to the north and the Sredna Gora range to the south. It lies in the southwestern reaches of the small Saranska Valley next to a low ridge that separates it from the much larger Sofia Valley to the southwest.

== Honour ==
Malina Cove on Low Island in the South Shetland Islands, Antarctica is named after Gorna Malina.
