= Saranska Valley =

Valley in Bulgaria

- Valley
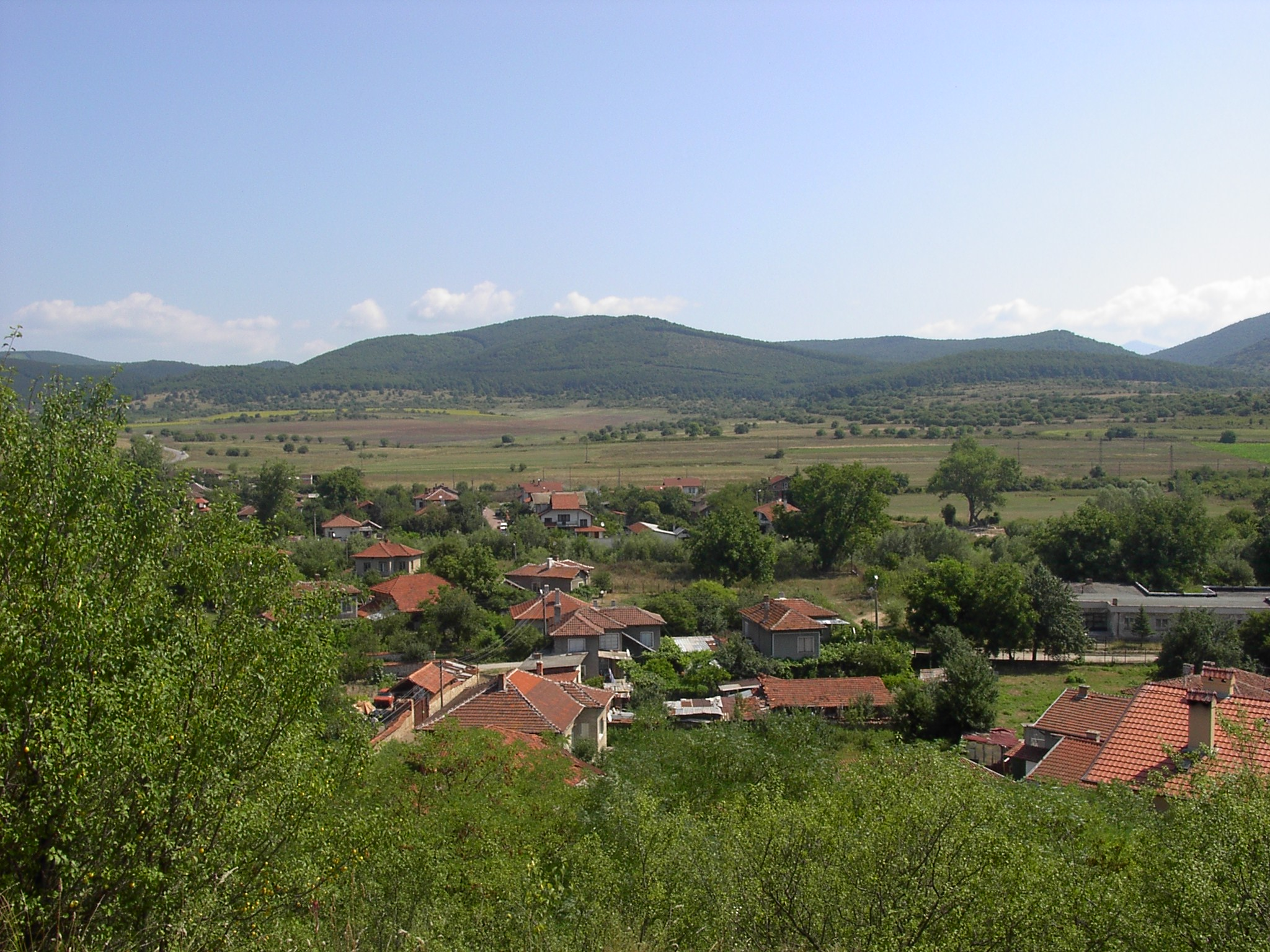
- The valley at the village of Chekanchevo
- Interactive map of Saranska Valley
- Coordinates: 42°42′48.96″N 23°44′48.84″E
- Location: Bulgaria

Area
  - Total: 35 km^{2} (14 sq mi)

Dimensions
  - Length: 10 km (6.2 mi)
  - Width: 5 km (3.1 mi)

Saranska Valley (Bulgarian: Саранска котловина) is situated in central western Bulgaria and is the third of the eleven Sub-Balkan valleys in direction west–east. It is named after the village of Sarantsi.

The valley is enclosed between the Murgash division of the Balkan Mountains to the north and the Sredna Gora mountain range to the south. To the west the Negushevski ridge separates it from the large Sofia Valley and to the east the Oporski ridge separates it from the small Kamarska Valley.

Saranska valley spans a territory of 35 km^{2}. Its length from north to south is 10 km; the maximum width is 5 km. The average altitude is 600 m and is inclined in southern direction. The valley's floor is filled with river sediments, and its slopes are made of Paleozoic, Jurassic and Cretaceous rocks. The northern and middle parts are drained by the Makotsevska reka, and the southern — by the Azmak, both right tributaries of the Lesnovska reka, itself a right tributary of the Iskar of the Danube basin. The soils are mainly alluvial.

The valley is located in Sofia Province, on the territory of Gorna Malina Municipality. There are seven villages — Gorna Malina to the west, Negushevo to the northwest, Osoitsa to the north, Sarantsi, Chekanchevo and Makotsevo to the east and Belopoptsi to the south. From west to east between Gorna Malina and Sarantsi the valley is traversed by an 8.5 km stretch of the first class I-6 road Gyueshevo–Sofia–Karlovo–Burgas. Parallel to the road runs the railway line No. 3 Iliyantsi (Sofia)–Karlovo–Sliven–Karnobat–Varna served by the Bulgarian State Railways.

== Sources ==
- Мичев (Michev), Николай (Nikolay); Михайлов (Mihaylov), Цветко (Tsvetko); Вапцаров (Vaptsarov), Иван (Ivan); Кираджиев (Kiradzhiev), Светлин (Svetlin) (1980). Географски речник на България [Geographic Dictionary of Bulgaria] (in Bulgarian). София (Sofia): Наука и култура (Nauka i kultura).
- Дончев (Donchev), Дончо (Doncho); Каракашев (Karakashev), Христо (Hristo) (2004). Теми по физическа и социално-икономическа география на България (Topics on Physical and Social-Economic Geography of Bulgaria) (in Bulgarian). София (Sofia): Ciela. ISBN 954-649-717-7.
