= Galabets, Haskovo Province =

Galabets
- Village
- Location in Bulgaria
- Coordinates: 41°50′38″N 25°26′17″E
- Country: Bulgaria
- Province: Haskovo Province
- Municipality: Haskovo
- Time zone: UTC+2 (EET)
  - Summer (DST): UTC+3 (EEST)

Galabets is a village in the municipality of Haskovo, in Haskovo Province, in southern Bulgaria.

This village, once belonged to the Hasköylü Ağalık, (Agaluk of Haskovo)
