= Sub-Balkan valleys =

Row of valleys in Bulgaria

A map of the Sub-Balkan valley in pink, with the Balkan Mountains to the north in blue and the Fore-Balkan in orange

The Sub-Balkan Valleys (Bulgarian: Подбалкански котловини, romanized: Podbalkanski kotlovini) are row of 11 valleys running from the Bulgarian border with Serbia east to the Black Sea. They separate the Balkan Mountains from another mountain chain known as Srednogorie, which includes Vitosha and Sredna Gora. The valleys have an abundance of mineral waters. They are divided into two parts: western (higher) and eastern (lower). The western valleys include: Burel Valley; Sofia Valley; Saranska Valley; Kamarska Valley. The eastern valleys are: Zlatitsa–Pirdop Valley; Karlovo Valley; Kazanlak Valley; Tvarditsa Valley; Sliven Valley; Karnobat Valley; Aytos Valley.
