= Sarantsi =

Sarantsi Саранци
- Village
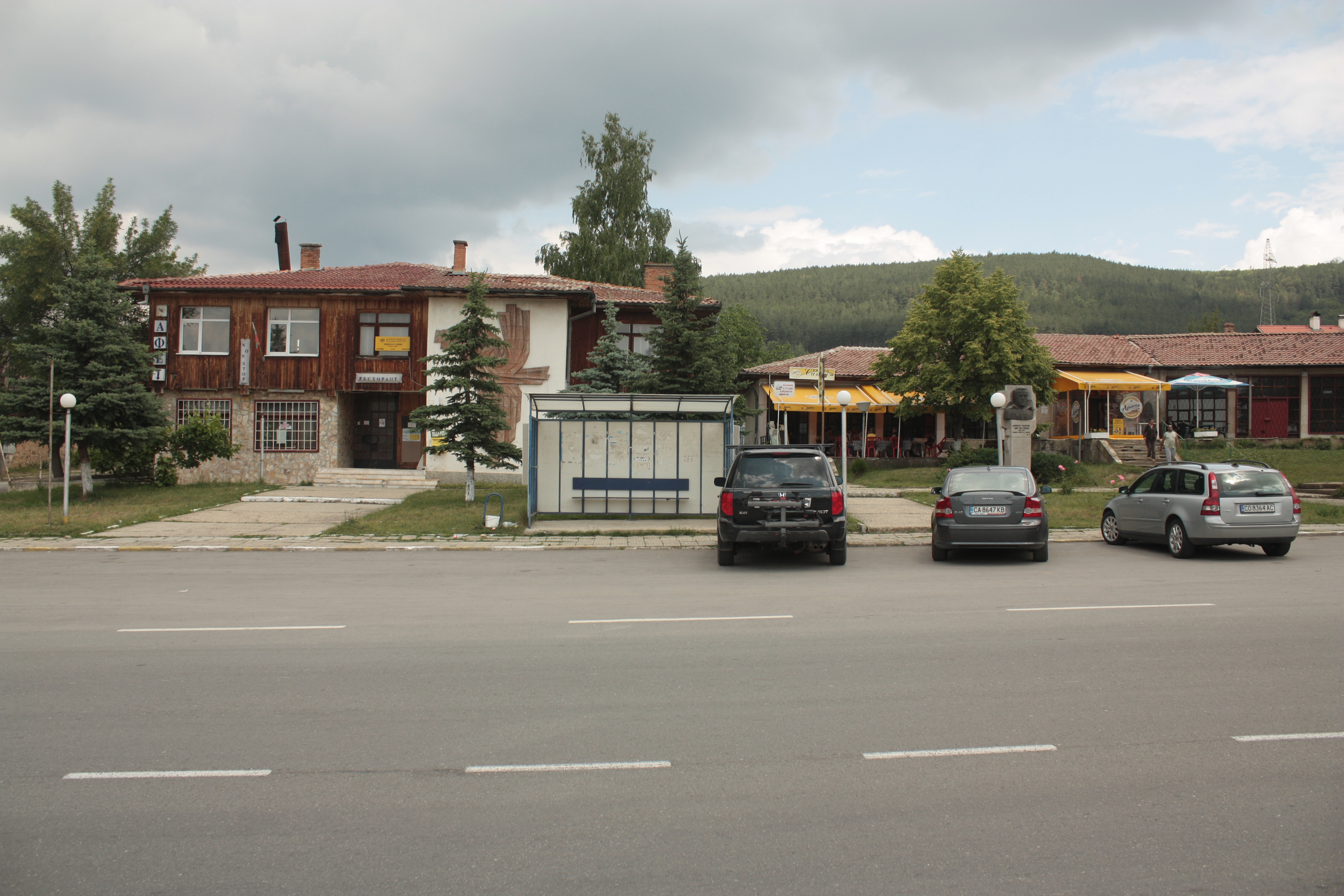

- Location within Bulgaria
- Coordinates: 42°43′0″N 23°46′0″E
- Country: Bulgaria
- Province: Sofia Province
- Municipality: Gorna Malina Municipality
- Elevation: 643 m (2,110 ft)

Population (2015)
  - Total: 318

Sarantsi (Bulgarian: Саранци) is a village in western Bulgaria, located in the Saranska Valley between the Balkan Mountains to the north and Sredna Gora mountain range to the south. It is in the municipality of Gorna Malina, Sofia Province.

The village is 37 km northeast of Sofia and has its own railway station, which is 2 km away from the village.

== History ==
The old name of the village is Tashkessen, or Tashkesan. It is the site of the Battle of Tashkessen.
