= Gyueshevo =

Village in Bulgaria

Gyueshevo (Bulgarian: Гюешево, pronounced [ˈɡju.ɛʃɛvo]; also transliterated Gjueshevo, Giueshevo, Gjueševo) is a village in Kyustendil Municipality, Kyustendil Province, in western Bulgaria. As of 2006 the population is 275 and the mayor is Stoyne Maksimov. The village is located on the border with North Macedonia and is the most important of the three border checkpoints between the two countries. It is the last stop of the railway from Sofia. This railway was intended to link the capital to Skopje and in the late 1990's and early 2000's there was a plan to restart the completion of the line. The Train station was renovated and a Customs office was built on the Bulgarian side, however the Macedonian section of the line was not completed. The main source of income since 1945 was agriculture and the village's Led-Zinc mine, which was closed in 2003. Gyueshevo lies at 42°14′13″N 22°28′35″E, 1,016 metres above sea level, in the Osogovo mountains. The local railway station was built in 1910, while the first school dates to 1888. The Prosveta community centre (chitalishte) was opened in 1921. There is also a church mausoleum dedicated to the perished Bulgarian soldiers in the Balkan Wars and the First World War. Gyueshevo was first mentioned in 1570 as Gyuveshevo. The name is thought to originate from the personal name Gyuesh, probably a derivative of George; –esh is a rare personal name suffix used in names such as Dobresh, Malesh or Radesh.

== Gallery ==
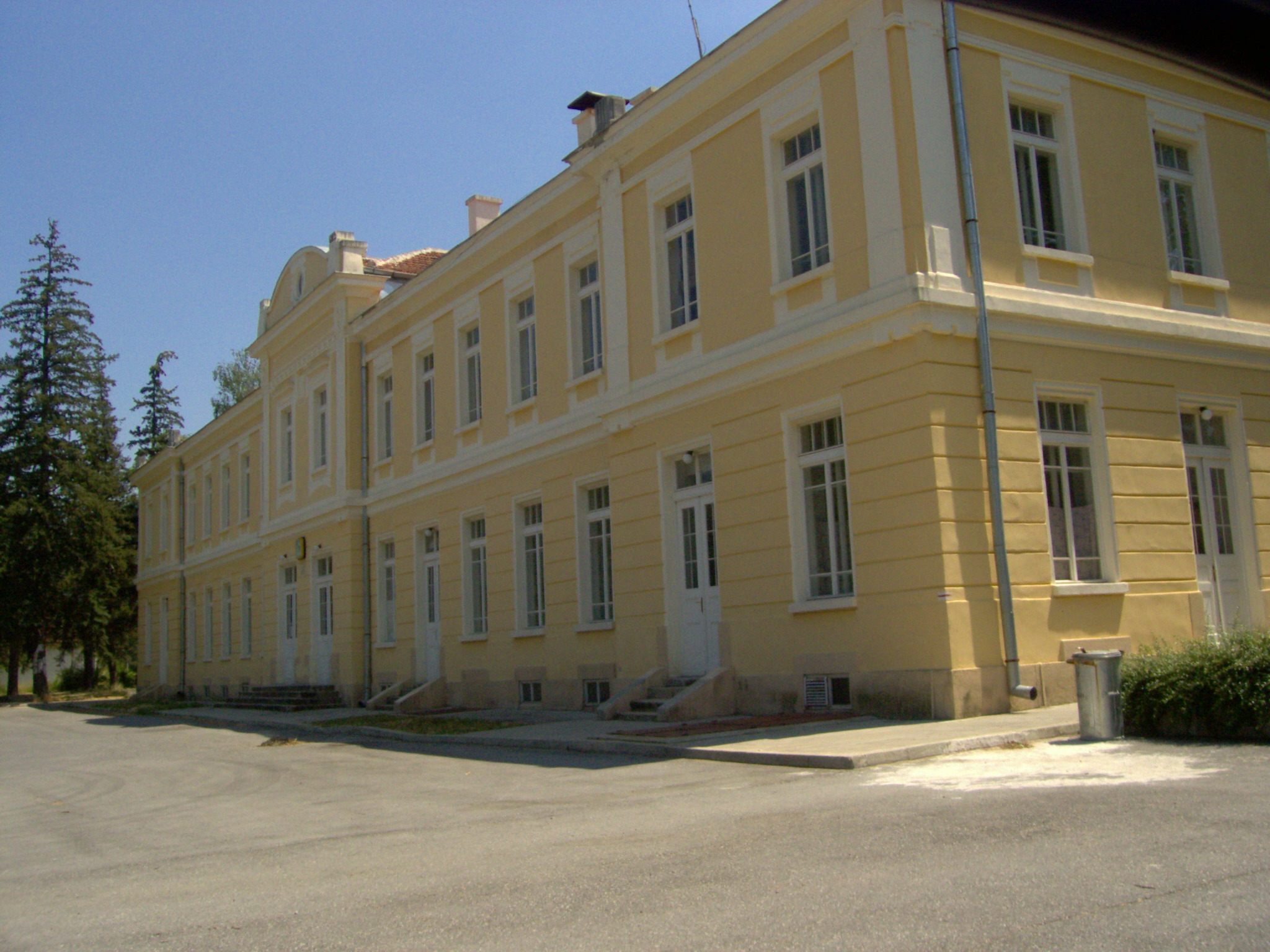
Railway station in Gyeshevo

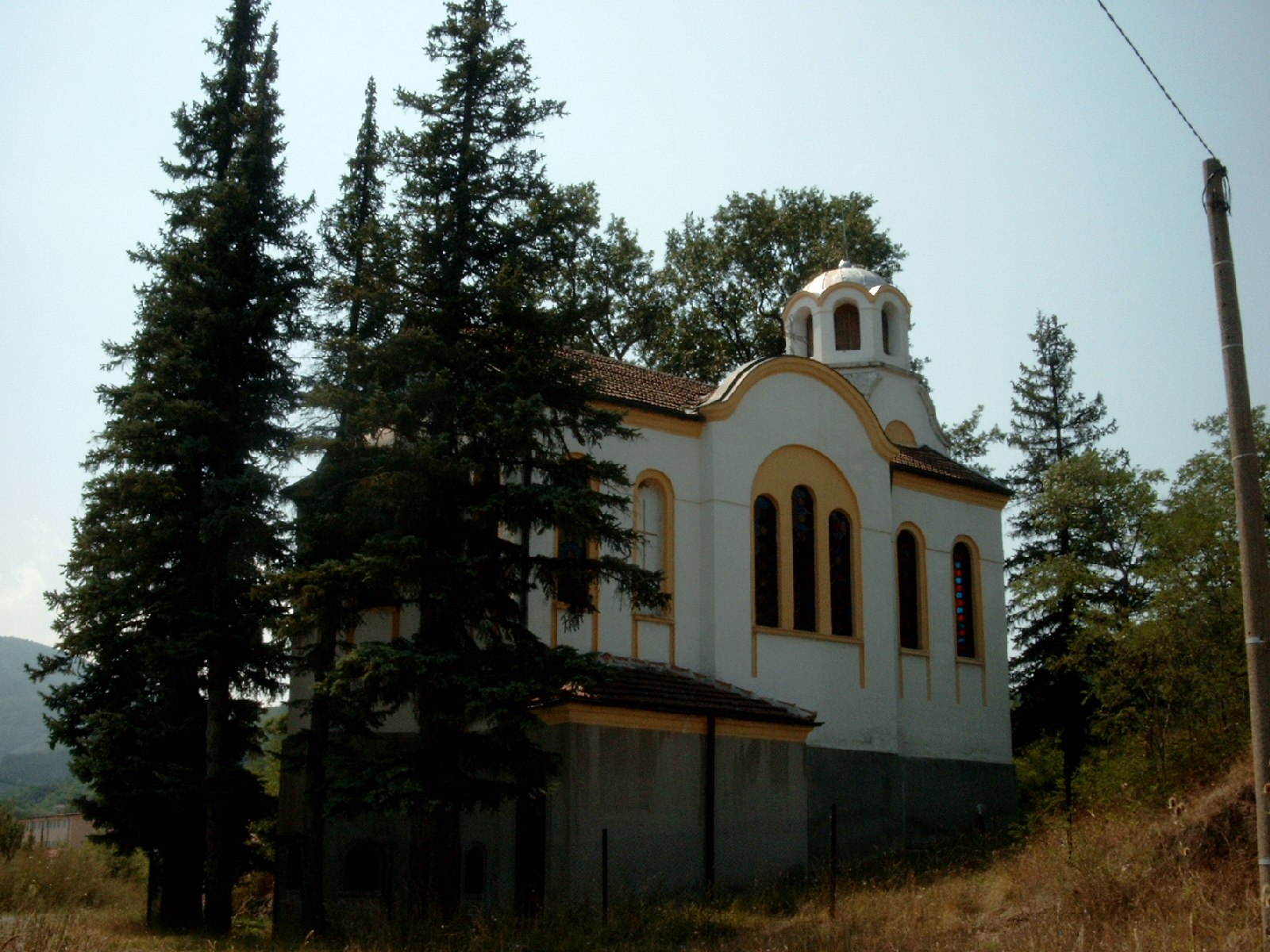
Eastern Orthodox church of the Holy Trinity

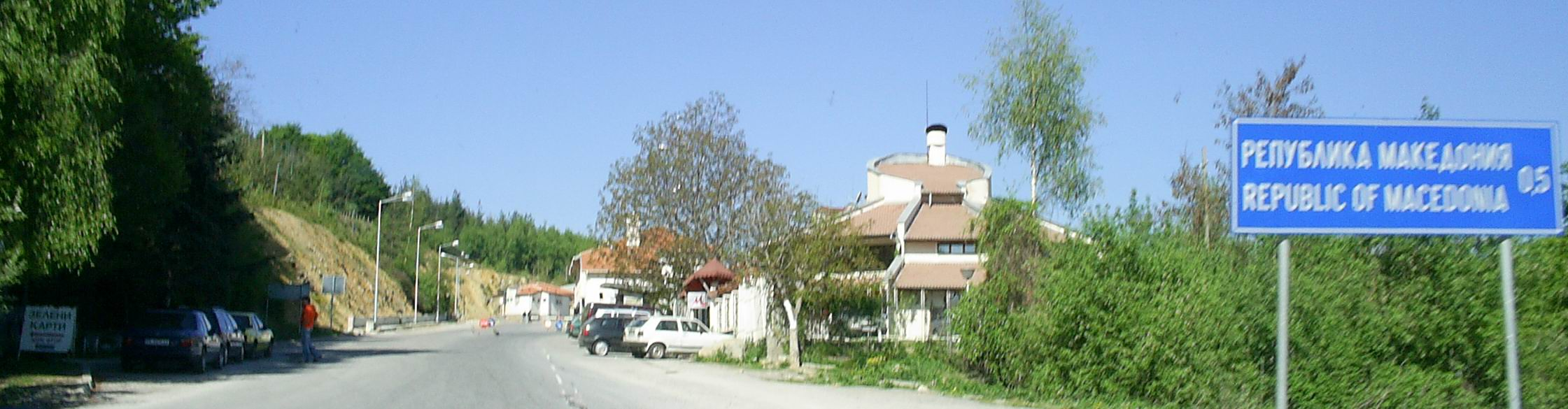
Gyueshevo customs

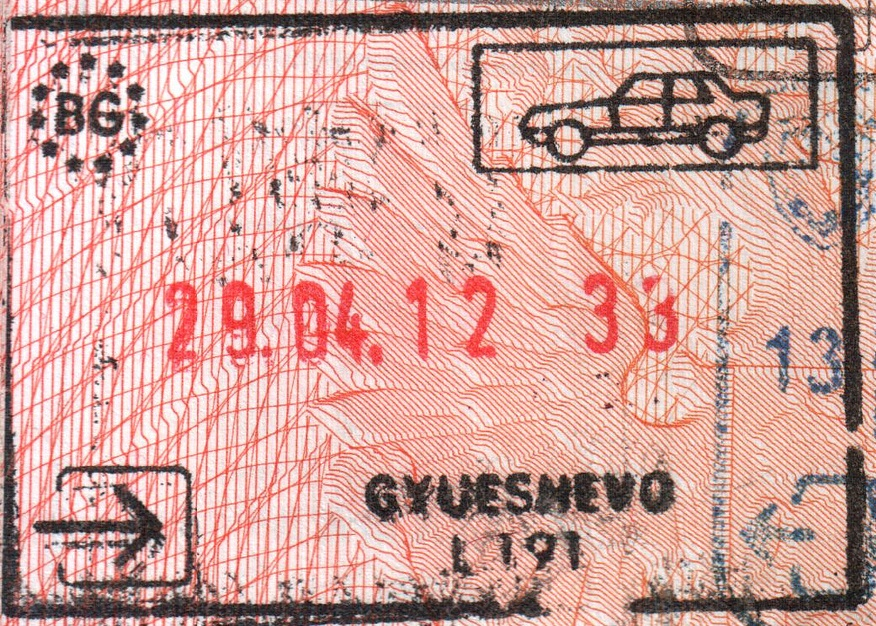
Passport stamp from the border with North Macedonia

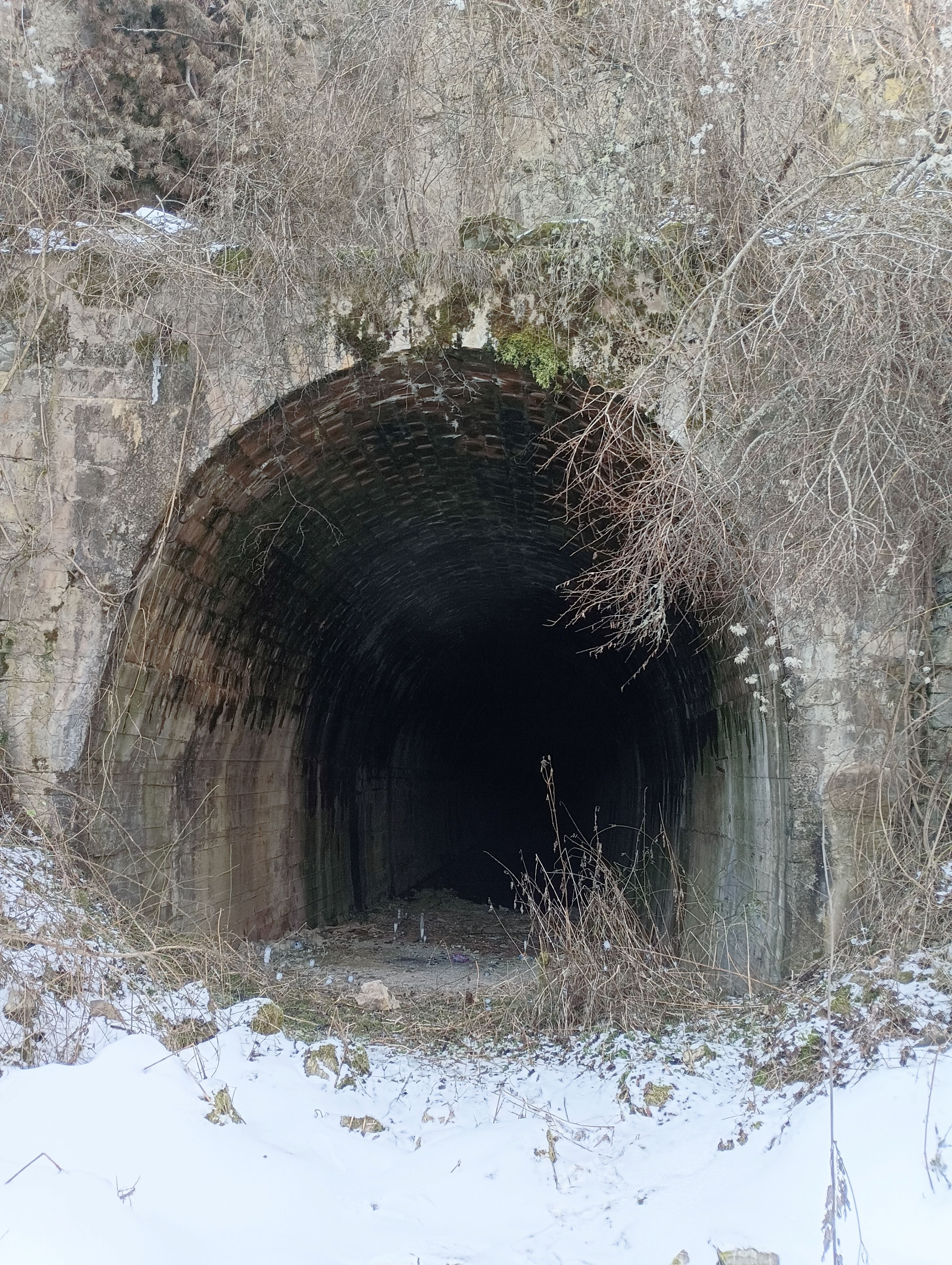
The entrance to the unfinished railway tunnel near Gyueshevo
