= Kostenets (disambiguation) =

Kostenets may refer to:

- Kostenets Municipality - one of 22 municipalities of the Sofia Province in Bulgaria
- Kostenets - a town in and administrative centre of the Kostenets Municipality, Sofia Province, Bulgaria
- Kostenets (village) - a village in the Kostenets Municipality, Sofia Province, Bulgaria
- The literary form of the Slavic name Kosinets of the Greek village of Ieropigi.
