= Kostenets–Dolna Banya Valley =

Valley in Bulgaria

- Valley
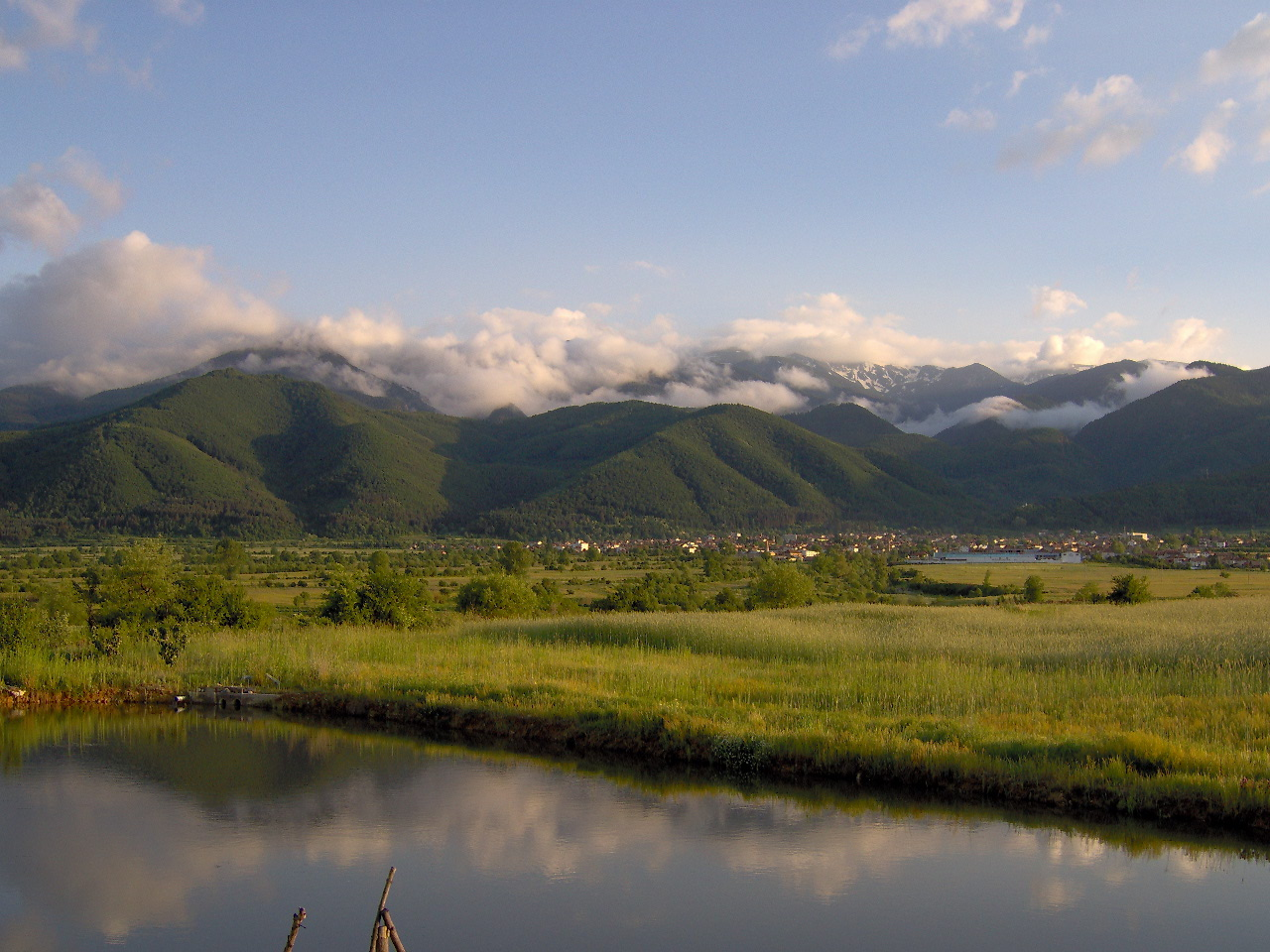
- The valley at the village of Kostenets
- Interactive map of Kostenets–Dolna Banya Valley
- Coordinates: 42°18′36″N 23°51′29″E
- Location: Bulgaria

Dimensions
  - Length: 18 km (11 mi)
  - Width: 5 km (3.1 mi)

Kostenets–Dolna Banya Valley (Bulgarian: Костенецко-Долнобанска котловина) is situated in western Bulgaria. It is named after the towns of Kostenets and Dolna Banya. The valley has a length of 18 km and a width of up to 5 km. The altitude is 520–680 m.

== Geography ==
The valley is enclosed between Bulgaria's highest mountain range Rila to the south and Sredna Gora mountain range, bound its ridges Shumnatitsa to the west, Septemvriyski to the north–northeast and Vetren to the east. To the north the Septemvriyski ridge separates it from the Ihtiman Valley. It is connected to the Samokov Valley via the Borovets saddle to the west. To the east the Momina Klisura Gorge of the river Maritsa leads to the westernmost reaches of the Upper Thracian Plain.

The surface of the Kostenets–Dolna Banya Valley is uneven, at the foothills of Rila it becomes hilly; in its center are the low terraces of the Maritsa and its tributaries. It southern reaches facing Rila are filled with alluvial fans. The valley was formed during the Neogene–Quaternary period as a result of subsidence along the surrounding peripheral faults. It is filled with Quaternary alluvial, glacial and diluvial sediments. The soils are mainly brown forest and alluvial. There are hot mineral springs at the villages of Kostenets to the south and Pchelin to the north, as well as at the towns of Dolna Banya to the west and Momin Prohod to the northeast. The climate is temperate continental with Alpine influence. The valley is drained by the Maritsa, which flows in direction west–east in its southern parts, and its tributaries the Ibar, the Stara reka, the Ochushnitsa, etc.

== Settlements, transportation and economy ==
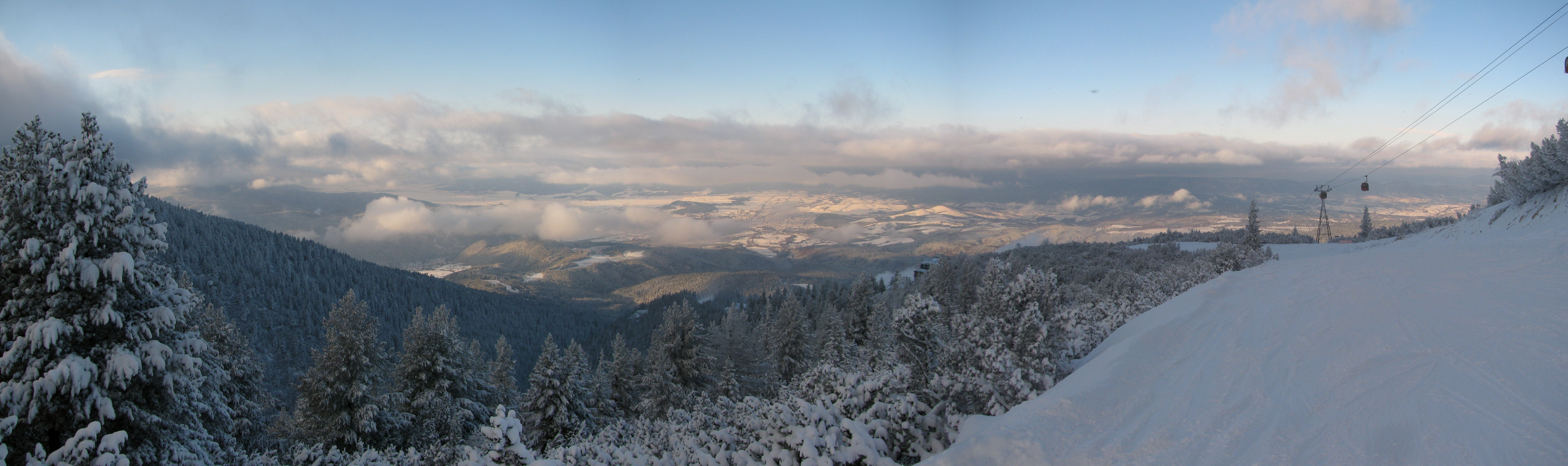
The Samokov Valley (left) and the Konstenets–Dolna Banya Valley (right) from Borovets

Administratively, it falls in Sofia Province, mainly on the territory of the municipalities of Dolna Banya and Kostenets, with the westernmost reaches located in Samokov Municipality. There are three towns — Kostenets, Dolna Banya and Momin Prohod and eight villages — Gorna Vasilitsa, Dolna Vasilitsa, Kostenets, Maritsa, Ochusha, Podgorie, Pchelin and Raduil.

The valley is served by two roads of the national network, as well as local roads. In its eastern section passes a 10.6 km stretch of the first class I-8 road Kalotina–Sofia–Plovdiv–Kapitan Andreevo. To the south the valley is traversed by a 15.1 km section of the second class II-82 road Sofia–Samokov–Kostenets. Parallel to the former runs a section of railway line No. 1 Kalotina–Sofia–Plovdiv–Svilengrad served by the Bulgarian State Railways.

The climatic and soil conditions of the Kostenets–Dolna Banya Valley are favourable for agriculture, the main crops being cereals and potatoes. There are orchards and well developed animal husbandry. The four settlements with mineral springs are balneological and climatic resorts. Of them, Kostenets and Momin Prohod are spa resorts of national importance.

== Sources ==
- Мичев (Michev), Николай (Nikolay); Михайлов (Mihaylov), Цветко (Tsvetko); Вапцаров (Vaptsarov), Иван (Ivan); Кираджиев (Kiradzhiev), Светлин (Svetlin) (1980). Географски речник на България [Geographic Dictionary of Bulgaria] (in Bulgarian). София (Sofia): Наука и култура (Nauka i kultura).
