= List of spa towns in Bulgaria =

The following is a partial list of spa towns in Bulgaria.

Image	Town	Province	Temperature and output
	Balchik (Tuzlata)	Dobrich Province 43°25′N 28°10′E	33 °C; 20 L/s
	Banite	Smolyan Province 41°37′N 25°01′E	1 spring; 35-43 °C
	Banya, Blagoevgrad Province	Blagoevgrad Province 41°53′N 23°32′E	70 springs; 28-58 °C
	Banya, Pazardzhik Province	Pazardzhik Province 42°28′N 24°08′E	38-42 °C; 20 L/s
	Banya, Plovdiv Province	Plovdiv Province 42°33′N 24°50′E	35-46 °C; 30 L/s
	Beden	Smolyan Province 41°43′N 24°29′E	76 °C; 12 L/s
	Belchinski Bani	Sofia Province 42°21′N 23°23′E	37-39 °C
	Burgas (Burgaski Mineralni Bani)	Burgas Province 42°30′N 27°28′E	41 °C; 36 L/s
	Bankya	Sofia City 42°42′N 23°08′E	36.5-37 °C; 24 L/s
	Chiflik	Lovech Province 42°55′N 24°40′E	1 spring; 51 °C; 33 L/s
	Devin	Smolyan Province 41°44′N 24°24′E	37-44 °C; 83 L/s
	Dobrinishte	Blagoevgrad Province 41°49′N 23°24′E	17 springs; 30-43 °C
	Dolna Banya	Sofia Province 42°17′N 23°46′E	2 springs; 26 °C and 62-65 °C; 25 L/s
	Gotse Delchev	Blagoevgrad Province 41°34′N 23°44′E	10 springs; 22 °C
	Eleshnitsa	Blagoevgrad Province	
	Hisarya	Plovdiv Province 42°30′N 24°42′E	22 springs; 14-52°С; 46 L/s
	Kostenets	Sofia Province 42°18′N 23°52′E	47-73 °C
	Kostenets (village)	Sofia Province 42°16′N 23°49′E	46 °C; 15 L/s
	Kyustendil	Kyustendil Province 42°17′N 22°41′E	71.5-73 °C; 33 L/s
	Marikostinovo	Blagoevgrad Province 41°26′N 23°21′E	63 °C; 20 L/s
	Merichleri	Haskovo Province 42°08′N 25°30′E	1 spring; 45 °С
	Mihalkovo	Plovdiv Province 41°51′N 24°26′E	
	Mineralni Bani	Haskovo Province 41°56′N 25°21′E	15 springs; 54-56 °C; 36 L/s
	Momin Prohod	Sofia Province 42°20′N 23°52′E	9 springs; 56 °C
	Narechenski Bani	Plovdiv Province 41°55′N 24°46′E	21.5-33 °С
	Ognyanovo	Blagoevgrad Province 41°37′N 23°48′E	30 springs; 39-43 °C; 70 L/s
	Ovcha kupel (in Sofia)	Sofia City 42°41′N 23°15′E	32 °C; 8 L/s
	Pancharevo	Sofia City 42°35′N 23°24′E	48 °C; 12 L/s
	Pavel Banya	Stara Zagora Province 42°36′N 25°12′E	7 springs; 50-61°С; 16 L/s
	Pchelin	Sofia Province 42°20′48.67″N 23°48′23.18″E	73°С; 13 L/s
	Rupite	Blagoevgrad Province 41°26′N 23°15′E	holly spring;76 °C; 35 L/s
	Saints Constantine and Helena	Varna Province 43°14′N 28°01′E	
	Sandanski	Blagoevgrad Province 41°34′N 23°17′E	20 springs; 41-83°С; 21 L/s
	Sapareva Banya	Kyustendil Province 42°17′N 23°16′E	103 °С
	Shipkovo	Lovech Province 42°53′N 24°33′E	18-38 °C; 10 L/s
	Slivenski Mineralni Bani	Sliven Province 42°41′N 26°20′E	48 °C; 17 L/s
	Sofia	Sofia City 42°42′N 23°20′E	
	Starozagorski Bani	Stara Zagora Province 42°27′N 25°30′E	42 °C; 20 L/s
	Stefan Karadzhovo	Yambol Province 42°13′N 26°50′E	21 °C; 13 L/s
	Strelcha	Pazardzhik Province 42°30′N 24°19′E	36-56 °C; 18 L/s
	Sunny Beach	Burgas Province 42°42′N 27°42′E	28-34 °C; 4.6 L/s
	Varshets	Montana Province 43°11′N 23°17′E	36.4-38 °C; 15 L/s
	Varvara	Pazardzhik Province 42°09′N 24°08′E	15 springs; 92 °C
	Velingrad	Pazardzhik Province 42°01′N 24°00′E	80 springs; 28-96 °C; 170 L/s
	Voneshta Voda	Veliko Tarnovo Province 42°52′N 25°39′E	
	Zheleznitsa	Sofia Province	
