= Pchelin, Sofia Province =

Pchelin Пчелин
- Village
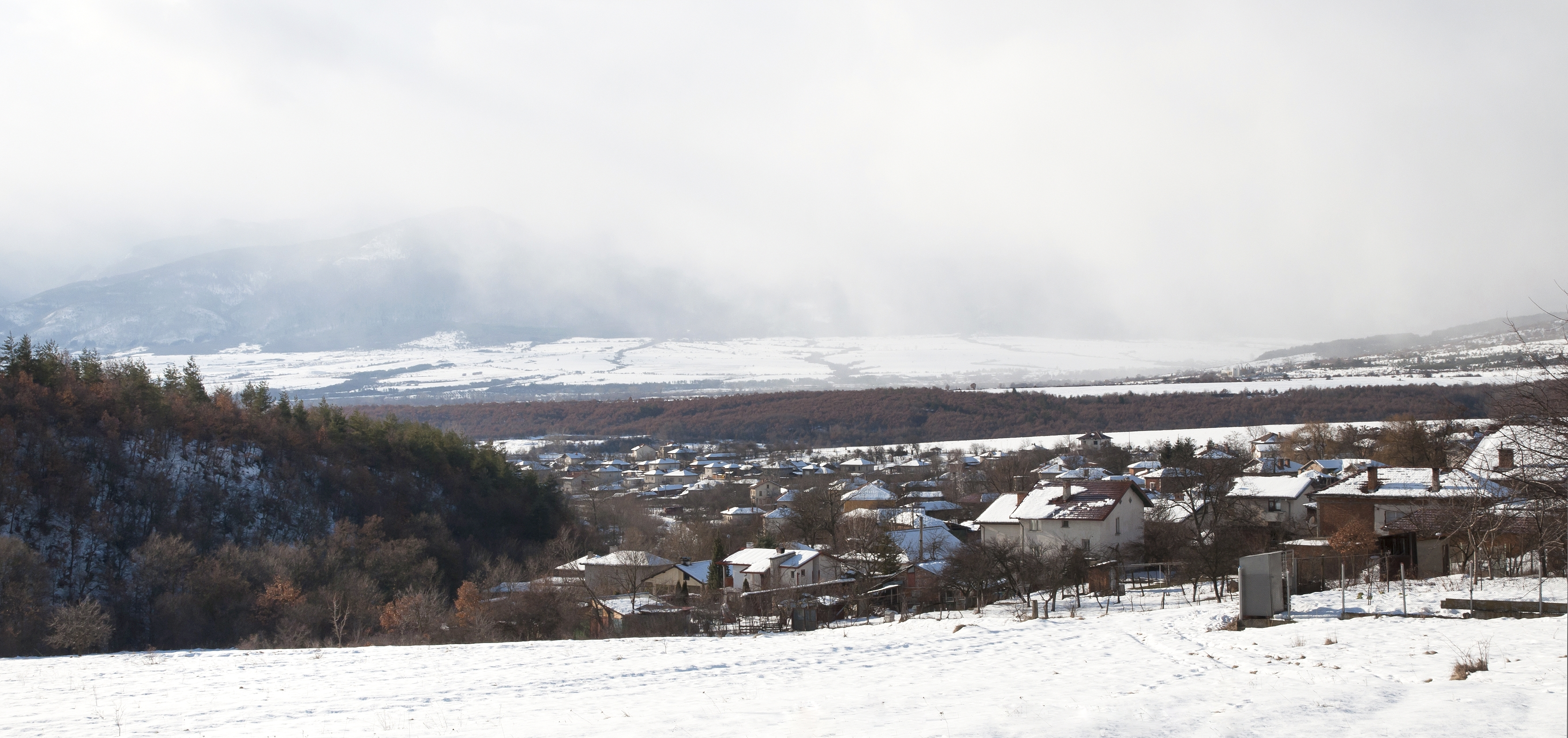

- Location of Pchelin within Bulgaria
- Coordinates: 42°20′48.67″N 23°48′23.18″E
- Country: Bulgaria
- Province: Sofia
- Municipality: Kostenets

Government
  - Mayor: Yordan Angelov (GERB)

Area
  - Total: 15.546 km^{2} (6.002 sq mi)
- Elevation: 589 m (1,932 ft)

Population (2022)
  - Total: 263
  - Density: 16.9/km^{2} (43.8/sq mi)
- Time zone: UTC+2 (EET)
  - Summer (DST): UTC+3 (EEST)
- Postal Code: 2048
- Area codes: 07147 from Bulgaria, 003597147 from outside

Pchelin (Bulgarian: Пчелин) is a village in the Sofia Province southwestern Bulgaria, located in the Kostenets Municipality. As of the 2022 the village had a population of 263. It is a spa resort.

== Geography ==
Pchelin is located in the Kostenets–Dolna Banya Valley at the foothills of the Sredna Gora mountain range, very close to the highest mountain range in the Balkans, Rila. It lies some 70 km southeast of the national capital Sofia, about 8 km of the spa resorts of Momin Prohod and Kostenets and 30 km of the ski resort of Borovets. The village has a territory of 15.546 km^{2}.

It lies just south of the Trakia motorway and east of the first class I-8 road Kalotina–Sofia–Plovdiv–Kapitan Andreevo. There are favourable conditions for agriculture, the main crops include wheat, strawberries and blackcurrant.

== Pchelin mineral baths ==
The spa resort of Pchelin mineral baths is located some 2 km northeast of the village, nestled in a forested valley in the Septemvriyski ridge of Sredna Gora. The mineral springs have a total discharge of 13 L/sec and temperature of 73 °С. According to legends, the springs were used by the soldiers of the Bulgarian emperor Samuel (r. 997–1014), who in 986 dealt a crushing defeated to the Byzantines in the battle of the Gates of Trajan that took place in the vicinity of the village.

== Gallery ==
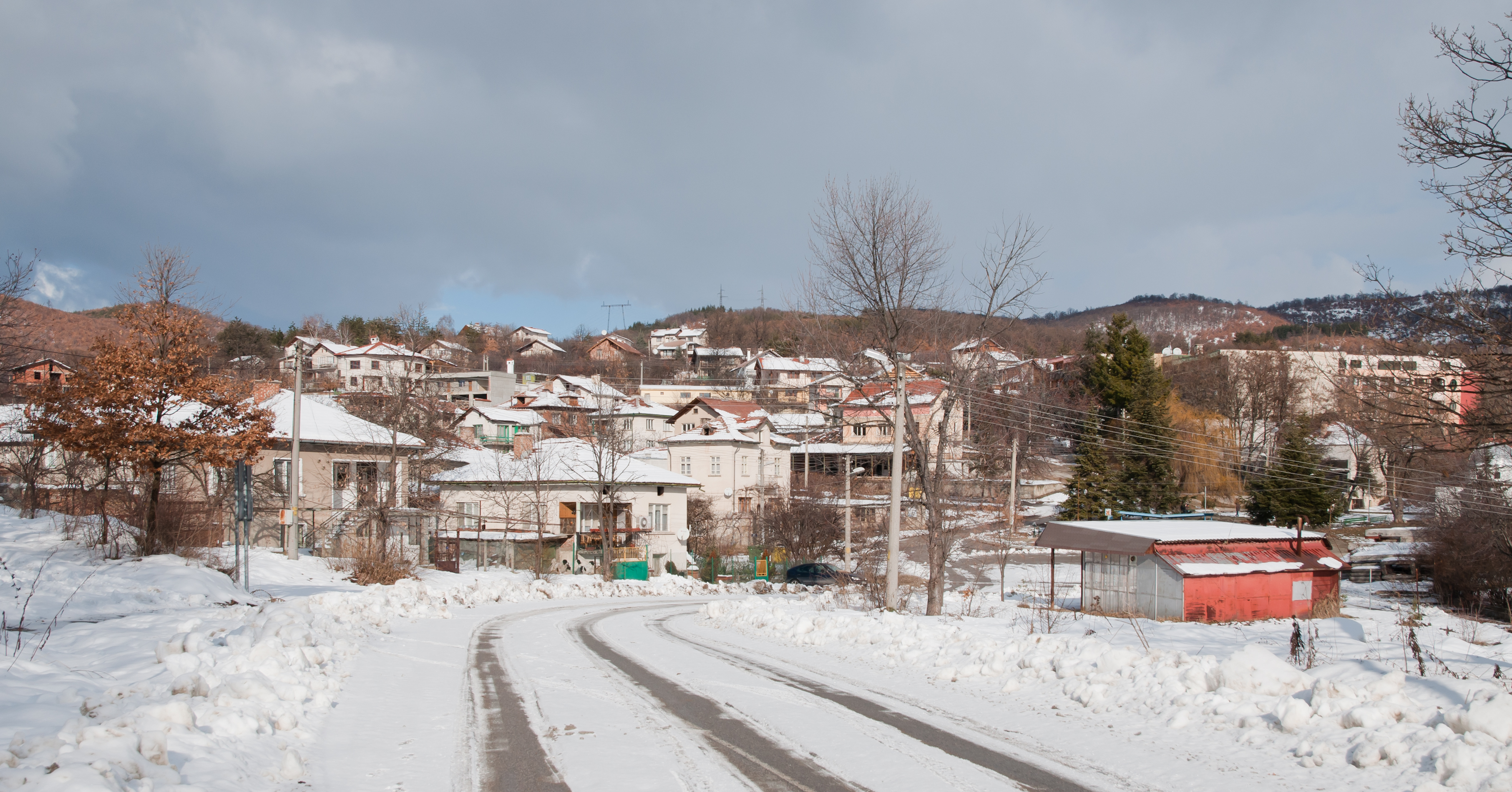
Pchelin mineral baths

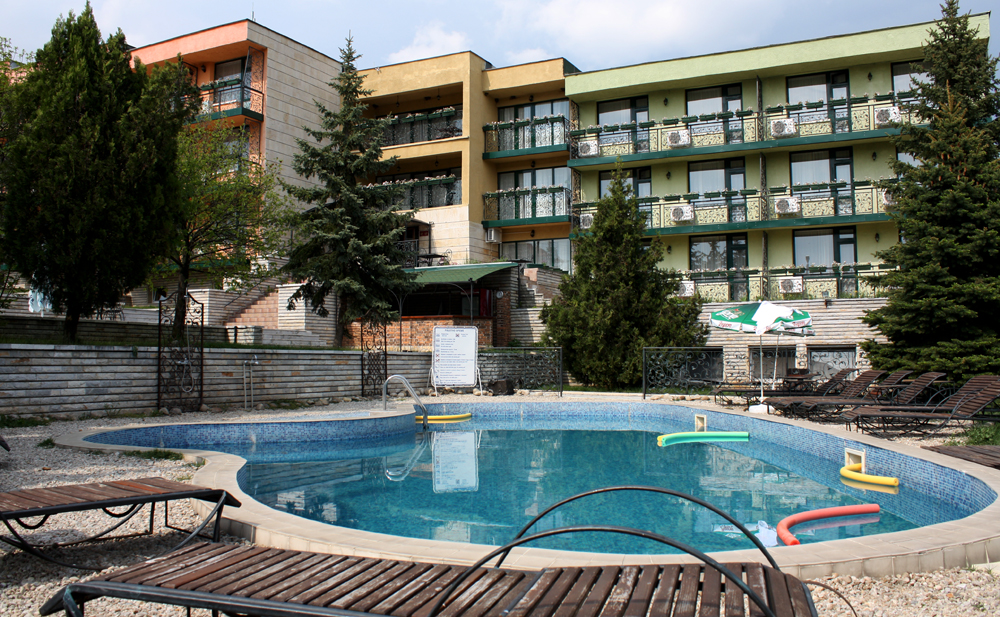
A spa hotel in Pchelin

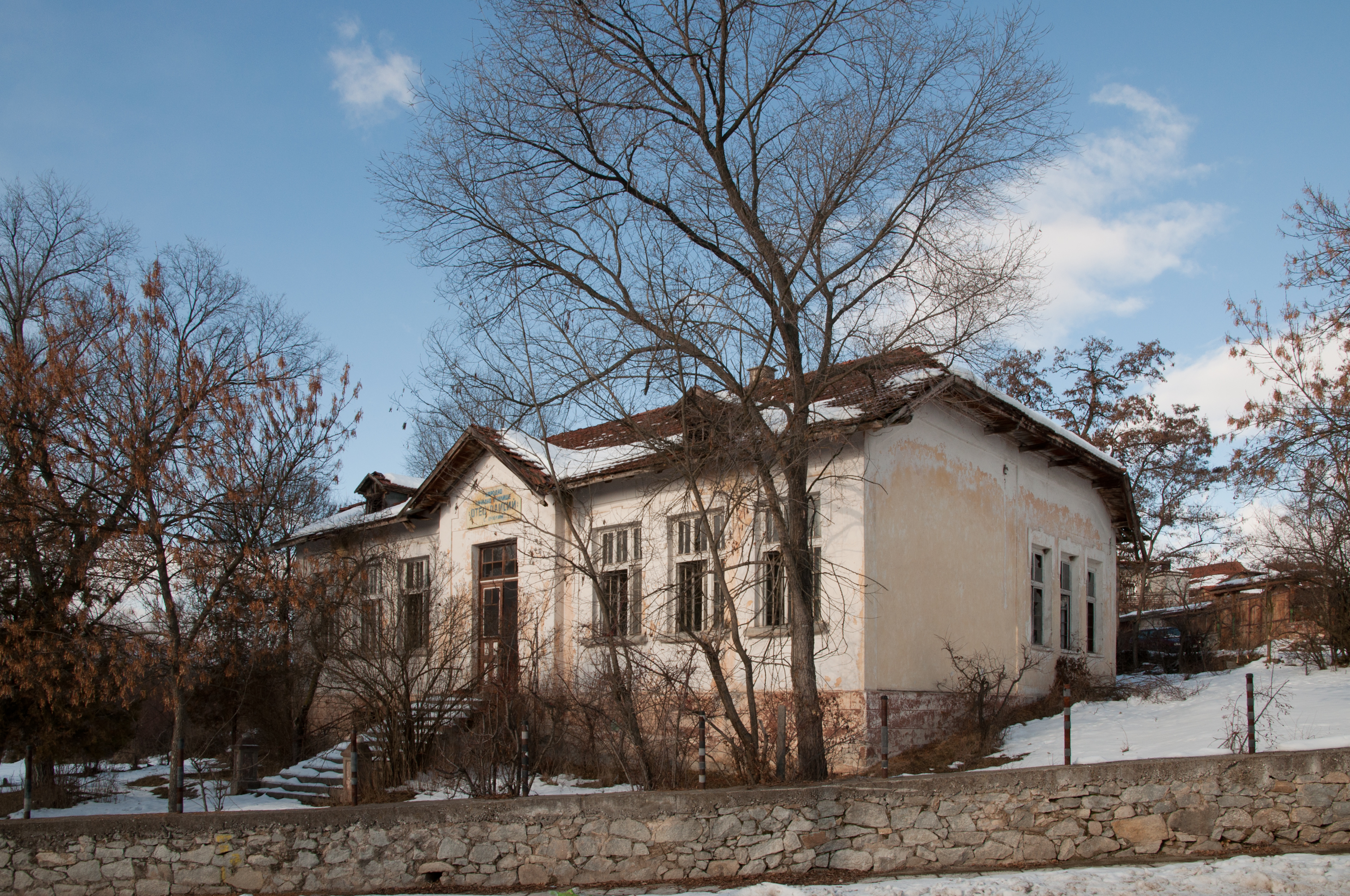
Old school
