= Sliven Valley =

Valley in Bulgaria

- Valley
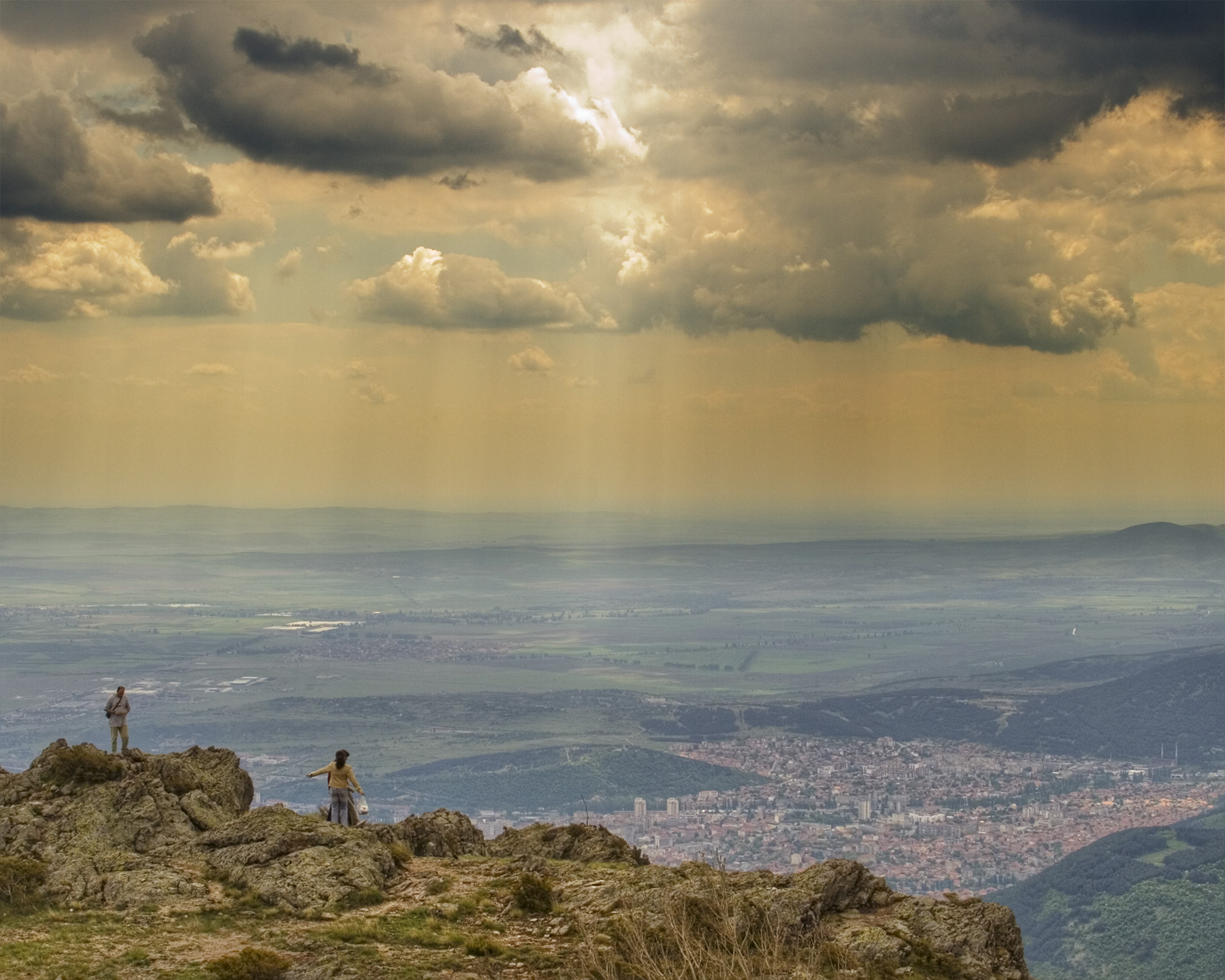
- А view of the valley from the Balkan Mountains
- Interactive map of Sliven Valley
- Coordinates: 42°39′26″N 26°18′58″E
- Location: Bulgaria

Area
  - Total: 830 km^{2} (320 sq mi)

Dimensions
  - Length: 70 km (43 mi)
  - Width: 15 km (9.3 mi)

Sliven Valley (Bulgarian: Сливенска котловина) is situated in eastern central Bulgaria. It is named after the city of Sliven, its main settlement. It is the ninth of the eleven Sub-Balkan valleys in direction west–east and is the second largest of them, after the Sofia Valley.

== Geography ==
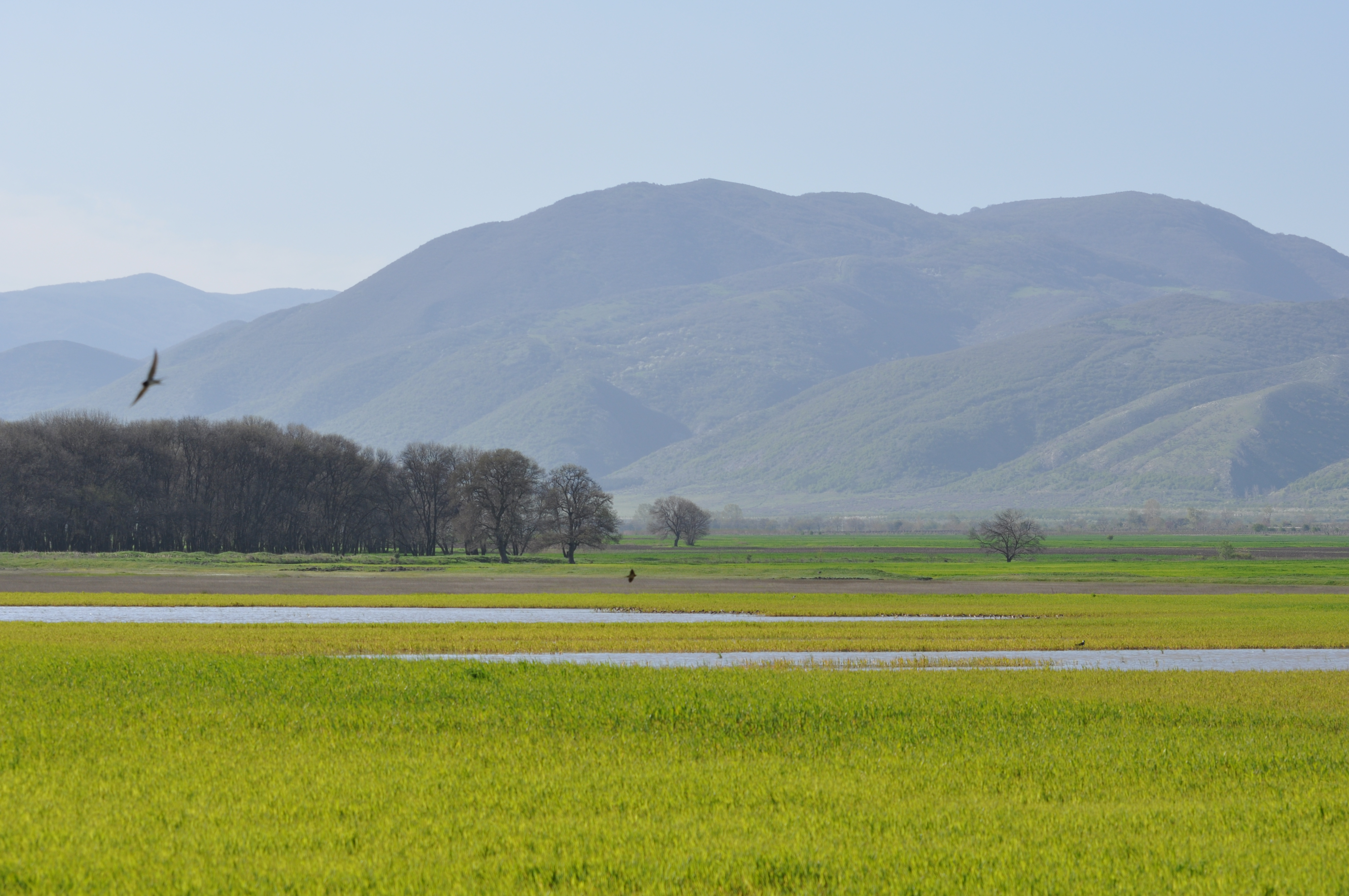
The Balkan Mountains seen from a marshy area in the Sliven Valley

The valley is enclosed between the Balkan Mountains to the north and the Sredna Gora mountain range and the heights of Bakadzhitsite and Hisar to the south. The Shivachevski Ridge separates it from the higher Tvarditsa Valley to the west, while the Terzijski Ridge of the Balkan Mountains and the Hisar Heights form the divide with the Karnobat Valley to the northeast. The northern slopes are part of Sinite Kamani Nature Park.

It spans a territory of 830 km^{2} and is thus the second largest of the Sub-Balkan valley by area. It reaches a length of 70 km in direction west–east and is 15 km at its widest. The average altitude is 150 m and is inclined in southern direction. It is divided in two parts by the heights of Hamambair, the higher Sliven field to the west and the partially marshy Straldzha field to the east.

Along its northern slopes there are many alluvial fans formed by the rivers streaming from the Balkan Mountains. The valley is a one-sided graben filled with Tertiary and Quaternary sediments with depth of 150 m to 500 m. There are mineral springs at Slivenski Mineralni Bani. The soils are mostly alluvial and cinnamon. The Sliven Valley is in the transitional zone between the temperate continental climatic zone and the continental Mediterranean zone, with typical for the region northern winds.

The valley is drained by the river Tundzha of the Aegean Sea basin and several of its left tributaries, including the Asenovska reka, the Sotirska reka and the Mochuritsa.

== Settlements ==
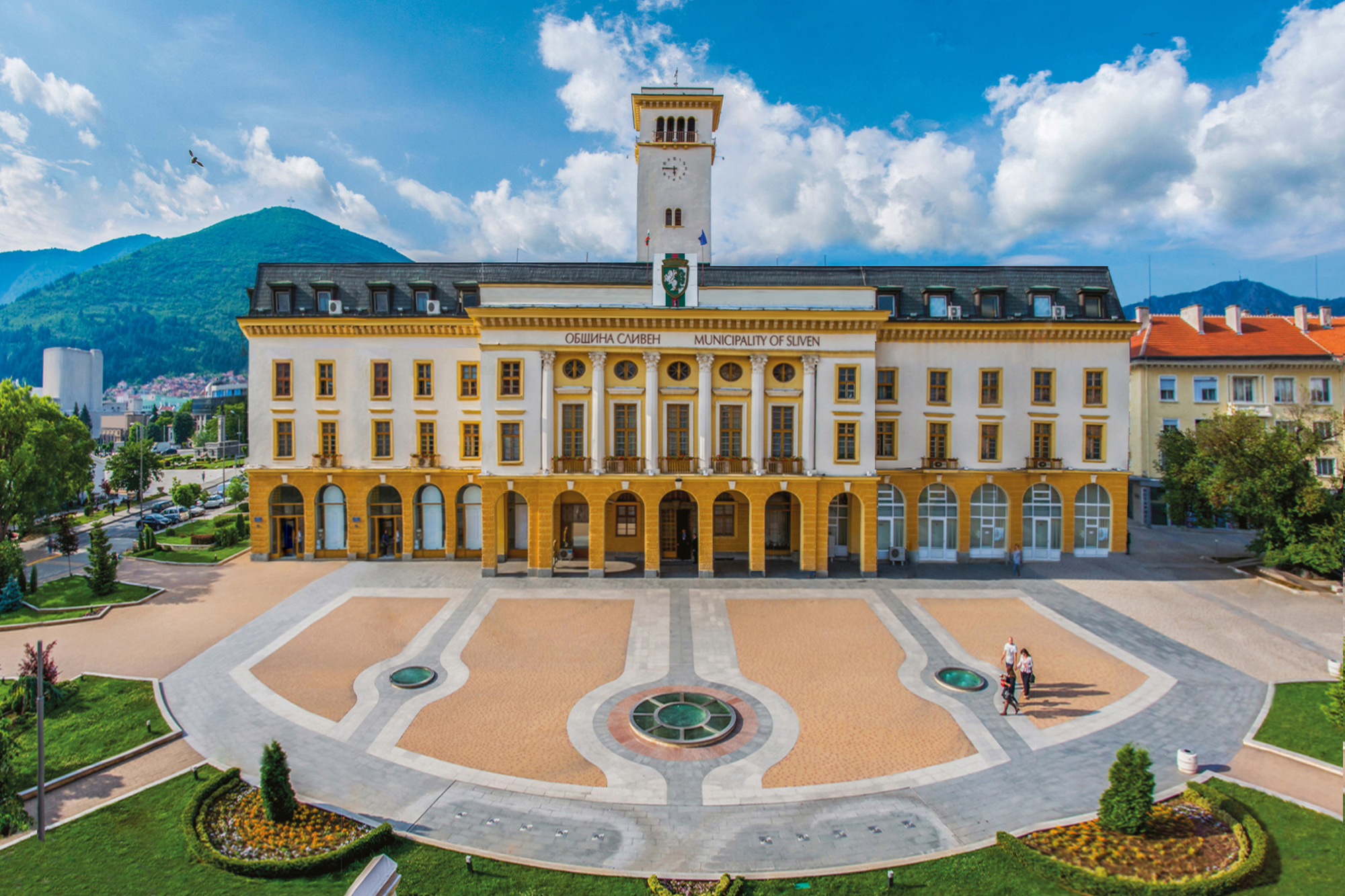
The City of Hall of Sliven

Administratively, the Sliven Valley falls in Burgas, Sliven and Yambol Provinces. There are one city, one town and 42 villages. In Sliven Province are located the city of Sliven and the villages of Blatets, Gavrailovo, Gergevets, Glufishevo, Glushnik, Gorno Aleksandrovo, Dragodanovo, Zhelyu Voyvoda, Zlati Voyvoda, Kaloyanovo, Kamen, Kovachite, Krushare, Malko Chochoveni, Mechkarevo, Panaretovtsi, Samoilovo, Selimovo, Sotirya, Strupets, Topolchane, Trapoklovo, Chintulovo and Chokoba. All of them are part of Sliven Municipality. Sliven is the eighth largest city in Bulgaria.

In Yambol Province there are one town and 14 villages. In Straldzha Municipality are located the town of Straldzha and the villages of Atolovo, Vodenichane, Dzhinot, Zimnitsa, Lozenets, Malenovo, Palauzovo and Charda. In Tundzha Municipality are situated Veselinovo, Drazhevo, Zavoy, Kabile, Mogila and Hadzhidimitrovo.

In Burgas Province, Karnobat Municipality are located four villages — Venets, Devetak, Devetintsi and Tserkovski.

== Transportation and economy ==
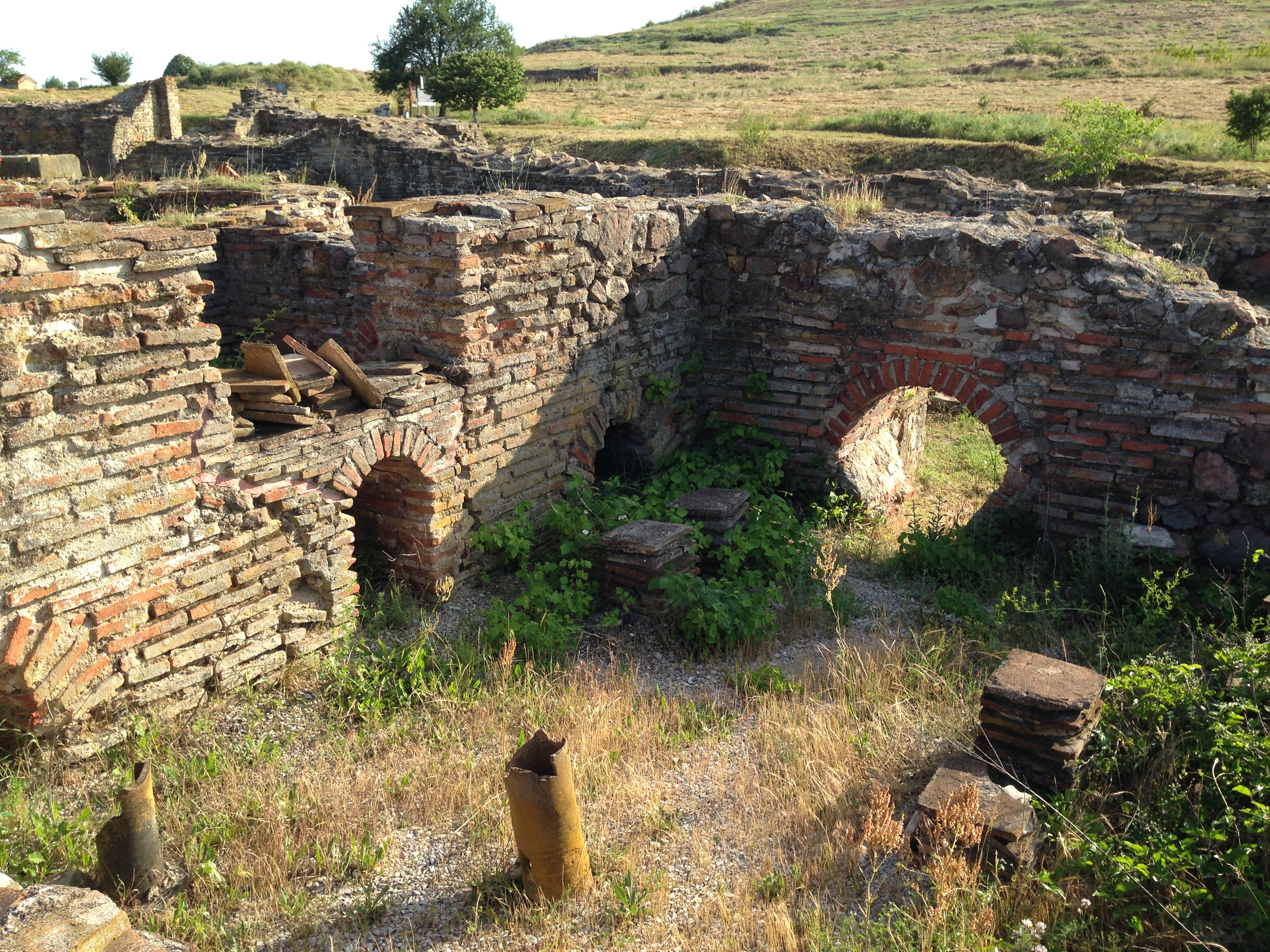
The ruins of Kabile

The valley is served by six roads of the national network, as well as local roads. In the southernmost reaches passes a section of the Trakia motorway. From west to east from the village of Binkos to the river Mochuritsa it is traversed by a 69.4 km stretch of the first class I-6 road Gyueshevo–Sofia–Karlovo–Burgas. From north to south between the Petolachakata junction and the village of Mogila passes a 21.2 km section of the first class I-7 road Silistra–Shumen–Yambol–Lesovo. In the central parts of the valley in direction northwest–southeast is a 18 km section of the second class II-53 road Polikraishte–Sliven–Yambol–Sredets. To the west in direction southwest–northeast between Sliven and Zlati Voyvoda runs a 14 km stretch of the second class II-66 road Sliven–Stara Zagora–Popovitsa. From north to south in its eastern reaches is a 15.8 km section of the third class III-707 road Petolachakata–Aleksandrovo–Golyamo Krushevo.

A section of railway line No. 3 Iliyantsi (Sofia)–Karlovo–Sliven–Karnobat–Varna served by the Bulgarian State Railways crosses the valley in direction west–east between the railway stations of Binkos and Tserkovski. The valley is also traversed by a section of railway line No. 8 Plovdiv–Stara Zagora–Yambol–Karnobat–Burgas. The two lines merge at the station of Zimnitsa.

The valley's economic hub is the city of Sliven, which has longstanding industrial traditions. The first modern factory on the territory of Bulgaria was established there in 1834 by the industrialist Dobri Zhelyazkov, producing textiles. The importance of textiles in local industry has somewhat declined in the 21st century and machine building is the most important sector. Sliven produces metal cutting machines, turning machines, column drilling machines, woodworking machines, etc. The Japanese company Yazaki has a cable factory that produces electronic components for automotive industry. There are favourable conditions for agriculture, in particular orchards, vineyards and industrial crops.

In the southernmost reaches of the valley, on the foothills the easternmost heights of Sredna Gora near the village of Kabile are the ruins of the ancient Thracian city of Cabyle, which was among the largest and most important settlements in ancient Thrace. The foundations of the defensive walls, the agora, temples, churches, baths, barracks and public buildings have been excavated. In 1969 the site was declared an archaeological reserve and is one of the 100 Tourist Sites of Bulgaria.

== Sources ==
- Мичев (Michev), Николай (Nikolay); Михайлов (Mihaylov), Цветко (Tsvetko); Вапцаров (Vaptsarov), Иван (Ivan); Кираджиев (Kiradzhiev), Светлин (Svetlin) (1980). Географски речник на България [Geographic Dictionary of Bulgaria] (in Bulgarian). София (Sofia): Наука и култура (Nauka i kultura).
