= Gorna Vasilitsa =

Gorna Vasilitsa Горна Василица
- Village
- Location of Gorna Vasilitsa
- Coordinates: 42°20′52″N 23°51′10″E
- Country: Bulgaria
- Province (Oblast): Sofia
- Municipality: Kostenets

Government
  - Mayor: Radostin Radev

Population (2010-12-15)
  - Total: 273
- Time zone: UTC+2 (EET)
  - Summer (DST): UTC+3 (EEST)
- Postal Code: 2046
- Area code: 07142

Gorna Vasilitsa (Bulgarian: Горна Василица) is a village in Sofia Province in southwestern Bulgaria, located in the Kostenets Municipality. In it situated in the Kostenets–Dolna Banya Valley enclosed between the mountain ranges of Rila and Sredna Gora. As of the 2010 census, the village had a total population of 273. The settlement contains many villa-type properties used as holiday homes and weekend getaways. An increasing number of foreigners are finding that house prices here are well below those in other "sun-trap" countries of southern Europe.

== Religion ==
Bulgarian Eastern Orthodox is the predominant religion.

== Gallery ==
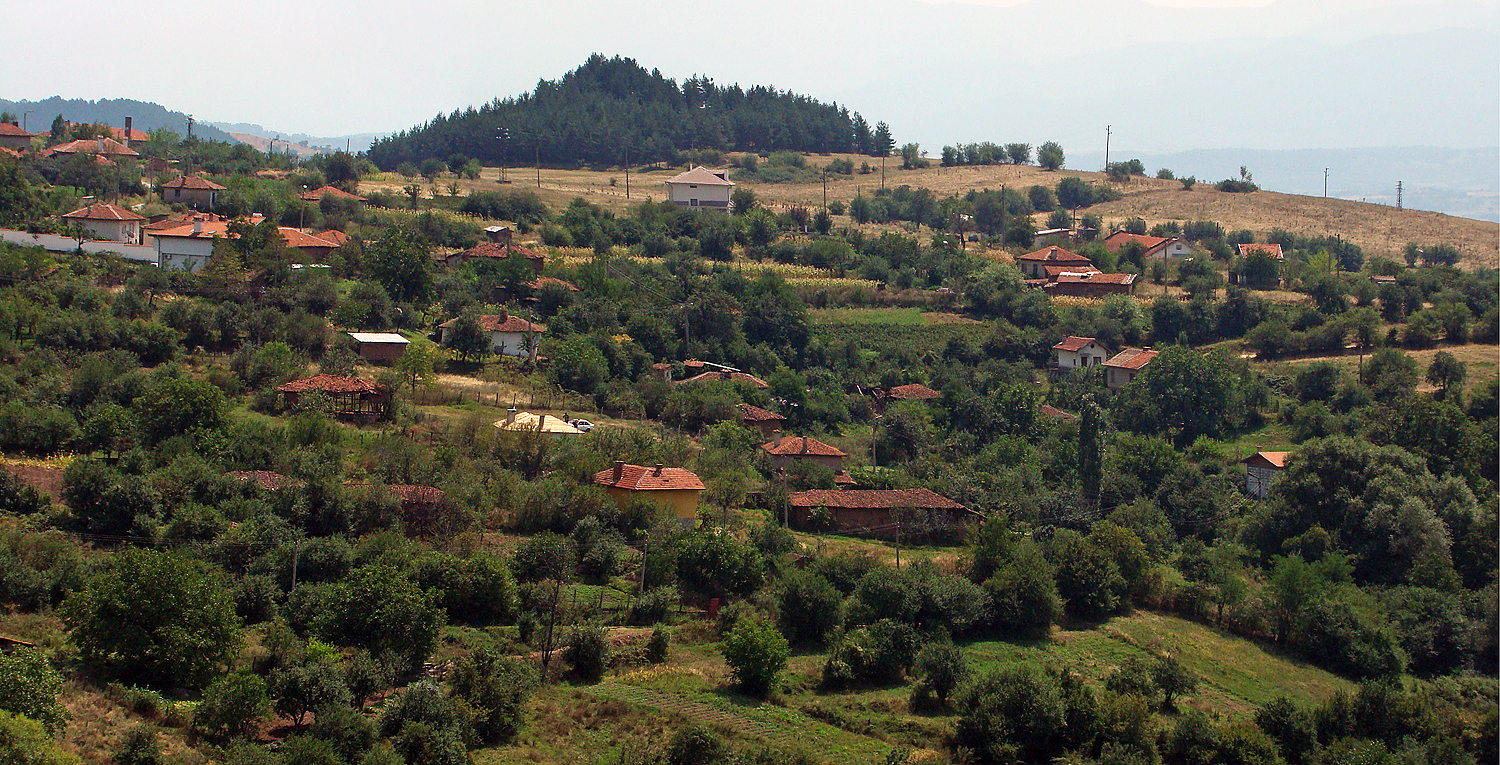
Mahala Gorna Vasilitsa

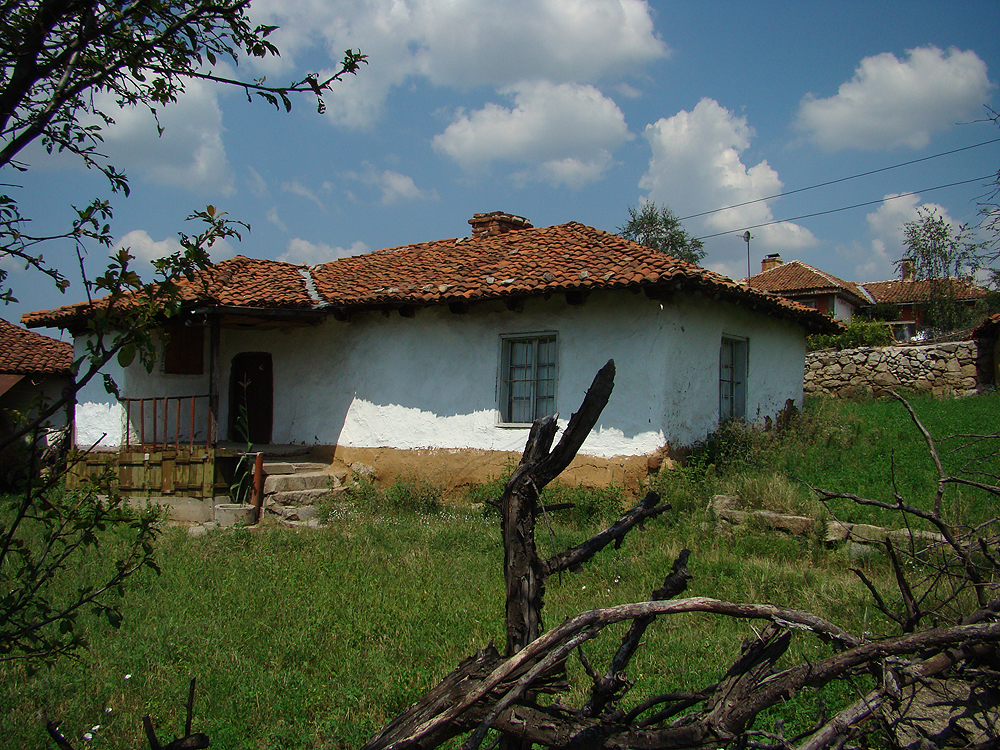
Old House

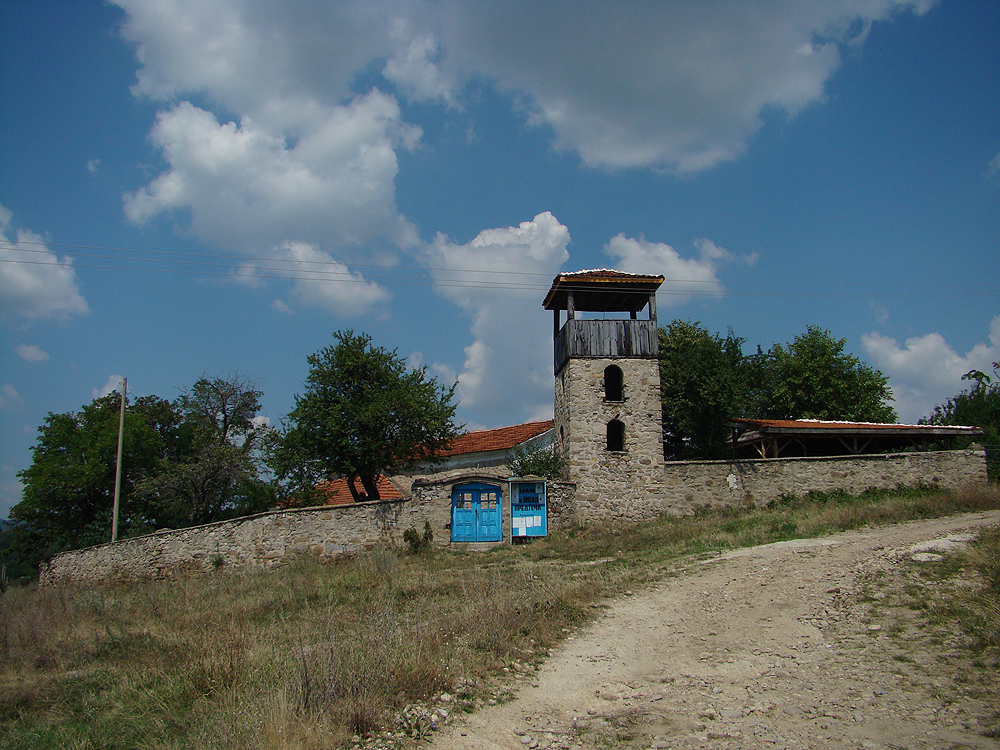
The Church Gorna Vasilitsa: Saint John the Baptist

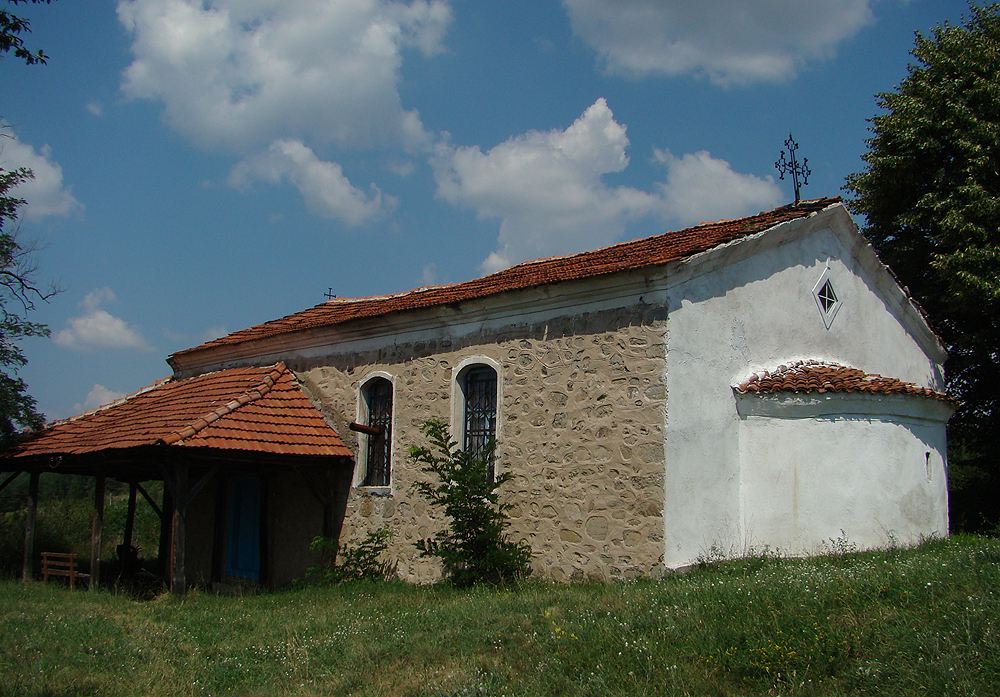
The Church Gorna Vasilitsa: Saint John the Baptist

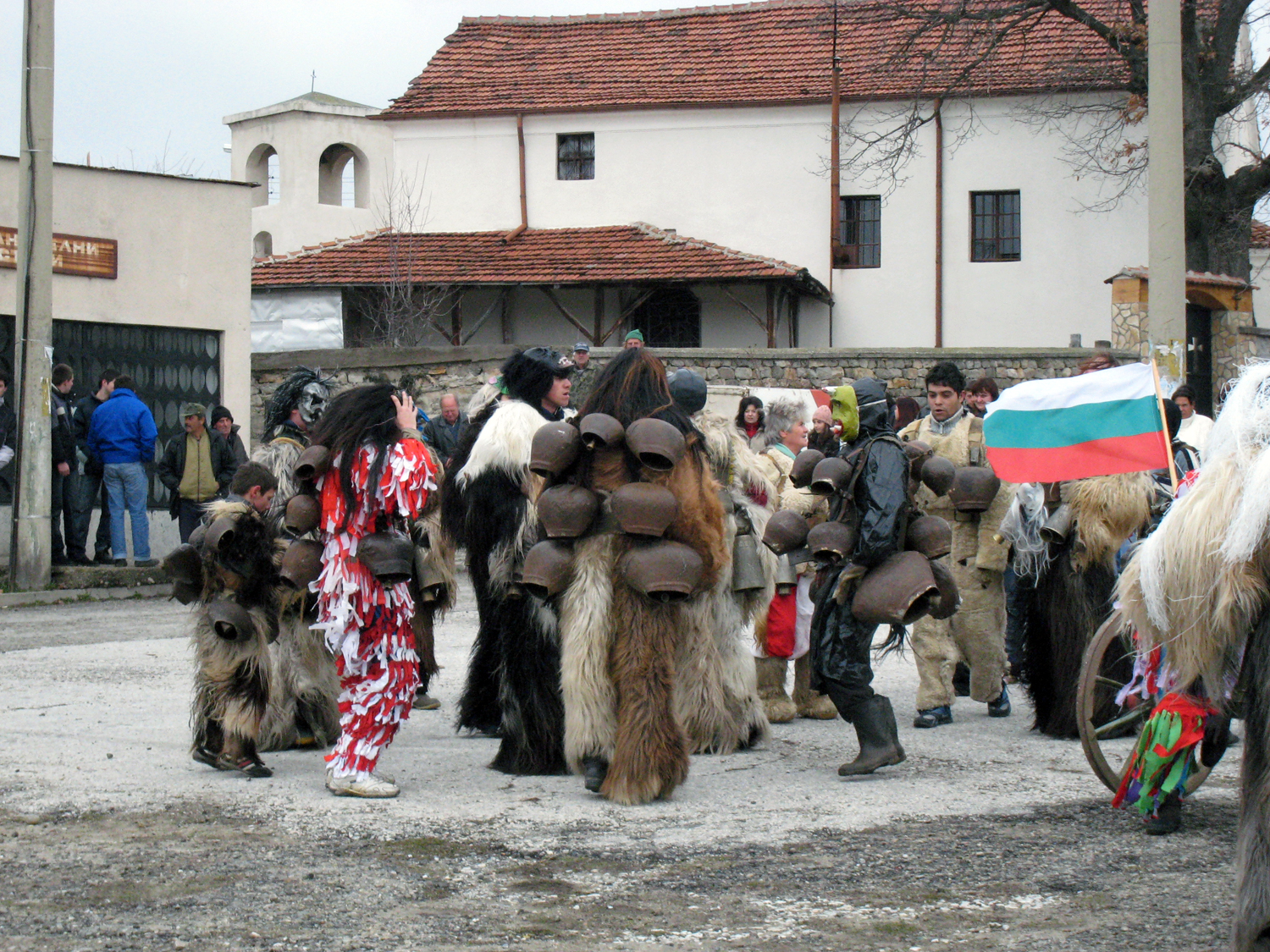
Kukeri from Gorna Vasilitsa
