= Dolna Banya =

Dolna Banya Долна баня
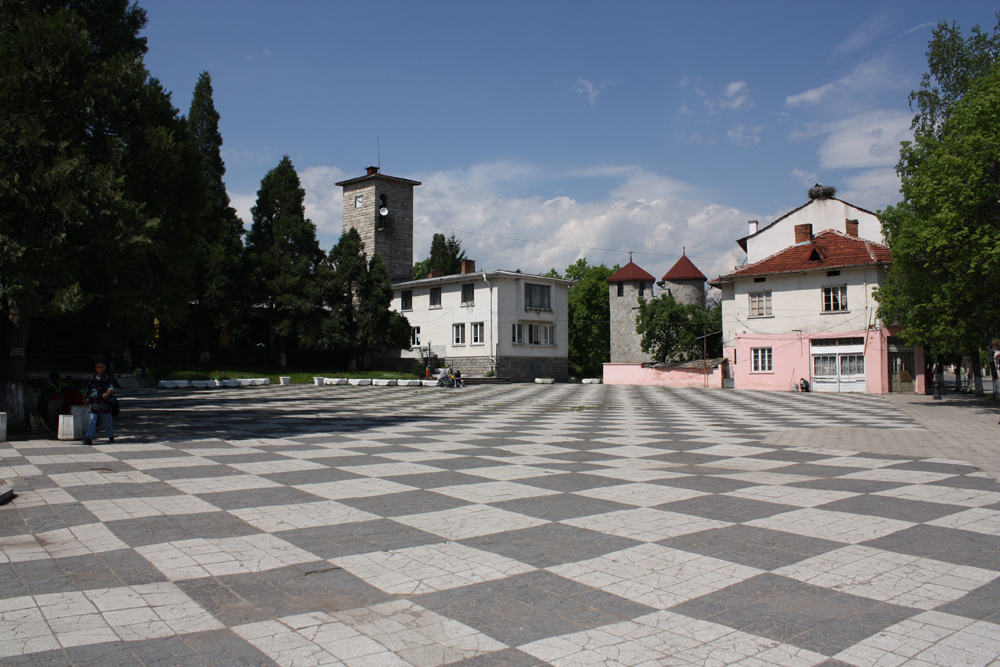
- Dolna Banya square with the clock-tower and the Library

- Location of Dolna banya
- Coordinates: 42°17′N 23°46′E
- Country: Bulgaria
- Provinces (Oblast): Sofia

Government
- Elevation: 643 m (2,110 ft)

Population (13.09.2005)
  - Total: 5,667
- Time zone: UTC+2 (EET)
  - Summer (DST): UTC+3 (EEST)
- Postal Code: 2040
- Area code: 07120

Dolna Banya, also Dolna Banja or Dolna Bania (Bulgarian: Долна баня) is a town located in Sofia Province in southwestern Bulgaria. 75 km from Sofia and Plovdiv, Dolna Banya is located in the Kostenets–Dolna Banya Valley by the north-eastern slopes of the Rila Mountains, 18 and 30 km respectively from the ski resorts of Borovets and Samokov. Dolna Banya is a resort town, known for its hot mineral waters, with temperatures of 56.3 C. The area surrounding the town is largely agricultural, and there are skiing and hiking trails in the nearby mountains.

Dolna Banya is a small, lively town. The square has a vegetable market, bakery, and two bars. The inside of the town's Bulgarian Orthodox church is covered in murals, and the churchyard located next to a stream. The local stadium is named Vasil Levski, a tribute to the leader of Bulgaria's liberation from the Ottoman Empire and the national stadium of the same name in Sofia.

Dolna Banya is accessible by road, and a daily bus runs from the Sofia bus depot through other villages in the area. However, buses run more frequently from Sofia to Kostenets (8 km from Dolna Banya). From Kostenets transportation is available every 30 minutes to Dolna Banya. Trains also run about every hour between Sofia and Kostenets.

In June 2005, Ibar Golf Club announced that a 20m Euro golf course would be constructed in Dolna Banya. Construction began in the fall of 2005 and is set for completion in 2007. It is expected to be the only golf course in Eastern Europe to meet PGA standards.

== Demography ==
According to the 2011 census, Dolna Banya has 4,522 inhabitants.

=== Ethnic groups ===
Most inhabitants are ethnic Bulgarians (81.7%), followed by a large Roma minority (17.6%).

=== Education ===
The city provides its inhabitants, and those of the surrounding villages, education through two municipal schools. Neofit Rilski is an elementary, middle and a high school that, as of 2019–20, has over 420 students. It was founded in 1851 with just a single class of students and a single teacher. The core of the current edifice was built in 1879, shortly after the Liberation of Bulgaria, and was later expanded as the number of classes grew.

Hristo Botev is a vocational high school in Dolna Banya. As of 2019–20, the school has about 100 students.Thе school was founded in 1925, and currently offers courses related to the hospitality industry, as well as a woodworking and sewing courses.

In Dolna Banya, there is also a kindergarten named after the cosmonaut Yuri Gagarin.

=== Religion ===
According to the latest Bulgarian census of 2011, the religious composition, among those who answered the optional question on religious identification, was the following:

Religious composition of Dolna Banya Municipality
Orthodox Christianity	88.3%
Catholicism	0.4%
Protestantism	7.6%
Islam	0.2%
No religion	1.4%
Prefer not to answer, others and indefinable	2.1%

Most inhabitants belong to the Bulgarian Orthodox Church (88%). There is also a very large Protestant minority (8%), especially part of the ethnic Roma people. There are two major temples in Dolna Banya - an Orthodox Christian church and an Evangelical church.

== Gallery ==
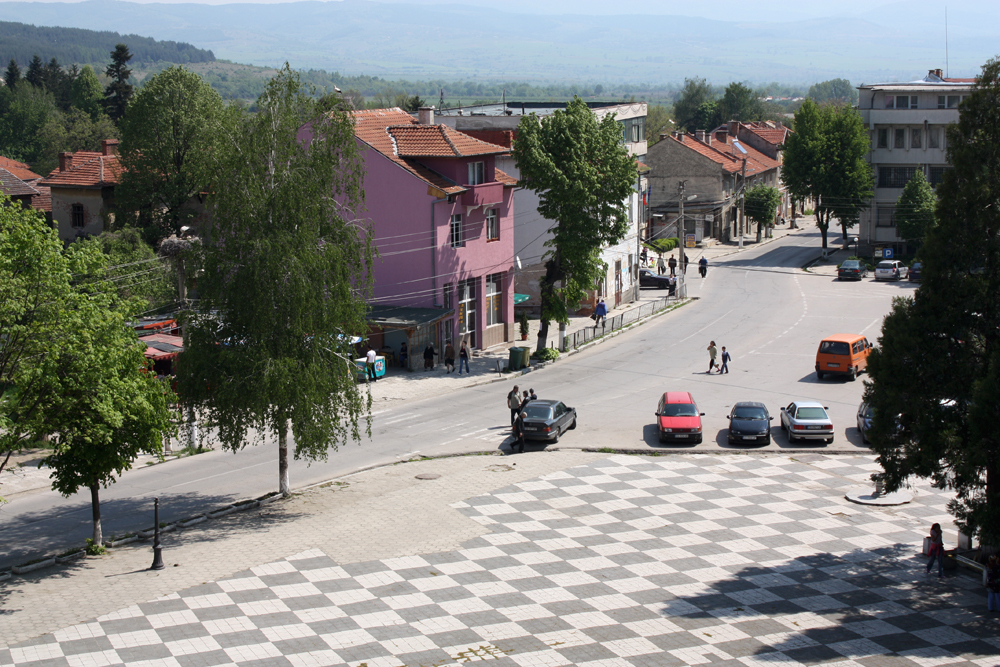
Main square - view from the town clock-tower

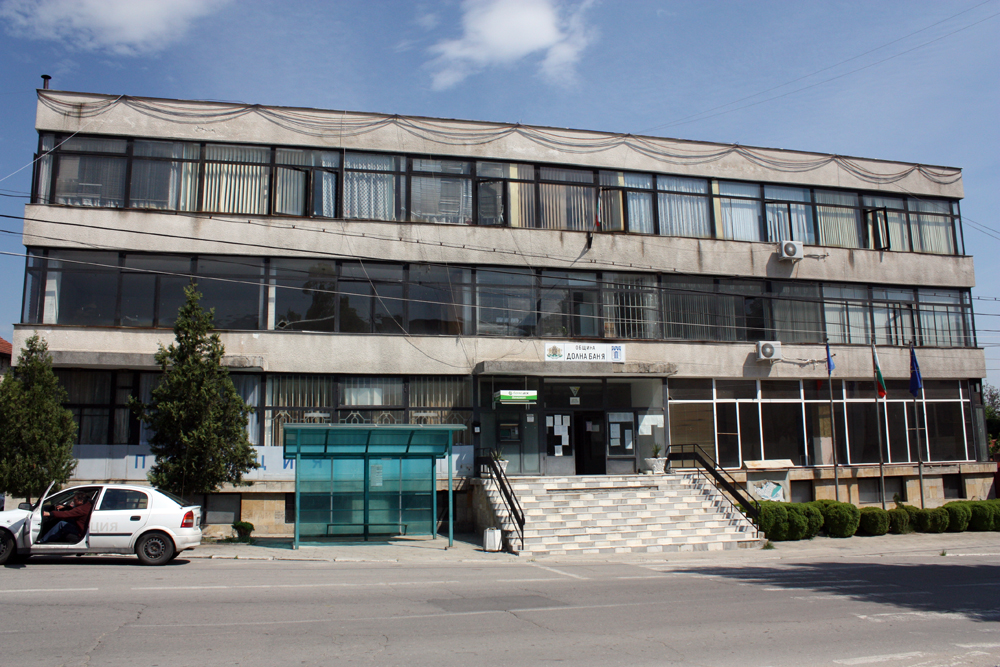
Dolna Banya Municipality Hall

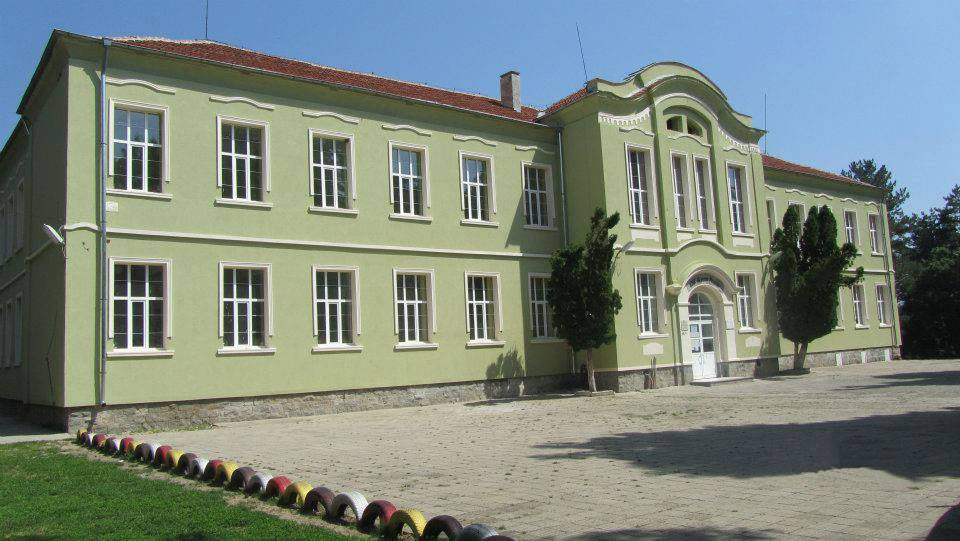
Neofit Rilski School in summer, 2014.

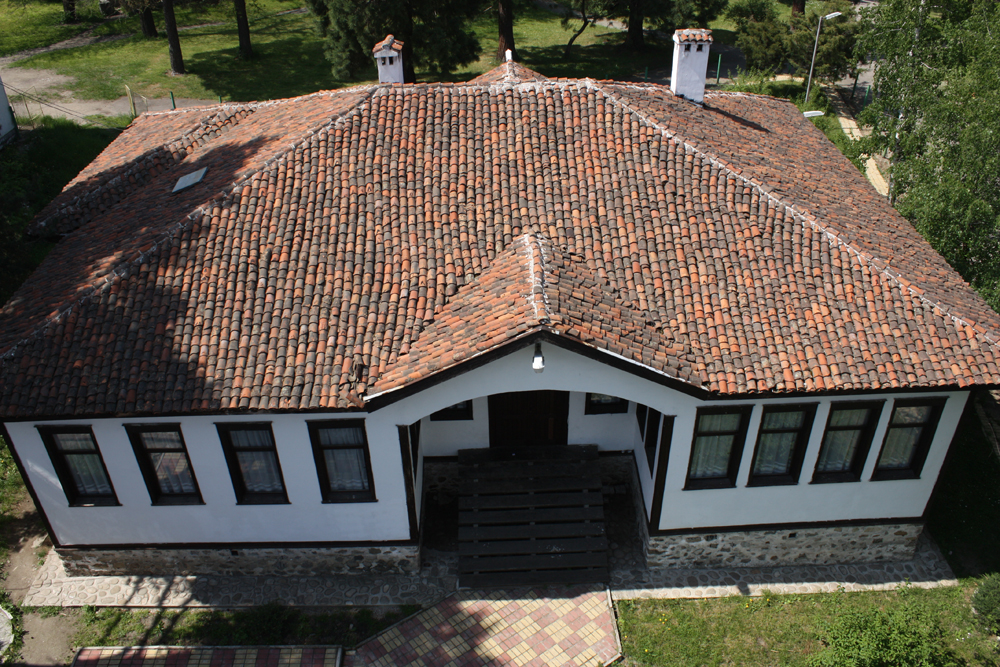
Dolna Banya Museum (view from the clock-tower)

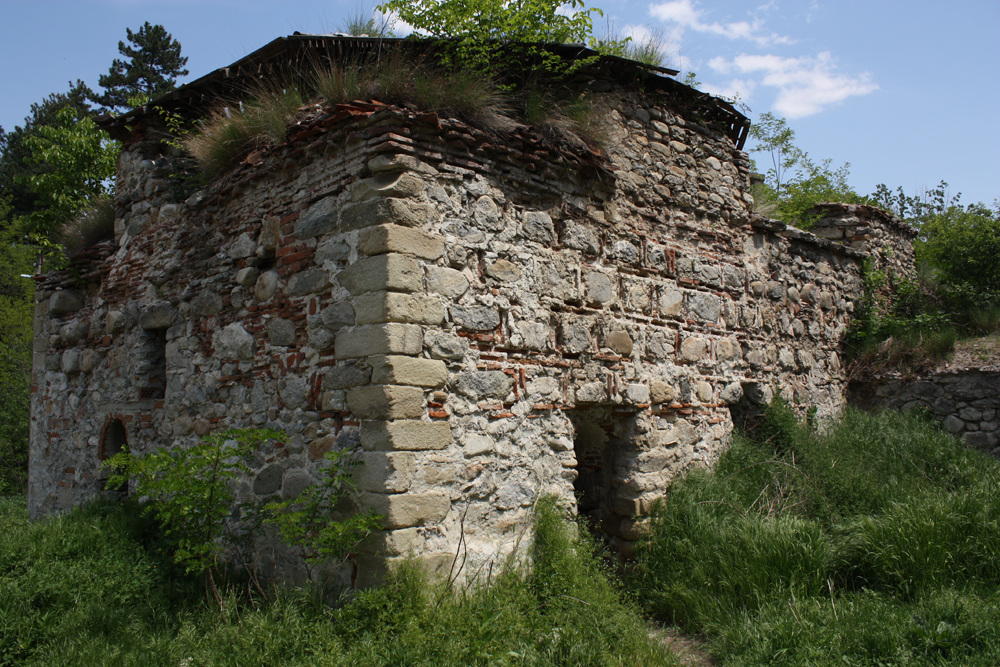
The old bath, built around 1700 on top of Ancient Roman ruins
