= II-66 road (Bulgaria) =

Road in Bulgaria

Republic Road I-66
- Републикански път I-66

Route information
- Length: 127.6 km (79.3 mi)

Major junctions
- From: Km 400.7 of I-6, near Sliven
- To: Km 253.1 of I-8, Plovdiv

Location
- Country: Bulgaria
- Towns: Sliven, Nova Zagora, Stara Zagora, Chirpan

Highway system
- Highways in Bulgaria

Republican Road II-66 (Bulgarian: Републикански път II-66) is a 2nd class road in Bulgaria, running in general direction northeast–southwest through the territory of Sliven, Stara Zagora and Plovdiv Provinces. Its length is 127.6 km.

== Route description ==
The road starts at Km 400.7 of the first class I-6 road southwest of the city of Sliven and heads southwest through the Sliven Valley. At its Km 4 it crosses the river Tundzha and passes through the spa resort of Slivenski Mineralni Bani and the village of Zlati Voyvoda. The road then crosses the eastern reaches of the Sredna Gora mountain range and at the village of Kamenovo it enters the northeasternmost past of the Upper Thracian Plain. In the lowlands the II-66 passes through Kamenovo, Sadievo and the town of Nova Zagora, enters Stara Zagora Province, runs through the village of Podslon and reaches the city of Stara Zagora from the east. It bypasses the city from the southeast and south and at the village of Bogomilovo it heads southwest and enters the eastern low areas of the Chirpan Heights. The road goes through the village of Rakitnitsa, bypasses the town of Chirpan from the southeast, south and southwest, and continues westwards. It passes through Plodovitovo and Mirovo, crosses the river Maritsa and enters Plovdiv Province. There the road passes through Milevo and in the southeastern neighbourhoods of the village of Popovitsa reaches its terminus at Km 253.1 of the first class I-8 road.
