= Atolovo =

Atolovo Атолово
- Location of Atolovo, Bulgaria
- Coordinates: 42°36′N 26°45′E
- Country: Bulgaria
- Provinces (Oblast): Yambol Province

Government
  - Mayor: Rositsa Dankova
- Elevation: 128 m (420 ft)

Population (2022)
  - Total: 219
- Time zone: UTC+2 (EET)
  - Summer (DST): UTC+3 (EEST)
- Postal Code: 8683
- Area codes: 04761 from Bulgaria, 003594761 from outside

Atolovo (Bulgarian: Атолово, from the Bulgarian transliteration of Atholl and the Slavic toponymic suffix "-ovo") is a village in southeastern Bulgaria, part of Straldzha Municipality, Yambol Province. As of 2022, it has a population of 219. Atolovo lies at 128 m above sea level, in the Straldzha Plateau of the Sliven Valley.

The village, intended for ethnic Bulgarian refugees from Greek Macedonia and Eastern Thrace, was officially established in 1926 with the support of the British organization Save the Children and the financial aid of the 8th Duke of Atholl. Tsar Boris III of Bulgaria attended the official ceremony. Atolovo was named in honour of the Duke after his death. During the Communist rule of Bulgaria, the village was briefly renamed Harizanovo, after a local guerrilla fighter, but the old name was shortly reinstated.

British volunteers helped construct houses for the refugees, as well as a cultural centre (chitalishte) and a church. Today, there is a monument to the Duke of Atholl in the village made by the sculptor Mincho Ognyanov.
