= Zlati Voyvoda =

Zlati Voyvoda Злати войвода
- Location of Zlati Voyvoda, Bulgaria
- Coordinates: 42°35′12.58″N 26°11′35.02″E
- Country: Bulgaria
- Provinces (Oblast): Sliven Province

Government
  - Mayor: Zlatomira Stoyanova
- Elevation: 207 m (679 ft)

Population (15.03.2024)
  - Total: 1,094
- Time zone: UTC+2 (EET)
  - Summer (DST): UTC+3 (EEST)
- Postal Code: 8875
- Area codes: 04511 from Bulgaria, 003594511 from outside

Zlati Voyvoda (Bulgarian: Злати войвода) is a village in central Bulgaria. It has a population of 1,094 as of 2024.

== Geography ==
Zlati Voyvoda is located in Sliven Province and has a territory of 23.358 km^{2}. It is part of Sliven Municipality. It is situated 18 km southwest of the municipal center Sliven and 47 km northeast of the city of Stara Zagora. The village lies on the second class II-66 road that connects Sliven, Nova Zagora, Stara Zagora and Chirpan.

Zlati Voyvoda is situated in the Sliven Valley, at the northern foothills of the easternmost low parts of the Sredna Gora mountain range. It lies about one kilometer south of the river Tundzha. On its territory some 5 km northeast in the direction of Sliven is situated the spa resort of Slivenski Mineralni Bani.

== Culture ==
The village school was established in 1873 and in 1879, one year after the Liberation of Bulgaria, a dedicated school building was constructed. The local chitalishte "Prosveta" was established in 1924.

== Economy ==
Zlati Voyvoda lies in a fertile agricultural area. There are orchards producing peaches and cherries. Other important crops include grain and vegetables. Livestock breeding is also developed, mainly sheep, pigs, cattle and goats. Part of the population is employed in the manufacturing industry of Sliven.
