= Slivenski Mineralni Bani =

Slivenski Mineralni Bani Сливенски минерални бани
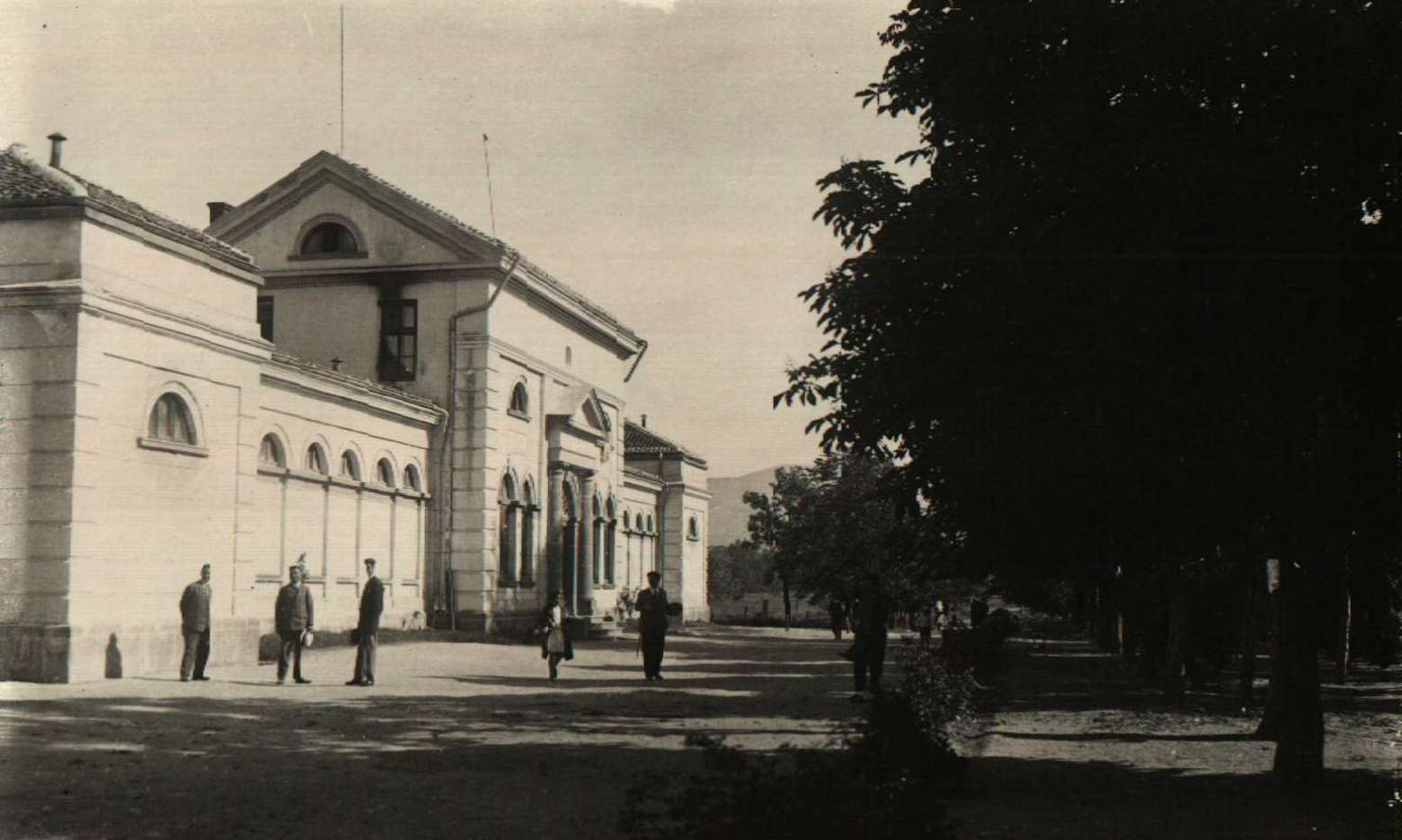
- Slivenski Mineralni Bani in the early 20th century

- Location of Slivenski Mineralni Bani, Bulgaria
- Coordinates: 42°36′37.68″N 26°13′57.24″E
- Country: Bulgaria
- Provinces (Oblast): Sliven Province

Slivenski Mineralni Bani (Bulgarian: Сливенски минерални бани) is a spa resort of national importance in central Bulgaria. It is located on the territory of the village of Zlati Voyvoda in Sliven Municipality, Sliven Province. It lies on the second class II-66 road 12 km southeast of Sliven and 5 km northeast of Zlati Voyvida. The administrative status is that of a settlement entity of local importance as per a 2006 decision of the Sliven Municipal Council.

== Geography ==
Slivenski Mineralni Bani is situated at an altitude of 245 m just south of the river Tundzha in the Sliven Valley between the Balkan Mountains and Sredna Gora. It is easily accessible via the first class I-6 and I-7 roads.

The climate is temperate continental with Mediterranean influence. Winter is moderately cold, summer is warm and autumn is long, sunny, dry and warmer than spring. The average temperature in January is in the range from −2 °C to 5 °C and in June — between 16 °C to 25 °C. The highest annual precipitation falls in May, reaching 171 mm.

== Mineral springs ==
The mineral springs at Slivenski Mineralni Bani are two and spring from highly cracked and calcined Triassic limestone, covered by Late Cretaceous marl and tuff. They were captured as early as 1898. In 1957, a 90 m-deep borehole was drilled, which discovered self-flowing thermal waters. Further drills were conducted in 1961. The mineral springs have a total discharge of 18 L/sec and temperature of 48 °С.

The water has low mineralization (1.986 g/L) and is slightly fluorine (4.2 mg fluorine per liter) with sodium, calcium-sulfate and hydrocarbonate. It contains 27 mg of colloidal metasilicic acid per liter, but has a neutral reaction (pH 6.8) due to CO_{2} content (287 mg/L). The water contains over 19 minerals and has a broad prophylactic and healing effect. It has a general strengthening and anti-inflammatory effect on the body, improves blood circulation and removes toxins. It is suitable for the treatment of diseases of the musculoskeletal system, the peripheral nervous system, gastrointestinal, biliary-hepatic and renal-urological diseases.
