= Kostenets Municipality =

Kostenets Municipality Община Костенец
- Municipality
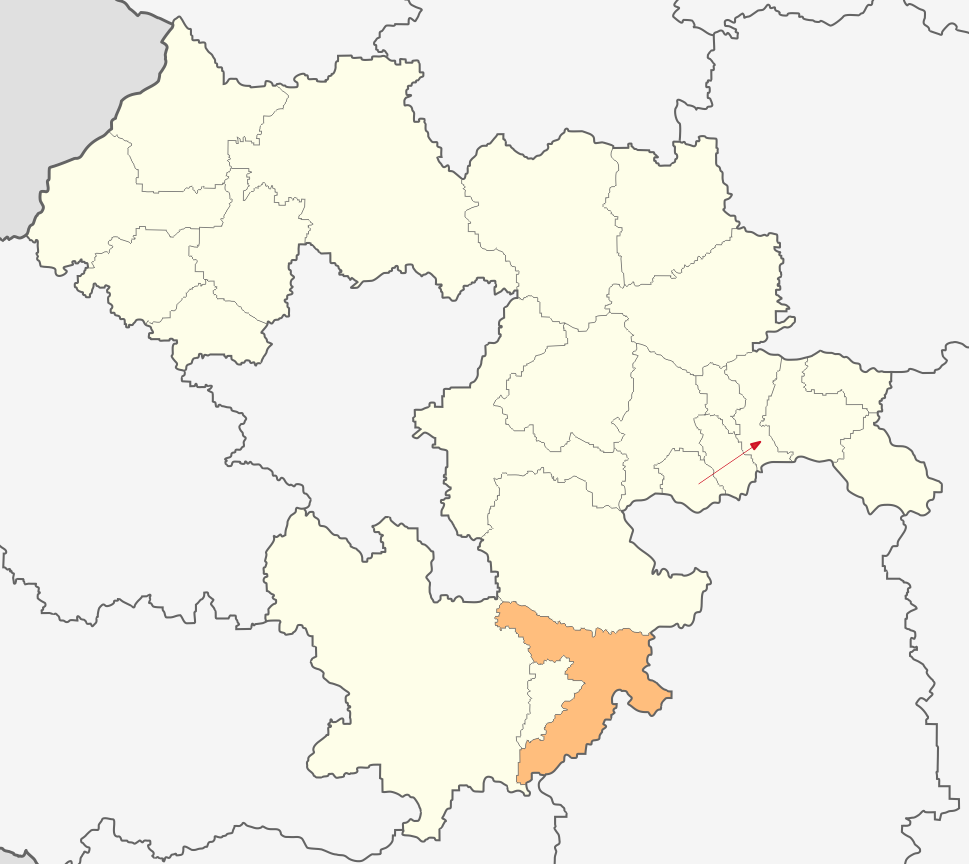

- Location of Kostenets (town)
- Coordinates: 42°19′N 23°50′E
- Country: Bulgaria
- Province (Oblast): Sofia

Area
  - Total: 302 km^{2} (117 sq mi)

Population (2009-03-15)
  - Total: 14,154
  - Density: 46.9/km^{2} (121/sq mi)
- Time zone: UTC+2 (EET)
  - Summer (DST): UTC+3 (EEST)

The Kostenets municipality (Bulgarian: Община Костенец) is one of the 22 municipalities of the Sofia Province, Bulgaria. The extent of the territory is 302 km^{2} and it had 14,154 inhabitants as of 2009. It encompasses the Valley of Gorna Banya, along the upper flow of the Maritsa river, surrounded by Rila to the south and Sredna Gora to the north. The region has many warm mineral springs in the spa resorts of Momin Prohod, Momina Banya, Kostenets and Pchelinski Bani. The municipality has an important transport location with the Trakiya motorway, the first class road Sofia-Plovdiv and the Sofia-Plovdiv railway passing through it.

== Settlements ==
The municipality has nine settlements (2 towns and 7 villages) with a total population of 14,154 people (as of 2009-03-15)

The place names in bold have the status of town (in Bulgarian: град, transliterated as grad). Other localities have the status of village (in Bulgarian: село, transliterated as selo). The names of localities are transliterated in Latin alphabet, followed in parentheses by the original name in Bulgarian Cyrillic alphabet (which links to the corresponding Bulgarian Wikipedia article).

Town/Village	Cyrillic	Pop.
Dolna Vasilitsa	Долна Василица	n/a
Golak	Голак	2
Gorna Vasilitsa	Горна Василица	257
**Kostenets** (town)	Костенец (град)	7,762
Kostenets (village)	Костенец (село)	4,025
**Momin Prohod**	Момин проход	1,788
Ochusha	Очуша	31
Pchelin	Пчелин	274
Podgorie	Подгорие	15
**TOTAL**		**14,154**

== Demography ==
=== Religion ===
According to the latest Bulgarian census of 2011, the religious composition, among those who answered the optional question on religious identification, was the following:

Religious composition of Kostenets Municipality
Orthodox Christianity	90.7%
Catholicism	0.1%
Protestantism	2.5%
Islam	0.1%
No religion	2.4%
Prefer not to answer, others and indefinable	4.2%
