= Kostenets (village) =

Kostenets Костенец
- Village
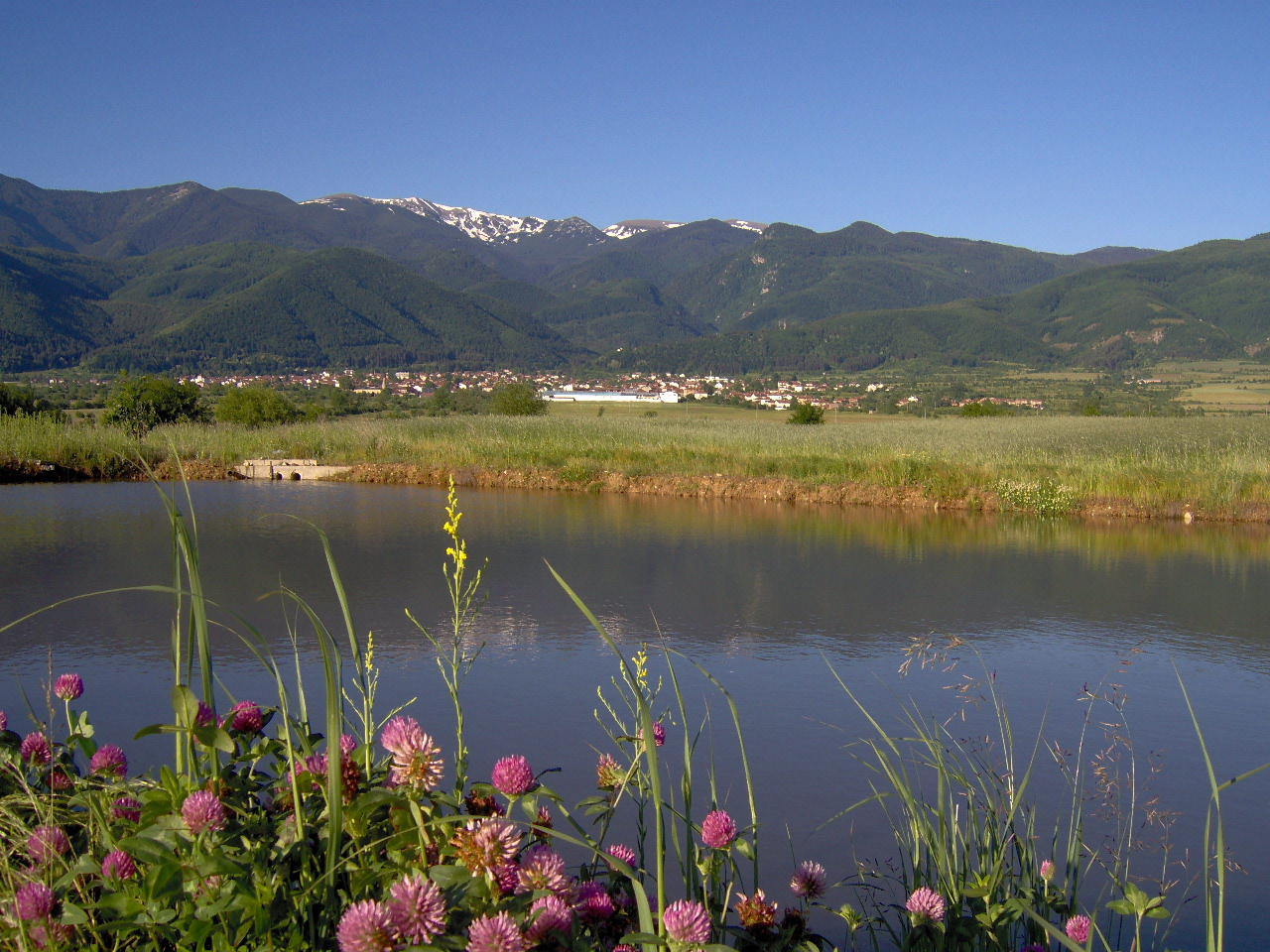
- Kostenets and the Rila mountain

- Location of Kostenets within Bulgaria
- Coordinates: 42°16′N 23°49′E
- Country: Bulgaria
- Province: Sofia
- Municipality: Kostenets

Government
  - Mayor: Georgi Anchin (NDSV)

Area
  - Total: 109,381 km^{2} (42,232 sq mi)
- Elevation: 689 m (2,260 ft)

Population (2024)
  - Total: 3,138
  - Density: 0.02869/km^{2} (0.07430/sq mi)
- Time zone: UTC+2 (EET)
  - Summer (DST): UTC+3 (EEST)
- Postal Code: 2042
- Area code: 07144

Kostenets (Bulgarian: Костенец) is a village in the Sofia Province southwestern Bulgaria, located in the Kostenets Municipality (which also has a separate town of Kostenets). As of the 2024 census, the village had a total population of 3,138. It ranks 18th by population of all Bulgarian villages.

== Geography ==
Kostenets is located at the foot of the Rila mountain, 63 kilometers southeast of Sofia, about 6 kilometers south of the town of Kostenets and 35 kilometers east of Borovets. Its altitude ranges from 650 meters in the northern part to 725 meters in the southern part.

== History ==
It is assumed that the area was originally settled by the Thracian tribe Bessi around 2nd century BC. The settlement was the first one in today's Kostenets municipality. During an archaeological study of the "Gorna cherkva" area were found remains of an old fortress and the footprints of an old Christian basilica from the 5th century as well as ancient pottery, Roman, Byzantine and medieval Bulgarian coins.

== Cultural and natural landmarks ==
- Kostenets waterfall, located about 3 km south of the village and described by Ivan Vazov.
- The nearby historic mountain pass Gate of Trajan.

== Gallery ==
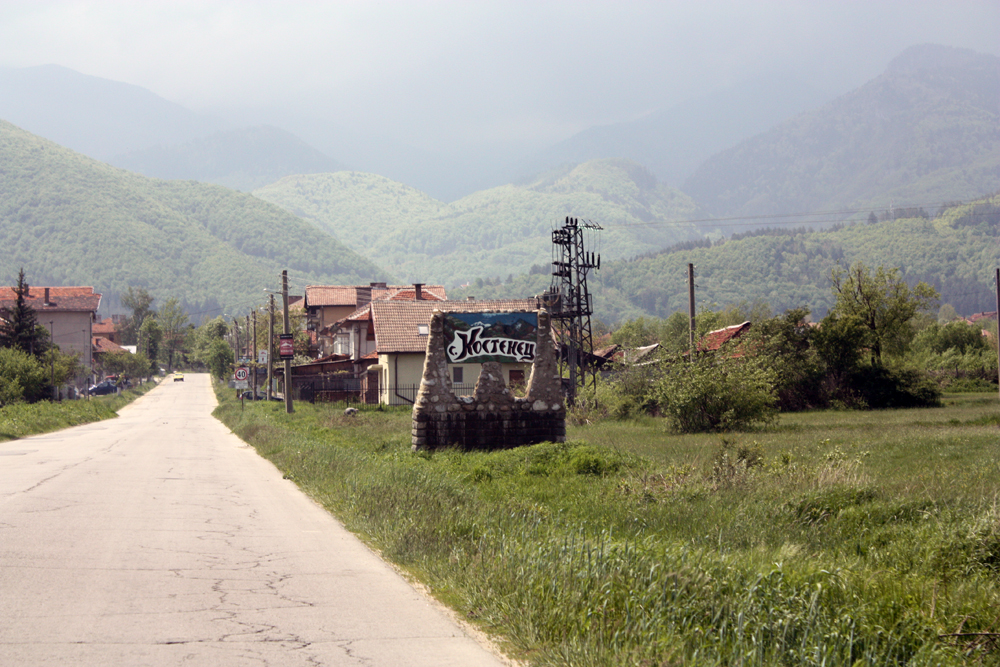
Entrance road to Kostenets

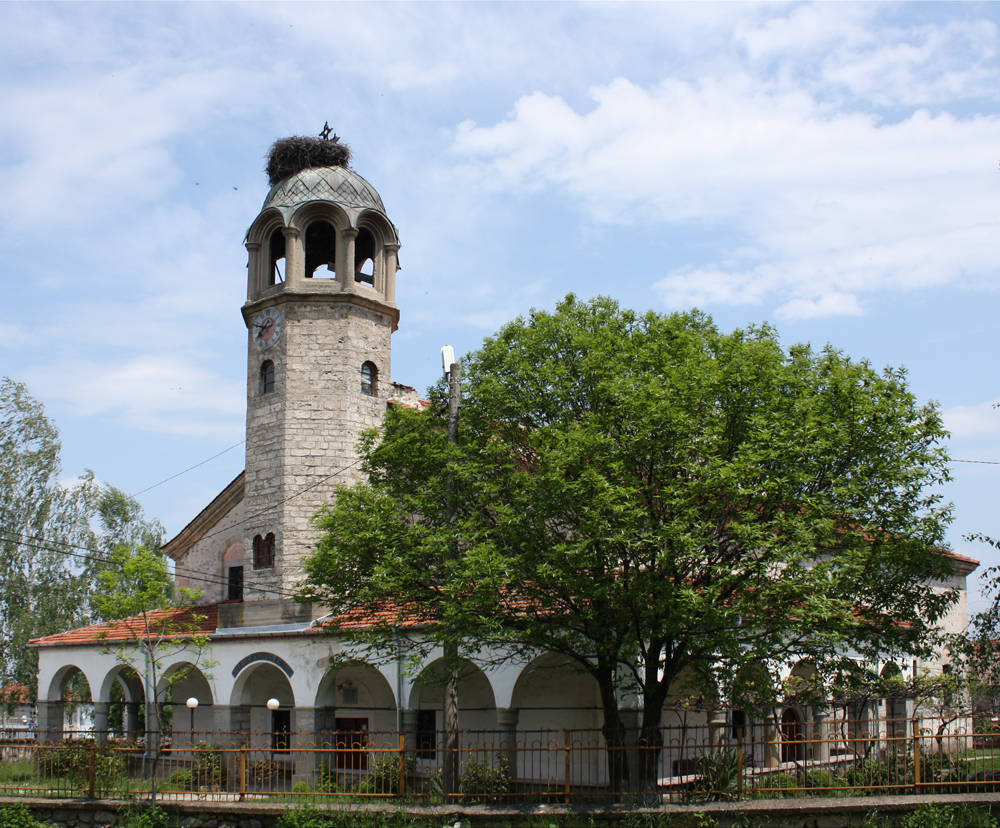
The Archangel Michael Church (Built 1857) in Kostenets village

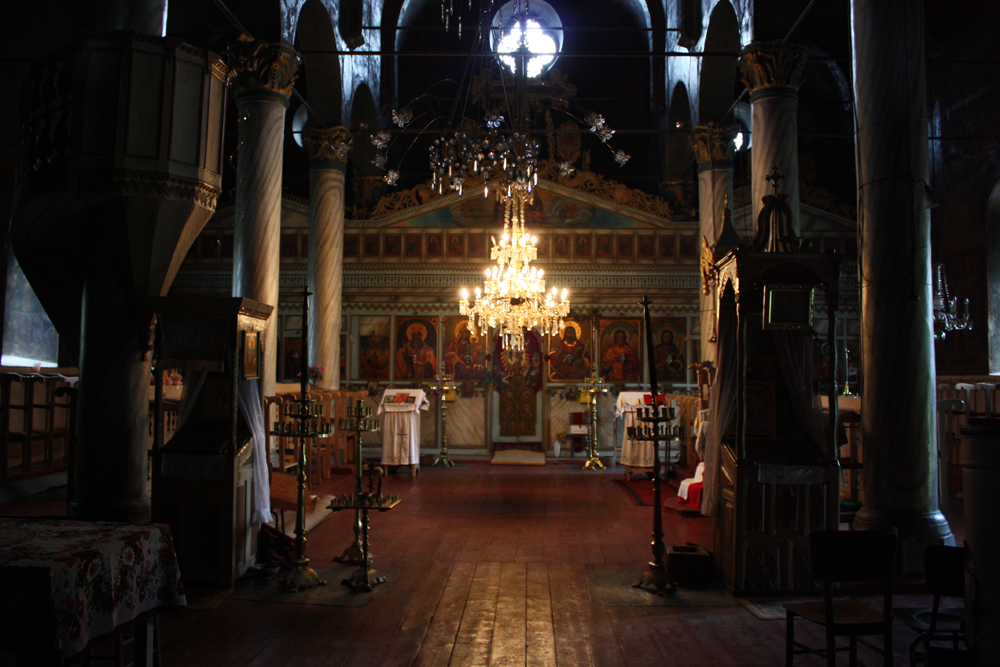
The interior of Archangel Michael church in Kostenets village

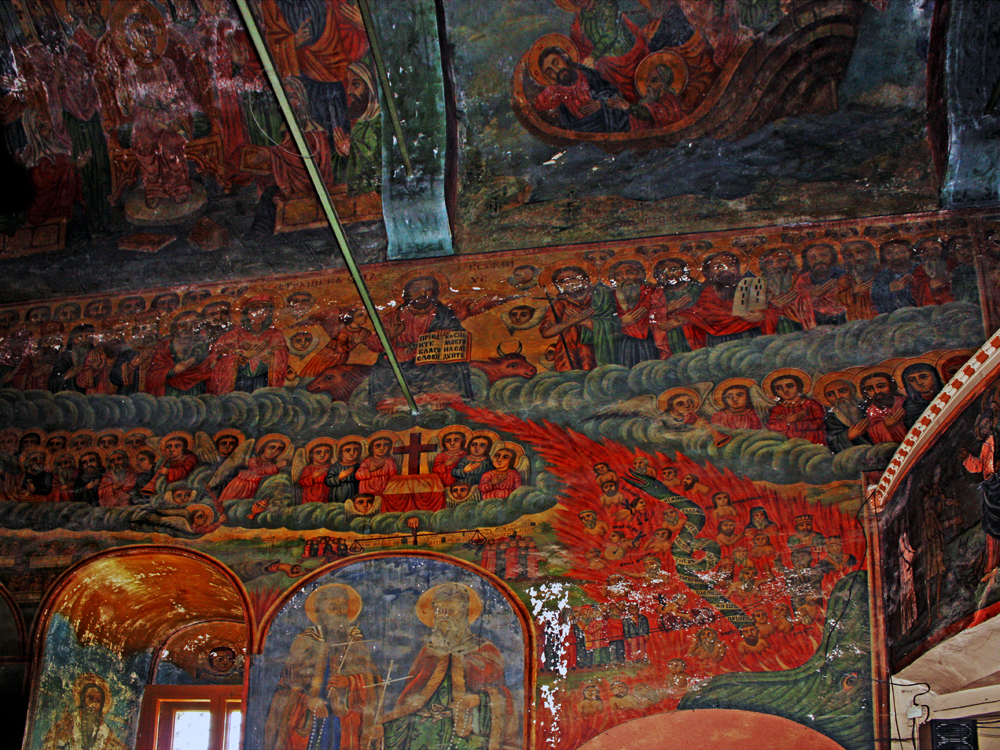
19th century Orthodox Frescoes from Archangel Michael Church in Kostenets

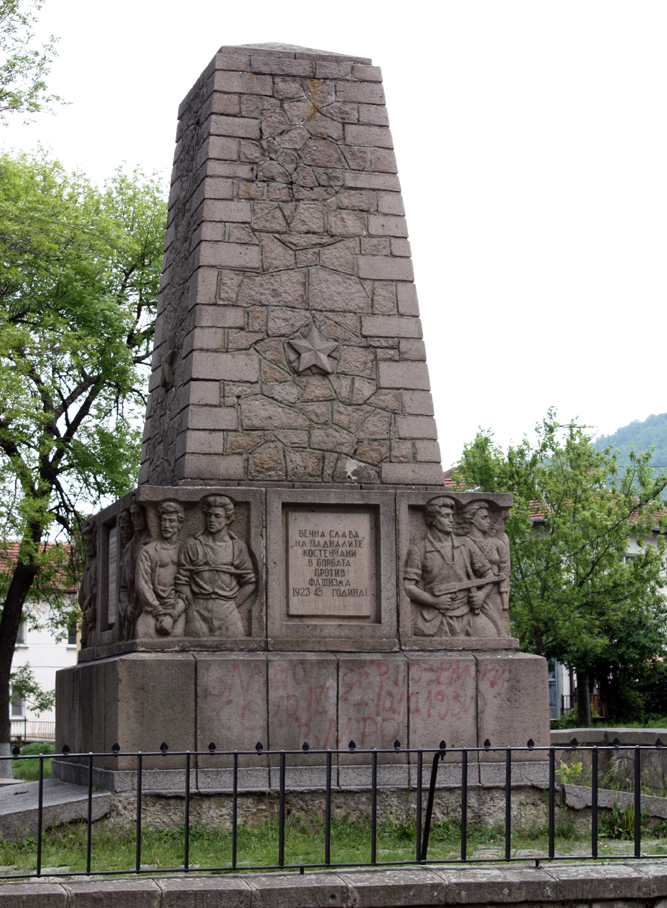
Monument to the fallen antifascists (1923-1945) in Kostenets village

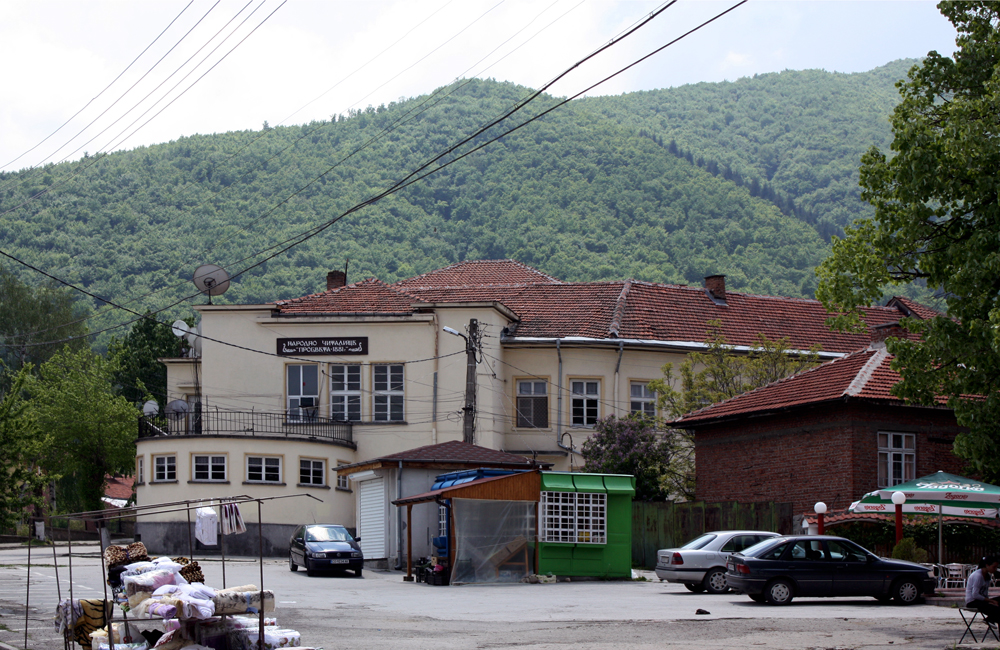
Culture club (Chitalishte) "Probuda" (evocation) in Kostenets, founded 1881
