= Momin Prohod =

Momin Prohod Момин проход
- Town
- Location of Momin Prohod
- Coordinates: 42°20′N 23°52′E
- Country: Bulgaria
- Province (Oblast): Sofia
- Municipality: Kostenets

Government
  - Mayor: Ivan Arnautski
- Elevation: 494 m (1,621 ft)

Population (2009-03-15)
  - Total: 1,788
- Time zone: UTC+2 (EET)
  - Summer (DST): UTC+3 (EEST)
- Postal Code: 2035
- Area code: 07142

Momin Prohod (Bulgarian: Момин проход [ˈmɔmin ˈprɔxot]) is a health resort and spa located in western Bulgaria. It is part of the Kostenets Municipality in the Sofia Province, about 70 km (43 mi) from the city of Sofia. Geographically, it is located in the Kostenets–Dolna Banya Valley in the southwestern part of the Sredna Gora mountain range. In 2006, it obtained administrative autonomy and the status of town (град).

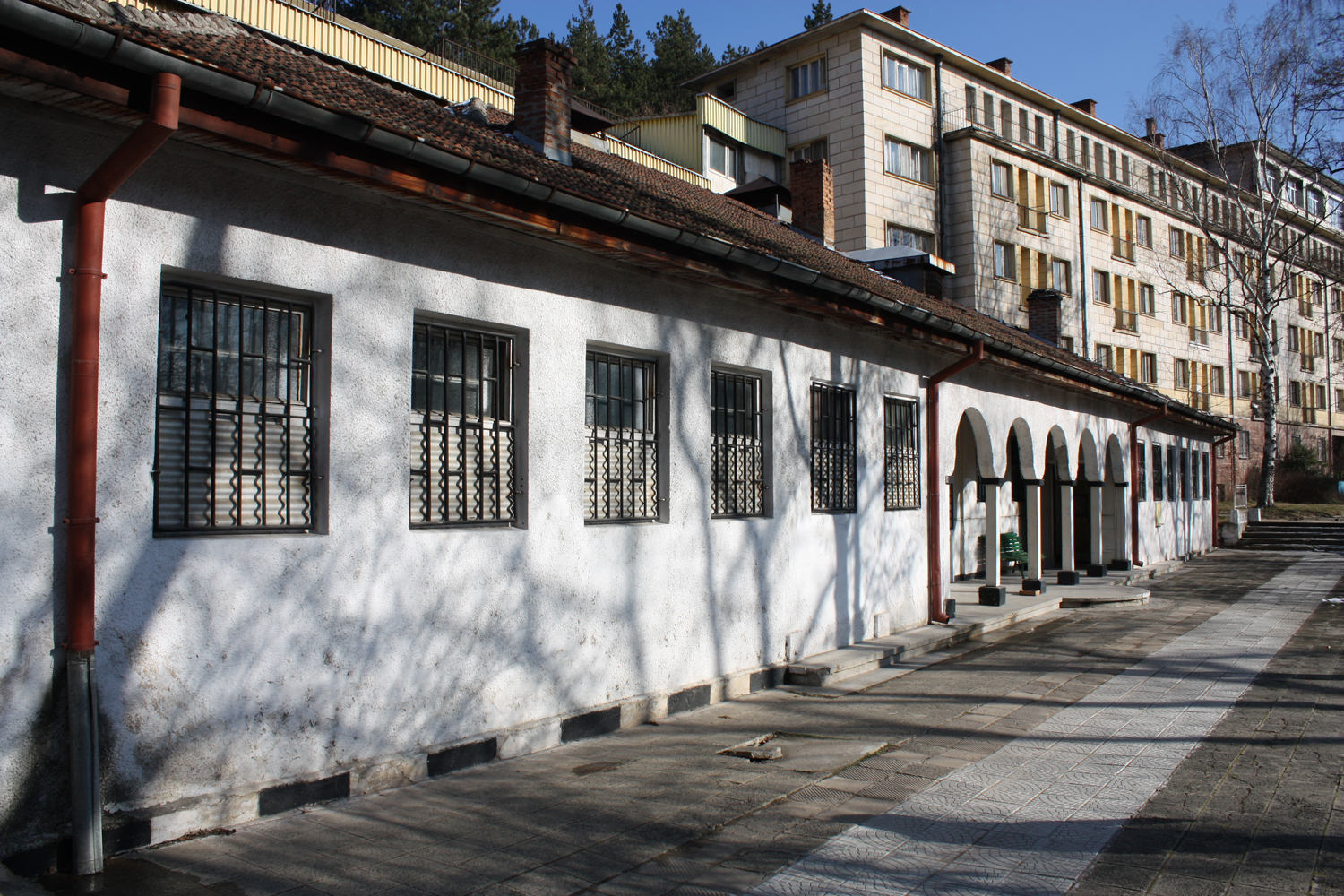
The old baths in Momin Prohod (functioning)

The resort is an important therapeutic and rehabilitation center. The water of Momin Prohod is second to that of the Narechenski Bani spa in its radioactivity, third in Europe, and 25th in the world.

== Info ==
- Average annual temperature: + 10,5^{о} С.
- Mineral water: hyperthermal 65 to 68^{о} С, weakly mineral, sulphate-sodium, moderately fluoric.
- Main health factors: mineral water and mud, electric-treatment, and thermal procedures

== Gallery ==
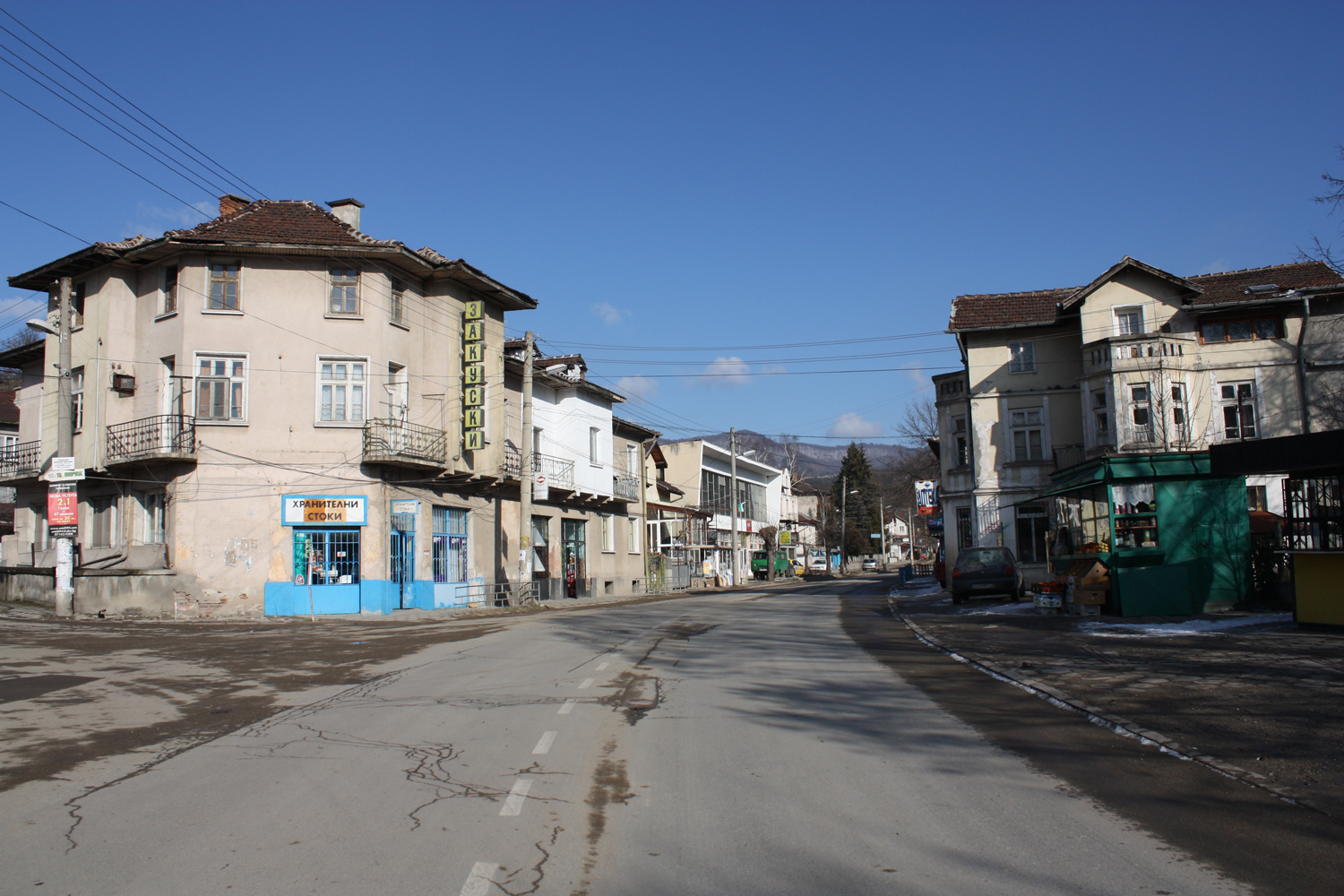
Momin Prohod main street

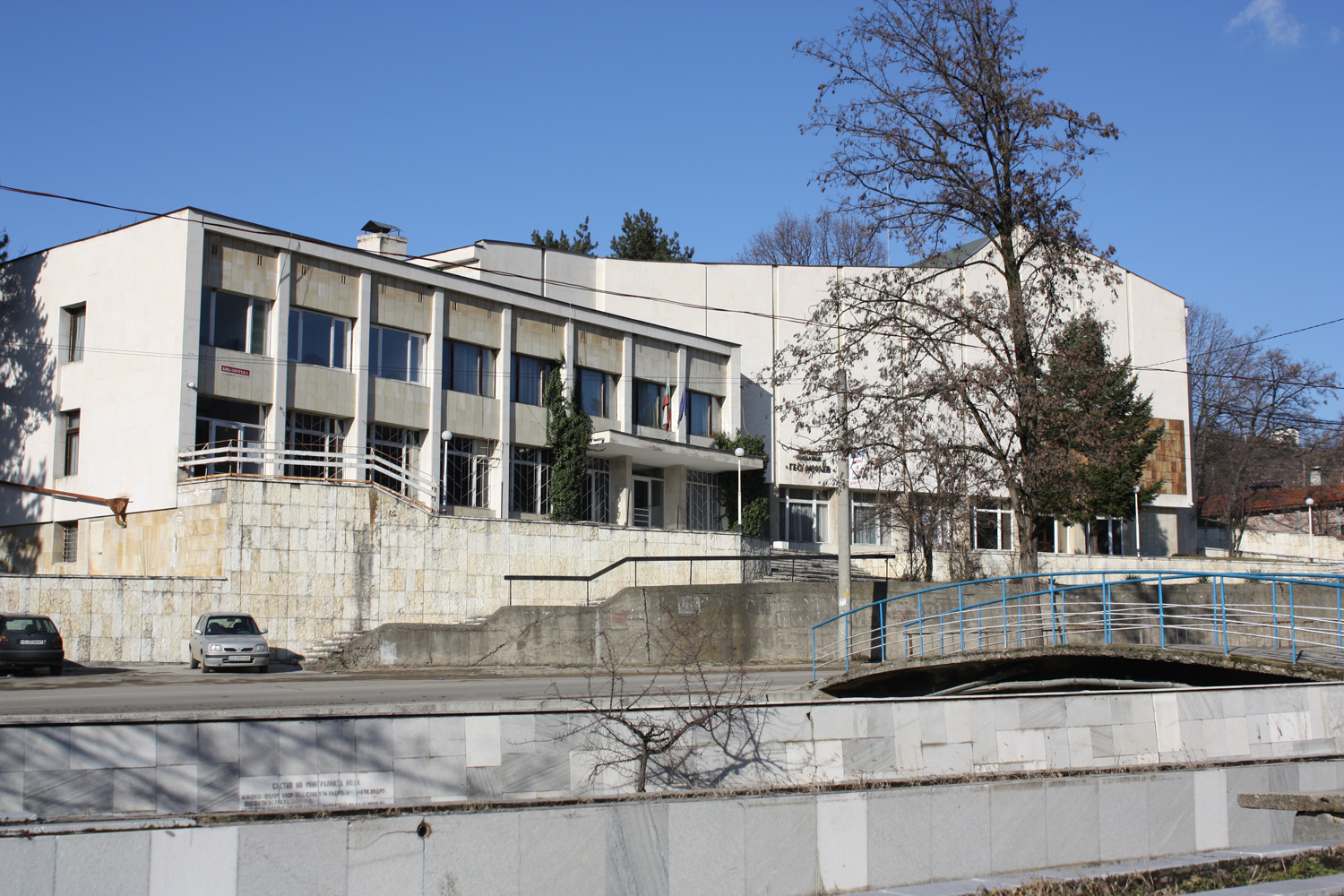
Momin Prohod Culture Club Geo Milev

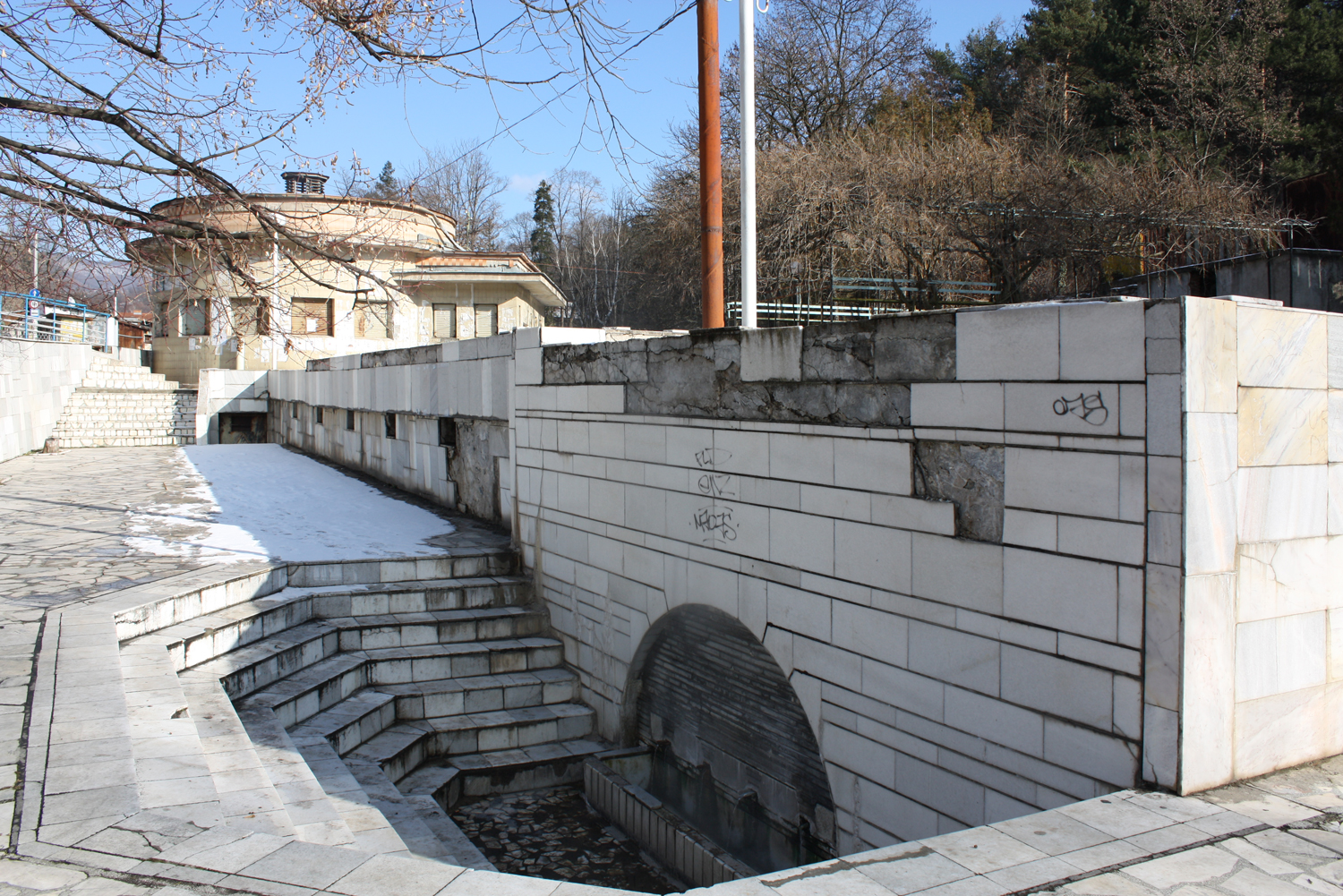
The mineral water fountain in Momin Prohod

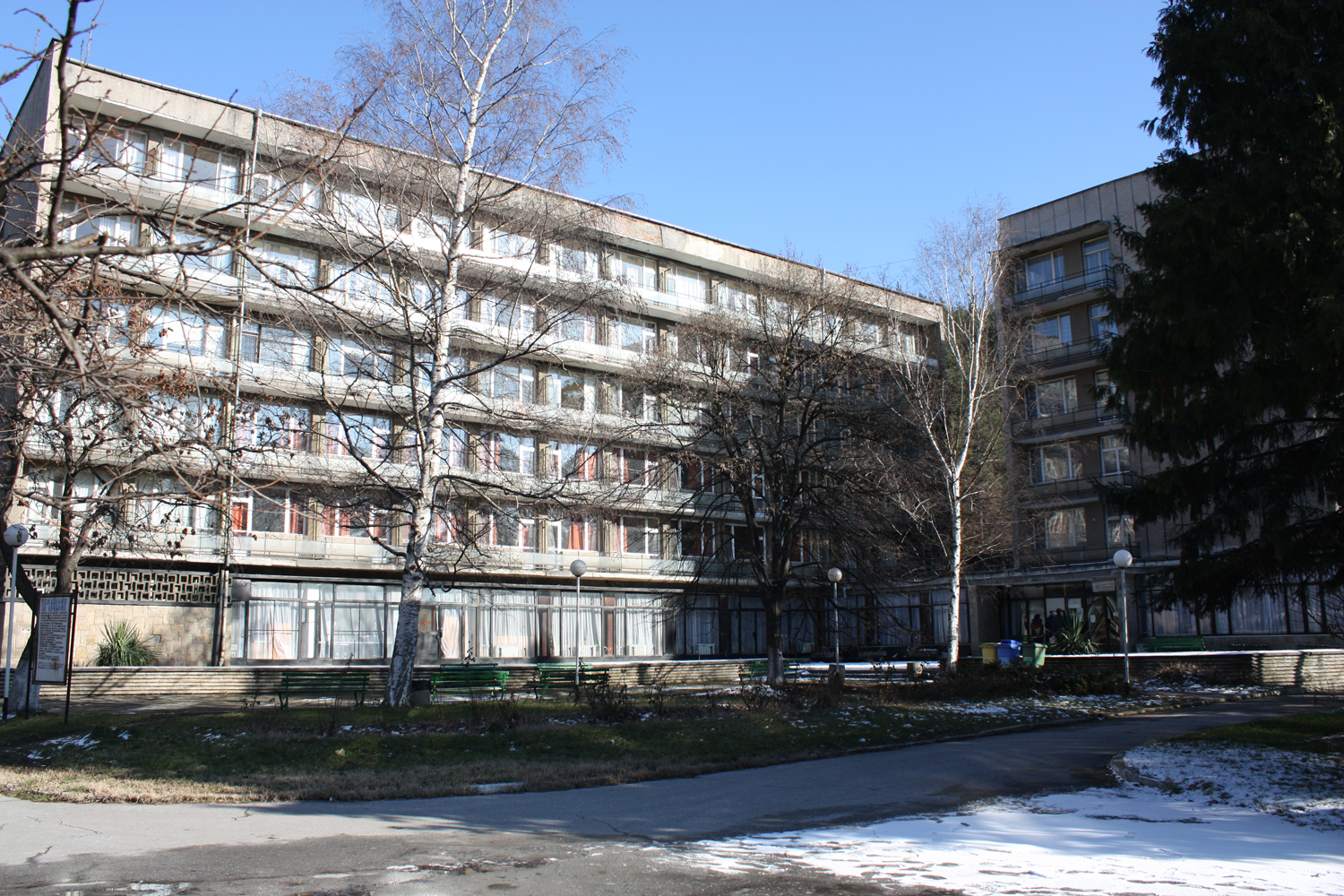
Spa rehabilitation hospital in Momin Prohod

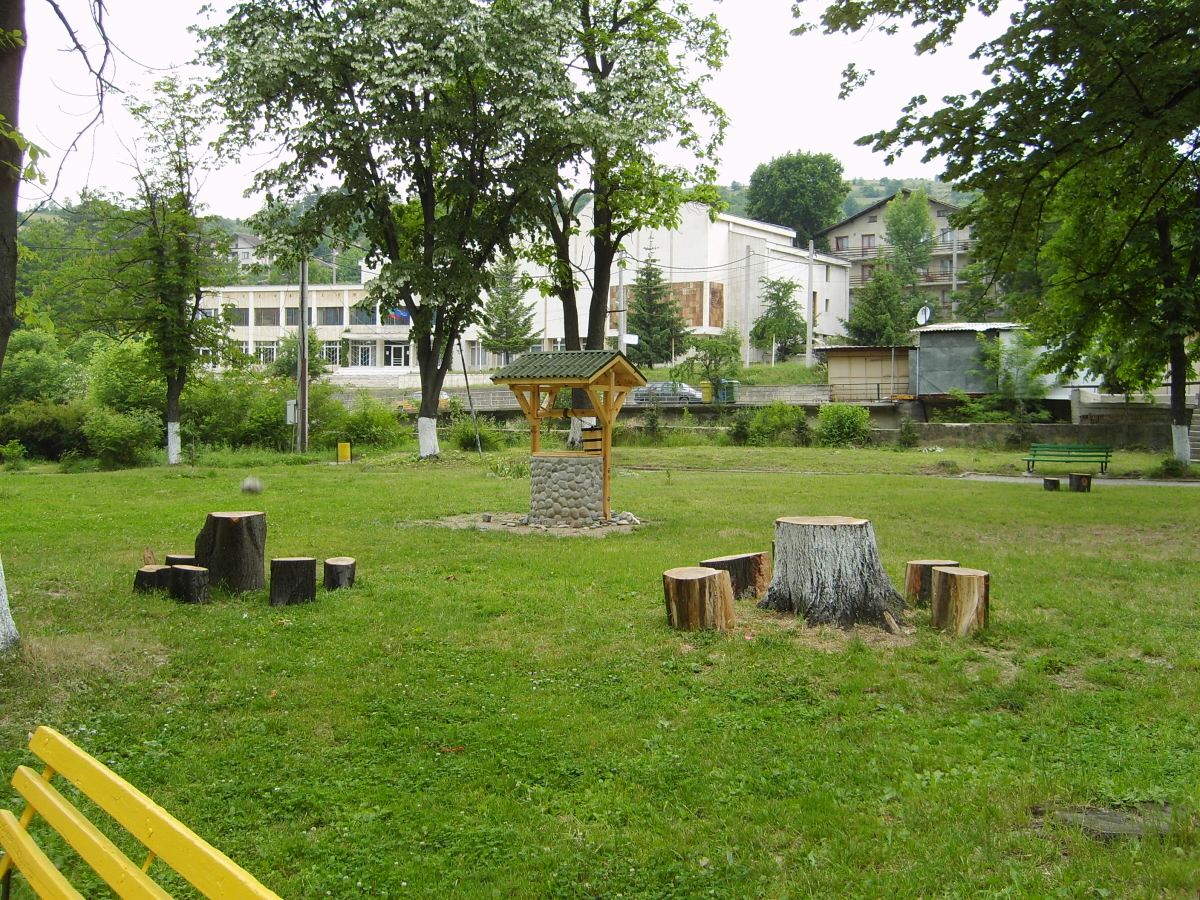
City park in Momin Prohod. The cultural community centre is in the background
