= Kostenets =

Kostenets Костенец
- Town
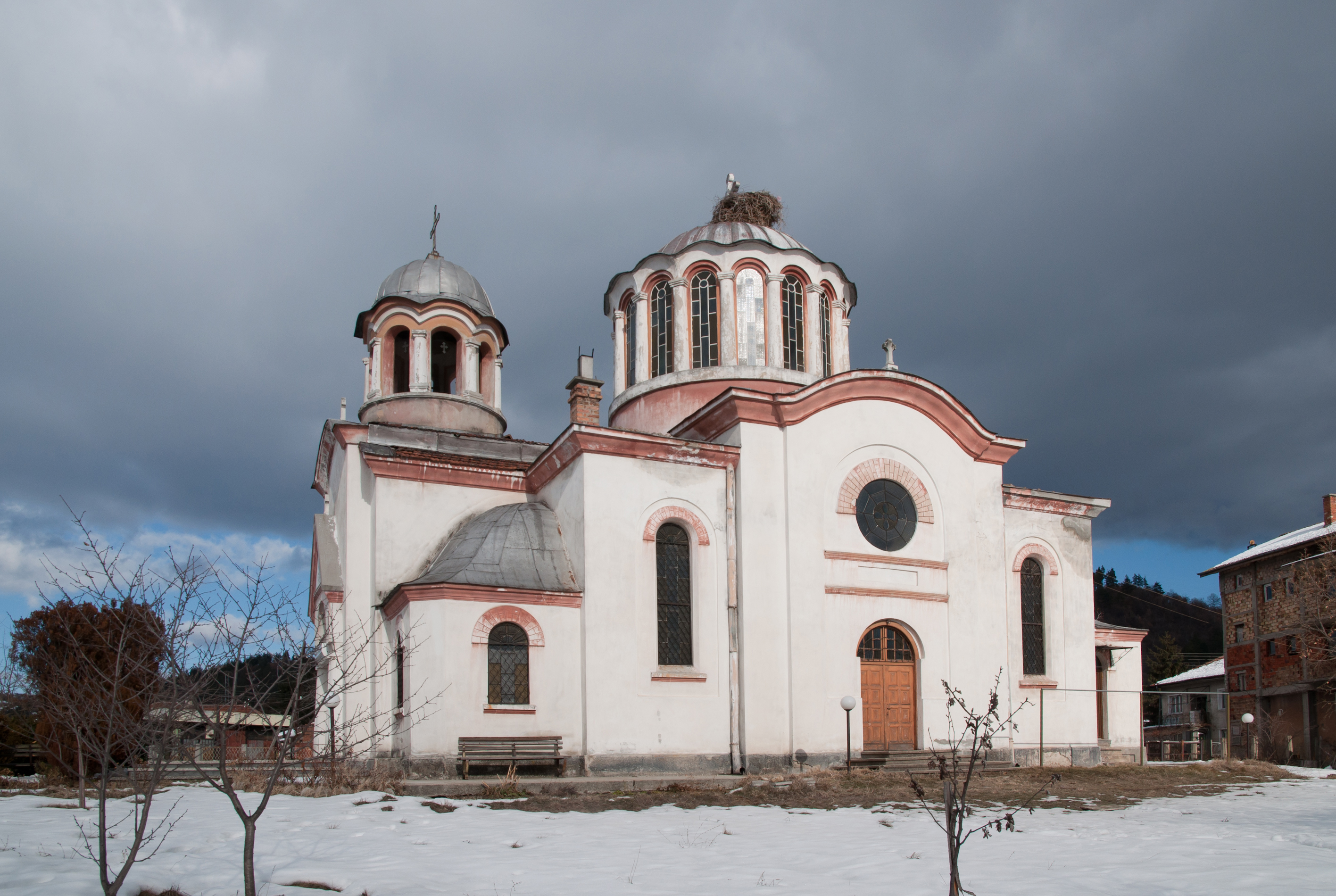
- St. George Church in Kostenets.

- Location of Kostenets (town)
- Coordinates: 42°18′N 23°52′E
- Country: Bulgaria
- Province (Oblast): Sofia
- Municipality: Kostenets

Government
  - Mayor: Radostin Radev
- Elevation: 494 m (1,621 ft)

Population (13.09.2005)
  - Total: 9,962
- Time zone: UTC+2 (EET)
  - Summer (DST): UTC+3 (EEST)
- Postal Code: 2030
- Area code: 07142

Kostenets (Bulgarian: Костенец [ˈkɔstɛnɛt͡s]) is a town in Sofia Province in western Bulgaria, and the administrative centre of the Kostenets Municipality (which also contains a separate village of Kostenets). The town is situated in the Kostenets–Dolna Banya Valley at the foot of the mountain ranges of Rila and Sredna Gora, about 70 km (43 mi) southeast of capital Sofia.

The average monthly and annual air temperature at daylight varies from -4.2C (January) to +16.1C (July). The abundance of mineral springs is one of the special characteristics of the region. The spa resort of Momin Prohod is a specialised centre for rehabilitation and recreation and attracts many visitors. The spa resorts Villas Kostenets, Pchelinski bani, and the village of Kostenets are near the town.

The favourable climatic factors, the unique combination of the thermal mineral water resources with the immediate proximity to the resort of Borovets and the country's capital, and the natural and historical sights provide a potential for year-round tourism, recreation, and sport. There is a library, a school, a supermarket, and a few shops.

Kostenets Saddle in Imeon Range on Smith Island in the South Shetland Islands, Antarctica is named after Kostenets.
