= Seven Altars Monastery =

Coordinates: 43°0′0″N 23°28′19″E

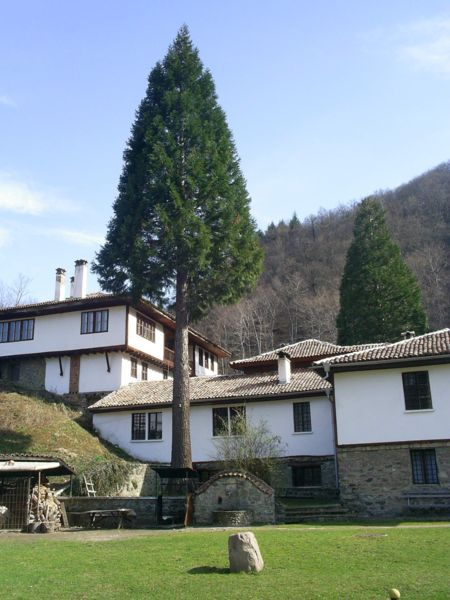
The Seven Altars Monastery

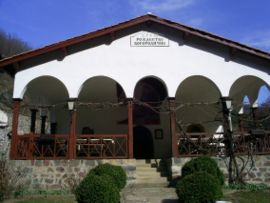
The church of the holy cloister

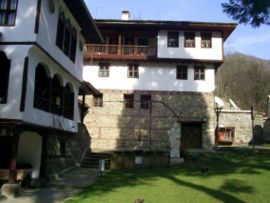
Yard view

The Seven Altars (Bulgarian: Седемте престола, Sedemte prestola), officially the Monastery of the Most Holy Mother of God (Bulgarian: Манастир „Света Богородица“, Manastir „Sveta Bogoroditsa“) is a Bulgarian Orthodox monastery of the Eparchy of Sofia, situated in the western Balkan Mountains, on the border between Sofia Province and Vratsa Province. It is located in the valley of the Gabrovnitsa River, on the way from Eliseyna through the Iskar Gorge to the village of Osenovlag, Sofia Province, at the foot of Izdremets Peak (1492 m). It is one of the 100 Tourist Sites of Bulgaria.

== History ==
A legend says that the short-lived Bulgarian tsar Peter Delyan (Peter II) died in the monastery, which was a temporary capital of Bulgaria. According to the same legend, the brother of the Bulgarian monarch became the first abbot of the holy cloister.

The monastery is more popular with its unofficial name "The Seven Altars" because of its unique church. The legend says that seven boyars established seven villages in the close proximity of the monastery — Osenovlag, Ogoya, Ogradishte, Bukovets, Leskovdol, Zhelen and Lakatnik. There are seven chapels (altars) in the church and experts claim that there is no other Bulgarian church of this kind. There is evidence that the monastery existed in the 16th century.

On the north side of the monastery there are ruins of a fortress, which local people call the "Latin Stronghold". Parts of its stone wall can be seen from the steep pathway starting from the monastery. The monastery's gate was taken from these remains.

Another legend says that during the Ottoman Age the monastery was demolished and set on fire. Valchan gathered the voivodes. They decided to build the monastery. The voivodes were seven: Valchan Voyvoda, Father Martin, Spiros Dimitar, Malenko the Serb, Emin Bey, Ali Bey and Petar. The church was built with seven altars in their honour. Valchan's idea was actually to hide the entrance to the fortress. Down in its vault a Roman treasure was hidden.

St Sophronius of Vratsa, bishop of the Eparchy of Vratsa, lived and officiated in the monastery, which was part of his diocese at the time.

== Geography ==
The monastery is situated only 86 km away from Sofia, which makes it a popular weekend destination. It offers camping facilities and a large dining-room for gatherings.

The Seven Altars Monastery can be reached by car from Eliseyna in the Iskar Gorge. Eliseyna is 42 km away from Sofia, on the Sofia ring-road through Novi Iskar, and 46 km from Mezdra. Only passenger trains stop at this station. The distance to the monastery is about 10–12 km. The road to the Seven Altars runs through the middle of Eliseyna, across the railway.

The road to the monastery is quite narrow, but asphalt-paved. The grave of the famous Bulgarian children's writer Zmey Goryanin (1905–1958)—author of 50 books and brochures—is in the yard, behind the church. There are sequoias planted in the monastery yard, the roots of which have started cracking the walls.
