= Batuliyska reka =

Blato
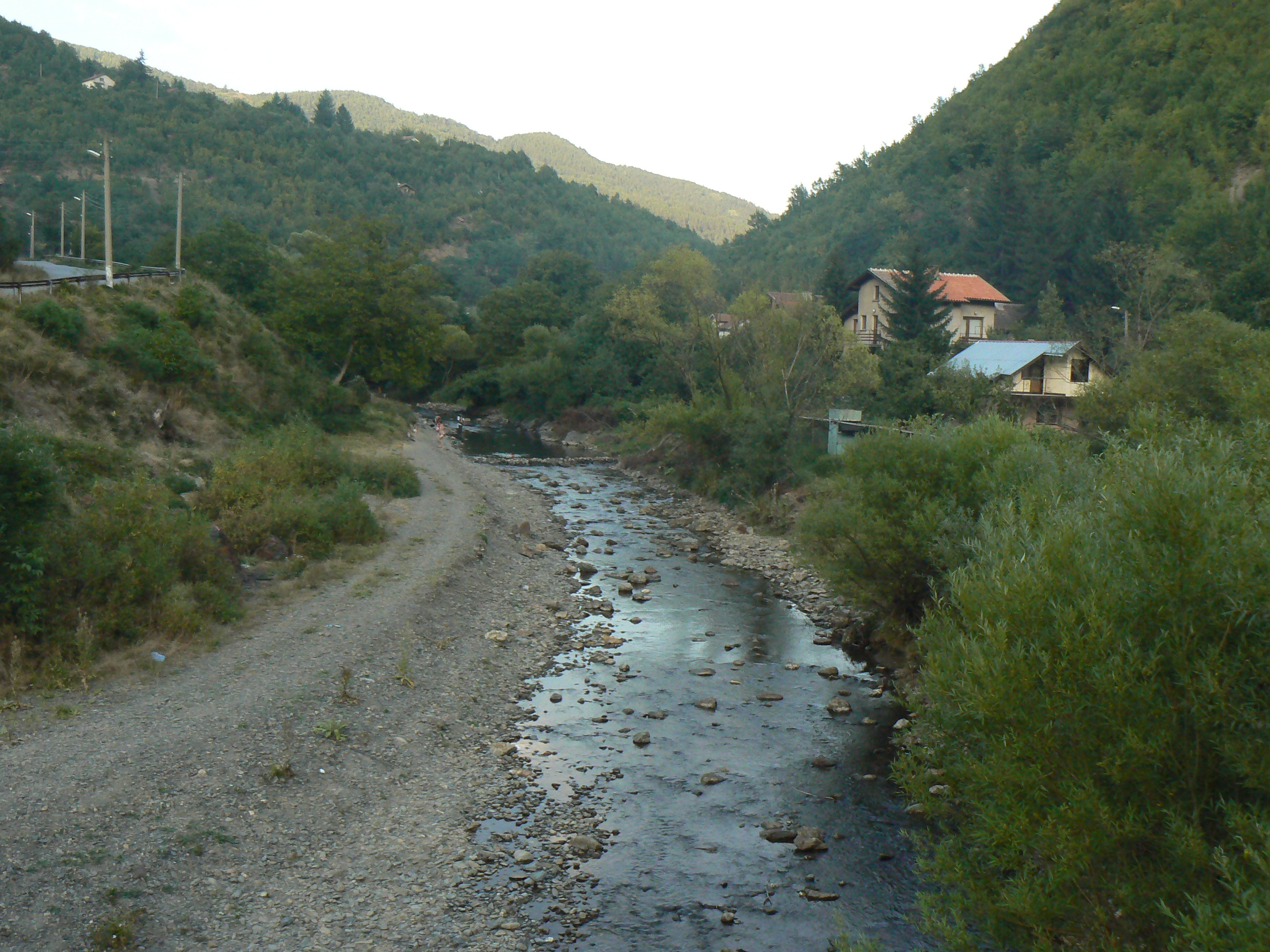

Location
- Country: Bulgaria

Physical characteristics
- Source
  - location: Murgash, Balkan Mountains
  - coordinates: 42°49′19.92″N 23°38′49.92″E
  - elevation: 1,366 m (4,482 ft)
- Mouth
  - location: Iskar
  - coordinates: 42°48′2.16″N 23°21′48.96″E
  - elevation: 496 m (1,627 ft)
- Length: 40 km (25 mi)
- Basin size: 256 km^{2} (99 sq mi)

Basin features
- Progression: Iskar→ Danube→ Black Sea

The Batuliyska reka (Bulgarian: Батулийска река) is a 40 km-long river in western Bulgaria, a right tributary of the river Iskar.

The river takes its at an altitude of 1,366 m, in the Murgash division of the Balkan Mountains. It initially flows north and after receiving its tributary the Elovitsa, it turns west until its mouth. It flows in a deep forested valley between the Golema Planina to the north and the Sofiyska Planina to the south, both divisions of the Balkan Mountains. Downstream of the village of Batulia its valley widens. The river flows into the Iskar at an altitude of 496 m at the village of Rebrovo.

Its drainage basin covers a territory of 256 km^{2} or 3.0% of Iskar's total. The Batuliyska reka has high water in March–June and low water in July–October. The average annual discharge at Batulia is 2.7 m^{3}/s.

The Batuliyska reka flows entirely in Sofia Province. There are four villages along its course: Yablanitsa, Bakyovo, Batulia and Rebrovo, all of them in Svoge Municipality.

== Gallery ==
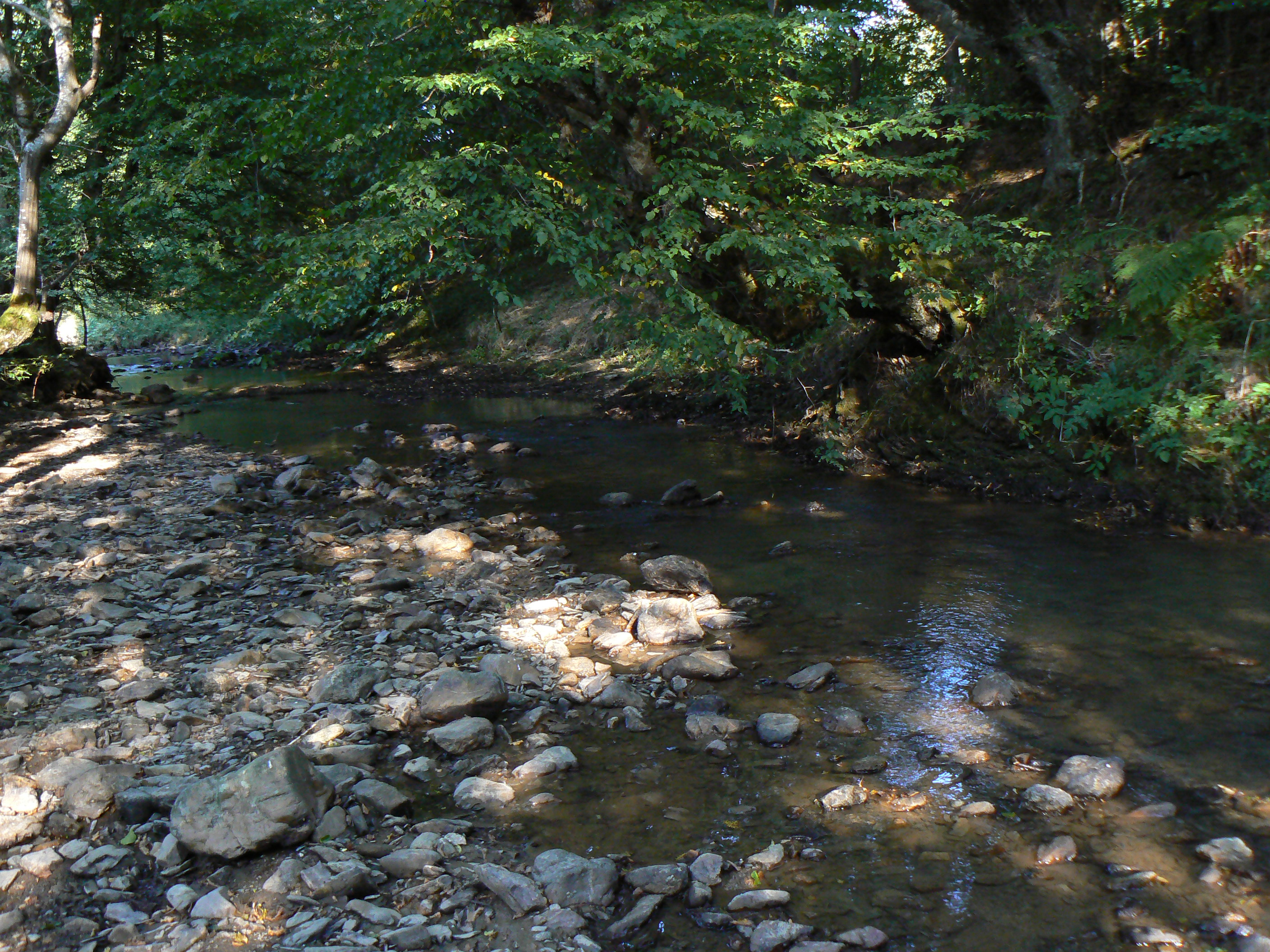
The river at Yablanitsa

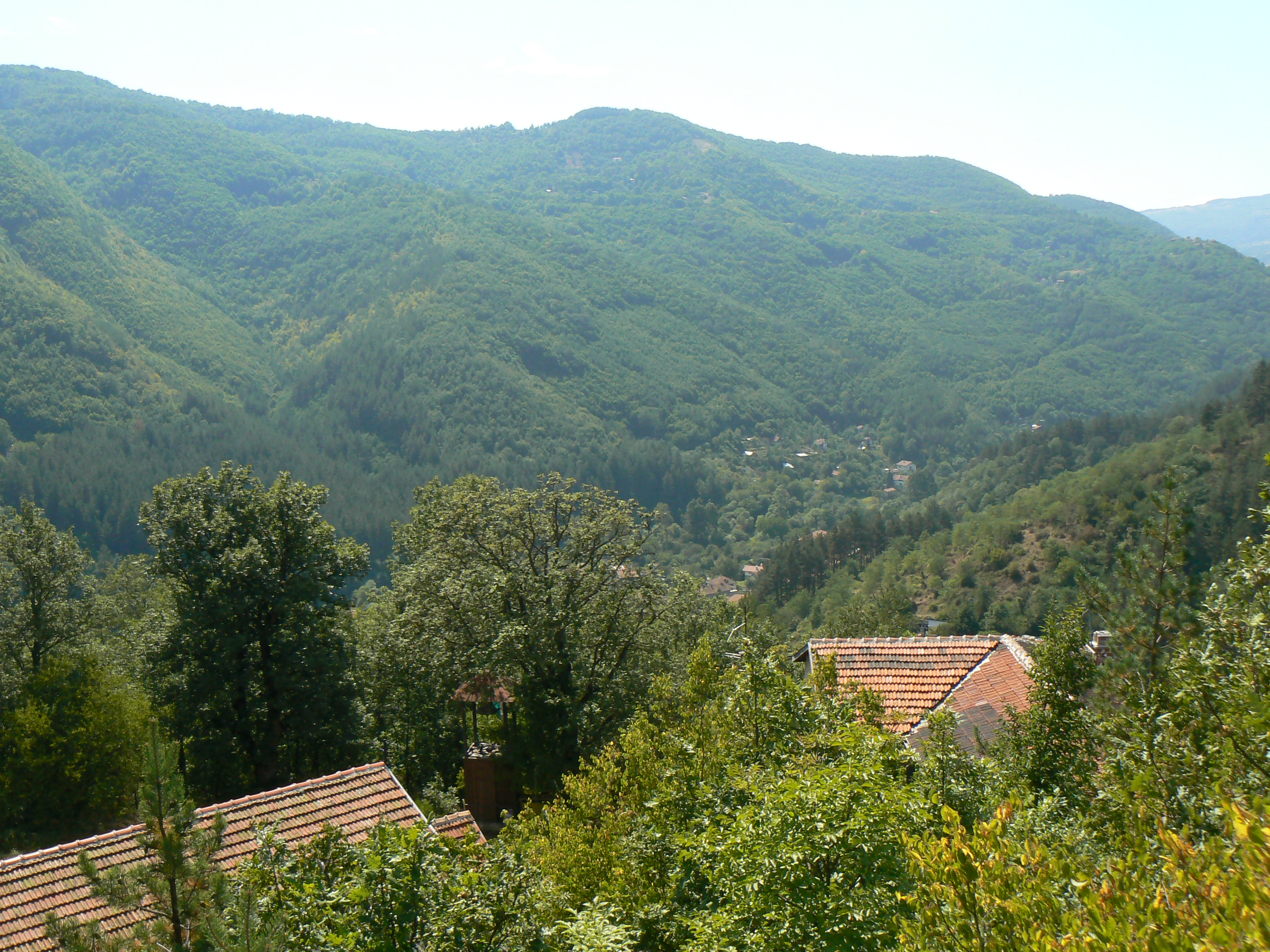
The river valley at Batulia
