= Rabrovo =

Rabrovo may refer to:

- Rabrovo, Bulgaria, in Boynitsa Municipality
- Rabrovo, Valandovo, North Macedonia
- Rabrovo (Kučevo), Serbia

== See also ==
- Rebrovo, Bulgaria
