= Lakatnik =

Lakatnik Лакатник
- Village
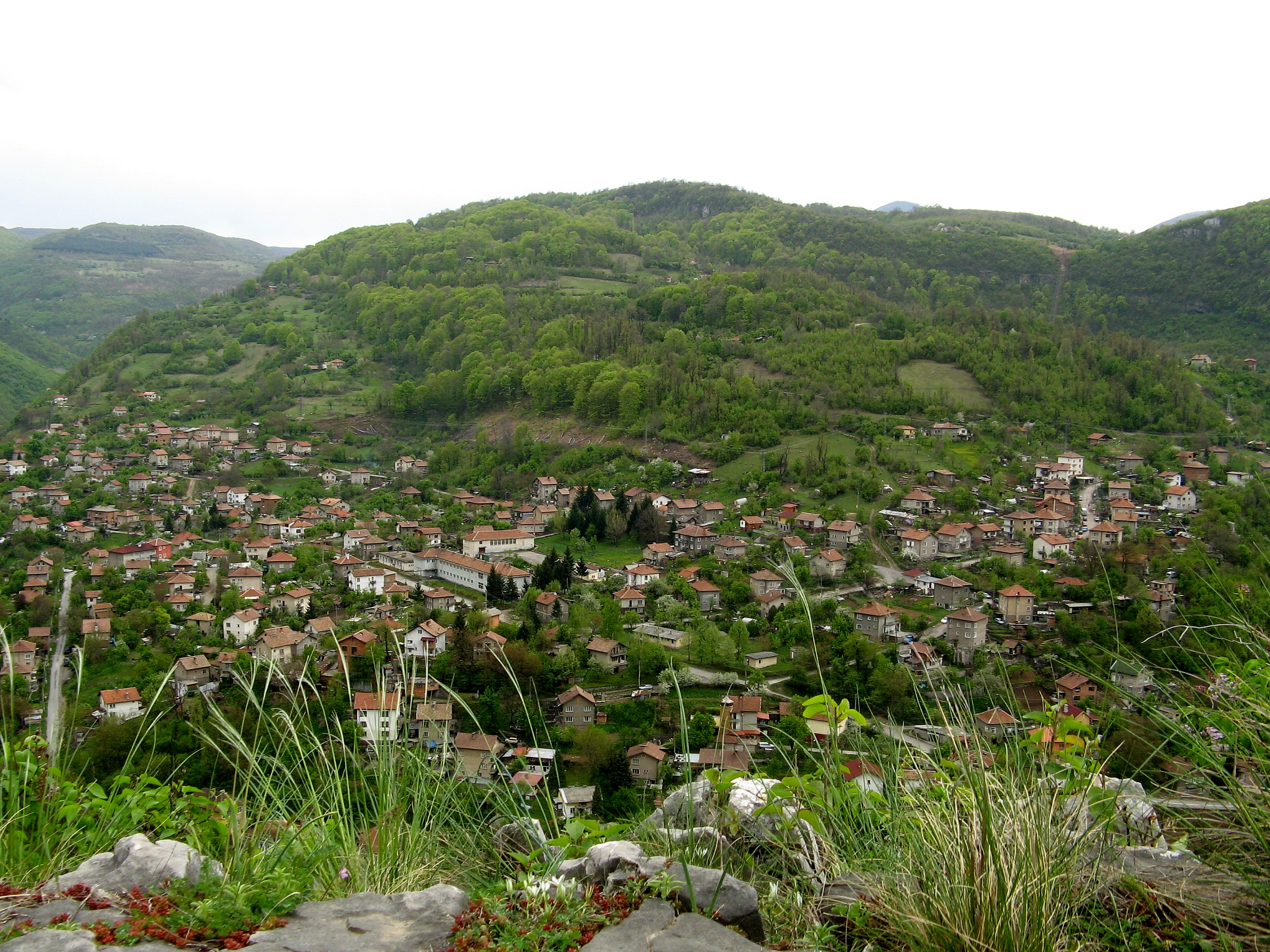

- Location in Bulgaria
- Coordinates: 43.052949°N 23.407580°E
- Country: Bulgaria
- Province: Sofia Province
- Municipality: Svoge Municipality

Population (2016)
  - Total: 111
- Time zone: UTC+2 (EET)
  - Summer (DST): UTC+3 (EEST)

Lakatnik (Bulgarian: Лакатник [ɫɐˈkatnik]) is a small village located in Svoge Municipality, near the Lakatnik rocks. The village has a train station called Gara Lakatnik on the train line Sofia - Mezdra located 8 km north of the village. During the years the train station turned into in a separate settlement.

Lakatnik will co-host the Bulgarian National Youth Games in August 2017. The other host villages will be Bov, Gara Bov and Gara Lakatnik. The cycling events will take part in the village.
