= Gabrovnitsa =

Gabrovnitsa may refer to two villages, both in Bulgaria:

- Gabrovnitsa, Montana Province - a village in Montana municipality, Montana Province
- Gabrovnitsa, Sofia Province - a village in Svoge municipality, Sofia Province
