= Leskovdol =

Bulgarian village in Sofia Province

Leskovdol Лесковдол
- Village
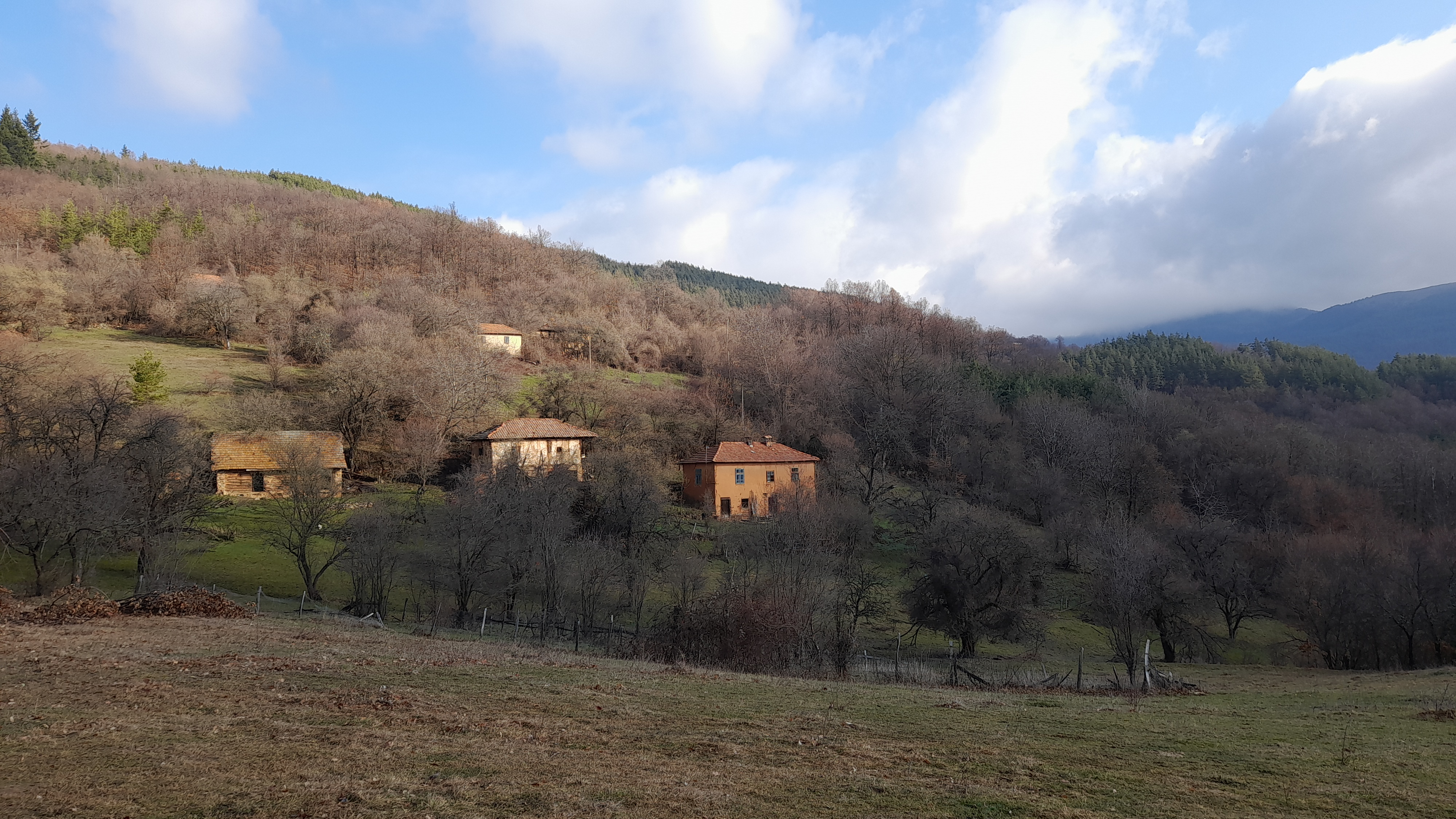

- Location within Bulgaria
- Coordinates: 42°58′32.96″N 23°24′25.04″E
- Country: Bulgaria
- Province: Sofia Province
- Municipality: Svoge

Area
  - Total: 26.2 km^{2} (10.1 sq mi)

Population (15 June 2024)
  - Total: 59
- Time zone: UTC+2 (EET)
  - Summer (DST): UTC+3 (EEST)
- Postal Code: 2268
- Website: https://leskovdol.com

Leskovdol (Bulgarian: Лесковдол) is a mountainous village in Western Bulgaria situated in Golema mountain, part of the Balkan mountain range. It is located 45 kilometers north from Sofia within Svoge Municipality. According to the 2021 census the settlement has 65 inhabitants. Several places of interest are located nearby Leskovdol with Seven Altars monastery, Izdremets peak and a section of the Kom–Emine long-distance footpath being the main ones.

== Etymology ==
Leskovdol's name means a small valley with hazel trees. The word for hazel tree in Bulgarian is leska while the word dol is translated in English as small valley.

== Area ==
The entire territory of Leskovdol - with all of its scattered residential districts, adjacent forests and meadows - is a little over 26,2 square kilometers.

== Nature and landscape ==
The landscape is steep, typical for the Western Balkan mountain region. Leskovdol is situated between 700 and 1100 meters above sea level with Vratnitsa being the highest located residential district at around 1080 meters. Dirt roads link Leskovdol with its neighbouring villages of Bukovets, Brezovdol, Redina (to the south), Želen (to the west) & Bov (to the north). Wide mountain meadows make up to 39,8% of Leskovdol's territory and are mainly located in the higher parts of the village. Redinska is the main river which flows through the territory of the Leskovdol.

=== Flora & fauna ===
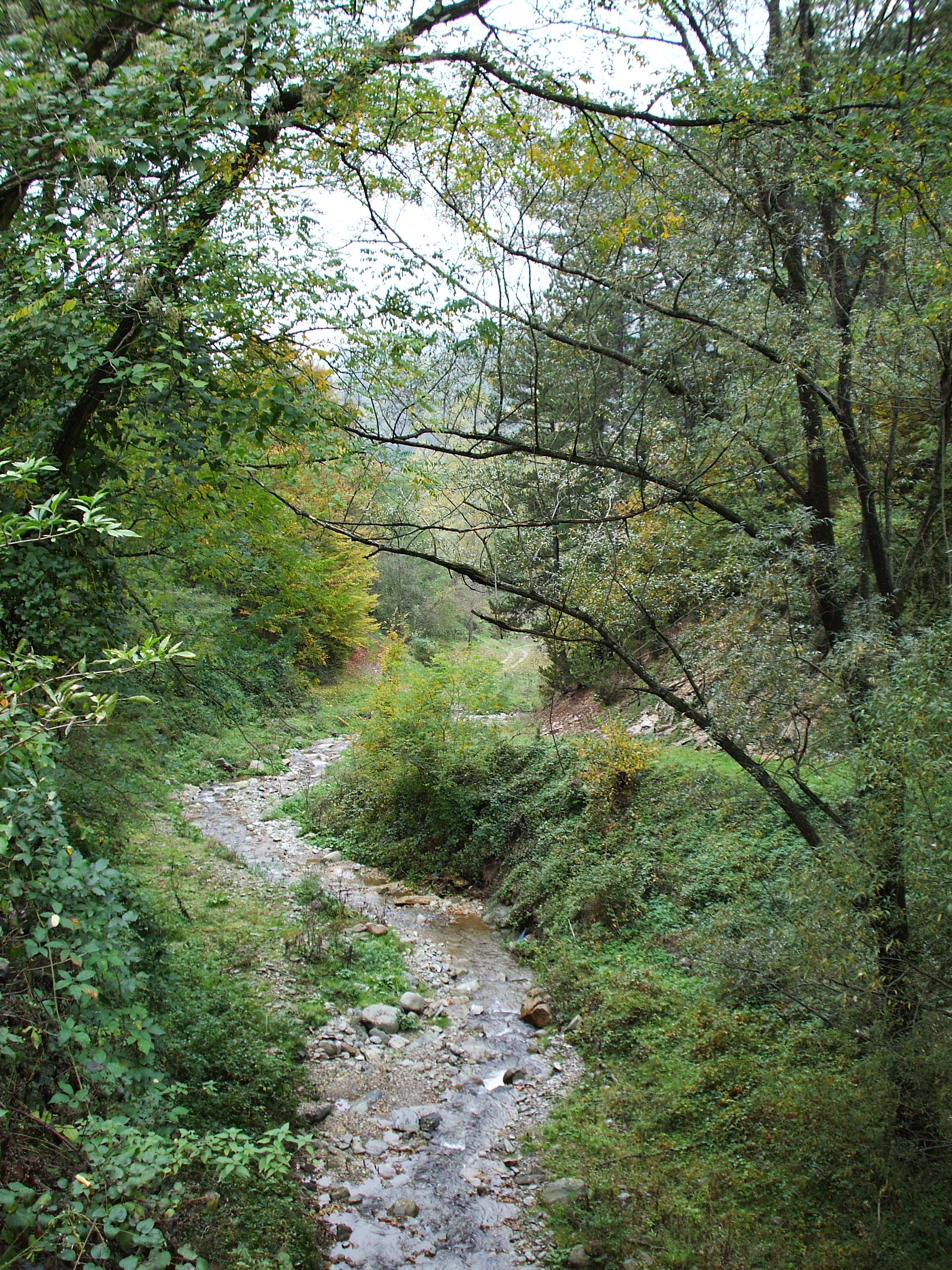
Redinska river

Forests cover a large percentage of the territory - around 55%. The conifers are mainly pines, spruces and firs, while the broad-leaved trees are well represented by multiple species including birches, fraxinus, tilias, fruit trees, hornbeams, walnut trees and beeches. The fauna in this region is typical for the Western Balkan mountain area. Wolves, wild rabbits, wild boars and hedgehogs inhabit the higher territories and the abandoned residential areas of the village which are not influenced by human activity. Domestic animals such as sheep, goats, pigs, chickens, cattle, cows and donkeys can be seen in the populated districts. A small part of Leskovdol's territory is under the protection of Natura 2000.

== History ==
It is believed that Leskovdol - alongside many of its surrounding settlements - was founded by people fleeing a process of forced islamization followed by the Ottoman conquest of Bulgaria. The settlement was first recorded as a village in a defter from 1526. Moreover, in the Tahrir Defter number 151 from 1528 the village was mentioned to have had Voynuk households under the Voynugan-ı Istabl-ı Amire military branch, which were Ottoman Christian Soldiers and were tax-exempt.

Additionally two summits located nearby Leskovdol - Lilyaka & Gradishte - are considered to be ancient fortresses, while the latter is thought to have been used to observe and protect the Iskar River during Roman times all the way until the Middle Ages. There's also a roman road along the ridge east of Razmeritsa district, which was used during Roman times to link Vratsa with Sofia.

== Division ==
The village is divided into a number of residential districts, most of which uninhabited or abandoned. The majority of the population is concentrated in the Selishte, Popov kladenets, Vratnitsa, Kokelini babki, Svinove and Dobrolevo bardo districts. Lozeto (Bulgarian: Лозето) bus stop on the bus route Svoge - Leskovdol marks the border between the territory of Leskovdol village and that of its neighbouring Redina village.

== Education ==
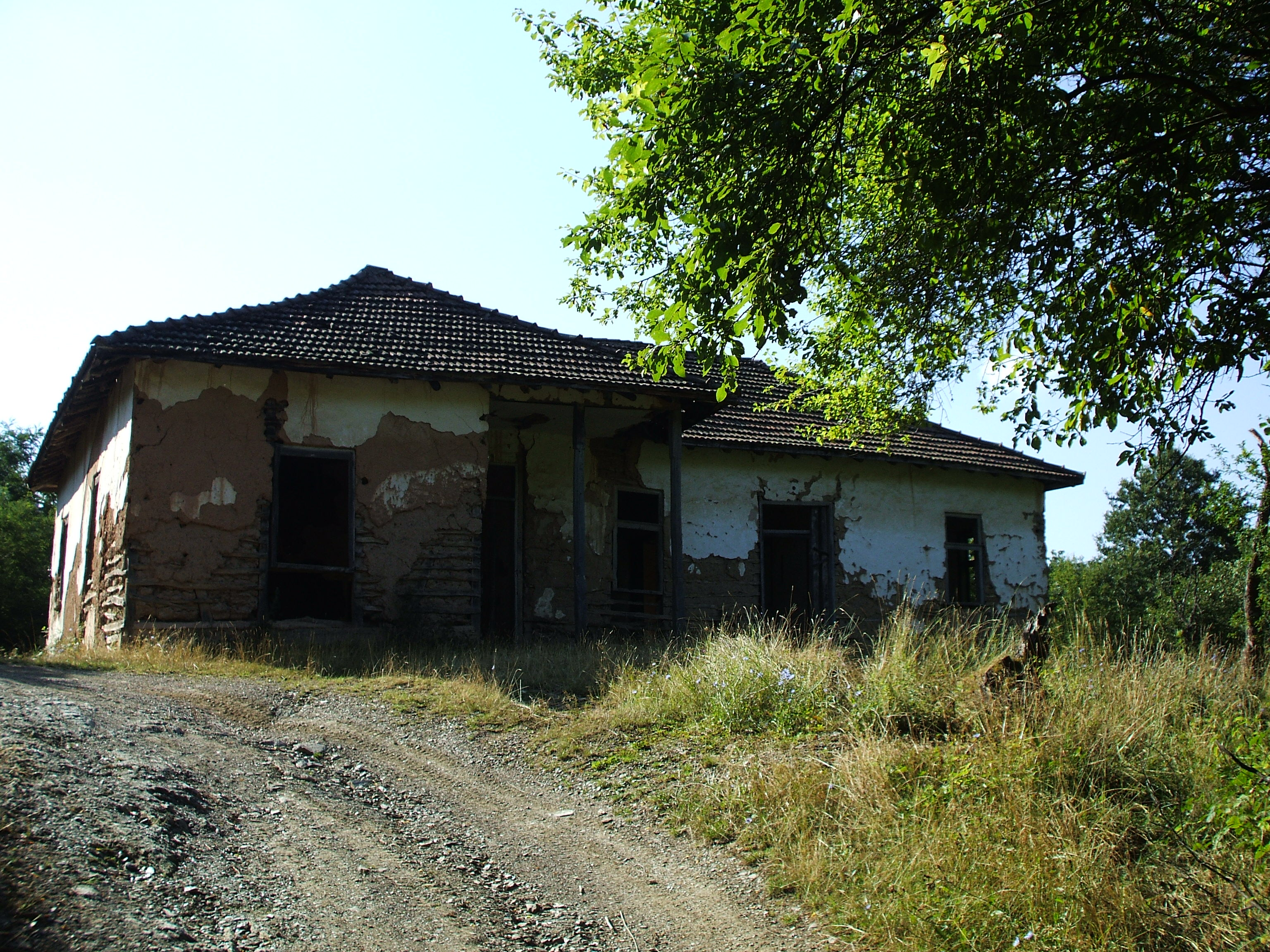
The Hristo Botev primary school

The village was served by two schools, both of which have shut down decades ago. The local children go to the nearby town of Svoge to continue their education.

Leskovdol had a chitalishte that hosted both a folklore and a music group. The folklore group has performed in festivals in Svoge and around the country.

== Demographics ==
A census from the beginning of the 20th century sets the population at 515 and growing. The migration towards the cities and the lowering fertility rate however kept Leskovdol from growing beyond 800 residents with the peak point being reached around the 1934 census - 822 inhabitants. Nowadays less than 60 people live permanently in the village.

=== 2011 census ===
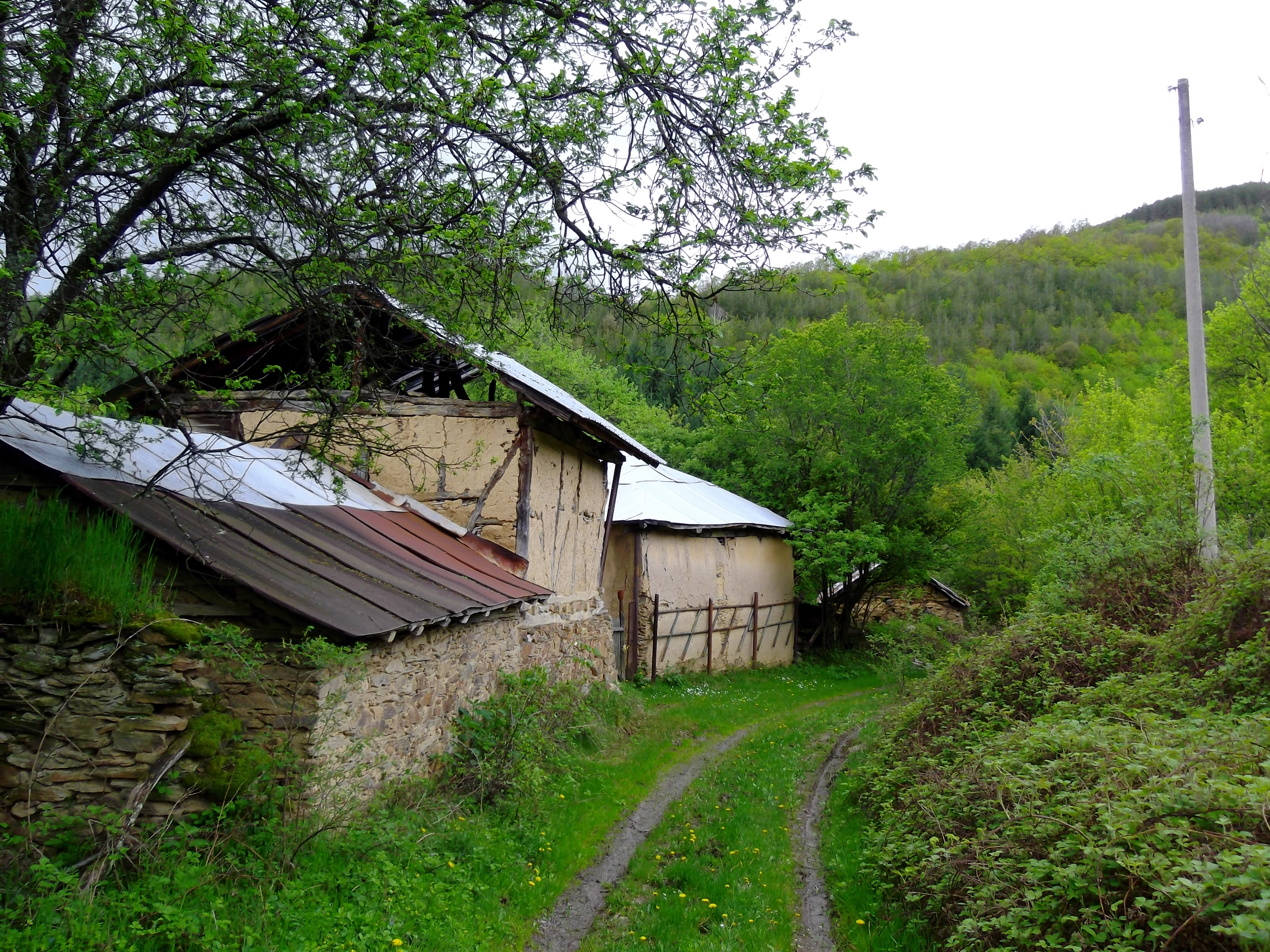
Radova livada district

According to the census held on the 01.02.2011 114 people declared to live in the village. Only 36 from them are officially retired.

=== Buildings ===
Houses, residential and non-residential buildings cover only around 5% of the entire village territory. Most of the old houses in the village were built using adobe, rocks and wood. In the late 1960s people, mainly from Sofia, bought parcels in the village's districts and started building a second type of houses - villas and bungalows - which they used as a residence for their summer vacations. The villas are built with modern building materials and thus create a mixed look of the village with both typical and new houses forming the background. According to the 2001 census there were 128 local houses, 26 of which abandoned, and 619 other buildings, including villas & barns.

== Economy ==
Woodcutters can sometimes be seen in this area, especially during late summer. Agriculture and animal breeding are developed in the populated areas.

== Religion ==
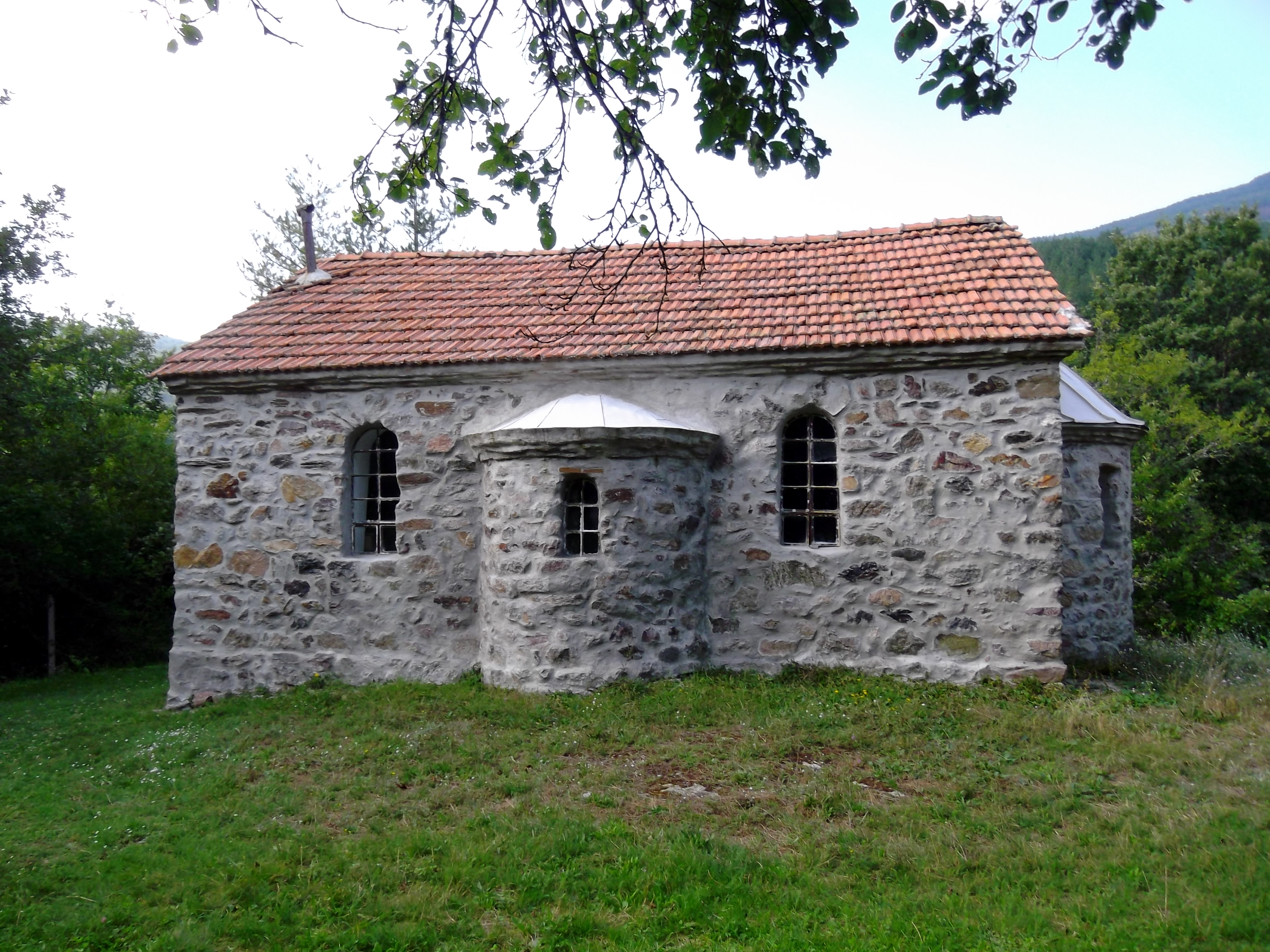
The church of Sveti prorok Iliya (St. Elias)

The entire population is Christian. There are three cemeteries - one nearby the village hall, one in Dabeto district and another one in Selishte residential district, where the village's church is also located. The small church - Sveti prorok Iliya ("Свети пророк Илия") bears the name of Saint Elias and was officially consecrated in 1933.

== Transport ==
The road to Leskovdol diverts from the main road Sofia - Mezdra just before entering Svoge. It is 8 kilometers long and end in the center of Kokelini babki residential district. Apart from it all others roads in the village are dirt roads.

Two charter buses run from Svoge to Leskovdol Monday through Saturday - one in the morning and another in the afternoon.

== Infrastructure ==
Almost all of the houses have electricity and water supply. There are no telephone lines except a telephone post in the village hall. The postal code is 2268. The TV and radio tower is located in Popov kladenets district. All three Bulgarian mobile operators have complete coverage in Leskovdol. The village hall shut down in the summer of 1999 due to the continuing diminution of the population.

== Gallery ==
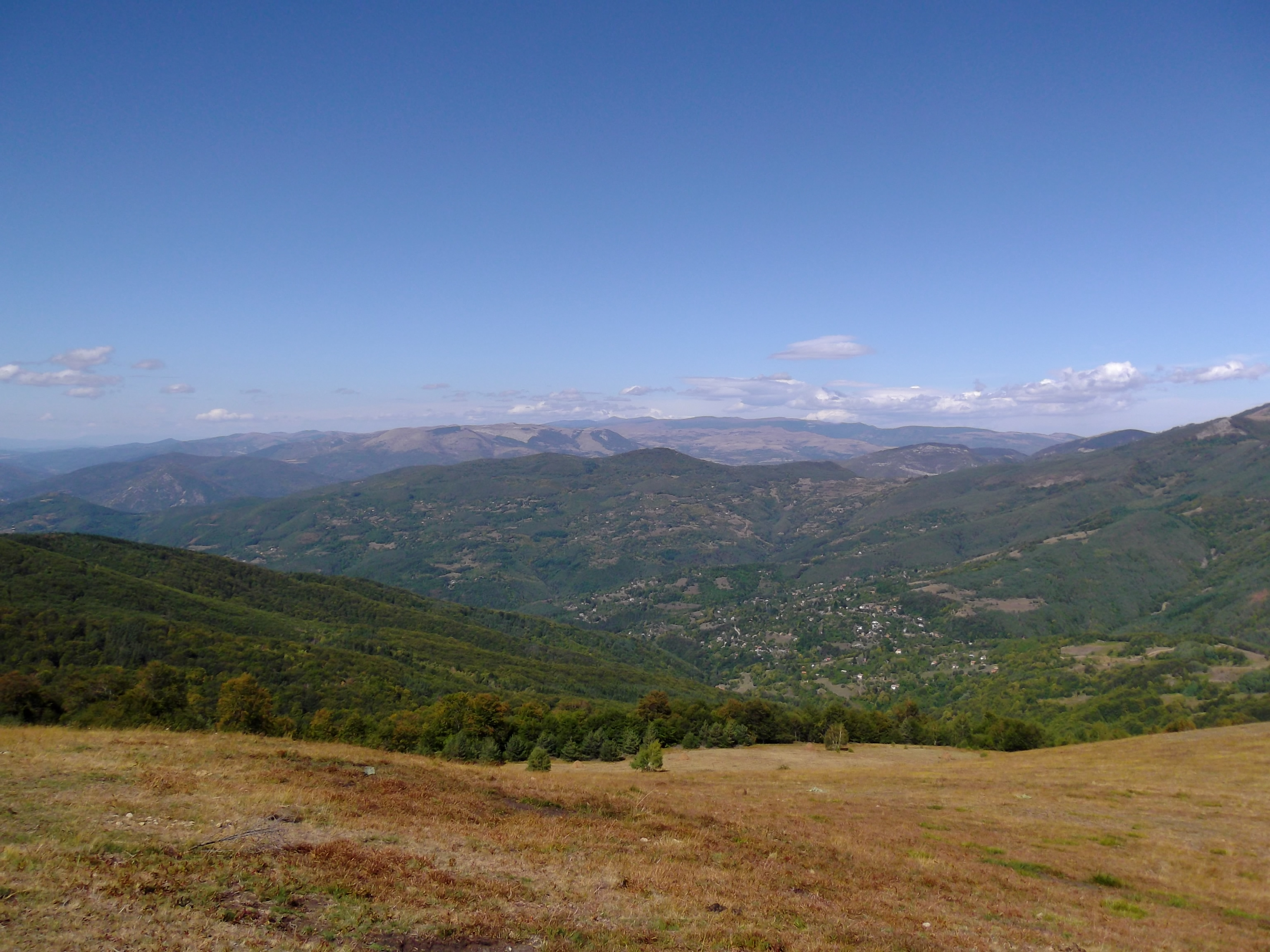
Leskovdol viewed from Visokata chukla peak

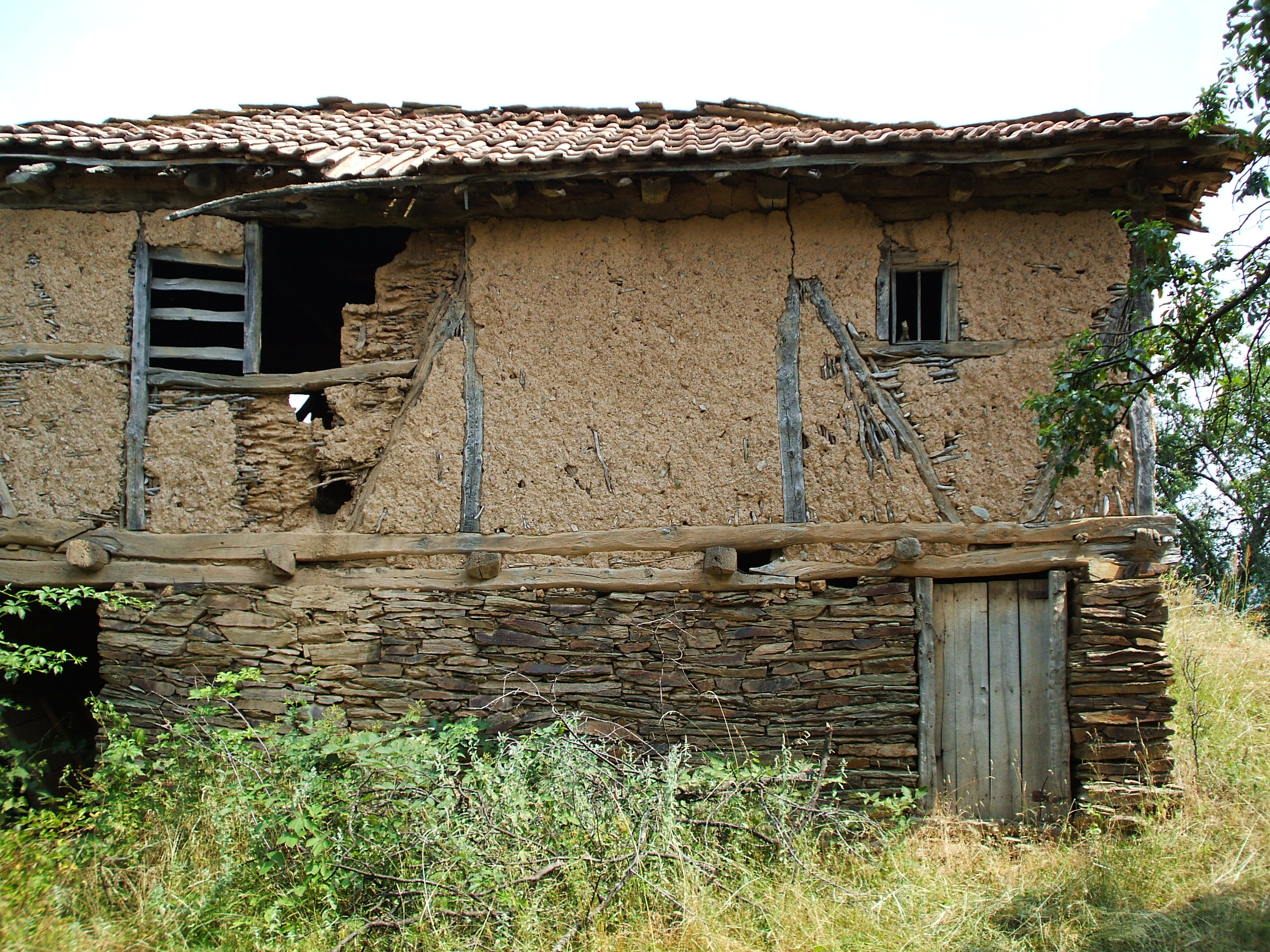
An old barn build from timber, leska stones & adobe

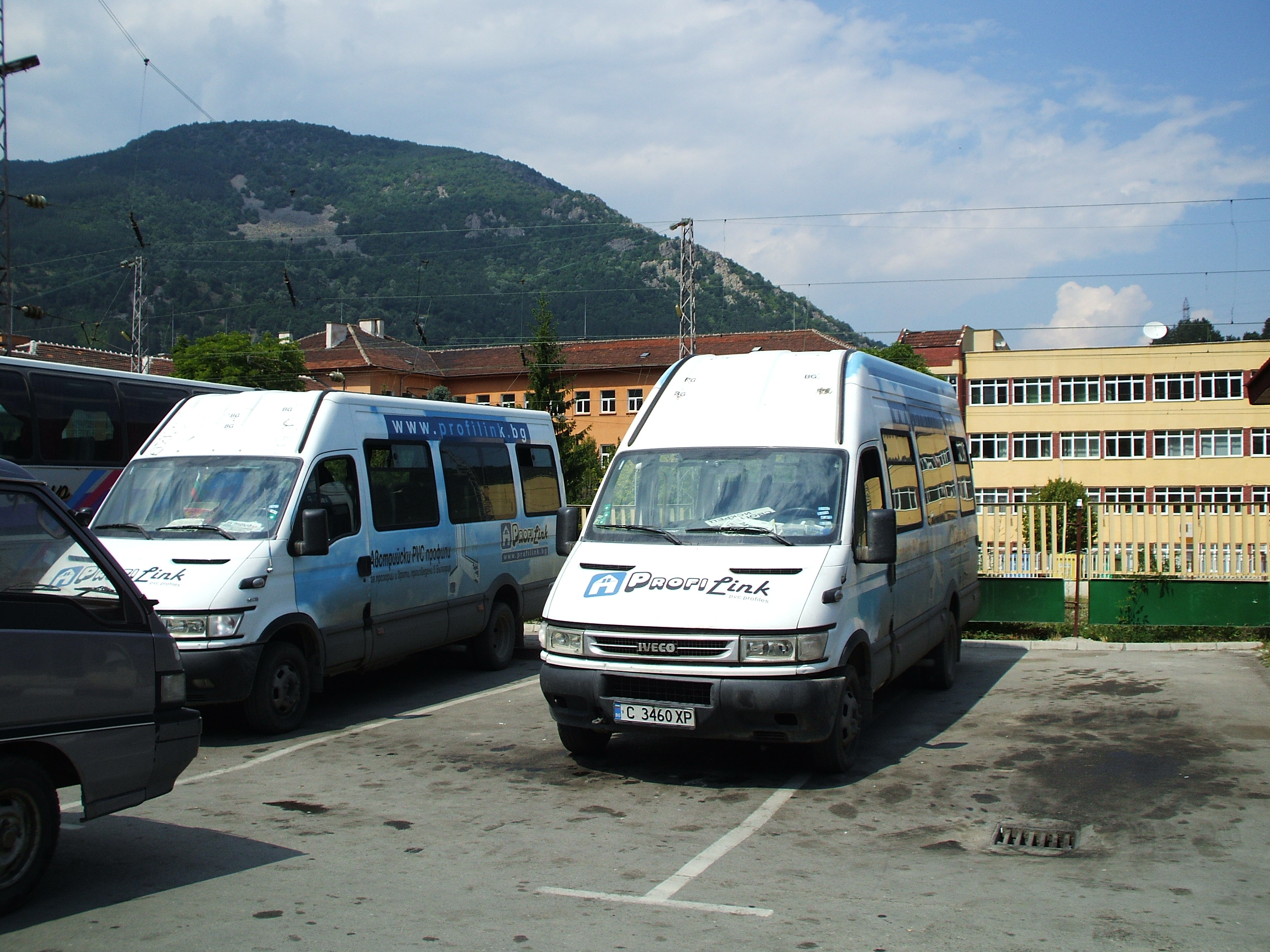
Buses to Leskovdol at the Svoge bus station

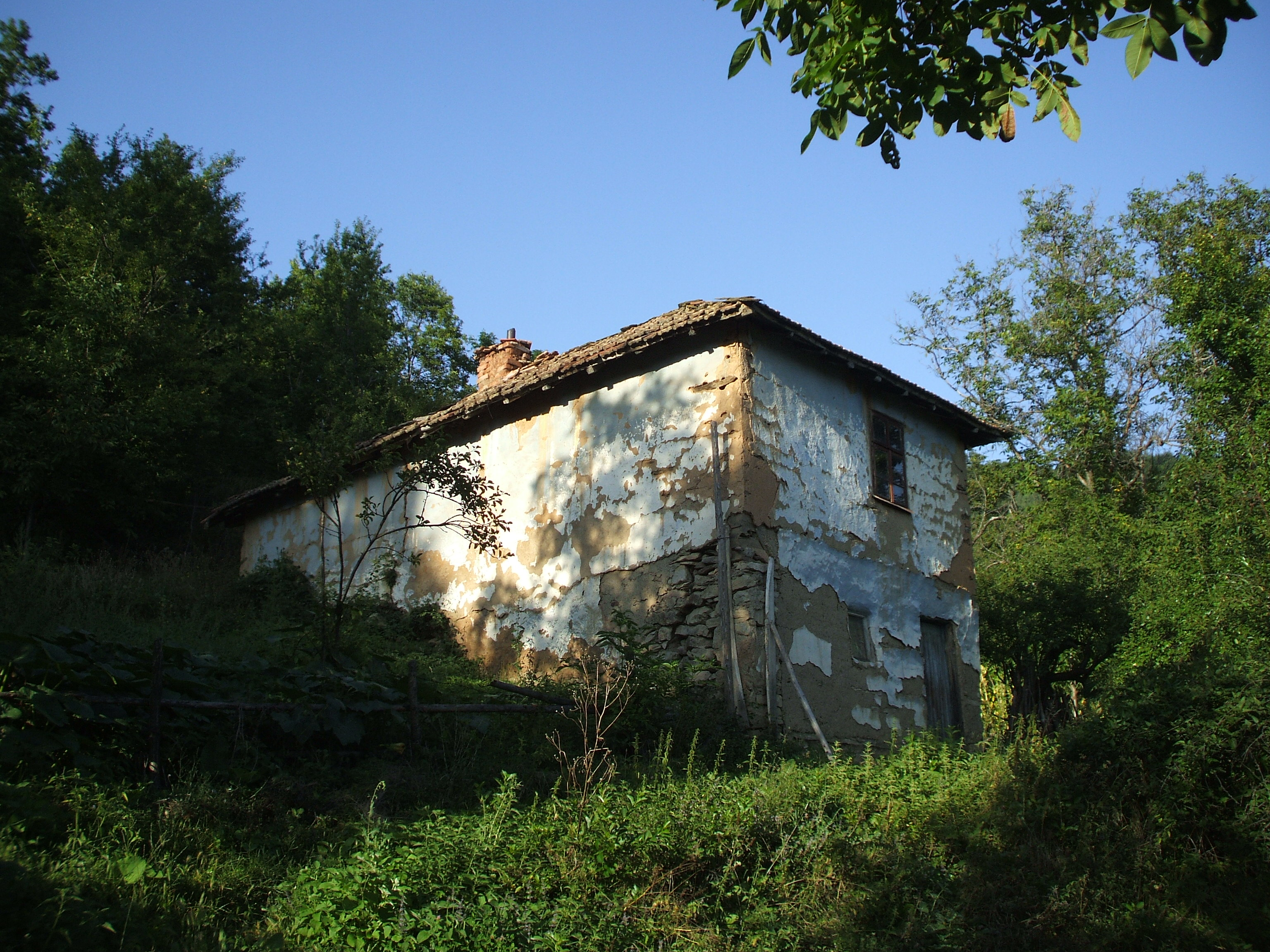
Abandoned adobe house

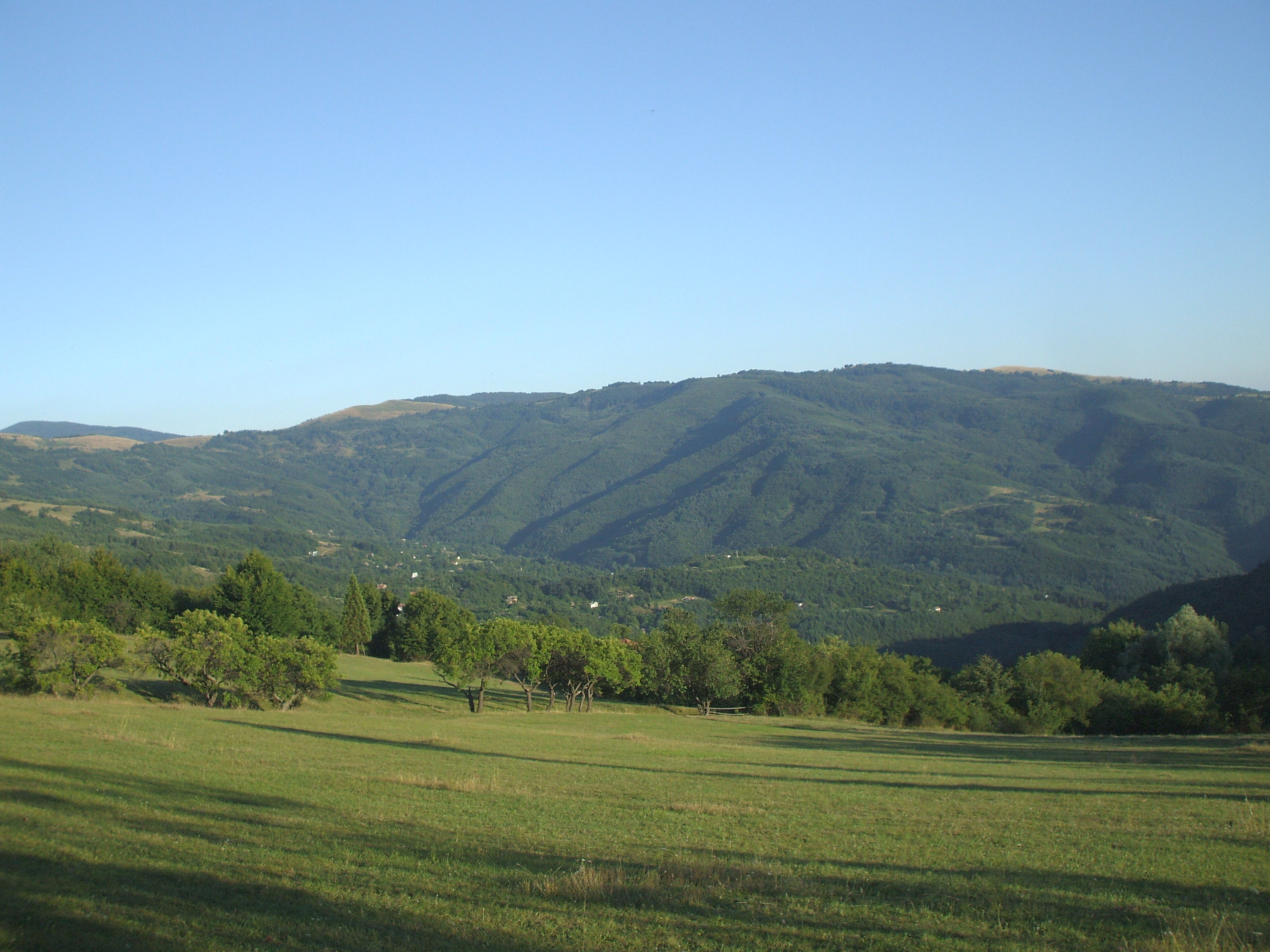
View of the village from Leške district

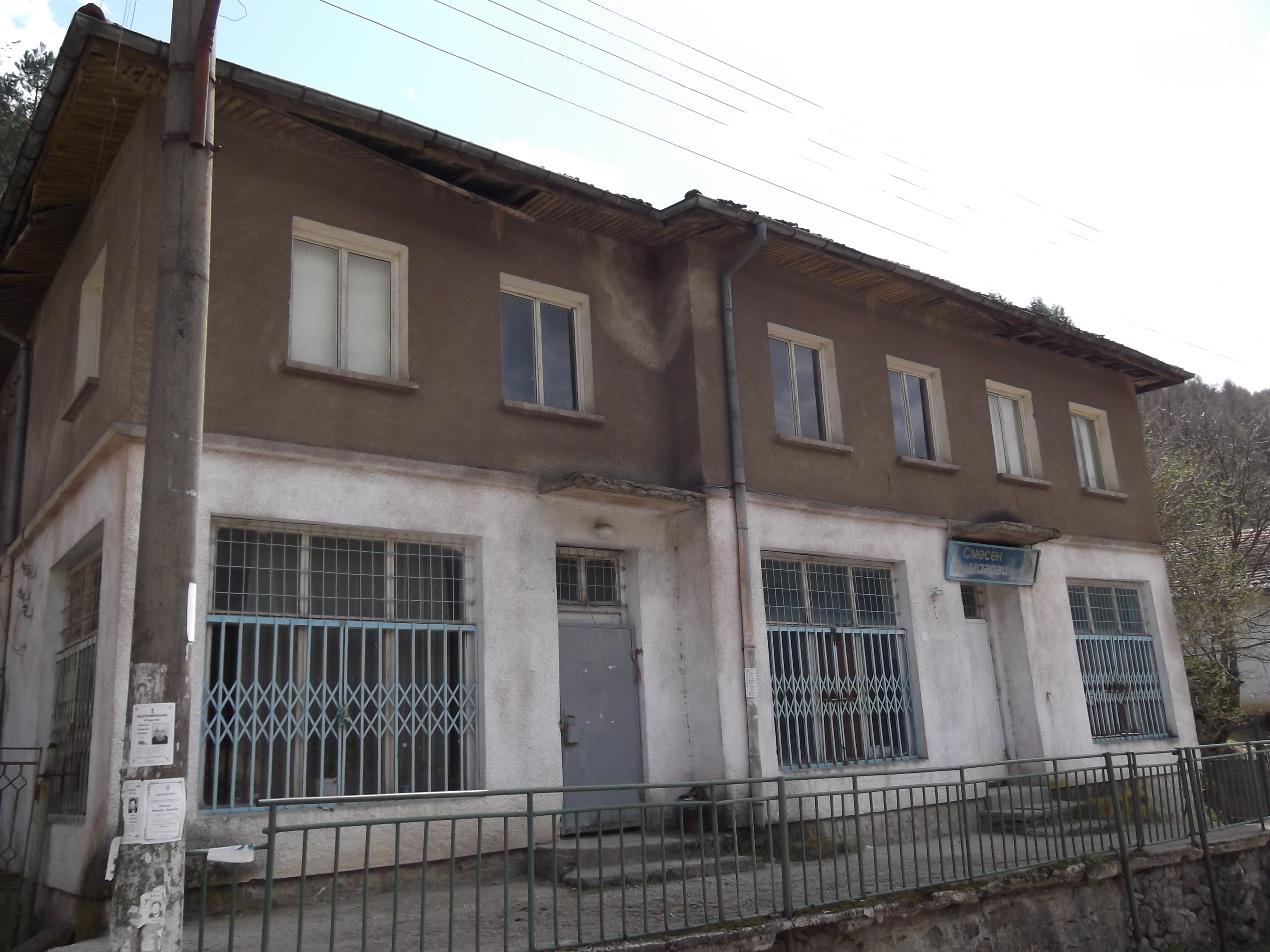
The old shop in the centre

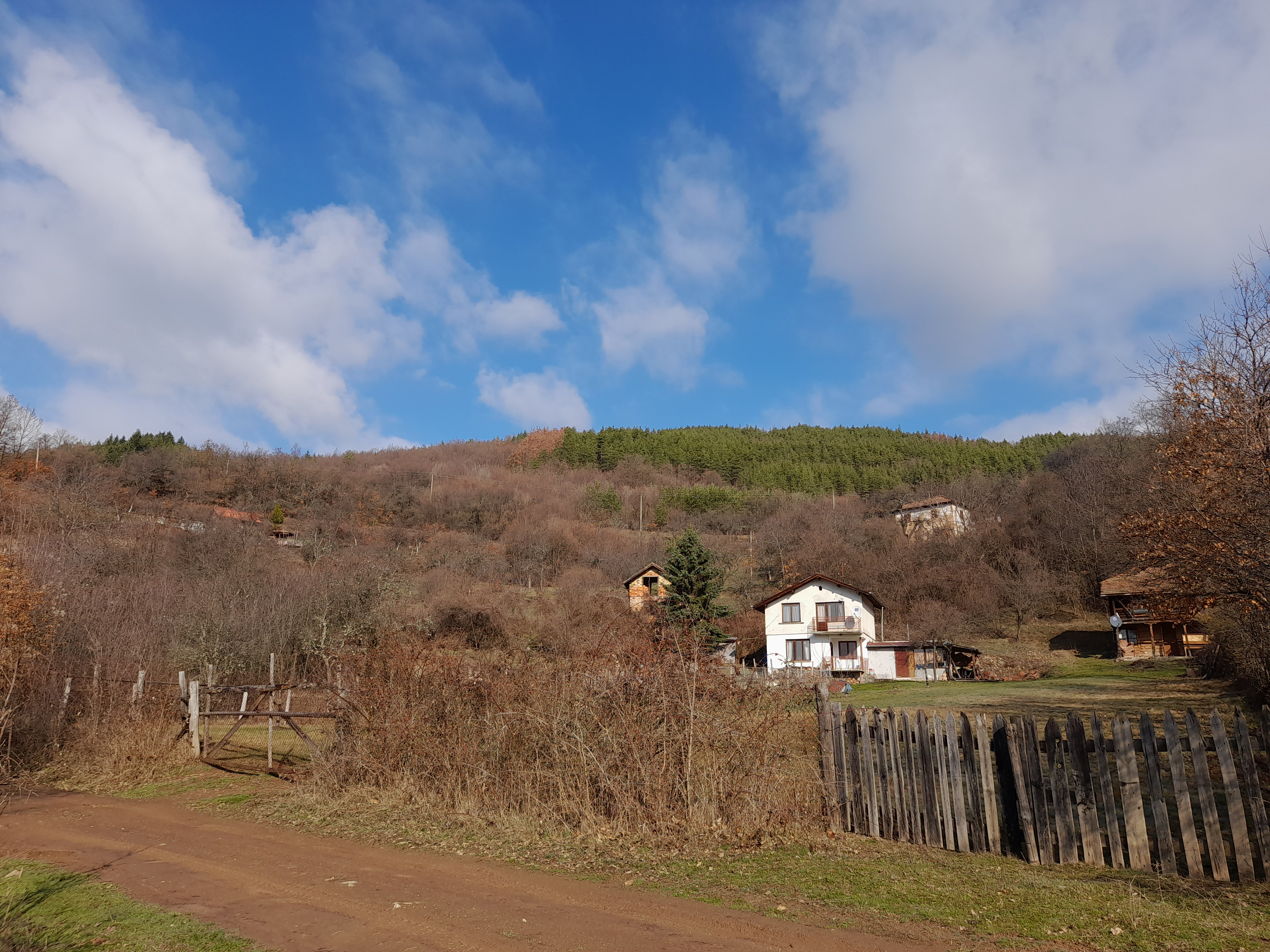
Popov kladenets district
