= Zasele =

Zasele Заселе
- Village
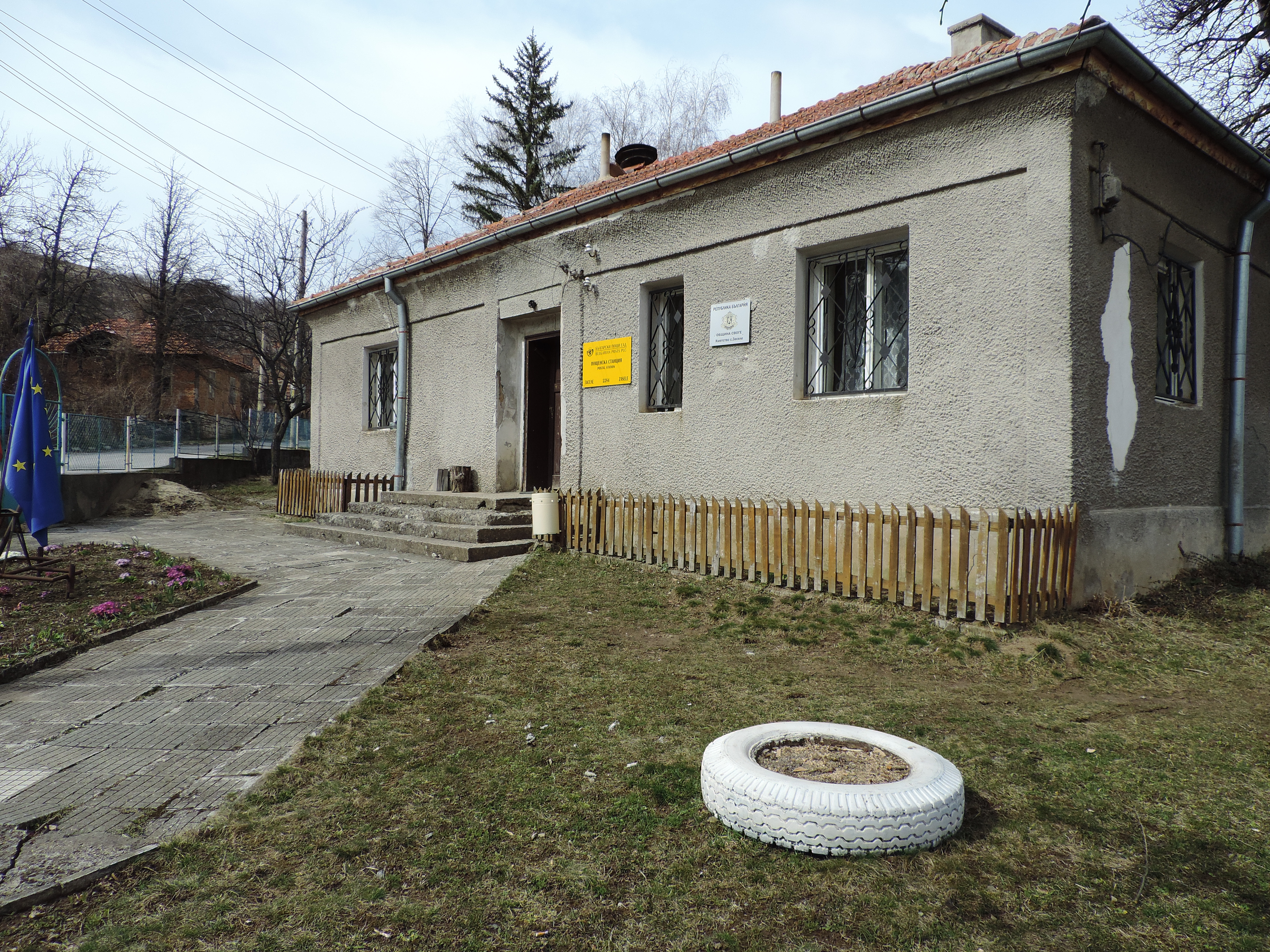
- City Hall and Post Office in Zasele

- Location within Bulgaria
- Coordinates: 43.0394°N 23.3294°E
- Country: Bulgaria
- Province: Sofia Province
- Municipality: Svoge
- Time zone: UTC+2 (EET)
  - Summer (DST): UTC+3 (EEST)

Zasele is a village in Svoge Municipality, Sofia Province, western Bulgaria.

Zasele Peak in Antarctica is named after the village.
