= Gara Lakatnik =

Gara Lakatnik Гара Лакатник
- Village
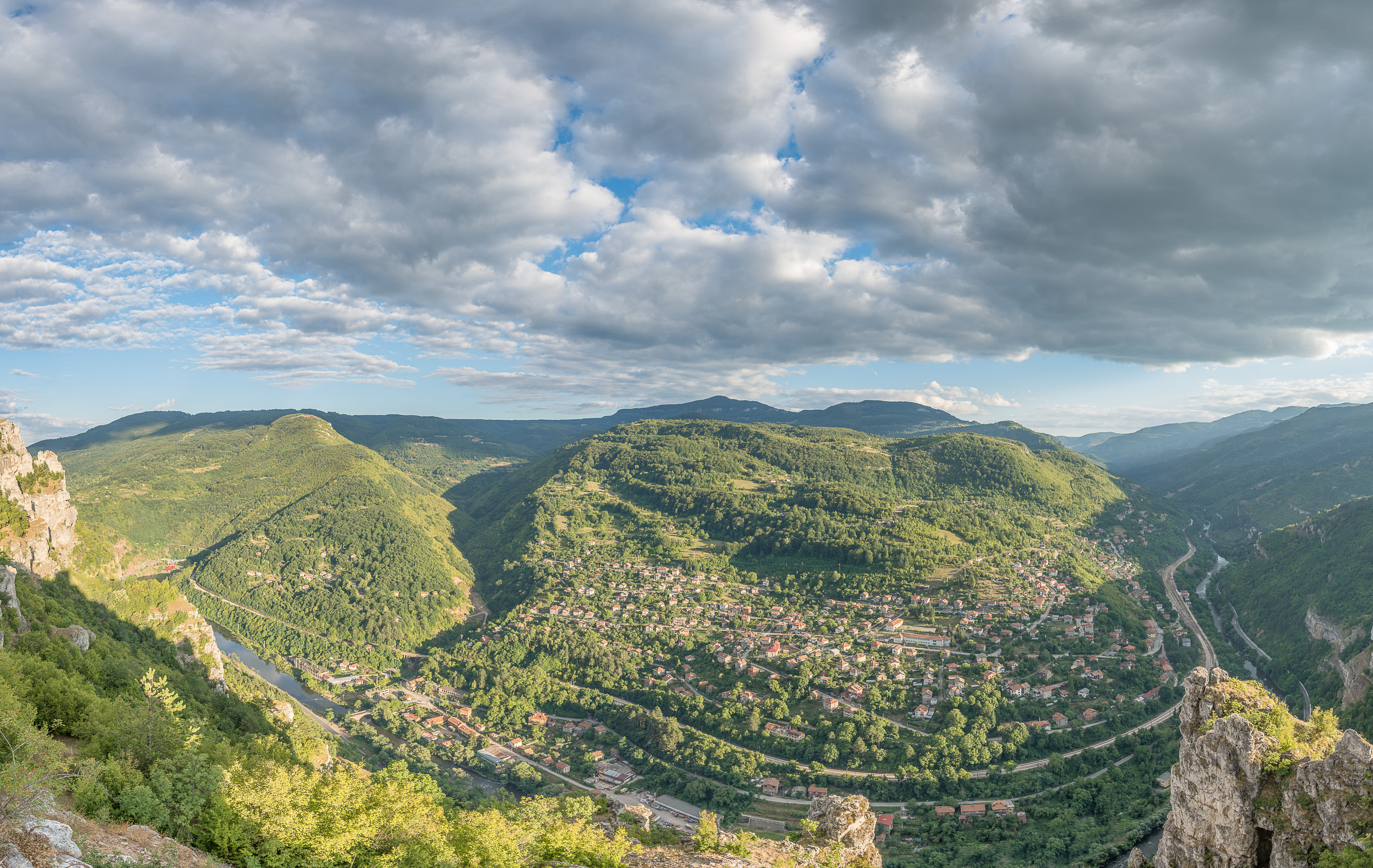
- A view of Gara Lakatnik and the Iskar Gorge

- Location of Gara Lakatnik, Bulgaria
- Coordinates: 43°5′0″N 23°23′0″E
- Country: Bulgaria
- Province: Sofia Province
- Municipality: Svoge

Government
  - Mayor: Ivan Iliev
- Elevation: 444 m (1,457 ft)

Population (2022)
  - Total: 1,184
- Time zone: UTC+2 (EET)
  - Summer (DST): UTC+3 (EEST)
- Postal Code: 2272
- Area codes: 07162 from Bulgaria, 003597162 from outside

Gara Lakatnik (Bulgarian: Гара Лакатник) is a village in Svoge Municipality, Sofia Province, western Bulgaria. It is situated in the Iskar Gorge of the Balkan Mountains.
