= Manastirishte, Sofia Province =

Manastirishte Манастирище
- Village
- Location within Bulgaria
- Coordinates: 43°34′N 23°39′E
- Country: Bulgaria
- Province: Sofia Province
- Municipality: Svoge
- Time zone: UTC+2 (EET)
  - Summer (DST): UTC+3 (EEST)

Manastirishte is a village in Svoge Municipality, Sofia Province, western Bulgaria.
