= Dobravitsa =

Dobravitsa Добравица
- Village
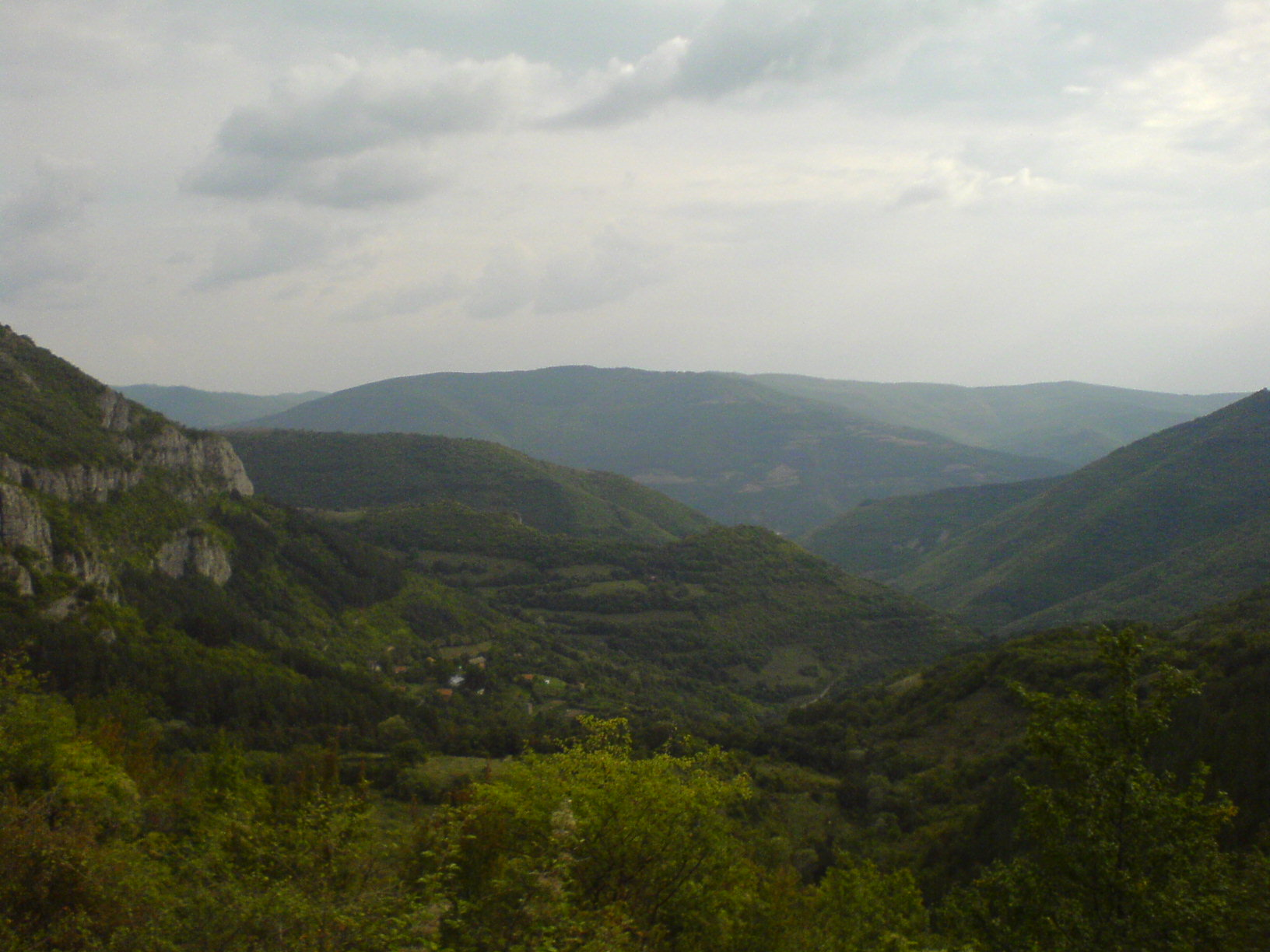
- Aerial view of the village

- Location within Bulgaria
- Coordinates: 43.0478°N 23.3761°E
- Country: Bulgaria
- Province: Sofia Province
- Municipality: Svoge
- Time zone: UTC+2 (EET)
  - Summer (DST): UTC+3 (EEST)

Dobravitsa is a village in Svoge Municipality, Sofia Province, western Bulgaria.

It is located in Ponor Mountain, part of the Western Stara Planina Mountains.

Many and varied natural landmarks can be seen near the village. The most famous of them are the Dobravitsa Skaklya waterfall, not far from the lower neighborhood of the village, and the rock phenomenon Stolo above the upper neighborhood.
