= Opletnya =

Opletnya Оплетня
- Village
- Location within Bulgaria
- Coordinates: 43.1000°N 23.4333°E
- Country: Bulgaria
- Province: Sofia Province
- Municipality: Svoge
- Time zone: UTC+2 (EET)
  - Summer (DST): UTC+3 (EEST)

Opletnya is a village in Svoge Municipality, Sofia Province, western Bulgaria.

The village is located 24 km northeast of the Bulgarian capital, Svoge. It is situated in a mountainous region, within the Iskar River valley at an altitude of 421 meters. The area falls within the temperate climate zone, with cold winters, cool summers, and early autumn. The permanent population is around 88 people, with the village connected to surrounding settlements by bus and railway. The village has stores, a community center, and water and electricity systems. According to legend, the name of the village is derived from the braided hair of a young woman twisted around the largest tree. The village is home to several natural attractions, such as the Lakatnishki rocks, Skaklya waterfall, and the Vazov Eco Path.
