= Bov, Bulgaria =

Bov Бов
- Village
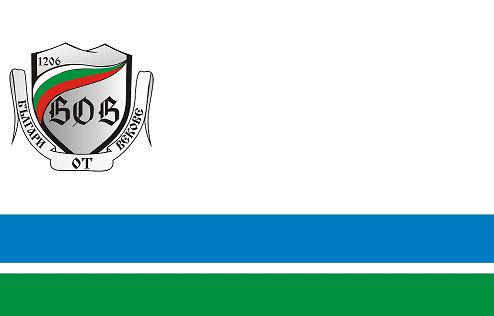
- Flag

- Location in Bulgaria
- Coordinates: 43.033°N 23.378°E
- Country: Bulgaria
- Province: Sofia Province
- Municipality: Svoge

Area
  - Total: 246 km^{2} (95 sq mi)
- Elevation: 908 m (2,979 ft)

Population (2015-03-15)
  - Total: 101
- Time zone: UTC+2 (EET)
  - Summer (DST): UTC+3 (EEST)

Bov (Bulgarian: Бов [bɔf]) is a village in Svoge Municipality, Sofia Province, western Bulgaria. The village has a train station called Gara Bov on the train line Sofia - Mezdra located 2 km west of the village. During the years the train station turned into in a separate settlement.

== Honours ==
Bov Point on Brabant Island, Antarctica is named after the village.
