= Levishte =

Levishte Левище
- Village
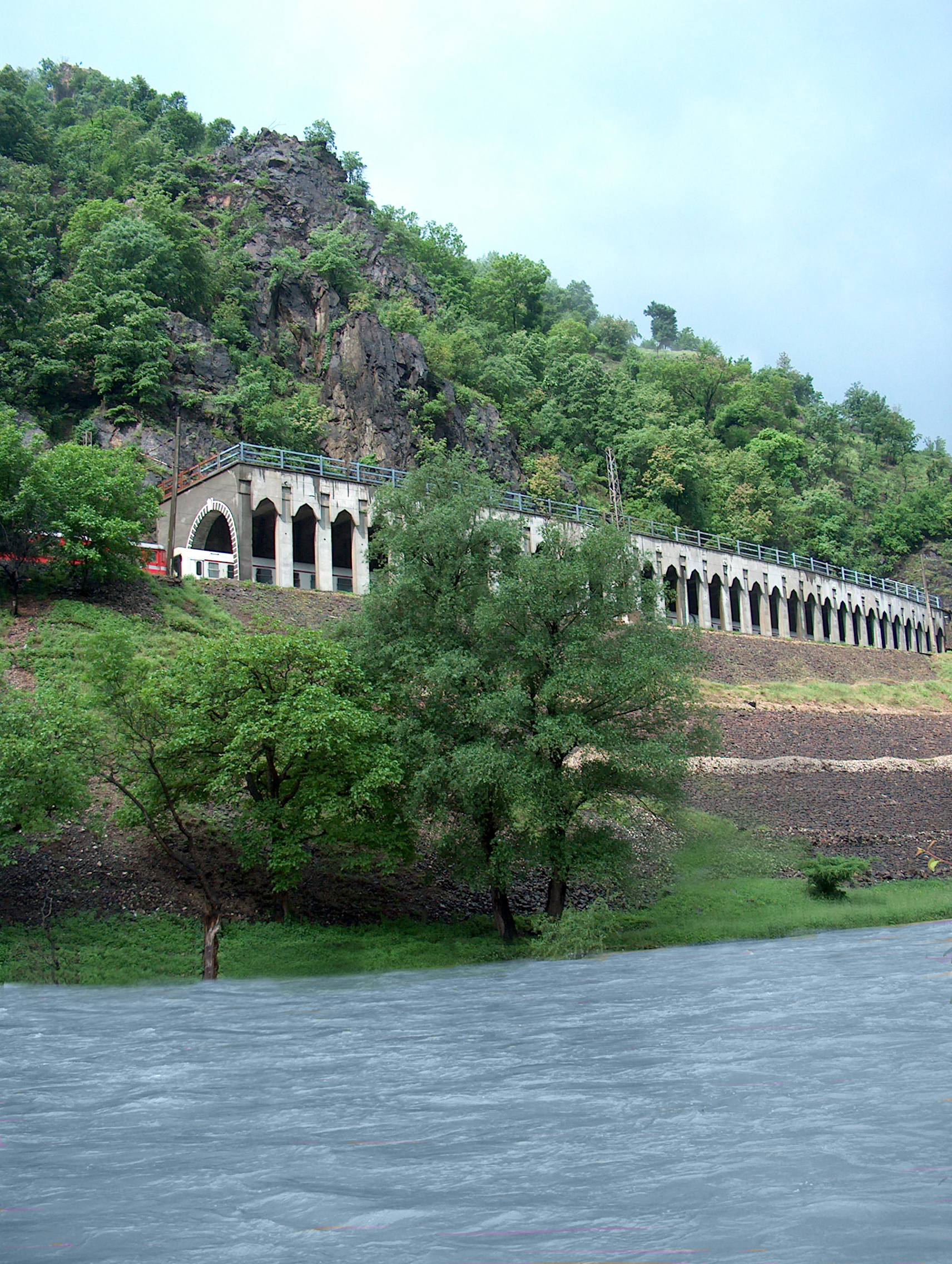
- Interactive map of Levishte
- Coordinates: 43.0500°N 23.2700°E
- Country: Bulgaria
- Province: Sofia Province
- Municipality: Svoge
- Time zone: UTC+2 (EET)
  - Summer (DST): UTC+3 (EEST)

Levishte is a village in Svoge Municipality, Sofia Province, western Bulgaria.
