= Dobarchin =

Dobarchin Добърчин
- Village
- Location within Bulgaria
- Coordinates: 42.9833°N 23.2833°E
- Country: Bulgaria
- Province: Sofia Province
- Municipality: Svoge
- Time zone: UTC+2 (EET)
  - Summer (DST): UTC+3 (EEST)

Dobarchin is a village in Svoge Municipality, Sofia Province, western Bulgaria.
