= Vlado Trichkov =

Vlado Trichkov Владо Тричков
- Village
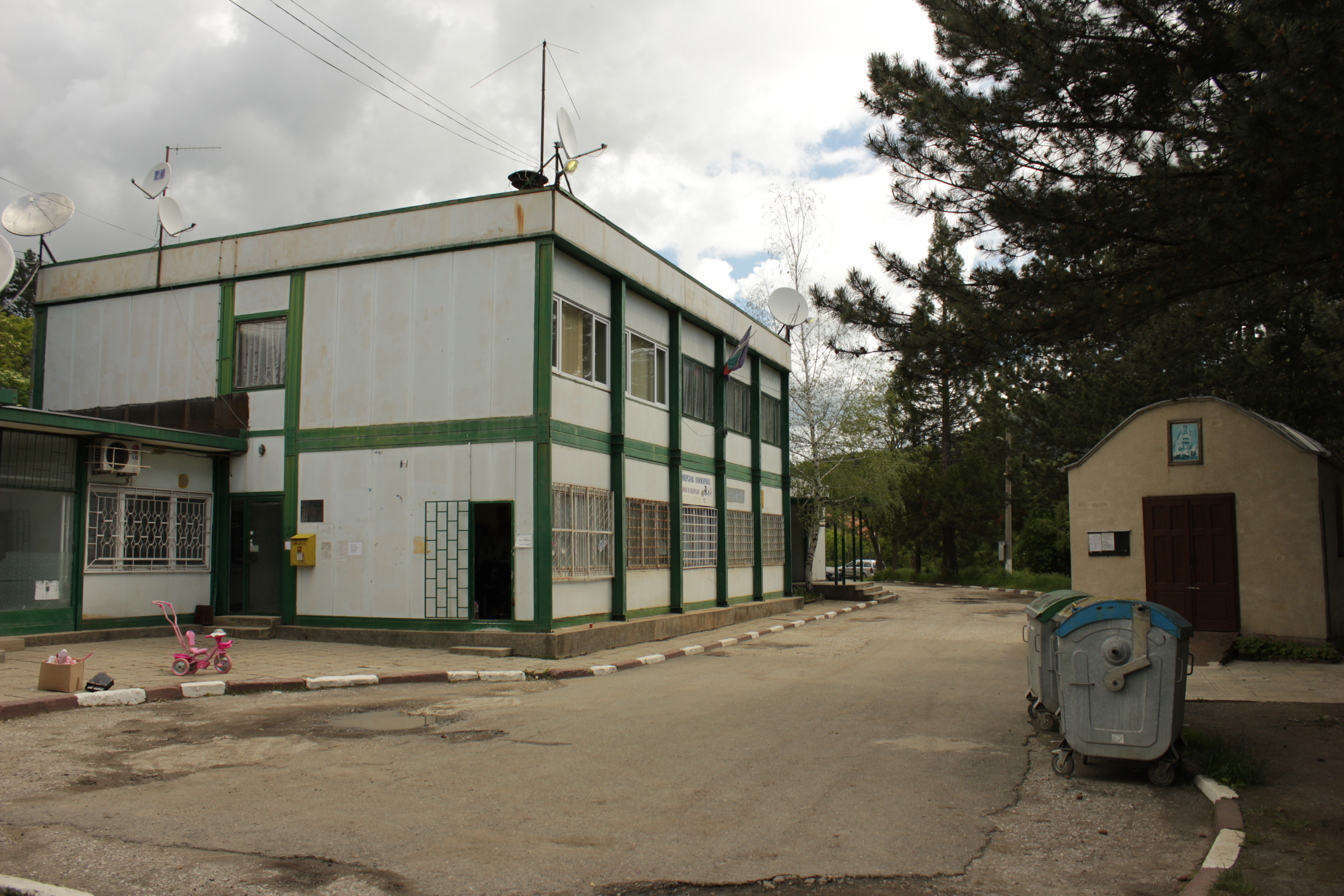

- Location within Bulgaria
- Coordinates: 42.8667°N 23.3667°E
- Country: Bulgaria
- Province: Sofia Province
- Municipality: Svoge

Area
  - Total: 18,969 km^{2} (7,324 sq mi)

Population (15 07 2022)
  - Total: 1,732
- Time zone: UTC+2 (EET)
  - Summer (DST): UTC+3 (EEST)

Vlado Trichkov is a village in Svoge Municipality, Sofia Province, western Bulgaria.
