= Svidnya =

Svidnya Свидня
- Village
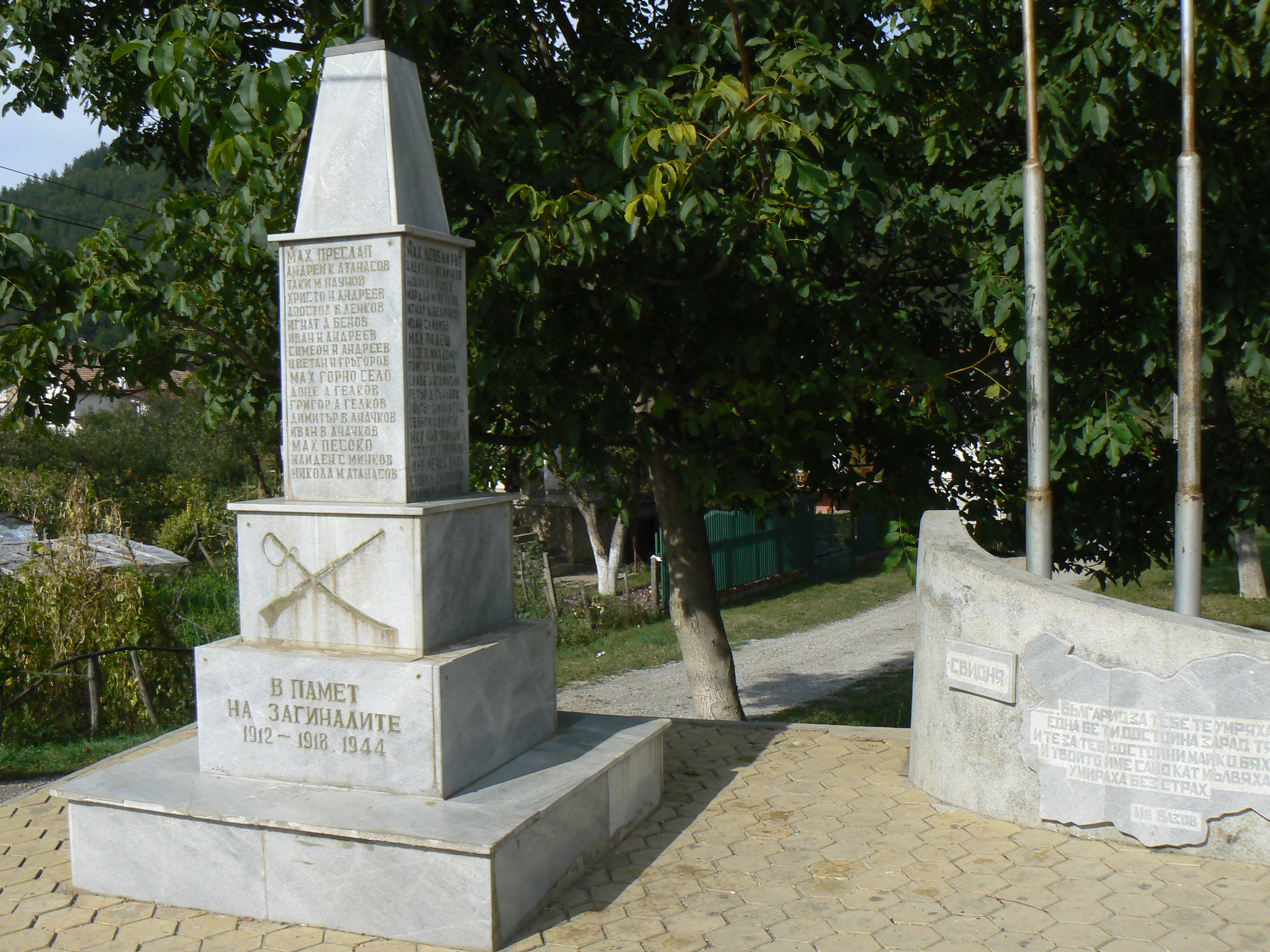
- War memorial in village Svidnya, Bulgaria

- Location within Bulgaria
- Coordinates: 42.9500°N 23.2667°E
- Country: Bulgaria
- Province: Sofia Province
- Municipality: Svoge
- Time zone: UTC+2 (EET)
  - Summer (DST): UTC+3 (EEST)

Svidnya is a village in Svoge Municipality, Sofia Province, western Bulgaria.
