= Svoge Municipality =

Coordinates: 43°36′00″N 23°34′59″E

Svoge Municipality Община Своге
- Municipality
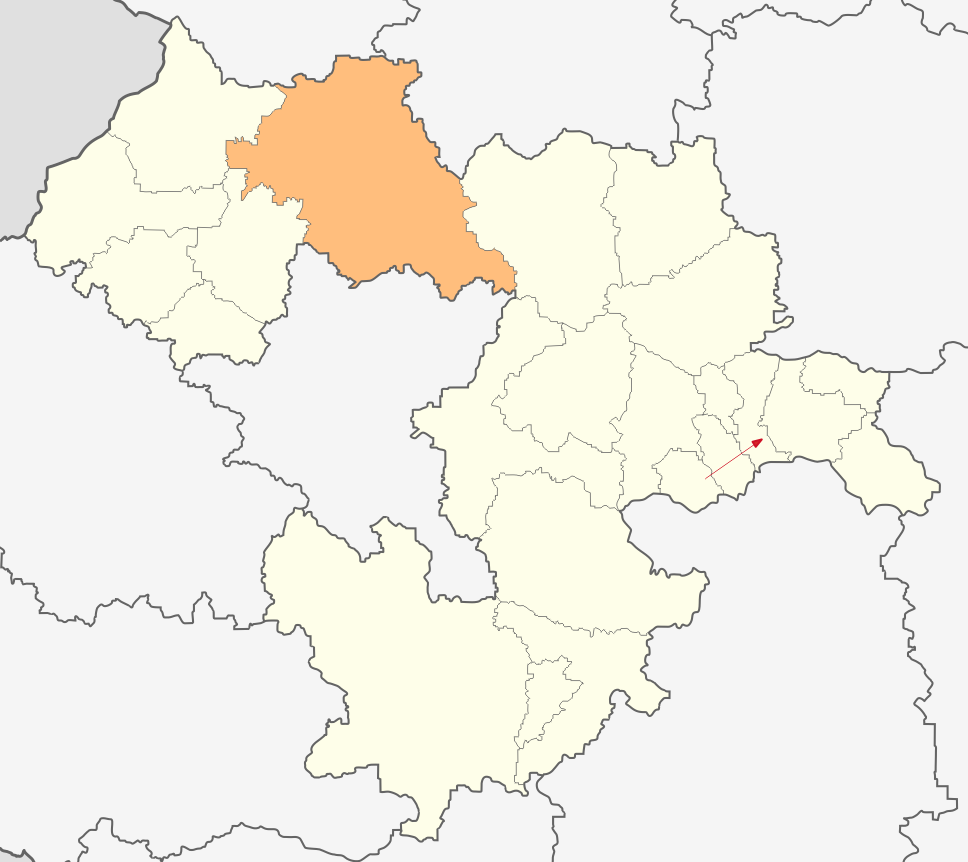
- Country: Bulgaria
- Province: Sofia Province
- Seat: Svoge

Svoge Municipality (Bulgarian: Община Своге, romanized: Obština Svoge) is located in western Bulgaria and is a part of Sofia Province. It covers a territory of 868,6 km^{2} and has a population of around 21,000 people, more than 1/3 of which lives in the town of Svoge itself. The municipality also includes 37 villages. The municipality is one of the largest by area in the country. It neighbours Montana Province, Vratsa Province & Sofia (City of) province.

== Demographics ==
=== Religion ===
According to the latest Bulgarian census of 2011, the religious composition of Svoge Municipality was the following:

Religious composition of Svoge Municipality
Orthodox Christianity	71.33%
Catholicism	0.25%
Protestantism	0.15%
Islam	0.06%
Other	0.05%
No religion	0.99%
Not stated	2.1%
Unknown	25.0%

== Populated places ==
- Bakyovo
- Batulia
- Bov
- Breze
- Brezovdol
- Bukovets
- Dobarchin
- Dobravitsa
- Druzhevo
- Elenov dol
- Gabrovnitsa
- Gara Bov
- Gara Lakatnik
- Goubislav
- Iskrets
- Lakatnik
- Leskovdol
- Lukovo
- Levishte
- Manastirishte
- Milanovo
- Ogoya
- Opletnya
- Osenovlag
- Rebrovo
- Redina
- Svindya
- Svoge
- Thompson
- Tseretsel
- Tserovo
- Vlado Trichkov
- Yablanitsa
- Zanoge
- Zasele
- Zavidovtsi
- Zhelen
- Zimevitsa
