= Batulia =

Batulia Батулия
- Village
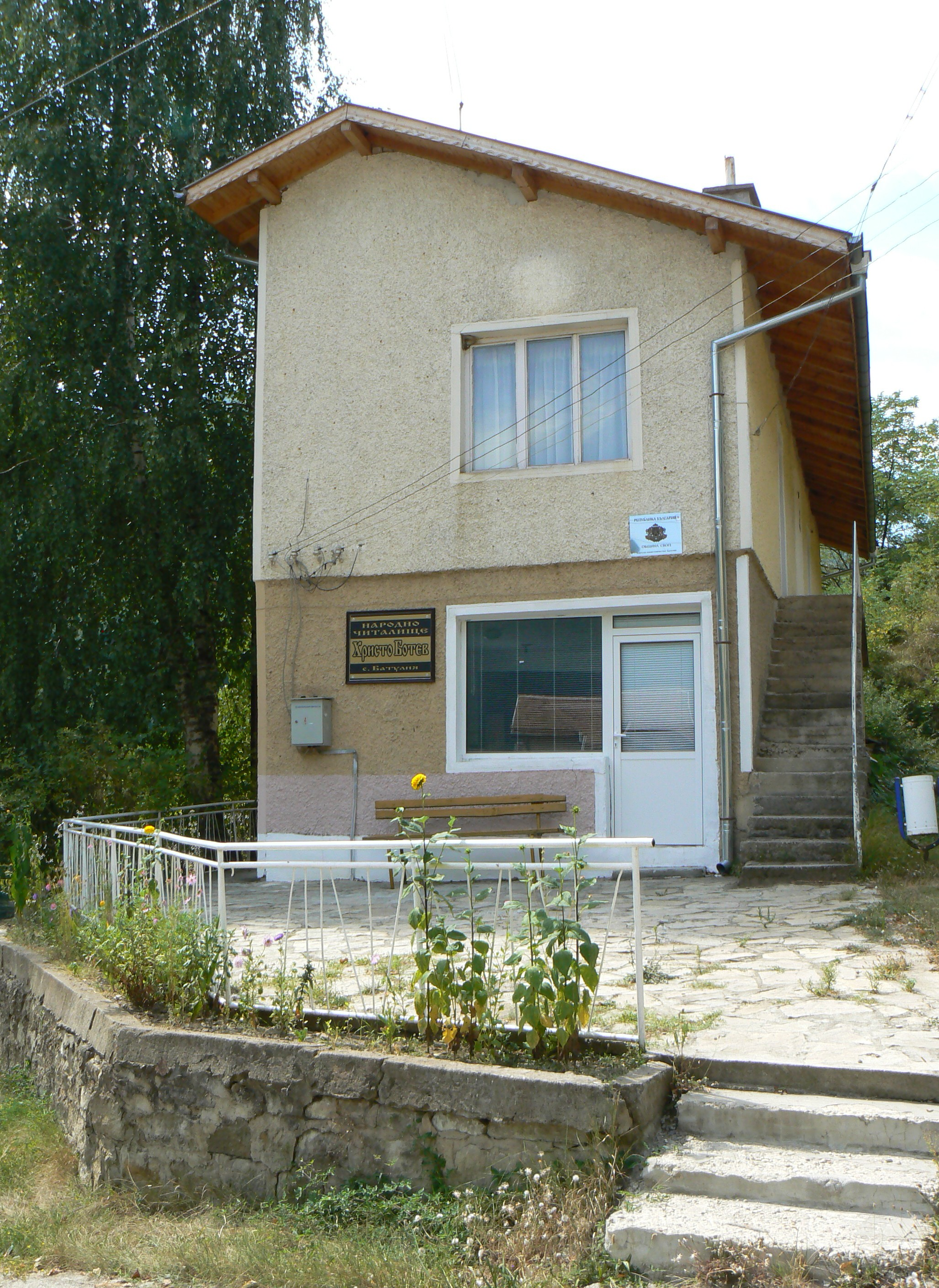
- Village library

- Location within Bulgaria
- Coordinates: 42.8833°N 23.4333°E
- Country: Bulgaria
- Province: Sofia Province
- Municipality: Svoge
- Time zone: UTC+2 (EET)
  - Summer (DST): UTC+3 (EEST)

Batulia is a village in Svoge Municipality, Sofia Province, western Bulgaria.

In 1944, the British intelligence officer Frank Thompson died in Batulia fighting the Bulgarian gendarmerie.
