= Bakyovo =

Bakyovo Бакьово
- Village
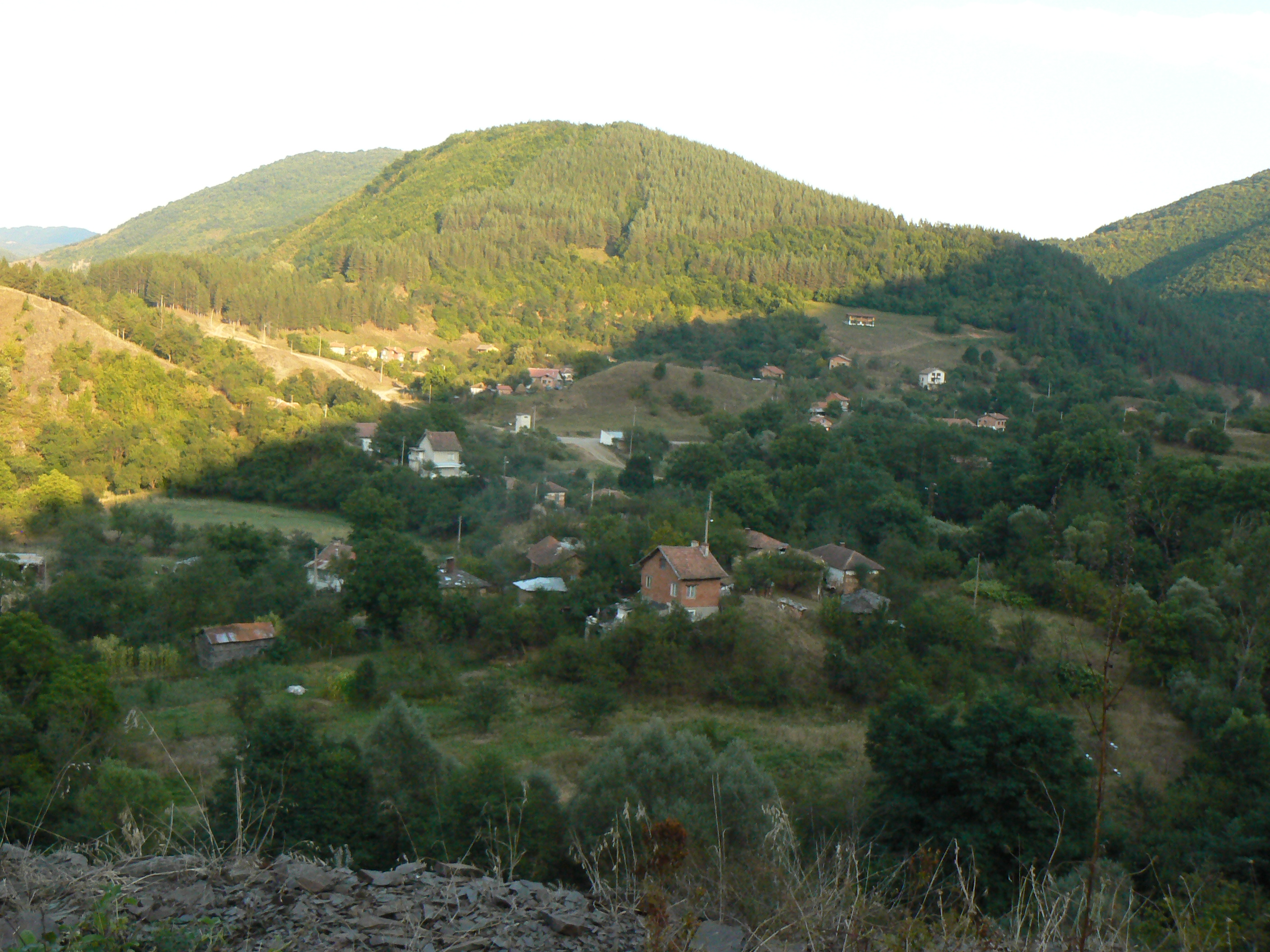
- Aerial view of the village

- Location within Bulgaria
- Coordinates: 42.8667°N 23.4667°E
- Country: Bulgaria
- Province: Sofia Province
- Municipality: Svoge
- Time zone: UTC+2 (EET)
  - Summer (DST): UTC+3 (EEST)

Bakyovo is a village in Svoge Municipality, Sofia Province, western Bulgaria.
