= Bukovets, Sofia Province =

Bukovets Буковец
- Village
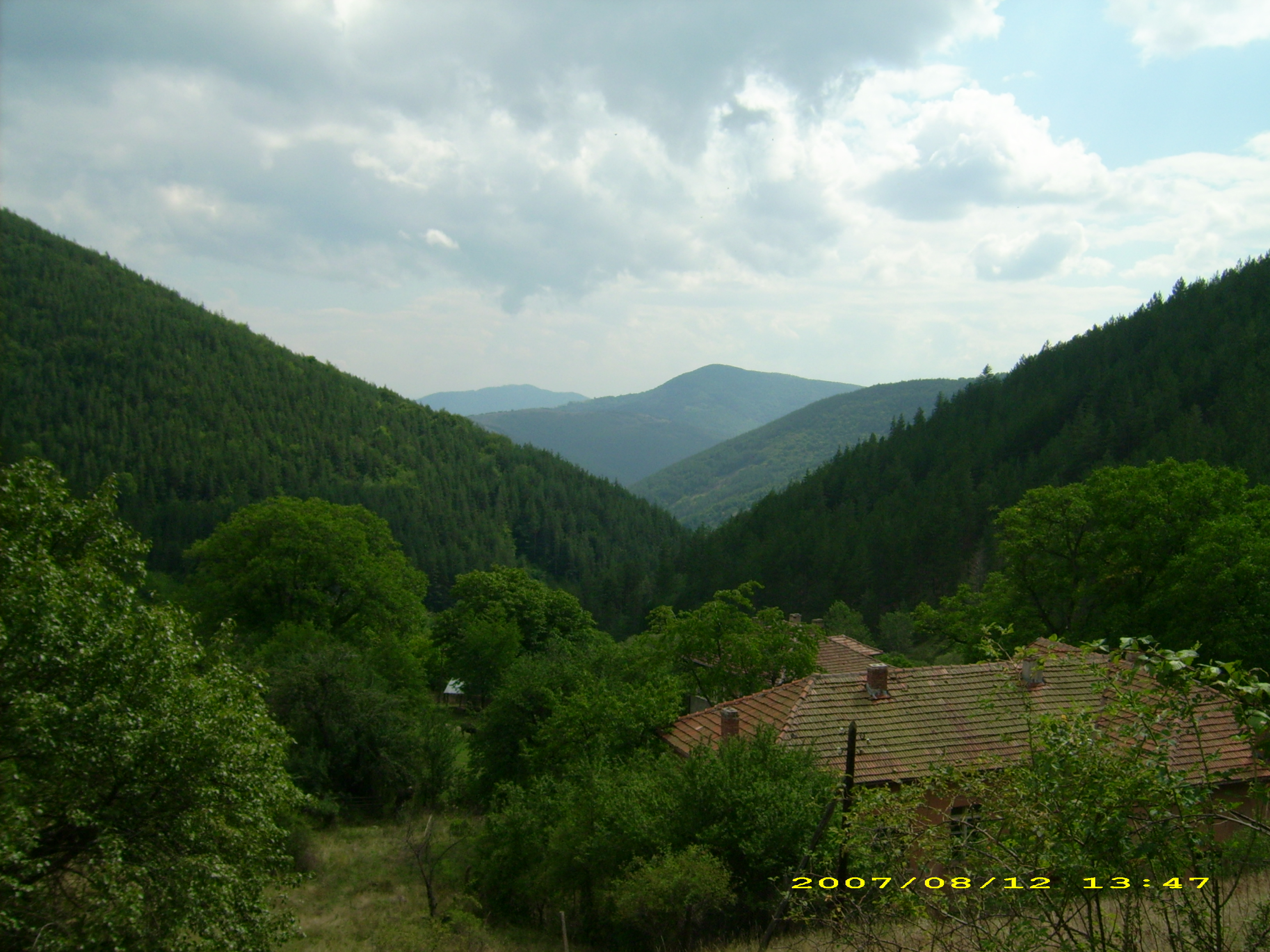
- Bukovets Sofia District.jpg

- Location within Bulgaria
- Coordinates: 42.9333°N 23.4833°E
- Country: Bulgaria
- Province: Sofia Province
- Municipality: Svoge
- Time zone: UTC+2 (EET)
  - Summer (DST): UTC+3 (EEST)

Bukovets is a village in Svoge Municipality, Sofia Province, western Bulgaria.

It is known for its Saint Nicholas church, built by Crusaders in the 12th century.
