= Rabrovo, Valandovo =

Rabrovo Раброво
- Village
- Location within North Macedonia
- Coordinates: 41.321041°N 22.578814°E
- Country: North Macedonia
- Region: Southeastern
- Municipality: Valandovo

Population (2002)
  - Total: 274
- Time zone: UTC+1 (CET)
  - Summer (DST): UTC+2 (CEST)
- Website: .

Rabrovo (Macedonian: Раброво) is a village in the municipality of Valandovo, North Macedonia. It is located just east of Valandovo town.

== Demographics ==
According to the 2002 census, the village had a total of 274 inhabitants. Ethnic groups in the village include:

- Macedonians 271
- Serbs 3

As of 2021, the village of Rabrovo has 248 inhabitants and the ethnic composition was the following:

- Macedonians – 230
- Serbs – 2
- others – 1
- Person without Data - 15
