= Murgash =

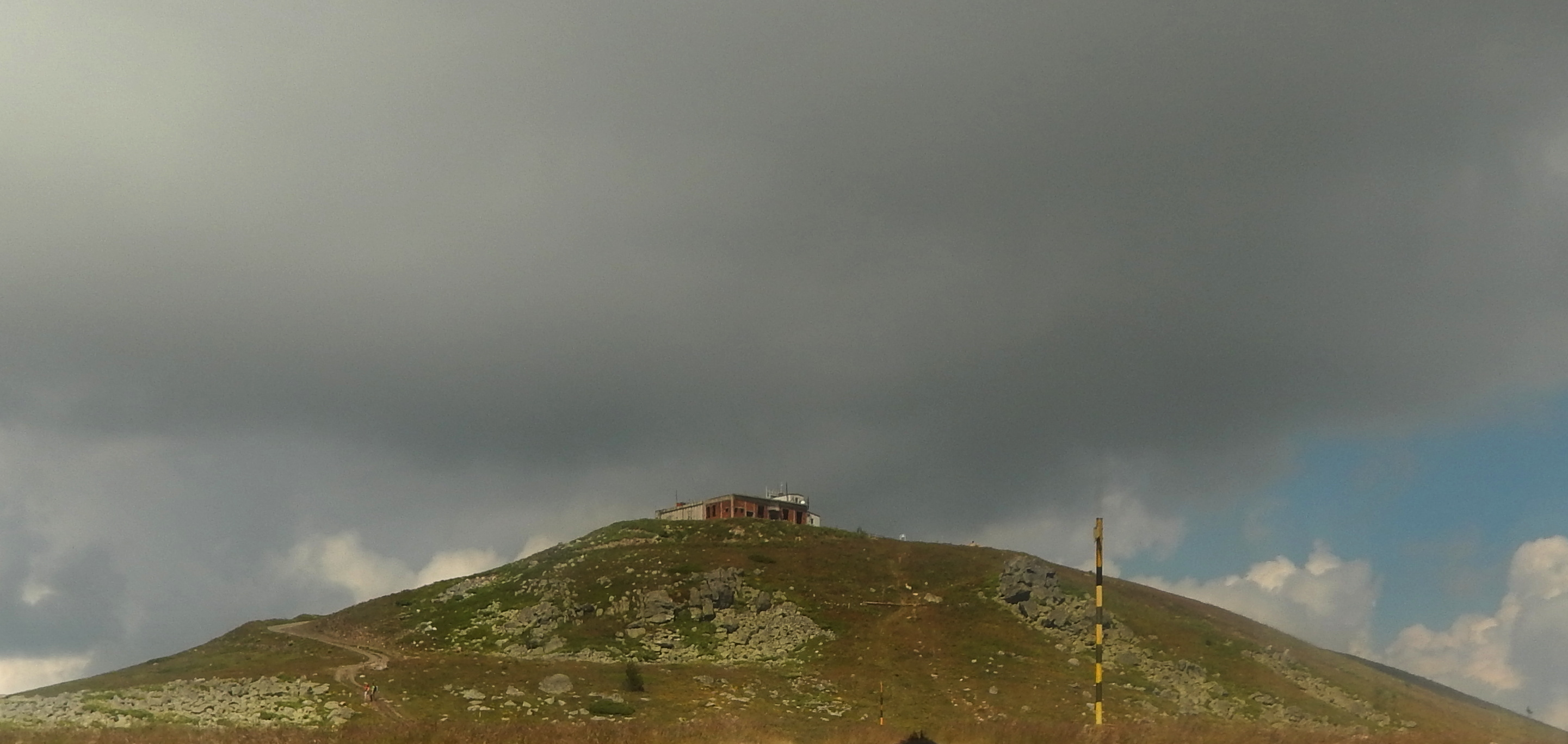
- View toward Murgash peak

Highest point
- Elevation: 1,687 m (5,535 ft)
- Coordinates: 42°49′59″N 23°40′06″E

Geography
- Location within Bulgaria
- Location: Murgash peak's location on the map of Bulgaria
- Country: Bulgaria
- Region: Sofia Province
- Parent range: Balkan Mountains

Murgash is a peak in Bulgaria, in the Balkan Mountains mountain range. The peak is located in the East part of Murgash massive, with an altitude of 1,687 m (5,535 ft) above sea level.

The peak consists of Paleozoic sediment and has a dome-shaped structure with steep slopes. Out of the summit of the peak stream two rivers – Baltuiska reka and Eleshnica river. The peak is an object of both international and national tourism. The Murgash touristic hut is located southwest of the peak with an altitude of 1490 meters.

The Eleshnishki monastery is located near the west foot of the Murgash peak.

In 1953, on Murgash peak a meteorological station was built and is still active.

== Views from the peak ==
=== East ===
East from Murgash peak lies a long horizon, which allows tourists to enjoy a pleasant sunrise.

=== South East ===
From the peak, when looking toward South East, the Rhodope Mountain range can be seen.

=== South ===
Toward the South, Sofia, and Rila Mountain, along with Musala peak can be seen.

=== West ===
To the West, when the weather is clear you can see Serbian land and mountains.

== Climate ==
Murgash has a subarctic climate (Köppen Dfc), bordering on humid continental climate (Köppen climate classificationDfb).

Climate data for Murgash Peak, 1991-2020 (elevation 1687m)
Month	Jan	Feb	Mar	Apr	May	Jun	Jul	Aug	Sep	Oct	Nov	Dec	Year
Record high °C (°F)	13.6 (56.5)	12.8 (55.0)	17.2 (63.0)	20.4 (68.7)	24.8 (76.6)	25.1 (77.2)	31.0 (87.8)	29.5 (85.1)	25.2 (77.4)	24.1 (75.4)	20.5 (68.9)	14.5 (58.1)	31.0 (87.8)
Mean daily maximum °C (°F)	−1.9 (28.6)	−1.6 (29.1)	1.3 (34.3)	6.3 (43.3)	11.3 (52.3)	14.9 (58.8)	17.2 (63.0)	17.8 (64.0)	13.2 (55.8)	8.9 (48.0)	4.1 (39.4)	−0.5 (31.1)	7.6 (45.6)
Daily mean °C (°F)	−4.6 (23.7)	−4.3 (24.3)	−1.6 (29.1)	2.9 (37.2)	7.8 (46.0)	11.5 (52.7)	13.6 (56.5)	14.0 (57.2)	9.6 (49.3)	5.4 (41.7)	1.3 (34.3)	−3.1 (26.4)	4.4 (39.9)
Mean daily minimum °C (°F)	−7.0 (19.4)	−6.9 (19.6)	−4.3 (24.3)	0.2 (32.4)	5.0 (41.0)	8.6 (47.5)	10.5 (50.9)	11.0 (51.8)	6.9 (44.4)	2.9 (37.2)	−1.1 (30.0)	−5.5 (22.1)	1.7 (35.1)
Record low °C (°F)	−26.3 (−15.3)	−25.1 (−13.2)	−19.6 (−3.3)	−13.5 (7.7)	−4.9 (23.2)	−1.5 (29.3)	1.0 (33.8)	0.2 (32.4)	−3.8 (25.2)	−11.3 (11.7)	−17.6 (0.3)	−23.2 (−9.8)	−26.3 (−15.3)
Average precipitation mm (inches)	39 (1.5)	38 (1.5)	46 (1.8)	56 (2.2)	110 (4.3)	106 (4.2)	88 (3.5)	69 (2.7)	65 (2.6)	53 (2.1)	34 (1.3)	40 (1.6)	744 (29.3)
Average precipitation days (≥ 1.0 mm)	9	9	9	9	12	10	8	6	7	6	7	9	101
Mean monthly sunshine hours	99	95	133	162	198	238	287	292	208	157	108	92	2,069
Source: NOAA
