= Zhelen =

Village in Sofia Province, Bulgaria

Zhelen Желен
- Village
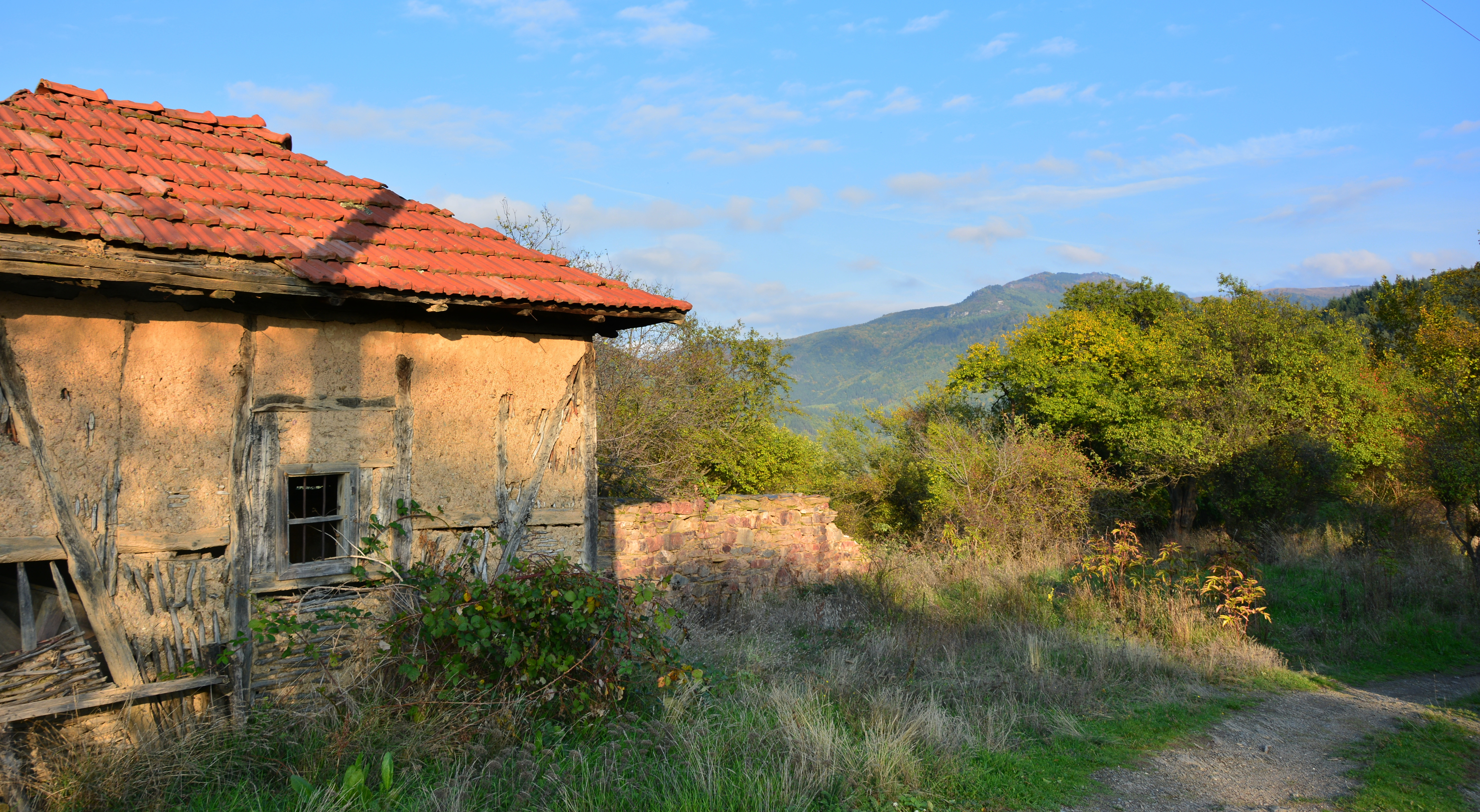
- image of zhelen

- Location within Bulgaria
- Coordinates: 42.9833°N 23.3833°E
- Country: Bulgaria
- Province: Sofia Province
- Municipality: Svoge
- Time zone: UTC+2 (EET)
  - Summer (DST): UTC+3 (EEST)

Zhelen is a village in Svoge Municipality, Sofia Province, western Bulgaria.
