= Ogoya =

Ogoya Огоя
- Village
- Location in Bulgaria
- Coordinates: 42.906888°N 23.521723°E
- Country: Bulgaria
- Province: Sofia Province
- Municipality: Svoge

Population (2016)
  - Total: 48
- Time zone: UTC+2 (EET)
  - Summer (DST): UTC+3 (EEST)

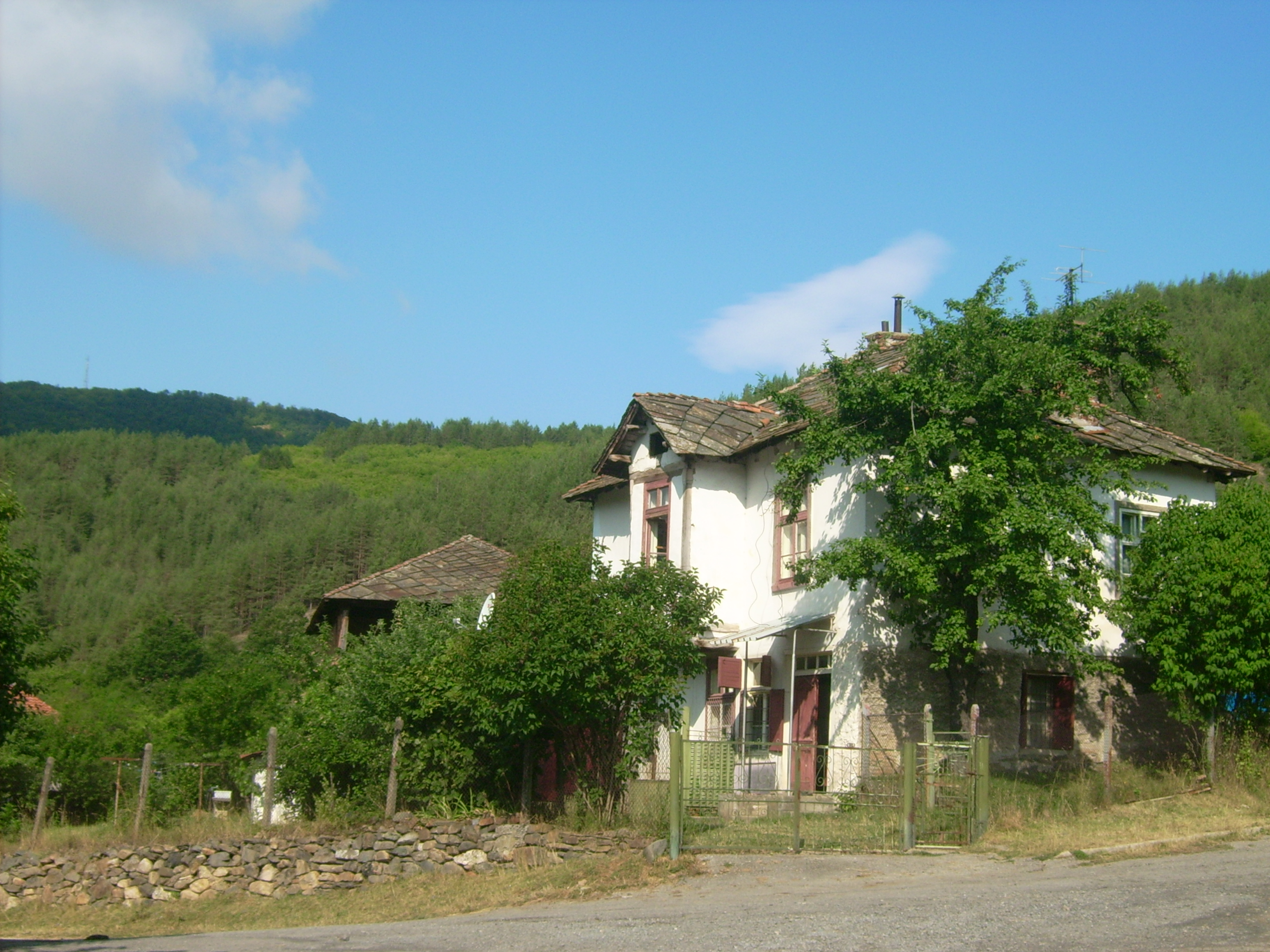
Village Ogoya

Ogoya is a village in Svoge Municipality, Sofia Province, western Bulgaria.
