= Gara Bov =

Gara Bov Гара Бов
- Village
- Location in Bulgaria
- Coordinates: 43.021°N 23.352°E
- Country: Bulgaria
- Province: Sofia Province
- Municipality: Svoge

Area
  - Total: 849 km^{2} (328 sq mi)
- Elevation: 535 m (1,755 ft)

Population (2015-03-15)
  - Total: 984
- Time zone: UTC+2 (EET)
  - Summer (DST): UTC+3 (EEST)

Gara Bov is a village in Svoge Municipality, Sofia Province, western Bulgaria.
