= Iskar Gorge =

Coordinates: 43°2′36″N 23°21′10″E

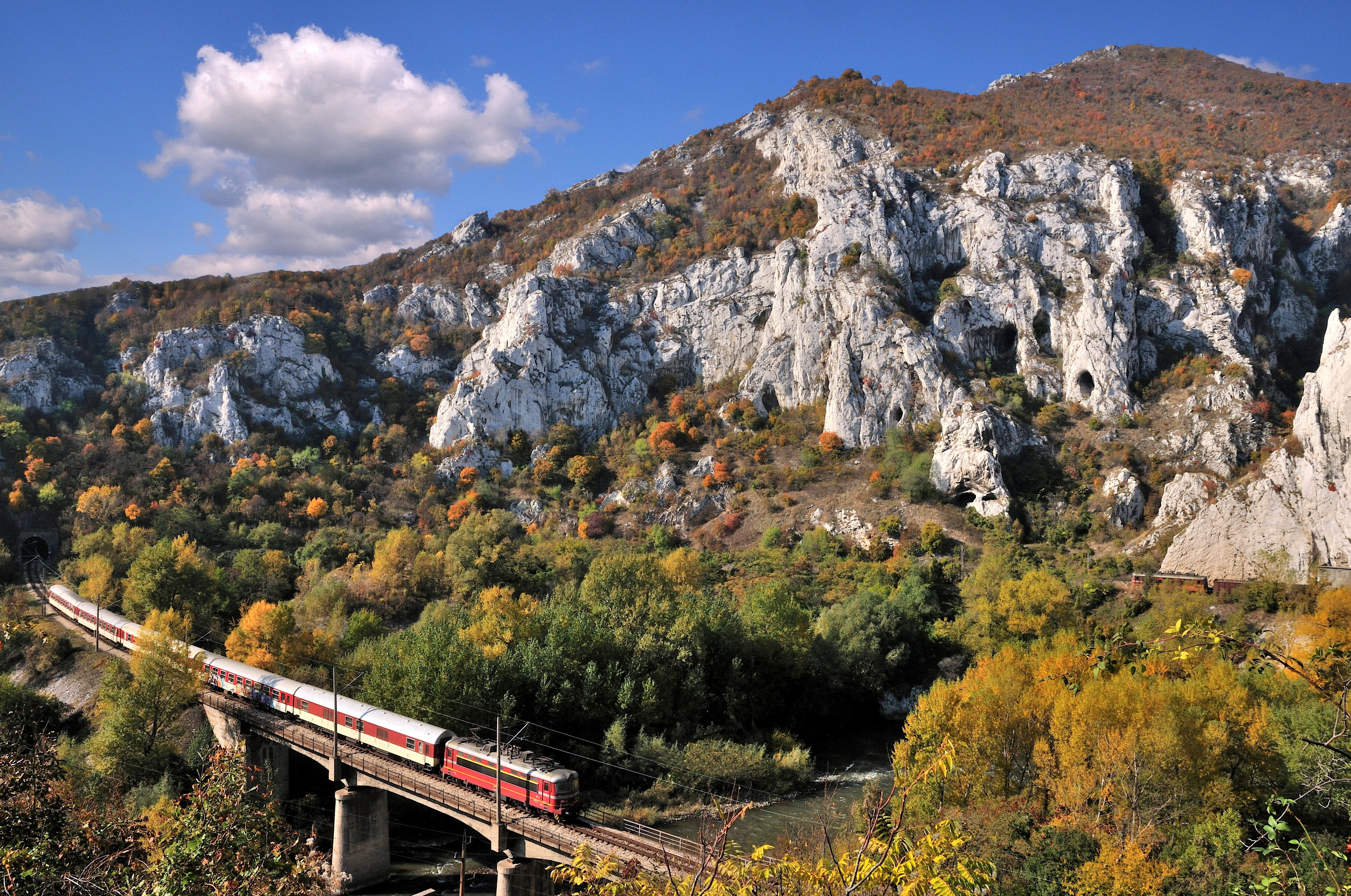
The Iskar Gorge

The Iskăr Gorge is a 70 km (43 mi) gorge passing through the Balkan Mountains (Stara Planina) in Bulgaria. It is the chief pass through the Balkans, which otherwise cross northern Bulgaria in a solid line. The pass connects the capital of Sofia with other major cities in the country, such as Mezdra. There is a road and a railway through the pass, following the course of the Iskar River.

The canyon walls are made of limestone and sandstone, which was carved down by the Iskar over thousands of years, resulting in rugged crags and towers throughout. At one point, the walls are nearly 300 metres (980 ft) tall.
