= Burel Valley =

Valley in Bulgaria

- Valley
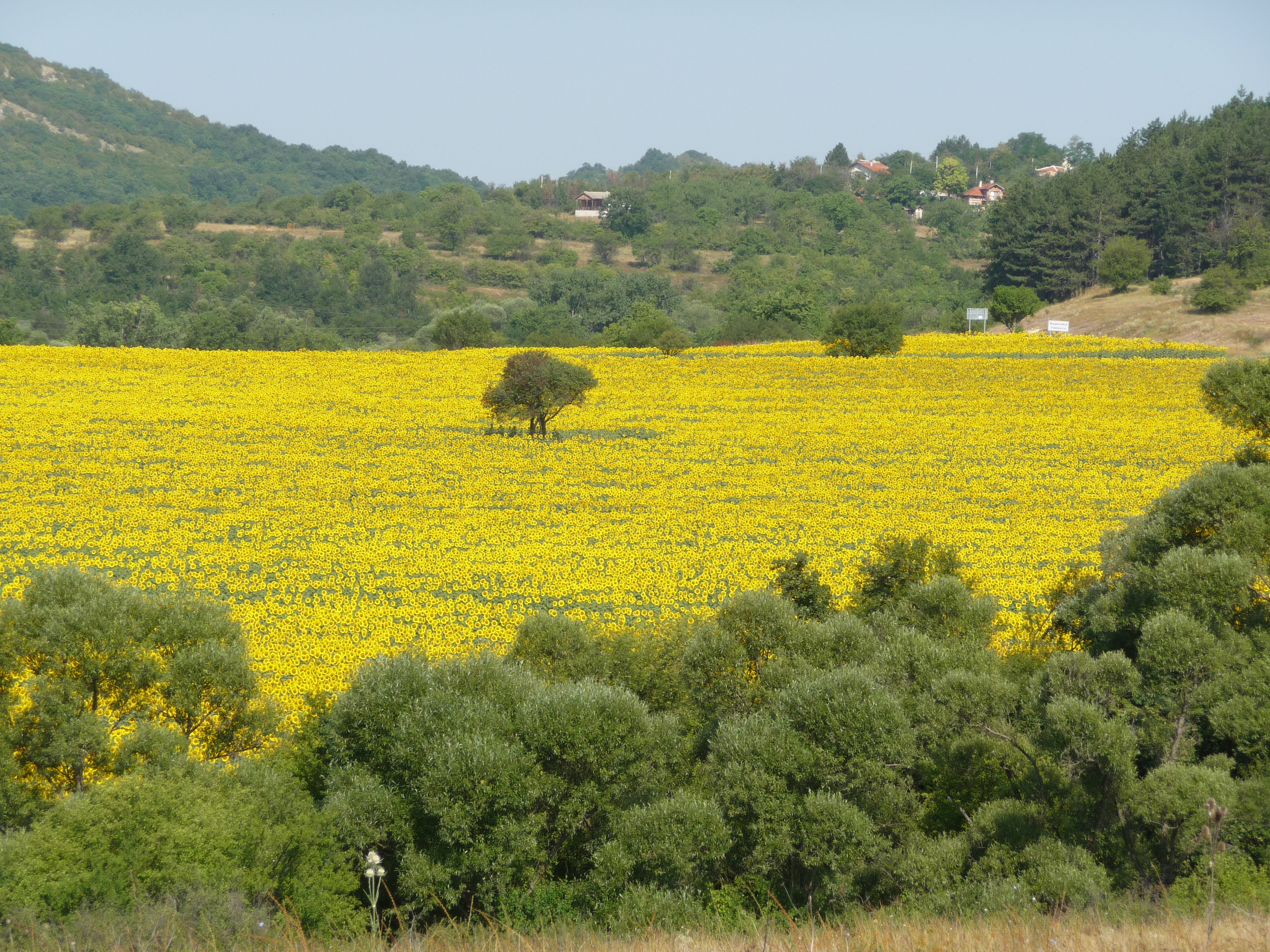
- Burel Valley near Vladislavtsi
- Coordinates: 42°54′12.24″N 22°51′36.36″E
- Location: Bulgaria

Area
  - Total: 172 km^{2} (66 sq mi)

Dimensions
  - Length: 15 km (9.3 mi)
  - Width: 10 km (6.2 mi)

Burel Valley (Bulgarian: Бурелска котловина) is situated in western Bulgaria and is the first and westernmost of the chain of eleven Sub-Balkan valleys. The valley is enclosed between the western slopes of the Chepan division of the Balkan Mountains to the north, the small mountain ranges of Zavalska Planina and Viskyar to the south, and Greben to the west, already on the territory of Serbia. To the east the watershed between the rivers Gaberska and Slivnishka, as well as the Aldomirovtsi Heights form the boundary with the much larger Sofia Valley.

Burel Valley spans a territory of 172 km^{2} in Bulgaria. Its length from northwest to southeast is 15 km; the width varies between 7 and 10 km. The average altitude is 765 m; the highest point is mount Vidim (965 m).

The slopes flanking the valley are composed of Jurassic limestones and Upper Cretaceous andesites, sandstones and tuffites, while the valley basin is composed of lacustrine sediments that contain lignite coal deposits, situated near the village of Gaber. The valley was formed as a result of tectonic compaction during the Pliocene and was subjected to erosional dissection during the Quaternary. Burel Valley has distinctly continental climate, with cold winters and relatively warm summers. It is drained by the river Gaberska, a tributary of the Nišava. The soils are brown forest and chernozem. There are favourable conditions for agriculture and livestock breeding.

The valley is located in Sofia Province, and contains the town of Dragoman, and 22 villages —Bahalin, Vishan, Vladislavtsi, Gaber, Gralska Padina, Dolno Novo Selo, Dragoil, Dragotintsi, Dreatin, Kambelevtsi, Krusha, Nachevo, Nedelishte, Nesla, Pishtane, Povalirazh, Taban, Tsatsarovtsi, Chekanets, Chorul, Chukovezer and Yalbotina. In the northern part near Dragoman runs a small section of the Europe motorway, which duplicates the first class I-8 road Kalotina–Sofia–Plovdiv–Svilengrad. The valley is also traversed from west to east by a 20.2 km stretch of the third class III-813 road Dragoman–Tran.

== Gallery ==
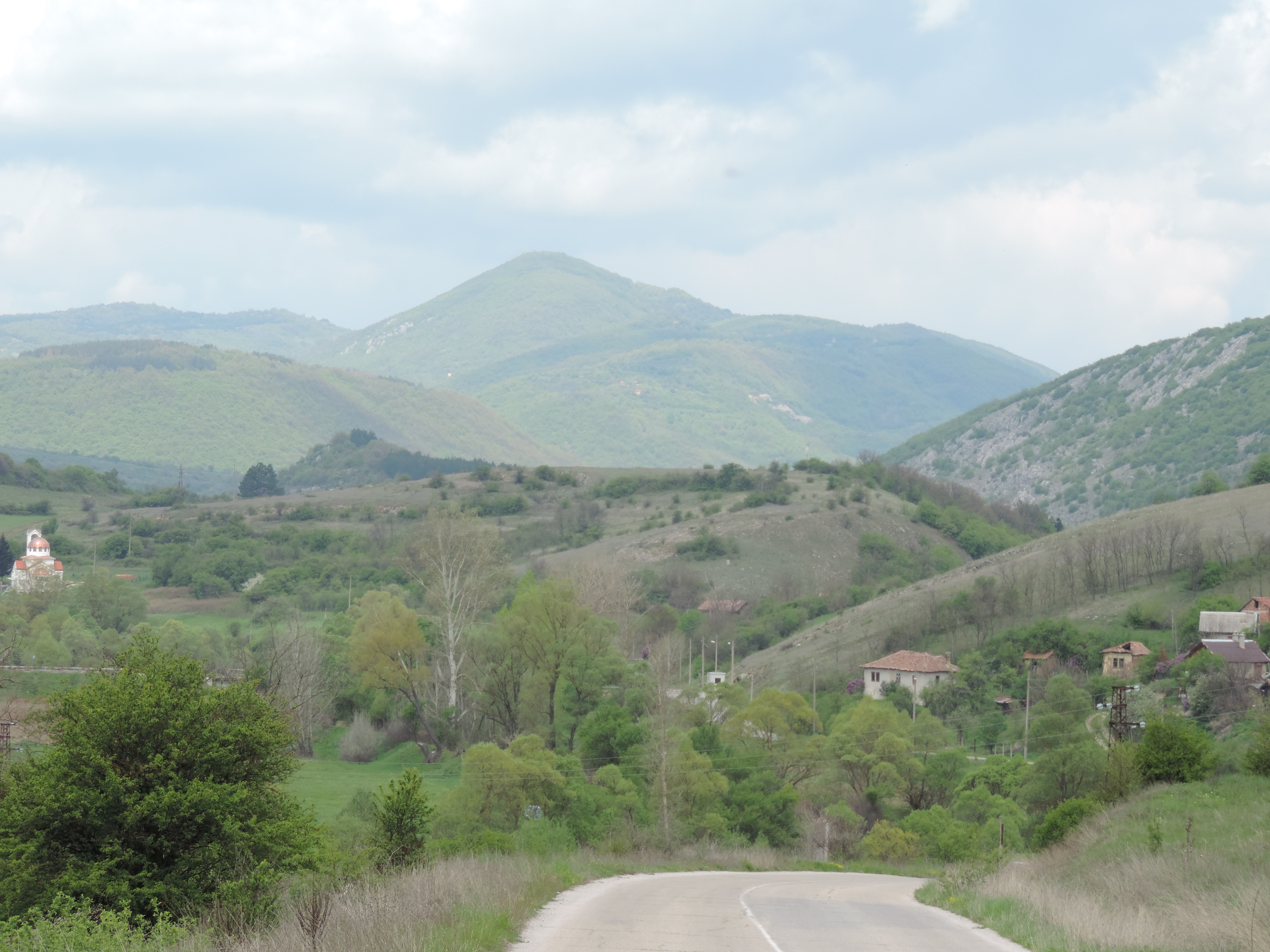
Burel Valley at Nesla

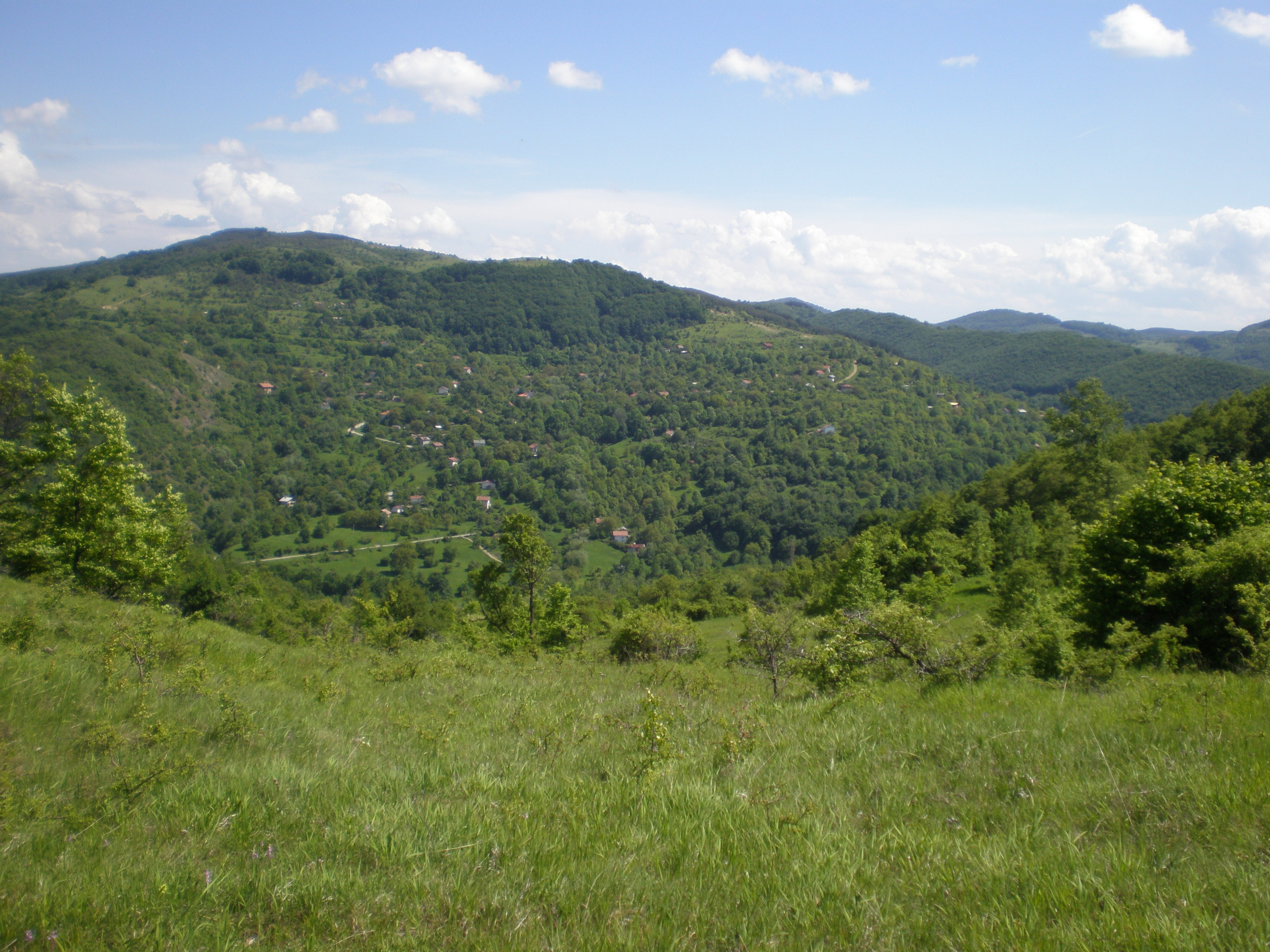
A view to Chekanets

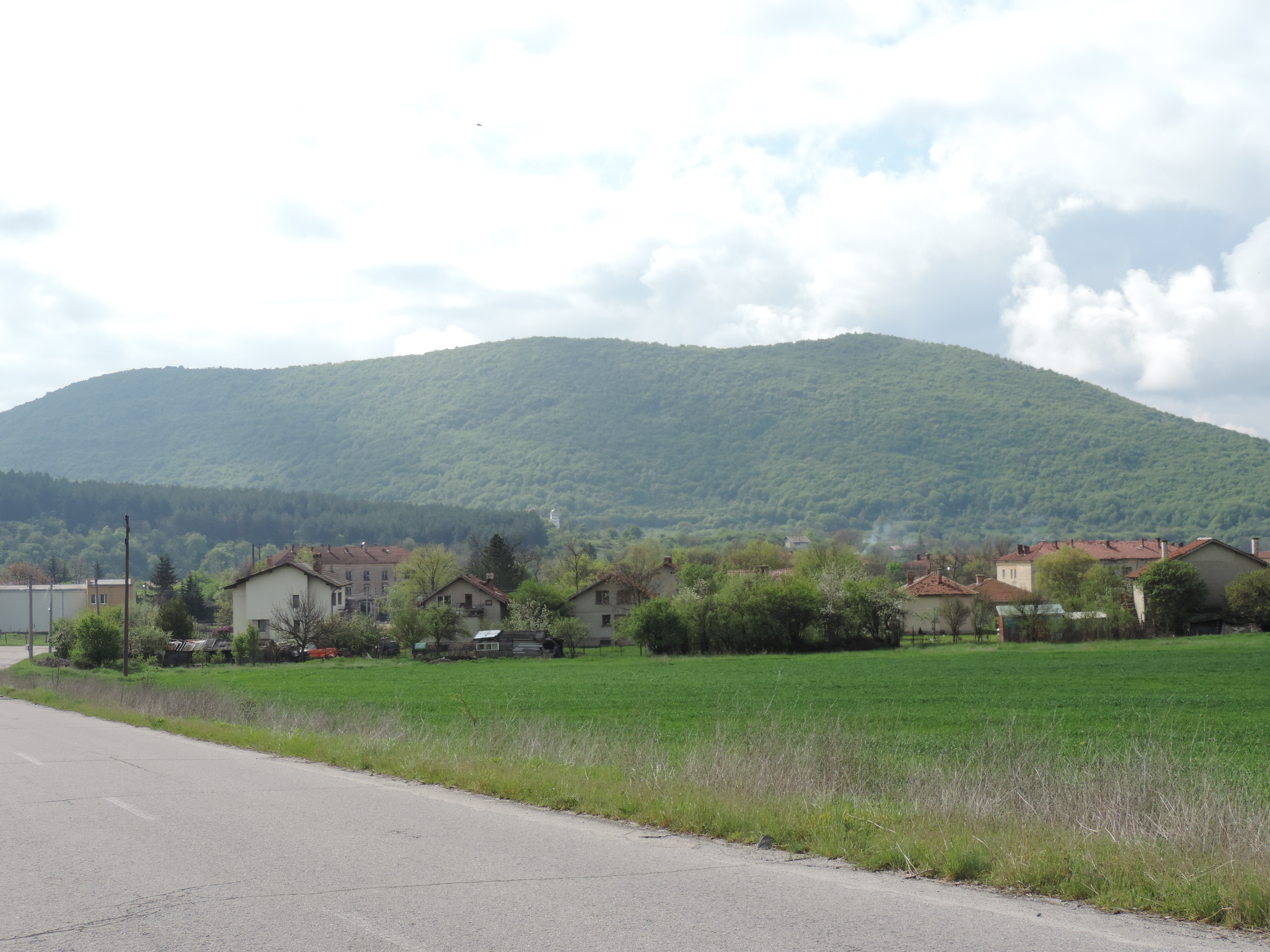
A road to Gaber

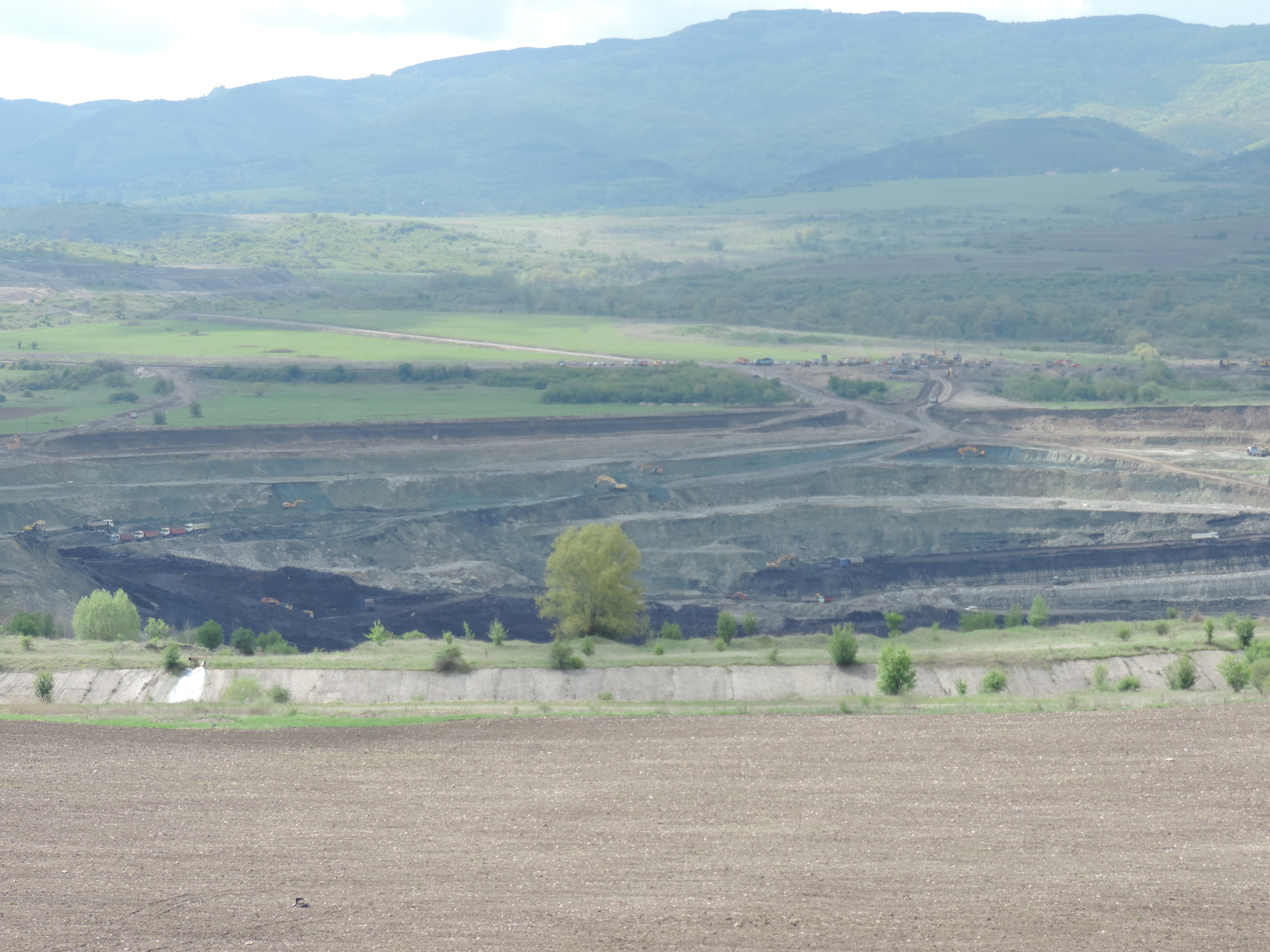
Nedelishte lignite mine

== Sources ==
- Георгиев (Georgiev), Владимир (Vladimir) (1977). Енциклопедия България. Том I. А-В [Encyclopaedia Bulgaria. Volume I. A-V] (in Bulgarian). и колектив. София (Sofia): Издателство на БАН (Bulgarian Academy of Sciences Press).
- Мичев (Michev), Николай (Nikolay); Михайлов (Mihaylov), Цветко (Tsvetko); Вапцаров (Vaptsarov), Иван (Ivan); Кираджиев (Kiradzhiev), Светлин (Svetlin) (1980). Географски речник на България [Geographic Dictionary of Bulgaria] (in Bulgarian). София (Sofia): Наука и култура (Nauka i kultura).
- Николов (Nikolov), В. (V.); Йорданова (Yordanova), М. (M.) (1997). Планините в България [The Mountains of Bulgaria] (in Bulgarian). София (Sofia): Академично издателство „Проф. Марин Дринов“ (Prof. Marin Drinov Academic Press).
