= Dragoman (disambiguation) =

Dragoman was a historical title used by official interpreters in the Ottoman Empire and other Turkish, Arabic, and Persian-speaking polities.

Dragoman may also refer to:

- Dragoman, Bulgaria
- Dragoman Municipality, Bulgaria
- Dragoman Glacier, Antarctica
- Dragoman Marsh, the biggest natural karst wetland in Bulgaria
- Lucian Yahoo Dragoman, a Romanian child fraudulently claimed to have been named after web portal Yahoo!
