= Rayanovtsi, Sofia Province =

Rayanovtsi Раяновци
- Village
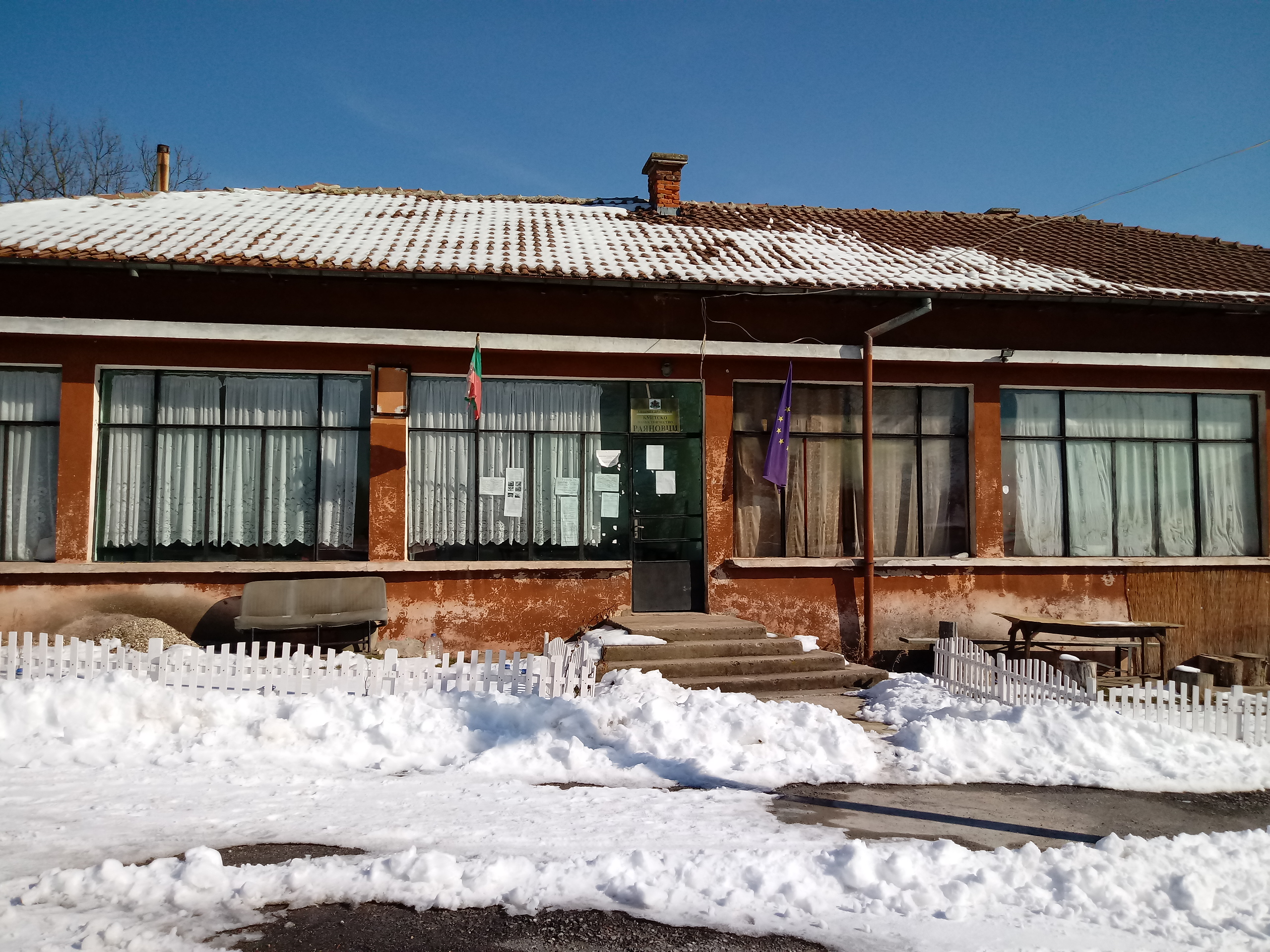
- Mayoralty of Rayanovtsi

- Location within Bulgaria
- Coordinates: 42.9500°N 23.0333°E
- Country: Bulgaria
- Province: Sofia Province
- Municipality: Dragoman
- Time zone: UTC+2 (EET)
  - Summer (DST): UTC+3 (EEST)

Rayanovtsi is a village in Dragoman Municipality, Sofia Province, western Bulgaria.
