= Prekraste =

Prekraste Прекръсте
- Village
- Location within Bulgaria
- Coordinates: 42.9767°N 22.9242°E
- Country: Bulgaria
- Province: Sofia Province
- Municipality: Dragoman
- Time zone: UTC+2 (EET)
  - Summer (DST): UTC+3 (EEST)

Prekraste is a village in Dragoman Municipality, Sofia Province, western Bulgaria.
