= Mount Chepan =

Mountain in Bulgaria

- Чепън (Bulgarian)
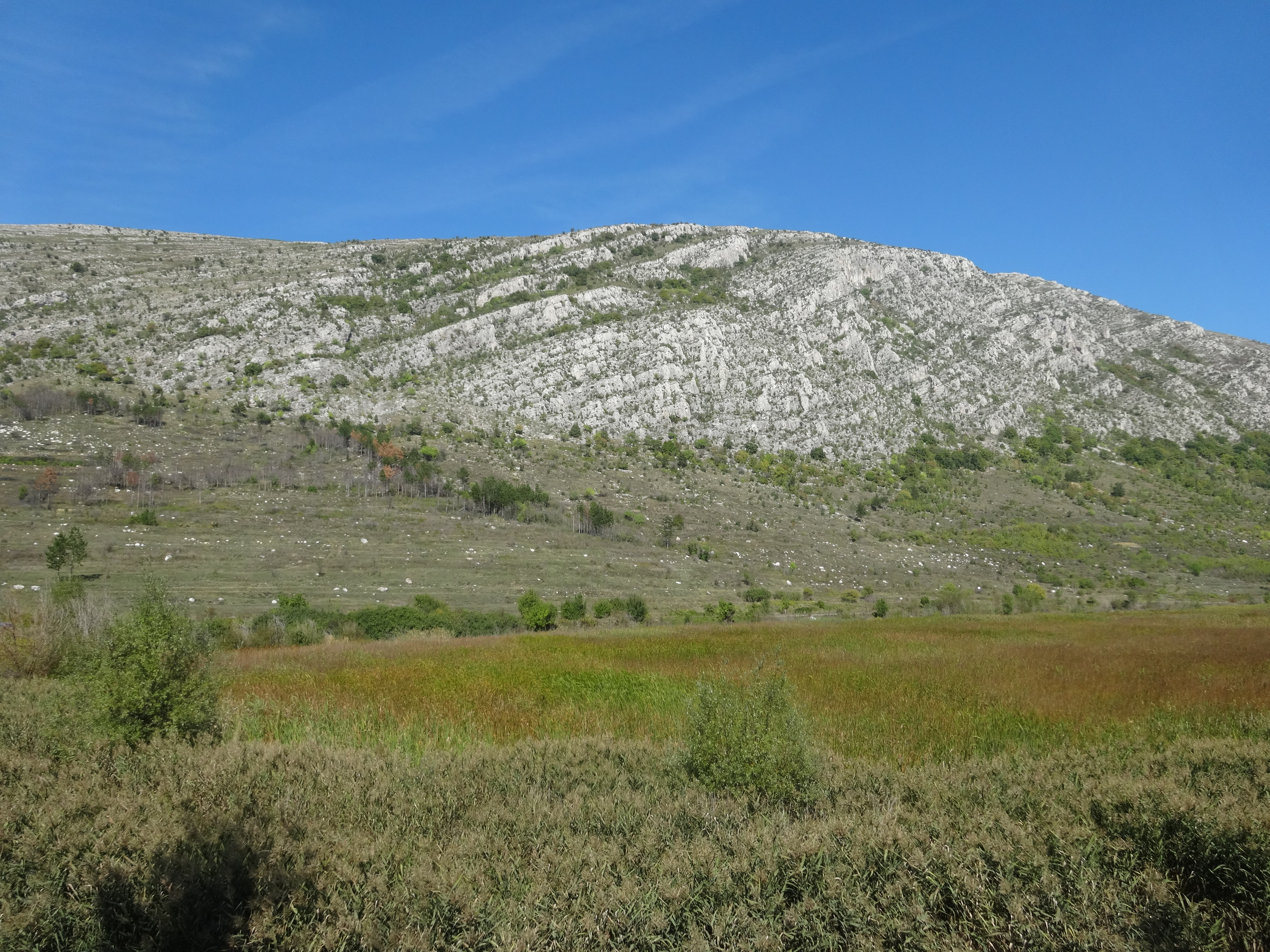
- Mount Chepan, viewed from the Dragoman Marsh

Highest point
- Elevation: 1,205.8 m (3,956 ft)
- Coordinates: 42°57′28.8″N 23°0′24.12″E

Geography
- Location within Bulgaria
- Location: Sofia Province, Bulgaria
- Parent range: Balkan Mountains

Mount Chepan (Bulgarian: Чепън) is a mountain located in western Bulgaria, part of the Balkan Mountains.

== Geography ==
Mount Chepan stretches about 20 km in length and varies in width from 2.5 to 5.5 km, covering an area of around 80 km^{2}. Its highest peak, Petrov crast, stands at 1205.6 meters. The mountain is surrounded by the Nišava River to the north and Mala Mountain to the east, with Dragoman marsh and Ponor Mountain to the south. The Dragoman–Godech road demarcates it from the west.

Close to the town of Dragoman, it is also near the Kalotina–Dimitrovgrad border checkpoint, linking Bulgaria with Serbia via the international road E80 and a railway line.

== Flora ==
In 2014, a study identified 344 species of medicinal plants, which belong to 237 genera and 83 families.

== Archaeology ==
A Thracian sanctuary dedicated to the worship either Sabazios, the Thracian horseman, or possibly both, was located on Mount Chepan. An altar dating back to the early decades of the 3rd century AD was discovered in this sanctuary. Presently, it is on display at the Archaeological Institute and Museum in Sofia.
