= Gralska Padina =

Gralska Padina Грълска падина
- Village
- Location within Bulgaria
- Coordinates: 42.8833°N 22.7833°E
- Country: Bulgaria
- Province: Sofia Province
- Municipality: Dragoman
- Time zone: UTC+2 (EET)
  - Summer (DST): UTC+3 (EEST)

Gralska Padina is a village in Dragoman Municipality, Sofia Province, western Bulgaria.

== History ==
The oldest family in the village was the Vaklini family, from which the Krastini, Stankovi, and Mladenovi families later branched off. Other early settlers included merchant and innkeeper Galab Ivanov from Nedelishte, felt-maker Mateya Milushev, and Nako Ivanov from Prodantcha.

Gralska Padina was officially recognized as a village in 1892.
