= Lipintsi =

Lipintsi Липинци
- Village
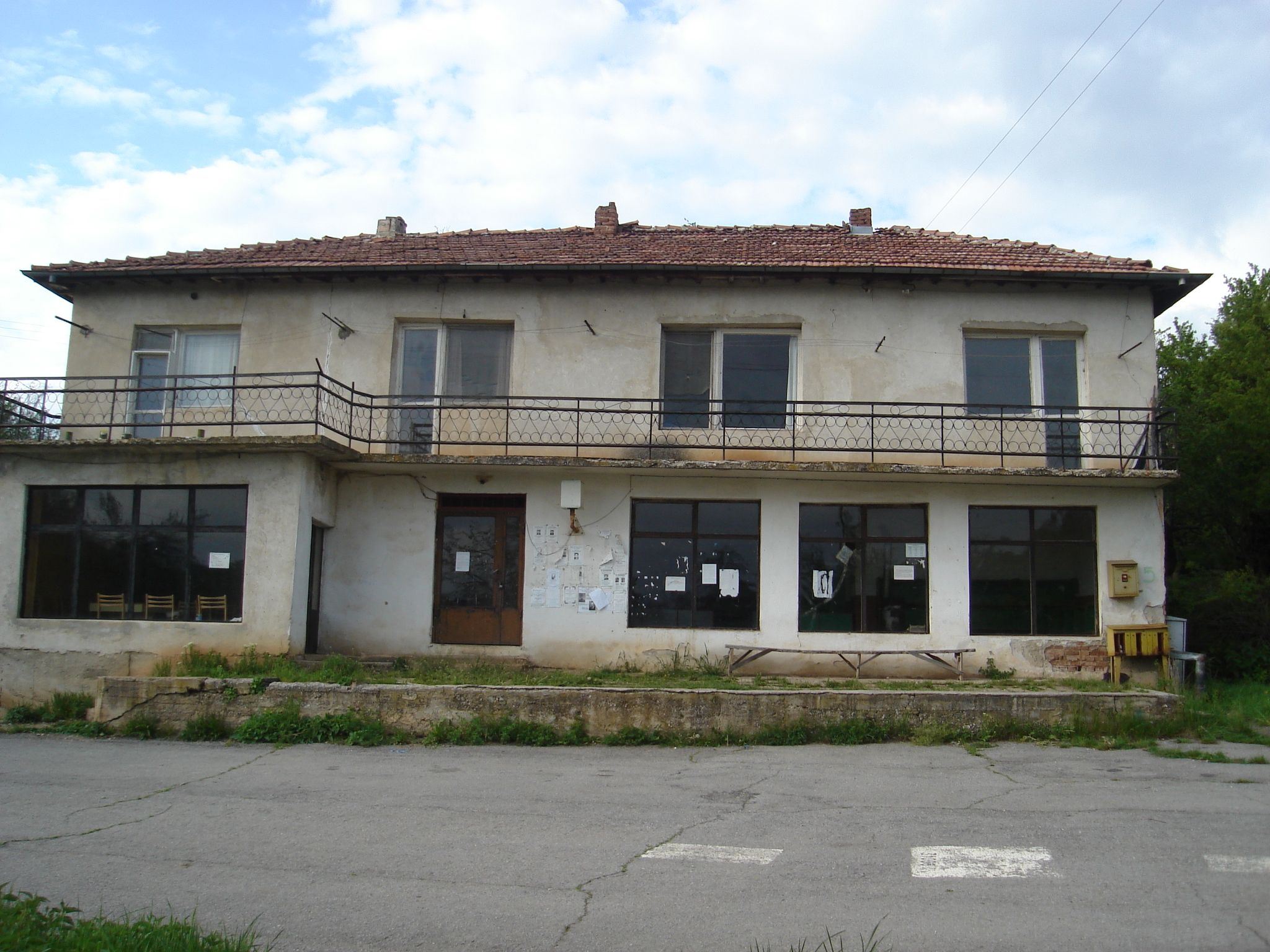
- A picture of a Public building in the village of Lipintsi, Dragoman municipality - a former shop, club and home for the families of border officers.

- Location within Bulgaria
- Coordinates: 43.0125°N 22.8667°E
- Country: Bulgaria
- Province: Sofia Province
- Municipality: Dragoman
- Time zone: UTC+2 (EET)
  - Summer (DST): UTC+3 (EEST)

Lipintsi is a village in Dragoman Municipality, Sofia Province, western Bulgaria.
