= Novo Bardo =

Novo Bardo Ново Бърдо
- Village
- Location within Bulgaria
- Coordinates: 42.9500°N 22.8500°E
- Country: Bulgaria
- Province: Sofia Province
- Municipality: Dragoman
- Time zone: UTC+2 (EET)
  - Summer (DST): UTC+3 (EEST)

Novo Bardo is a village in Dragoman Municipality, Sofia Province, western Bulgaria.
