= Cheparlyantsi =

Cheparlyantsi Чепърлянци
- Village
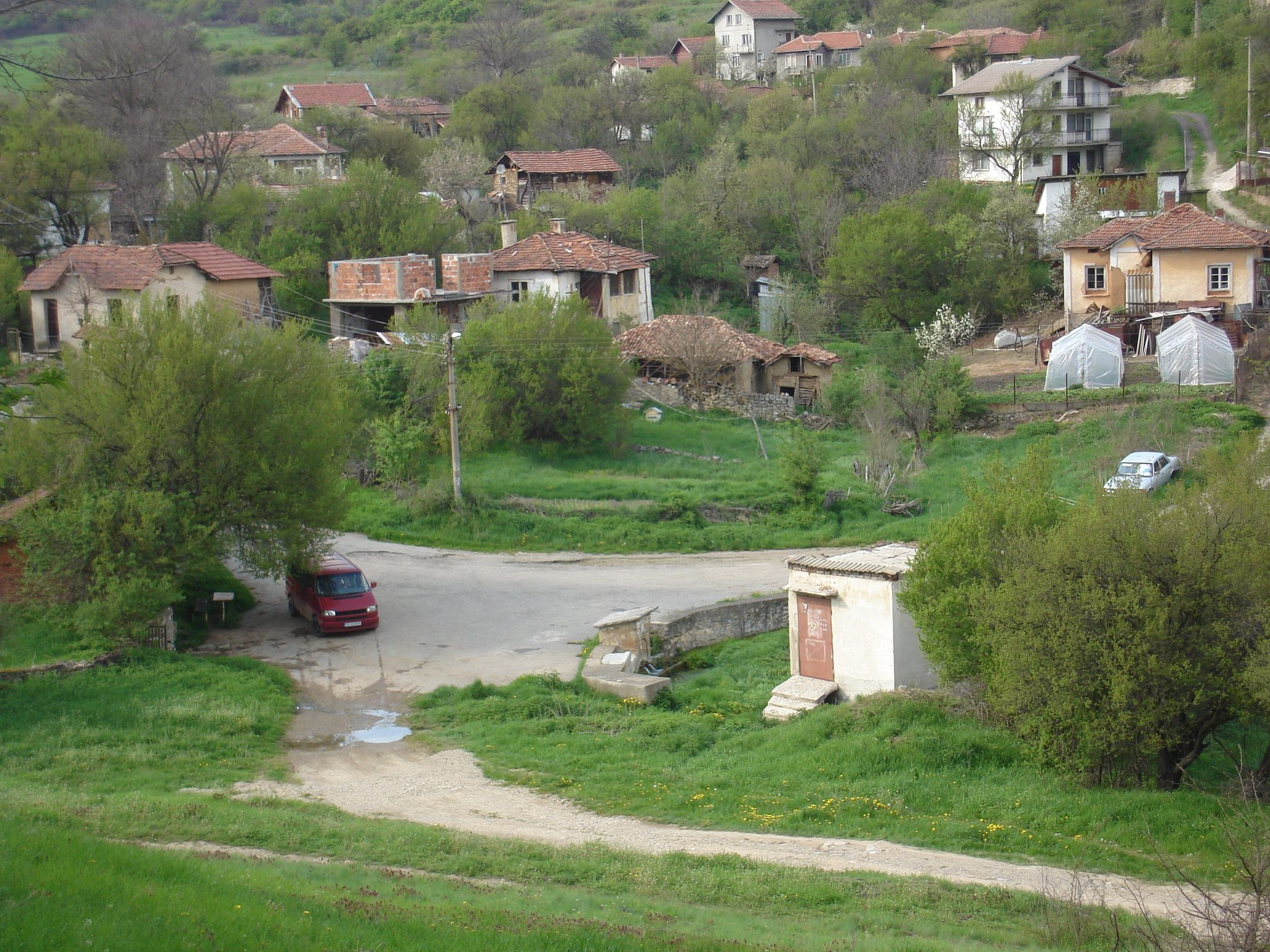
- The center of the village of Cheparlyantsi. In the foreground - the village fountains.

- Location within Bulgaria
- Coordinates: 43.0189°N 22.9064°E
- Country: Bulgaria
- Province: Sofia Province
- Municipality: Dragoman
- Time zone: UTC+2 (EET)
  - Summer (DST): UTC+3 (EEST)

Cheparlyantsi is a village in Dragoman Municipality, Sofia Province, western Bulgaria.
