= Taban, Bulgaria =

Taban Табан
- Village
- Location within Bulgaria
- Coordinates: 42°52′55″N 22°53′25″E
- Country: Bulgaria
- Province: Sofia Province
- Municipality: Dragoman
- Time zone: UTC+2 (EET)
  - Summer (DST): UTC+3 (EEST)

Taban is a village in Dragoman Municipality, Sofia Province, western Bulgaria. With a total population of 23, Taban spreads across 5.57 km2. It is located 40.651km away from the capital city of Sofia.
