= Dolno Novo Selo, Sofia Province =

Dolno Novo Selo Долно Ново село
- Village
- Location within Bulgaria
- Coordinates: 42.9647°N 22.7967°E
- Country: Bulgaria
- Province: Sofia Province
- Municipality: Dragoman
- Time zone: UTC+2 (EET)
  - Summer (DST): UTC+3 (EEST)

Dolno Novo Selo is a village in Dragoman Municipality, Sofia Province, western Bulgaria. The etymology of the village comes from Slavic languages meaning new village, Novo Selo.
