= Dragoil =

Village in Bulgaria

Dragoil Село Драгоил
- Village
- Location within Bulgaria
- Coordinates: 42.9381°N 22.8717°E
- Country: Bulgaria
- Province: Sofia Province
- Municipality: Dragoman

Population (9 September 2021)
  - Total: 56
- Time zone: UTC+2 (EET)
  - Summer (DST): UTC+3 (EEST)
- Postal code: 2208
- Area code: 07172

Dragoil is a village in Dragoman Municipality, Sofia Province, western Bulgaria.
