= Chorul =

Chorul Чорул
- Village
- Location in Bulgaria
- Coordinates: 42°55′05″N 22°51′53″E
- Country: Bulgaria
- Province: Sofia Province
- Municipality: Dragoman
- Time zone: UTC+2 (EET)
  - Summer (DST): UTC+3 (EEST)

Chorul is a village in Dragoman Municipality, Sofia Province, western Bulgaria.
