= Chekanets, Sofia Province =

Chekanets Чеканец
- Village
- Location within Bulgaria
- Coordinates: 42.8667°N 22.7753°E
- Country: Bulgaria
- Province: Sofia Province
- Municipality: Dragoman
- Time zone: UTC+2 (EET)
  - Summer (DST): UTC+3 (EEST)

Chekanets is a village in Dragoman Municipality, Sofia Province, western Bulgaria.
