= Chavdar, Sofia Province =

Chavdar Чавдар
- Location of Chavdar
- Coordinates: 42°39′36″N 24°03′20.8″E
- Country: Bulgaria
- Province: Sofia
- Municipality: Chavdar Municipality

Government
  - Mayor: Григор Даулов
- Elevation: 570 m (1,870 ft)

Population (2020)
  - Total: 1,281
- Time zone: UTC+2 (EET)
  - Summer (DST): UTC+3 (EEST)
- Postal Code: 2084
- Area code: 07189

Chavdar (Bulgarian: Чавдар, pronounced [t͡ʃɐvˈdar]) is a village situated in a mountain region, in the eastern part of Sofia Province, Bulgaria.

It is the administrative center of Chavdar Municipality. The municipality is located in the sub-Balkan Zlatitsa-Pirdop Basin. It consists of only one village, namely the village of Chavdar. The municipality is one of the smallest in Bulgaria, situated in the Zlatitsa–Pirdop Valley at the southern outskirts of the Balkan Mountains, and on the northern foothills of Sredna Gora mountain. It is located about 72 km (45 miles) east of Sofia, the capital city of Bulgaria. Close by are the cities of Zlatitsa and Pirdop.

== History ==
=== Prehistoric time ===
Ever since prehistoric times the land of present time Chavdar has been populated by people. Archaeological excavations of a settlement mound near the Topolnitsa River show that a Neolithic community has been present as early as 7,000 years ago.

The study of Neolithic culture "Chavdar" began in May 1968. Professor Georgi Georgiev and Senior Researcher Kancho Kanchev, both with the National Archaeological Museum of Bulgaria were leading the efforts through the years to uncover the hidden artifacts. Team of British archeologists were also involved in the archeological dig. Stratigraphic coring results confirmed the presence of seven cultural layers. By 1980 the site was fully explored.

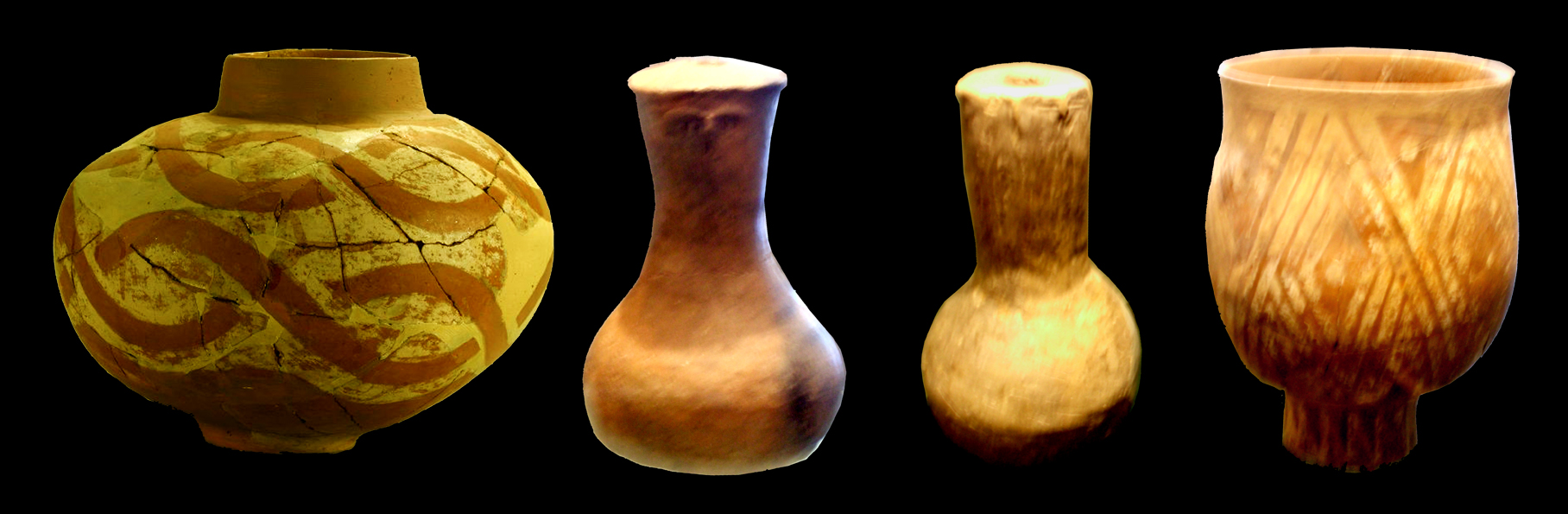
Neolithic Chavdar Culture, polychromatic and anthropomorphic pottery, 6200-5400 B.C., Bulgaria

Early Neolithic village of Chavdar is isochronous to Karanovo I and II Neolithic sites which are dated about 6200 BC. The artifact findings are also similar to Kremikovtsi Neolithic village findings. "Early Neolithic culture Kremikovtsi—Chavdar" is the earliest Neolithic culture in the Sofia Plain and the sub-Balkan Basin. This culture artifacts have played important role in periodization of the prehistoric time in Bulgaria and the region.

The Neolithic settlement mound consisted of pile dwellings along the Topolnitsa River. Extremely valuable Neolithic painted pottery and stone tools have been found. A sword dated back to 4th century B.C. is also among the artifacts. Other findings include pottery and coins dated to different time in history. All artifacts were made available to specialists for further studies. Now all the findings are in the exhibitions of the Bulgarian National Archaeological Museum (Capital Sofia), and the local historical museum (City of Pirdop).

=== Medieval Time ===
According to Dobreyshovo Gospels (first quarter of the 13th century), a village named Markovo has been situated east of the present day village site in a location called "Kyoidere".

The first written evidence of the present day village of Chavdar are found in the Ottoman Nikopol District Tax Register dating back to 1430. The village of Chavdar can be found under the name Kolanlar[e] listing 29 taxpayers.

=== Present Time ===
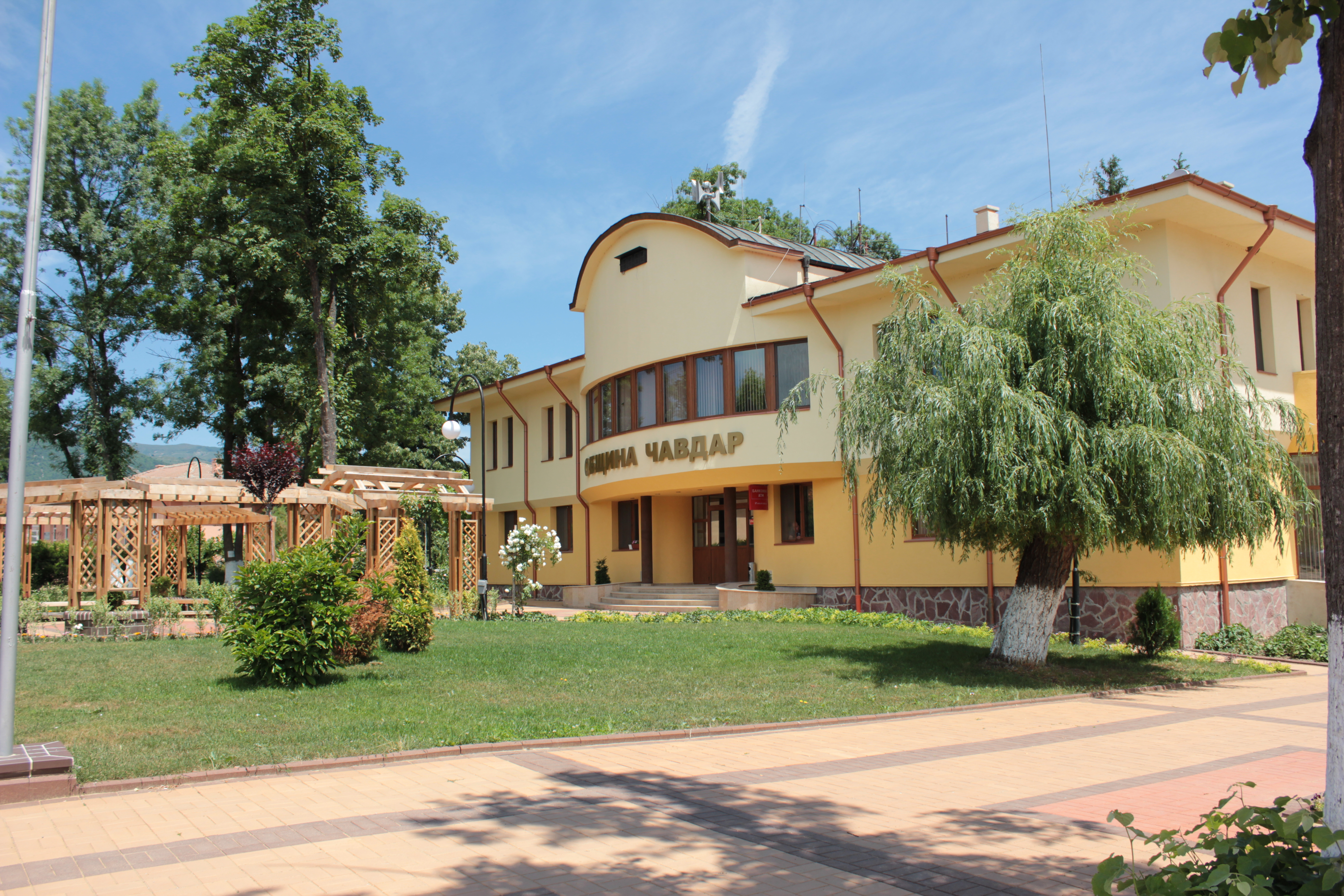
Chavdar Village Hall

The village of Chavdar was known as Kolanlare until 1899 when the village inhabitants named their village Radoslavovo after the name of the Bulgarian Liberal Party (Radoslavists) leader at the time Dr. Vasil Radoslavov, a long-time politician, member of parliament, minister in various capacities, and prime minister of Bulgaria.

Legend has it, while visiting the village, sitting at the banks of Topolnitsa River, Dr. Radoslavov has said: "If there is a paradise upon Earth, it is here in Bulgaria. "If there is a paradise in Bulgaria, it is here [in Chavdar]".

Chavdar acquired its present name on 5 February 1946. It was named after Chavdar Resistance Brigade, a Bulgarian partisan group of World War II that was active in the region.

In 1991, the village became the administrative center of Chavdar Municipality (Presidential Decree № 250, 15 August 1991).

== Demographics ==
=== Religion ===
According to the latest Bulgarian census of 2011, the religious composition, among those who answered the optional question on religious identification, was the following:

Religious composition of Chavdar Municipality
Orthodox Christianity	86.8%
Catholicism	0.4%
Protestantism	0.0%
Islam	0.0%
No religion	8.5%
Prefer not to answer, others and indefinable	4.3%
