= Elatsite mine =

Copper mine in Sofia, Bulgaria

- Location: Sofia Province, Bulgaria
- Products: Copper

The Elatsite mine is a large copper mine located in the west of Bulgaria in Sofia Province. Elatsite represents one of the largest copper reserve in Bulgaria and in the world having estimated reserves of 650 million tonnes of ore grading 0.3% copper. The mine is currently owned by the Geotechmin group.
