= Chelopech mine =

Gold mine in Sofia, Bulgaria

- Location within Bulgaria
- Location: Chelopech, Sofia Province, Bulgaria
- Products: Gold
- Company: Dundee Precious Metals, Dundee Corporation
- Website: https://www.dundeeprecious.com/

The Chelopech mine is one of the most modern copper-gold mines in Bulgaria. The mine is located at the western part of the country in Sofia Province. The mine has estimated reserves of 41 tons of gold and 4,182 tons of silver.
