= Chavdar Municipality =

Coordinates: 42°39′N 24°03′E

Chavdar Municipality Община Чавдар
- Municipality
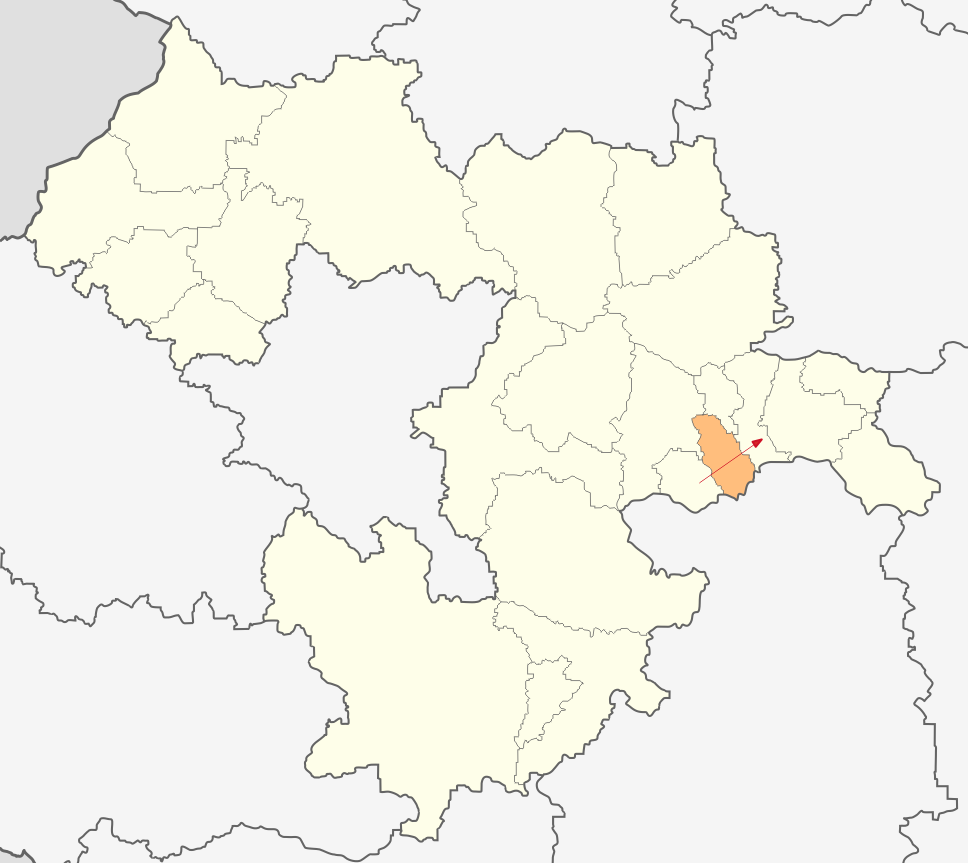
- Country: Bulgaria
- Province: Sofia Province
- Seat: Chavdar

Chavdar Municipality is one of the municipalities in Sofia Province, Bulgaria. The seat is at Chavdar, Sofia Province.

== Demographics ==
=== Religion ===
According to the latest Bulgarian census of 2011, the religious composition, among those who answered the optional question on religious identification, was the following:

Religious composition of Chavdar Municipality
Orthodox Christianity	86.8%
Catholicism	0.4%
Protestantism	0.0%
Islam	0.0%
No religion	8.5%
Prefer not to answer, others and indefinable	4.3%
