= Gaber, Sofia Province =

Gaber Габер
- Village
- Location within Bulgaria
- Coordinates: 42.9000°N 22.8606°E
- Country: Bulgaria
- Province: Sofia Province
- Municipality: Dragoman
- Time zone: UTC+2 (EET)
  - Summer (DST): UTC+3 (EEST)

Gaber (Bulgarian: Габер [ˈɡabɛr]) is a village in Dragoman Municipality, Sofia Province, western Bulgaria.
