= Lucian Yahoo Dragoman =

In January 2005, Romanian newspaper Libertatea reported the birth of Lucian Yahoo Dragoman, supposedly named after the web portal Yahoo. The story spread briefly on the Internet, but was quickly found to have been fabricated by a reporter, who was subsequently fired.

According to the article, Lucian Yahoo was born around December 2004 in Mediaș, Romania. His parents, Nonu and Cornelia Dragoman, supposedly met online, and had a virtual relationship for three months before meeting in person. The story quoted the mother as saying: "We named him Lucian Yahoo after my father and the net, the main beacon of my life." While people have legally changed their names to that of a business, this story was presumed to be the first person named at birth after a highly identifiable product or service.
