= Dragoman Marsh =

Karst wetland

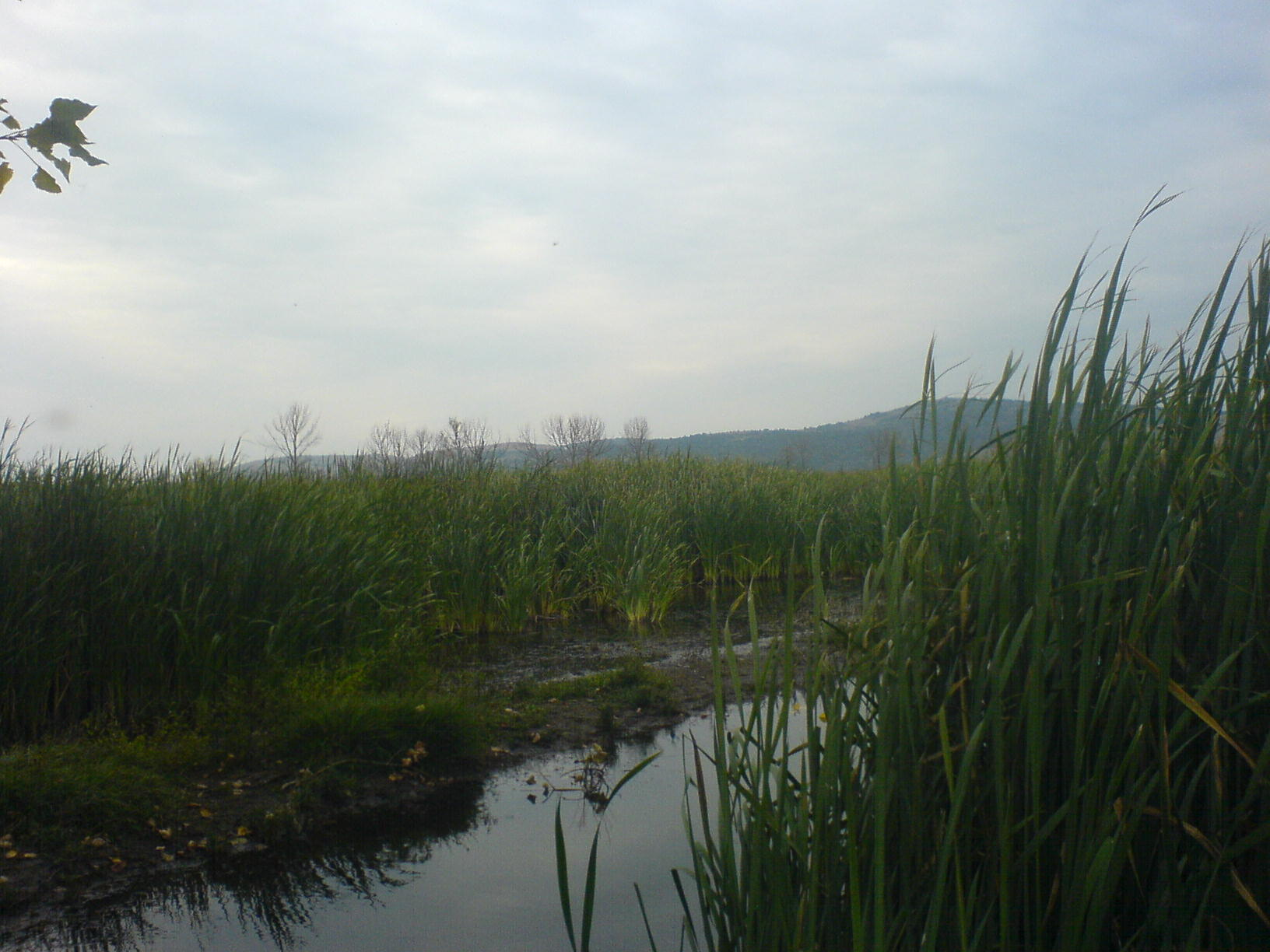
- Interactive map of Dragoman Marsh
- Location: Bulgaria
- Coordinates: 42°55′54″N 22°57′42″E
- Area: 14,967 ha (57.79 sq mi)

Ramsar Wetland
- Official name: Dragoman Marsh Karst Complex
- Designated: 2 November 2011
- Reference no.: 1970

The Dragoman Marsh is the biggest natural karst wetland in Bulgaria. It is situated only 35 km north-west of Sofia and covers a valley between the limestone hills Tri Ushi and Chepan.

== Ecology ==
The marsh is a protected sanctuary for birds. Over 200 species have been recorded in the area. Some of them have a high conservation status. The marsh is also home to more than 140 plant species.

Among the over 200 species of birds, the following species can be seen in the marsh:

- Eurasian bittern
- Western osprey
- Purple heron
- Short-toed eagle
- Peregrine falcon
- Long-legged buzzard
- Black stork
- Ferruginous duck
- Black-winged stilt
- Common raven
- White stork

The area is often visited by nature lovers and environmentalists, who can use the watchtower and eco-route provided at no cost.

== History ==
For years, the Dragoman Marsh has played an important role in flood control and agriculture in the surrounding areas.

In the 1950s, the Dragoman Marsh was drained to make room for agricultural development. However, drainage activities were halted in the early 1990s and the marsh began to revert to its original state. Currently, threats to the marsh include pollution by untreated wastewater.

The Dragonman Marsh was proclaimed a Ramsar site on February 2, 2012. At 14967 HA, it is the second biggest such site in Bulgaria after Belene Islands.

== See also ==
- Aldomirovtsi Marsh
