= Urdini Lakes =

Group of glacial lakes in the Rila Mountains

Coordinates: 42°10′28″N 23°19′44″E

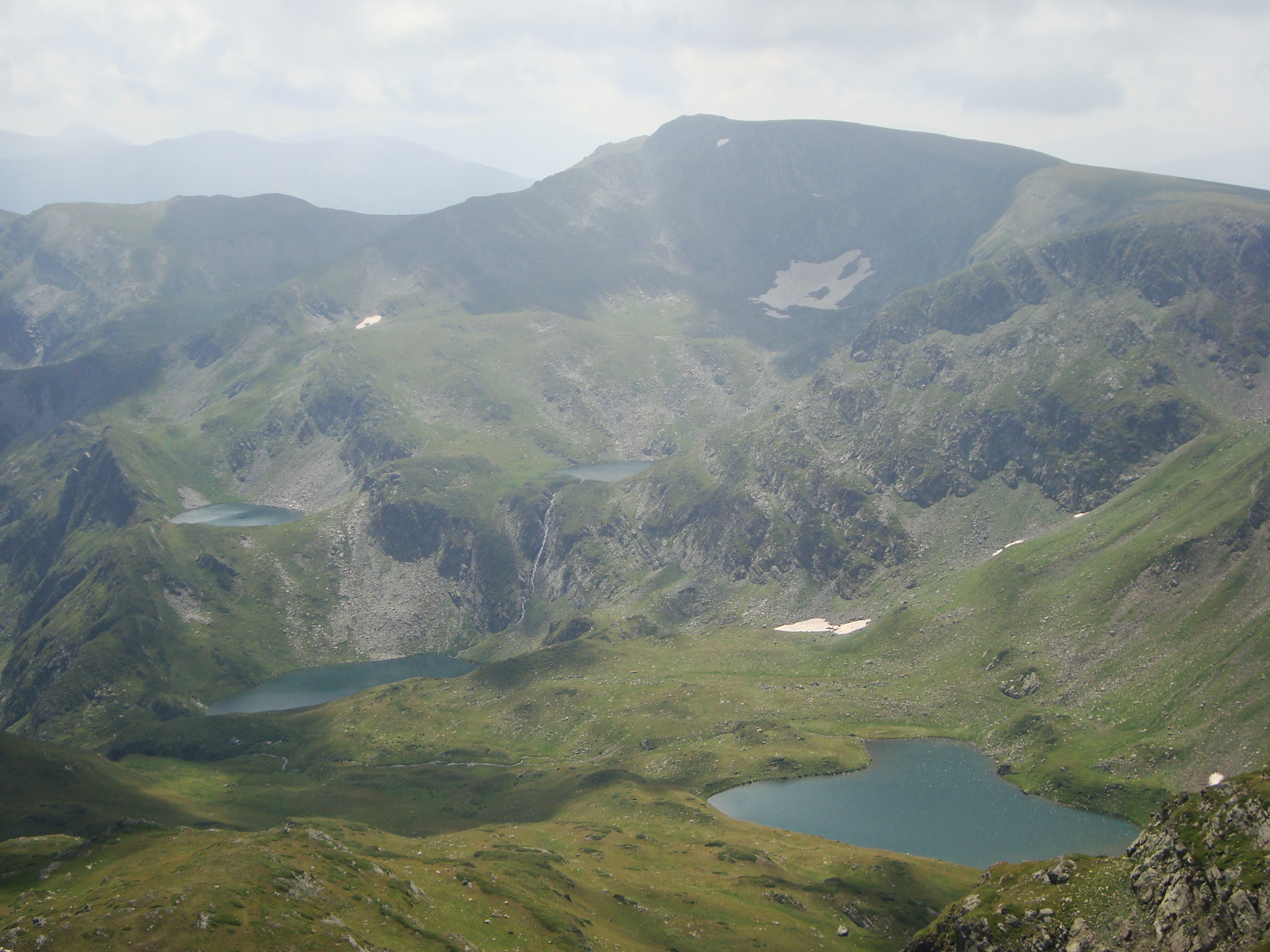
The Urdini Lakes seen from the Damga peak

The Urdini Lakes (Bulgarian: Урдини езера [ˈurdini ɛzɛˈra]) are a group of glacial lakes, situated in the northwestern Rila Mountains in Bulgaria.

They are not as popular with the tourists as the Seven Rila Lakes further west, because they are situated in the most difficultly accessible areas of the mountain range. The Urdini lakes are located in the western section of the homonymous cirque between the summits of Damga (2,669 m) to the northwest and Dodov peak (2,661 m) to the south. They consist of six lakes: Suhoto (Bulgarian for Dry), Ribnoto (Fish), Triagalnoto (Triangle), Botanicheskoto (Botanical), Golyamata Panitsa and Malkata Panitsa. The lakes are drained by the river Urdina, a right tributary of the Cherni Iskar, which is considered the main stem of Bulgaria's longest river that runs entirely within the country, the Iskar.

The individual lakes have a relatively small size, between 0.8 and 2.5 hectares. At smallest one is Ribnoto Lake (at an altitude of 2,348 m), which due to its proximity to the summit of Damga, at about 500 m to the southeast of the peak, is also called Damgsko Lake. Although this lake is the smallest in size, it has the largest catchment area in the group. The largest lake in both size and volume is Golyamata Panitsa Lake with an area of 2.5 hectares and volume of 89,500 m³. With an altitude of 2,278 m, it is the lowest in the lake group. The second largest is Triagalnoto Lake Triangle with an area of 2.34 hectares. The highest lake is Suhoto Lake, located not far from Dodov peak at an altitude of 2375 m. It has a circular shape and reaches 5 m in depth. The deepest lake at 7.6 m is Malkata Panitsa (2,336 m), situated to the east of the Ribnoto. Its outflow forms a small waterfall before it pours into Golyamata Panitsa Lake and then into the Urdina River.

In 1985, the Urdini Lakes were declared a natural landmark of national and international importance. They fall within the boundaries of the Rila National Park. The lakes are rich in river and rainbow trout; the latter is an introduced species. Fishing is forbidden.
