= Damga =

Mountain in Bulgaria

Damga (Дамга)
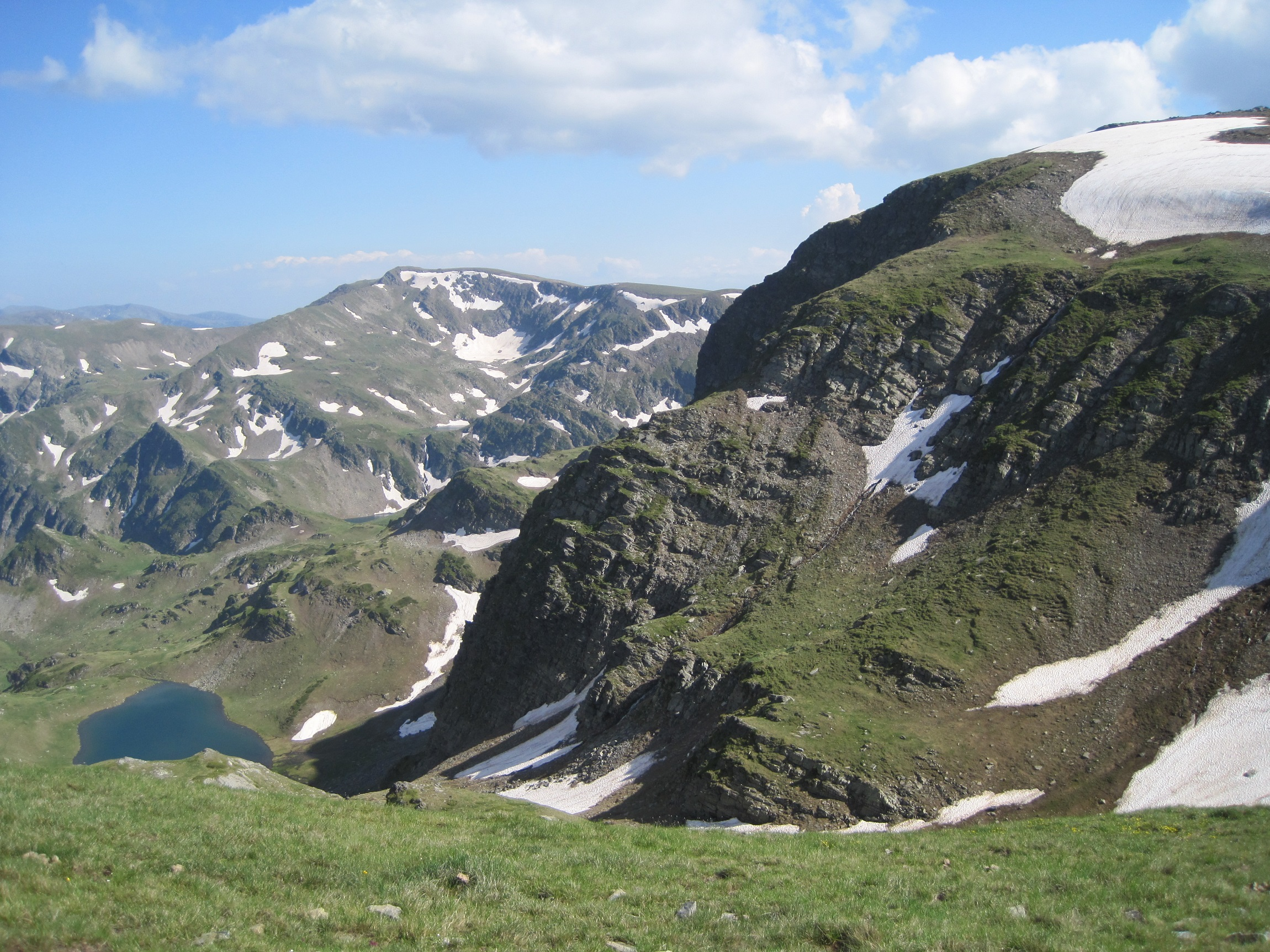
- Damga and Urdini Lakes

Highest point
- Elevation: 2,669 m (8,757 ft)
- Coordinates: 42°11′12.12″N 23°19′3.72″E

Geography
- Location: Bulgaria
- Parent range: Rila Mountains

Damga (Bulgarian: Дамга) is a summit in the northwestern part of the Rila Mountain in southwestern Bulgaria reaching height of 2,669 m. Damga is the main orographic node of northwestern Rila, connecting the ridges of Malyovitsa and Otovitsa. The peak is an impressive massif with mostly dome-shaped outlines. It dominates the western parts of the Urdina cirque containing the Urdini Lakes, where its slopes are steep and rocky. To the west, the slopes of the summit gently descend to the grassy folds of the Malko and Golyamo Pazardere meadows. It is built up of metamorphic rock.

The main watershed of the Balkan Peninsula passes through Damga, continuing north through the summit of Haramiyata (2,465 m) and along the ridge separating the rivers Dzherman belonging to the Aegean basin and Cherni Iskar belonging to the Black Sea basin.

There are several tourist trails accessing Damga. Through its southwestern slopes passes the summer trail the Seven Lakes refuge to the Rila Monastery. The winter trail from the Maliovitsa refuge to Ivan Vazov refuge intersects the highest point and to the north there is a trail to the Seven Rila Lakes.
