= Kalotina =

Kalotina Калотина
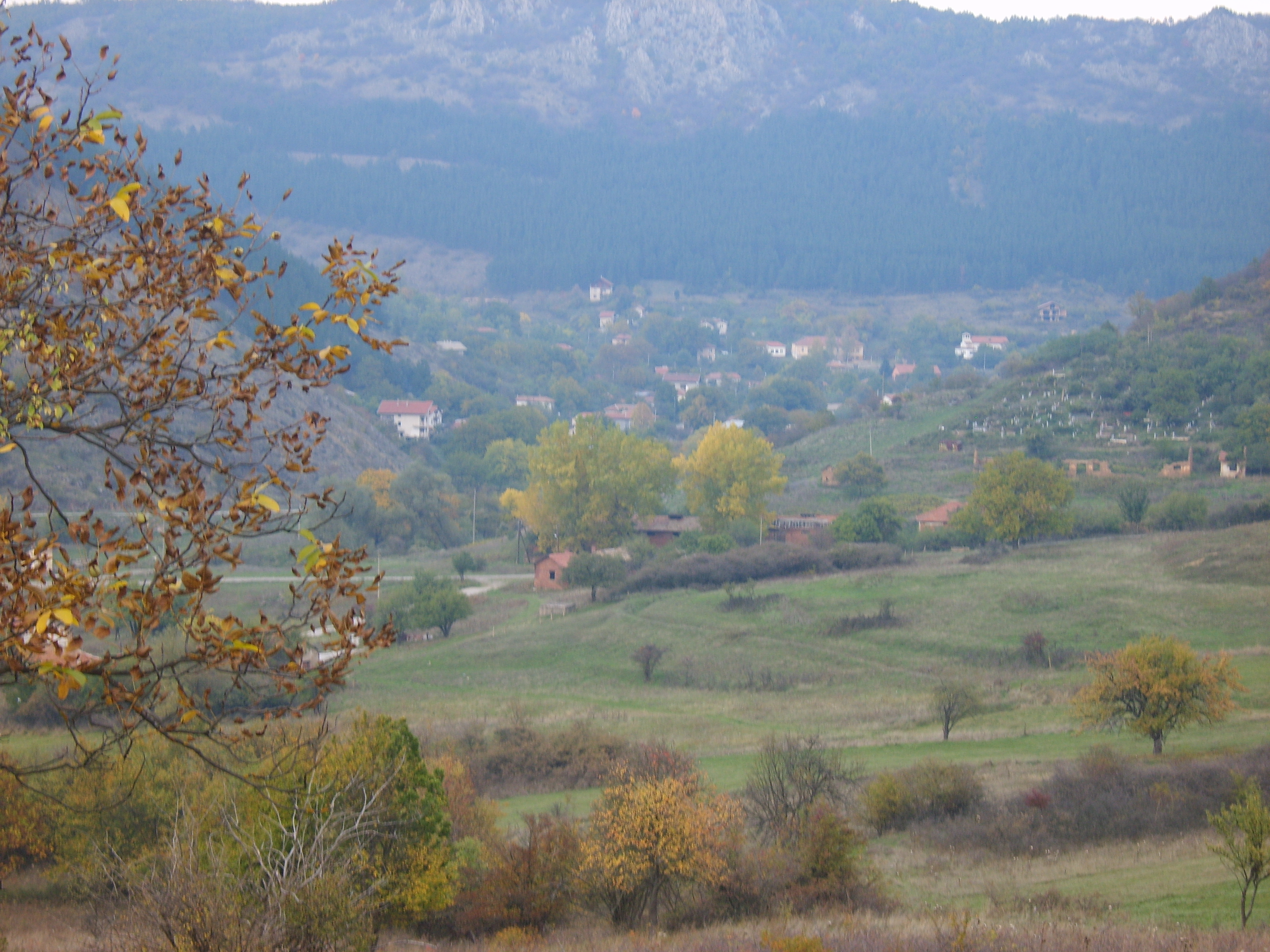
- View towards Kalotina

- Kalotina
- Coordinates: 42°59′44″N 22°52′7″E
- Country: Bulgaria
- Province (Oblast): Sofia

Government
  - Mayor: Ludmila Lubomirova
- Elevation: 621 m (2,037 ft)

Population (2026)
  - Total: 180
- Time zone: UTC+2 (EET)
  - Summer (DST): UTC+3 (EEST)
- Postal Code: 2212
- Area code: 07174

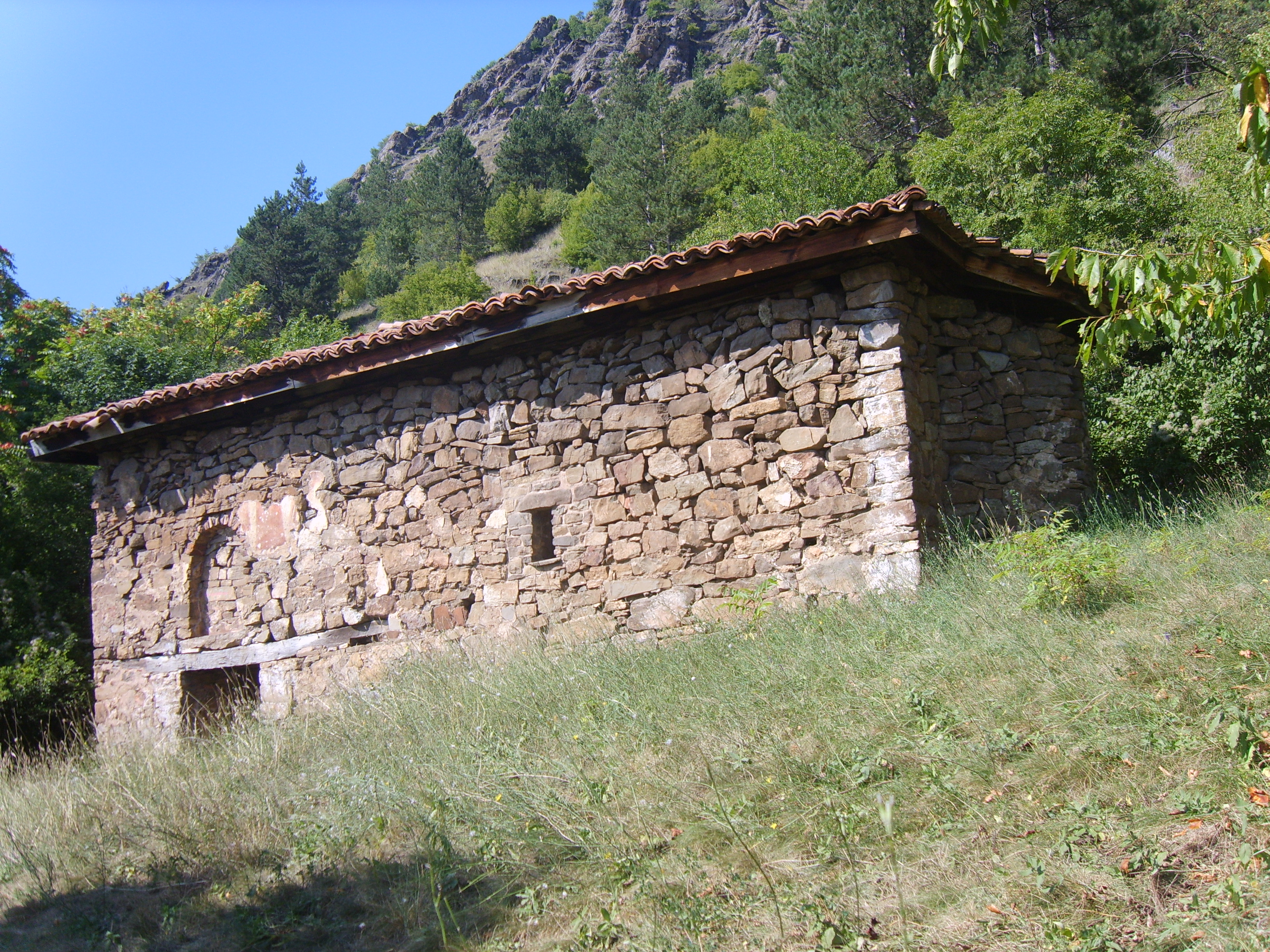
The medieval Church of St Nicholas in Kalotina

Kalotina (Bulgarian: Калотина [kɐˈɫɔtinɐ]) is a village in the Dragoman Municipality, Sofia Province, in westernmost central Bulgaria. As of 2026, it has 170-190 inhabitants, down from 270 in 2010. The mayor is Людмила Любомирова. The village is located at 1.5km from the border with Serbia, 53 km to the northwest of the capital Sofia, near the main highway and railway between Western Europe and Asia. Kalotina lies at 42°59′N 22°52′E, 282 metres above sea level. The place is known for the Kalotina-Gradinje border checkpoint, one of Bulgaria's busiest and best known due to the proximity to Sofia. The Nishava River, a tributary of the South Morava, flows nearby.

The village was first mentioned in 1453 with its present name. In a 1576 source, it was referred to as Kalotine. Kalotina's name is the feminine form of an adjective derived from the personal name Kalota (Калота); it is an ellipse, as no noun is part of the name.

The village has a medieval Bulgarian Orthodox church dedicated to Saint Nicholas which was built in the 14th century during the rule of Ivan Alexander of Bulgaria (as indicated by an inscription in the church). It was richly decorated with murals, although they have been badly preserved. The church donors are thought to have been Deyan and Vladislava from the church in Kučevište, and the church was likely built between 1331 and 1334 or 1337.
