= Dragoman, Bulgaria =

Dragoman Драгоман
- Town
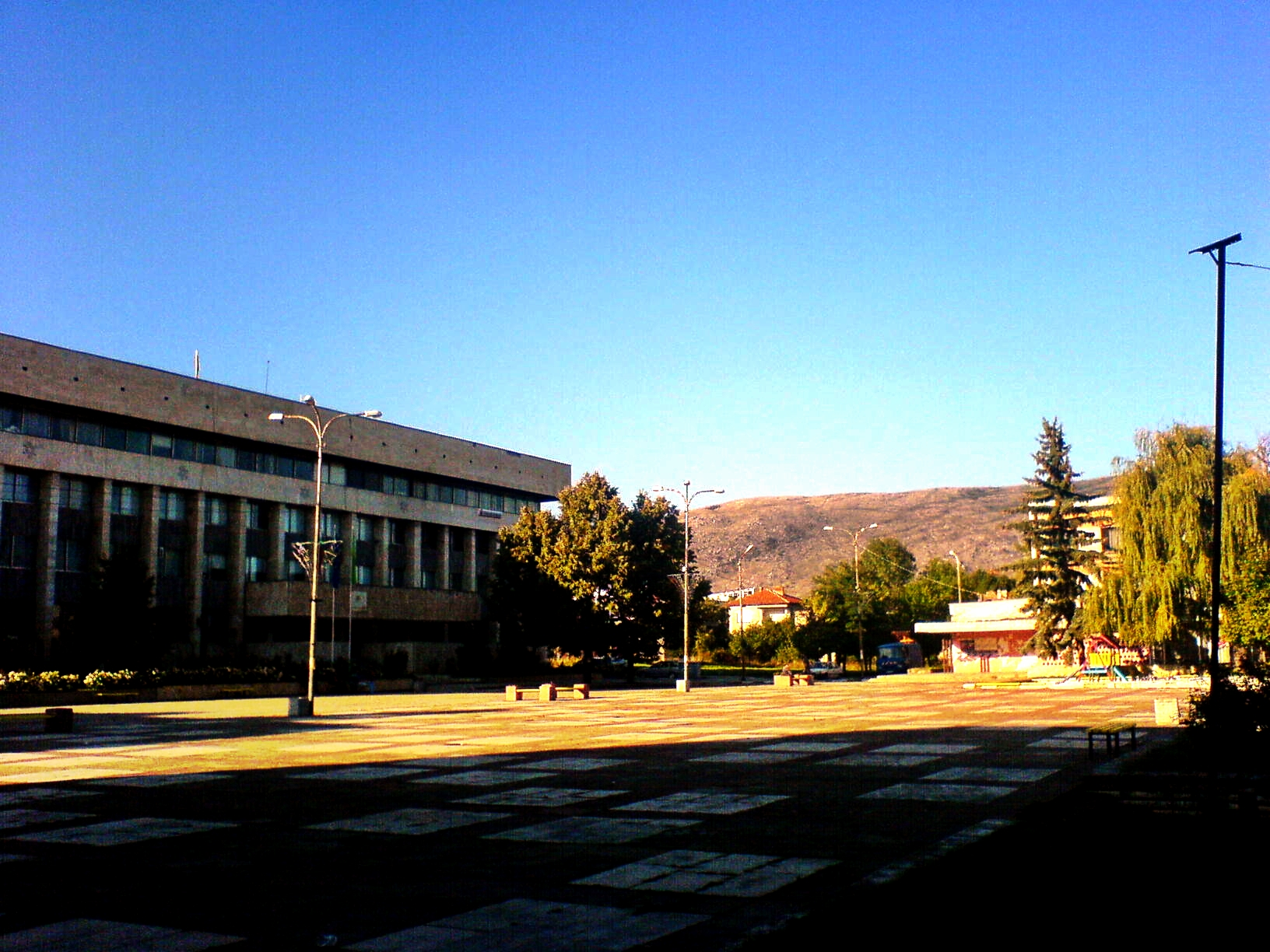
- Dragoman City Center

- Location in Bulgaria
- Coordinates: 42°55′0″N 22°56′0″E
- Country: Bulgaria
- Province: Sofia
- Municipality: Dragoman

Government
  - Mayor: Andrew Ivanov (GERB)

Area
  - Total: 34.475 km^{2} (13.311 sq mi)
- Elevation: 703 m (2,306 ft)

Population (2015)
  - Total: 3,300
- Postal code: 2210
- Area code: 07172
- Vehicle registration: СО

Dragoman (Bulgarian: Драгоман [drɐɡoˈman]) is the seat of Dragoman Municipality in the Sofia Province, western Bulgaria. The town is located very close to the border with Serbia. As of 2011, the population was 5,362.

== Honour ==
Dragoman Glacier on Smith Island, South Shetland Islands is named after Dragoman.
