= Sofia Province =

Province in western Bulgaria

Coordinates: 42°40′N 23°40′E

Sofia Province Софийска област
- Province
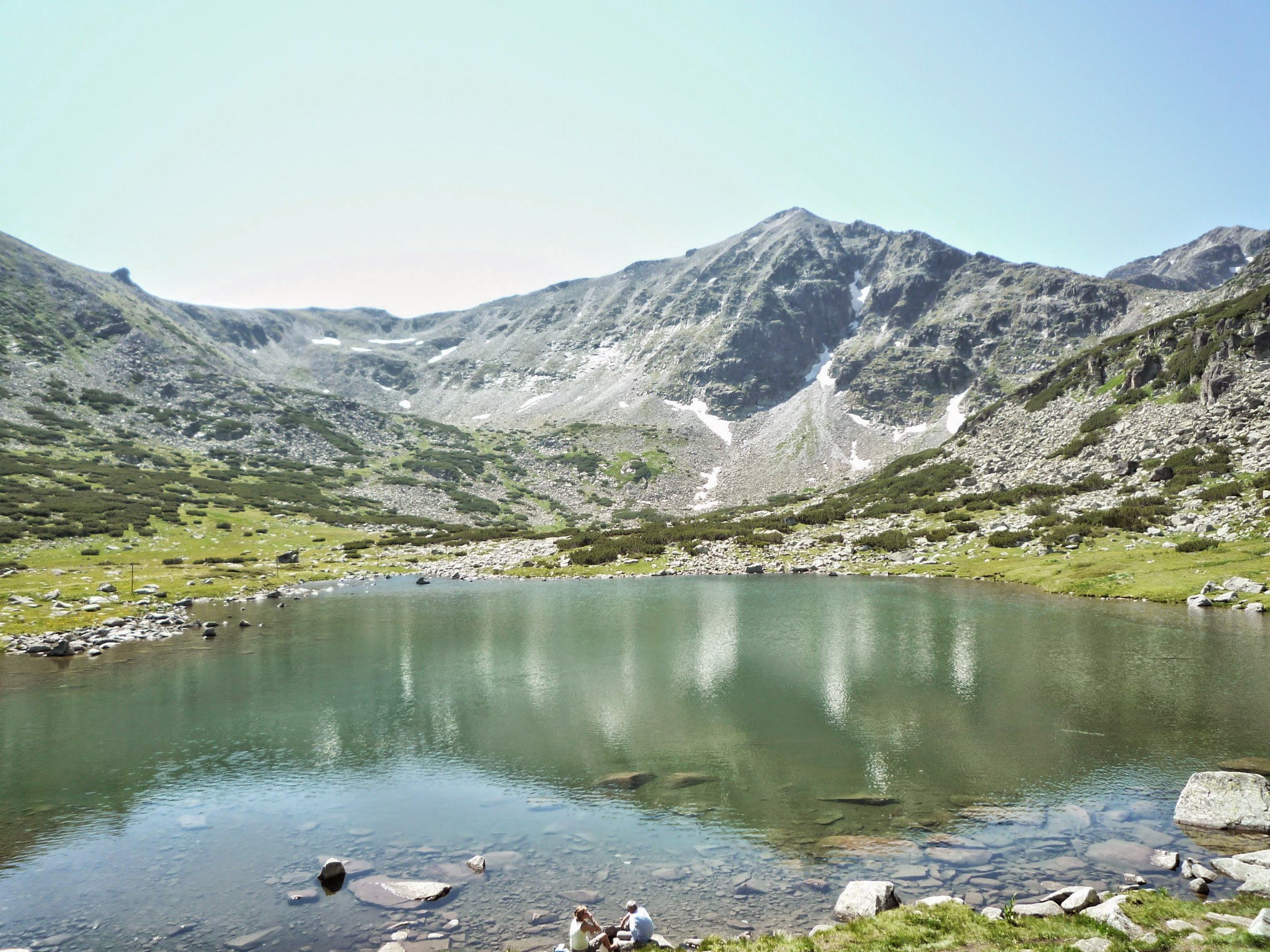
- Musala Lakes

- Flag

- Location of Sofia Province in Bulgaria
- Country: Bulgaria
- Capital: Sofia
- Municipalities: 22

Government
  - Governor: Krasimir Zhivkov

Area
  - Total: 7,059 km^{2} (2,725 sq mi)

Population (2022)
  - Total: 227,610
  - Density: 32.24/km^{2} (83.51/sq mi)
- Time zone: UTC+2 (EET)
  - Summer (DST): UTC+3 (EEST)
- License plate: CO
- Website: sfoblast.bg

Sofia Province (Bulgarian: Софийска област, romanized: Sofiyska oblast) is a province (oblast) of Bulgaria. The province does not include Sofia in its territories, but Sofia remains the seat of its administration. The province borders on the provinces of Pernik, Kyustendil, Blagoevgrad, Pazardzhik, Plovdiv, Lovech, Vratsa, Montana, and Sofia City (which is in a separate oblast, see Sofia Administration), and borders with Serbia to the northwest.

== History ==
=== Prehistory and antiquity ===
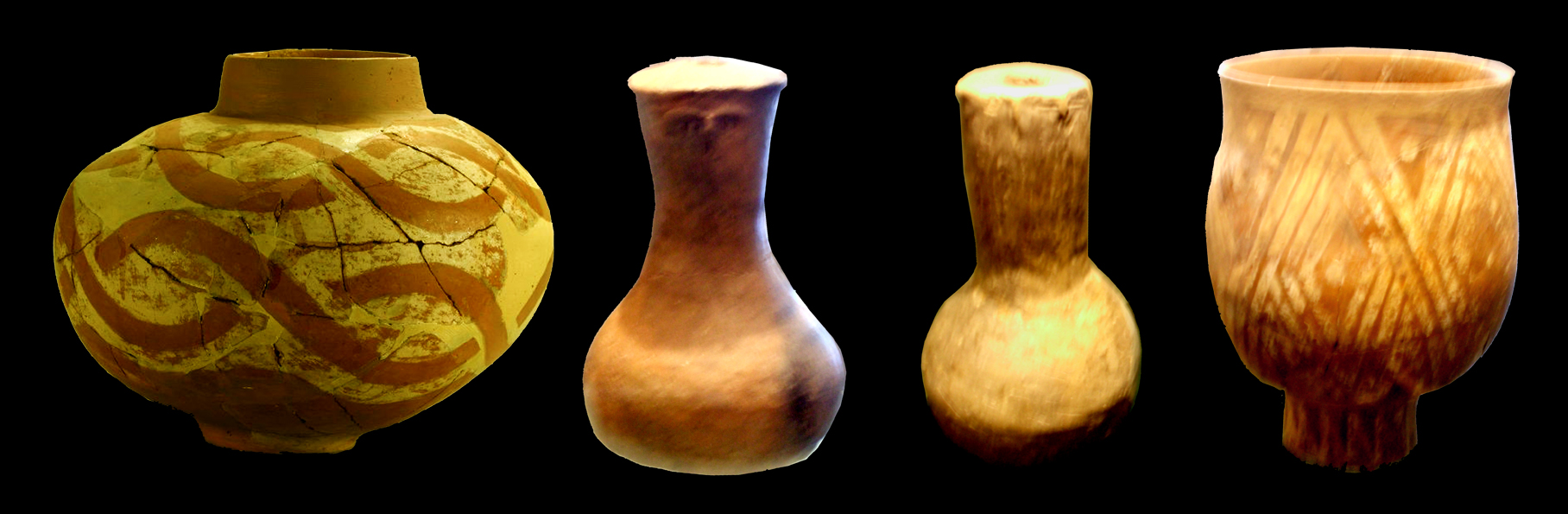
Neolithic pottery discovered near Chavdar

Archaeological excavations near Chavdar suggest that the region has been settled by humans as early as 7,000 years ago. The earliest evidence of a mass settlement dates back to Thracian times, including tumuli (burial mounds) which remain poorly studied. According to Thucydides, the areas north of Vitosha were inhabited by the Tilataei and the Treri. The Triballi were also known to have inhabited the region around Serdica. The Serdi, a Celtic tribe that appeared in place of the vanished Treri and Tilataei, were first mentioned in 29 BC. Roman General Marcus Licinius Crassus began his campaign against the Triballi in that year, and in 27 BC his troops captured Serdica.

Felix Philipp Kanitz, the first person to study the Iskar Gorge area thoroughly, identified eight Roman castella, which he considered proof of the great strategic importance the Romans placed on the gorge. The road passing through it connected Roman lands from Thessaloniki all the way to Dacia. However, up until modern times, the gorge was poorly accessible because of its rugged terrain. As a result, the inhabitants were partially isolated from the rest of the world, self-reliant, but also safe from wars and invasions. Some of the population of Moesia thus found the Iskar river area an appealing safe haven later in the 5th century, when the province was threatened by Hunnic and Gothic raids (see also Collapse of the Western Roman Empire in 476).

=== Middle Ages ===
Gothic assaults were followed by large-scale settlement of South Slavs in territories south of the Danube in the early 580s AD. The Eastern Roman Empire, or Byzantium, was incapable of defending these territories at the time. With most Byzantine troops protecting the rich Asian provinces from Arab and Persian raids, even small and disorganised Slavic attacks caused much disruption throughout Moesia. The numerous Slavs gradually mixed with and assimilated the native population. The area remained under Byzantine control until 809 AD, when Krum captured Serdica and massacred some 6,000 soldiers and civilians. Sometime in the 10th century, construction of the Boyana Church began as well.

Churches and monasteries in the area flourished during the Second Bulgarian Empire. Tsar Ivan Alexander established a ring of 14 monasteries around Sredets (formerly Serdica), with rules and organisation similar to the monastery cluster on Mount Athos, known as Sveta Gora in Bulgarian. The Sveta Gora of Sofia includes temples and monasteries throughout today's Sofia Province, spanning from Plana and Vitosha Mountains in the south to Dragoman and the slopes of Stara Planina in the north. Some of these were established during the First Bulgarian Empire or generally before Ivan Alexander's rule. Apart from these monasteries, a number of other, smaller temples can be traced back to the Second Empire. This includes the Saint Nicholas church in Bukovets, built by Crusaders in the 12th century. Crusader presence was also attested around Bov, which is believed to have been established by an eponymous Fourth Crusade knight who became a vassal of Tsar Kaloyan.

=== Ottoman rule ===
The modern territory of Sofia Province has been part of three of the four revolutionary districts during the April Uprising 1876.

=== Under the Third Bulgarian State ===
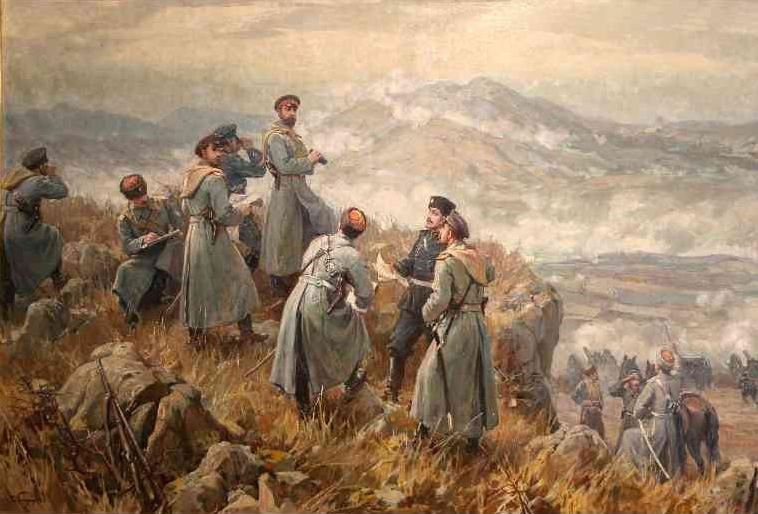
Bulgarian Prince Alexander of Battenberg observing the battles against Serb forces near Dragoman

A few years after Bulgaria's liberation in 1878, Bulgarian nationalists organised a coup in the Ottoman province of Eastern Rumelia and declared its unification with the Principality of Bulgaria. The Kingdom of Serbia opposed the strengthening of its rival. Serbian king Milan I declared war on Bulgaria on 14 November 1885, but the Serbian forces were decisively defeated at the Battle of Slivnitsa between 17 and 19 November. Another decisive Bulgarian victory occurred at Gurgulyat, where Bulgarian soldiers and civilian volunteers fought the Serb Moravian division and prevented it from reinforcing the main Serbian force at Slivnitsa.

During World War II, a number of resistance fighters were based in the area. The mainly Soviet-oriented resistance - the People's Liberation Rebel Army, PLRA - organised locally under the 1st Sofia Rebellion Operations Zone, particularly in the areas around Botevgrad and Ihtiman. Anti-partisan operations by the Bulgarian government military, then part of the Axis powers, had become fierce by 1944. In January 1944, Special Operations Executive Major William Frank Thompson and another British officer, Sergeant Kenneth Scott, were parachuted with radio equipment in southern Yugoslavia; their mission was to provide liaison between the British Army and the PLRA. The two joined a group of 100 ill-equipped Bulgarian partisans and entered Bulgaria in May 1944.

After some initial success, the group was ambushed, and Thompson was captured near Eleshnitsa along with a dozen Bulgarian partisans. After being shown the severed heads of other partisans on pikes, they were tortured by government troops and their paramilitary aides, the Gendarmerie. Because of his Communist sympathies and fluent Bulgarian and Russian, Thompson and the other resistance fighters were executed by a firing squad. Several villages in the area were merged after the war into what is now a single village, Thompson, named after the British officer.

== Geography ==
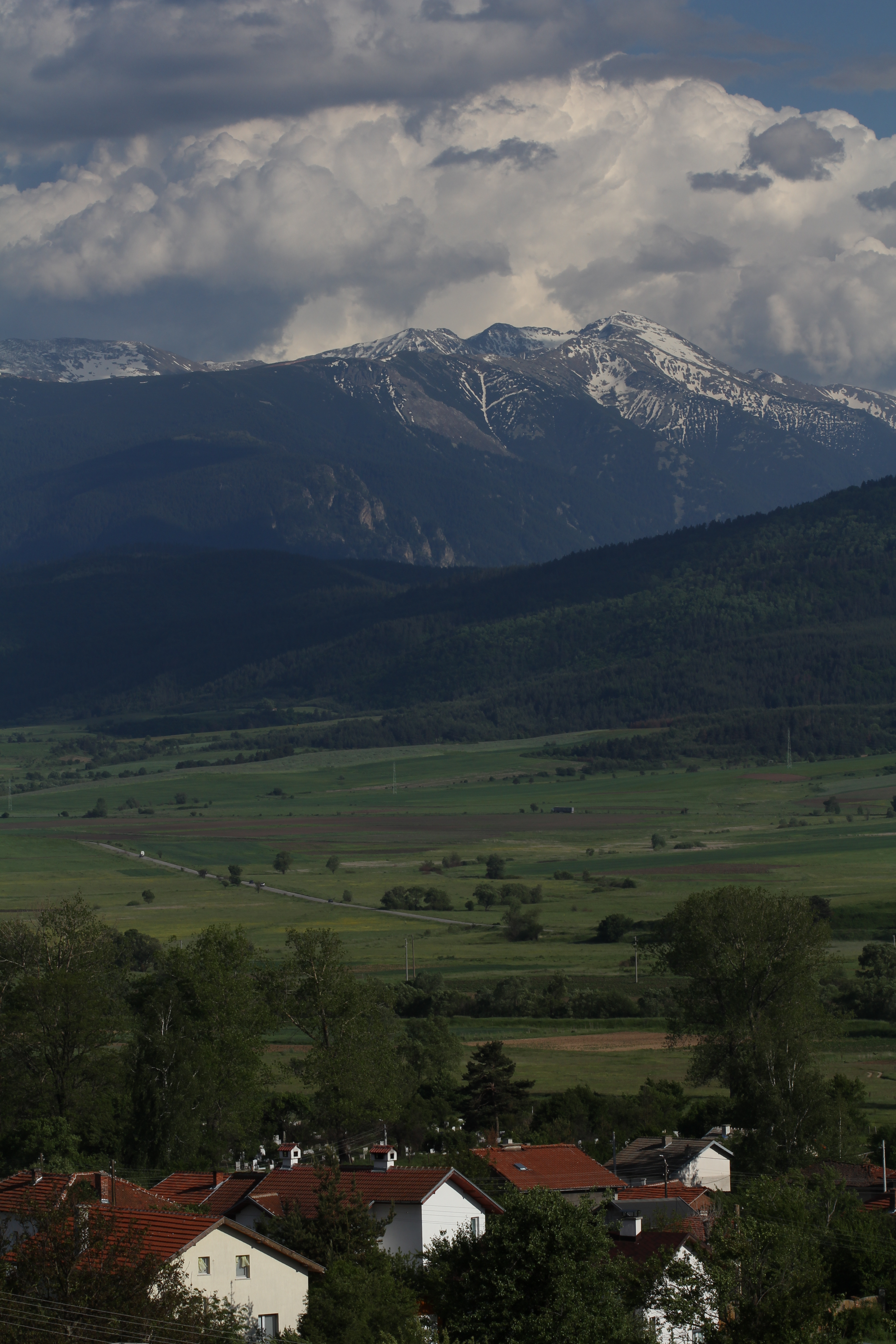
Rila Mountain as seen from Relyovo, Samokov Municipality

With a territory of 7 020 km², Sofia Province is the second-largest in Bulgaria. It also has the highest number of municipalities, 22, and borders nine other provinces as well as Serbia to the northwest. The lowest areas stand at 350 metres above sea level, whereas the highest rise above 2,900 metres, resulting in diverse terrain, soil and climatic factors.

A temperate climate with cold winters, cool springs and mild summers hampers the agricultural use of the otherwise fertile mountain valleys that include five of the eleven Sub-Balkan valleys — Burel, Sofia, Saranska, Kamarska, Zlatitsa–Pirdop, as well as the valleys of Botevgrad, Zlatitsa–Samokov and Kostenets–Dolna Banya. Stara Planina, Sredna Gora and Rila are the principal mountain ranges that the province straddles, while Plana and Vitosha lie entirely within its territory. The highest peak on the Balkan Peninsula, Musala, rises 2,925 metres above sea level in Rila at the southern end of the province.

The precise height of Musala was only measured in 1932 by an expedition of the State Geographic Institute of the Ministry of War. Previously, Vihren in southwest Bulgaria was imprecisely measured and proclaimed to be the country's highest peak. This made Mytikas on Mount Olympus in Greece, which rose only three metres higher than Vihren, the highest on the Balkan Peninsula. Locals in Bulgaria supposedly began piling up rocks on Vihren over time to restore its status, but the 1932 military expedition measured both Vihren and Musala with a margin of error of only 15 centimetres and thus put an end to the rivalry.

Rila is also the source of the Iskar, the longest river that runs entirely within Bulgarian territory. It is a tributary to the Danube and forms part of the Black Sea river basin. The 23 km (14 mi) long Cherni (black) Iskar is considered the main stem of the river, taking its source from the Chamovsko Lake (2,500 m) to the north-east of Damga Peak (2,669 m) and from there the river flows in north-eastern direction through the Govedartsi Valley, filled by the waters of the Chanakgyolski, Malyovishki and Urdini Lakes. The river enters the Balkan Mountains at the town of Novi Iskar and forms a long and spectacular gorge, whose slopes reach a height of 200 m up to 500 m at some points. The Iskar Gorge reaches a length of 70 km (43 mi) between its beginning at Kurilo, a neighbourhood of Novi Iskar, and the village of Lyutibrod where it ends. Other rivers flowing through the province's territory are Topolnitsa, Nishava and Maritsa, and larger bodies of water include 60 barrages and dams.

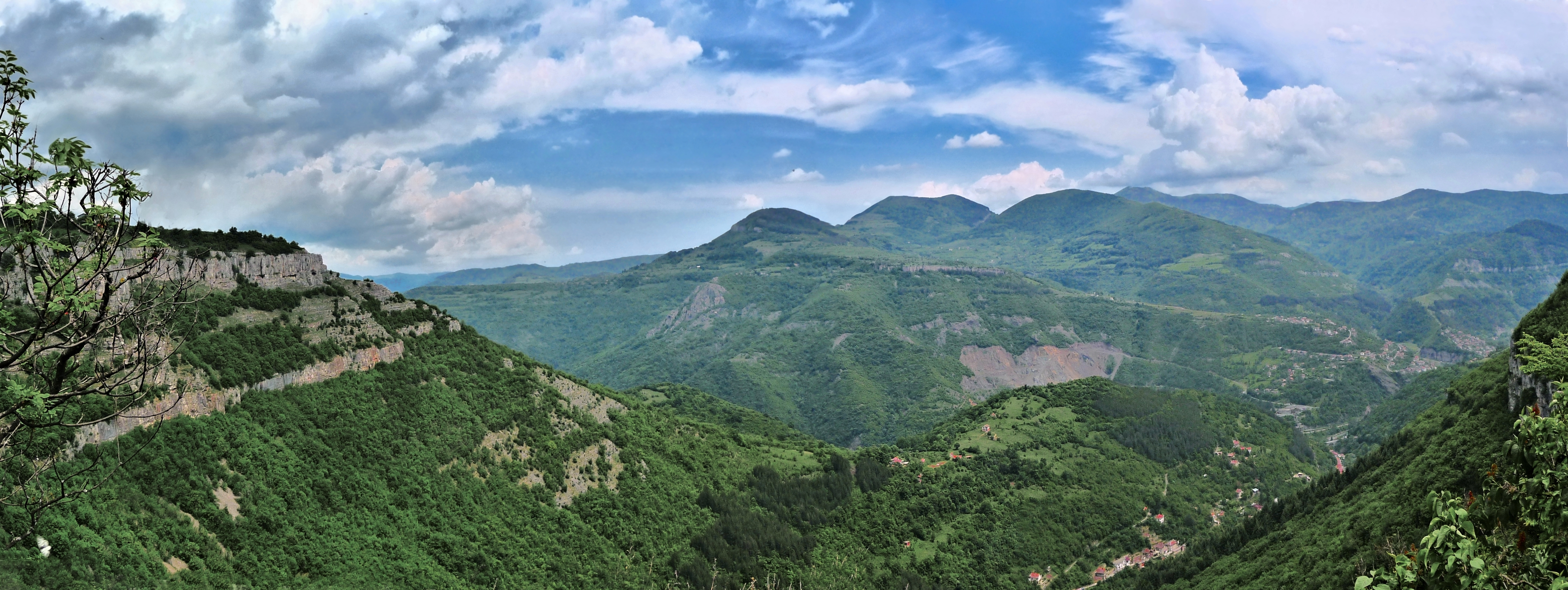
Panoramic view of the Iskar Gorge near Zasele

== Demographics ==
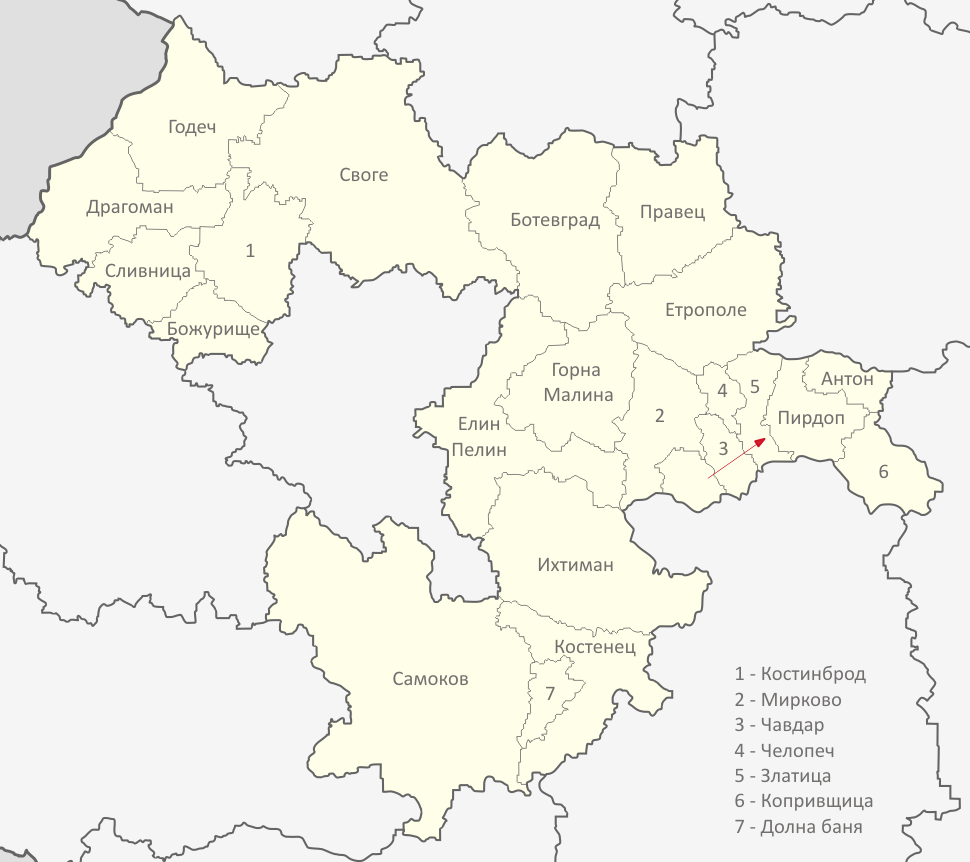
Municipalities of Sofia province

Historical population
Year	Pop.	±%
1946	319,045	—
1956	313,906	−1.6%
1965	306,913	−2.2%
1975	310,975	+1.3%
1985	305,358	−1.8%
1992	289,962	−5.0%
2001	273,240	−5.8%
2011	247,489	−9.4%
2021	231,989	−6.3%
Source: pop-stat.mashke.org

Sofia Province has 247,489 inhabitants according to the 2011 Bulgarian Census.

The Sofia province (Област, oblast) contains 22 municipalities (singular: община, obshtina - plural: Общини, obshtini). The following table shows the names of each municipality in English and Cyrillic, the main town (in bold) or village, and the population of each as of 2009.

Municipality	Cyrillic	Pop.	Town/Village	Pop.
Anton	Антон	1,650	Anton	1,650
Botevgrad	Ботевград	36,183	**Botevgrad**	23,694
Bozhurishte	Божурище	6,735	**Bozhurishte**	4,829
Chavdar	Чавдар	1,252	Chavdar	1,252
Chelopech	Челопеч	1,571	Chelopech	1,571
Dolna Banya	Долна баня	4,917	**Dolna Banya**	4,917
Dragoman	Драгоман	5,373	**Dragoman**	3,541
Elin Pelin	Елин Пелин	22,015	**Elin Pelin**	7,293
Etropole	Етрополе	13,773	**Etropole**	12,078
Godech	Годеч	5,670	**Godech**	4,783
Gorna Malina	Горна Малина	5,668	Gorna Malina	1,357
Ihtiman	Ихтиман	18,903	**Ihtiman**	14,571
Koprivshtitsa	Копривщица	2,547	**Koprivshtitsa**	2,547
Kostenets	Костенец	14,154	**Kostenets**	7,762
Kostinbrod	Костинброд	16,145	**Kostinbrod**	11,523
Mirkovo	Мирково	2,534	Mirkovo	1,707
Pirdop	Пирдоп	9,217	**Pirdop**	8,361
Pravets	Правец	7,919	**Pravets**	4,440
Samokov	Самоков	41,544	**Samokov**	30,085
Slivnitsa	Сливница	9,511	**Slivnitsa**	7,790
Svoge	Своге	22,557	**Svoge**	8,741
Zlatitsa	Златица	6,274	**Zlatitsa**	5,529

The province had a population of 273 252 (also given as 273,240) according to a 2001 census, of which 49.2% were male and 50.8% were female.

=== Ethnic groups ===
Ethnic groups in Sofia Province (2011 census)
Ethnic group	Percentage
Bulgarians	91.4%
Romani	7.4%
others and indefinable	1.2%

Total population (2011 census): 247 489

Ethnic groups (2011 census): Identified themselves: 230 781 persons:

- Bulgarians: 210 974 (91,42%)
- Romani: 17 079 (7,40%)
- Others and indefinable: 2 728 (1,18%)

Ethnic groups in the province according to 2001 census: 253 536 Bulgarians (92.8%),
16 748 Romani (6.1%) and 2956 others and unspecified (1.1%).

=== Religion ===
Religions in Sofia Province (2011 census)
Religious group	Percentage
Orthodox Christian	67.72%
Protestant Christian	1.2%
Catholic Christian	0.26%
Muslim	0.2%
others and indefinable	30.58%

Religious adherence in the province according to 2001 census:

Census 2001
religious adherence	population	%
Orthodox Christians	261 996	95.9%
Muslims	3 368	1.2%
Protestants	2 320	0.8%
Roman Catholics	186	0.1%
Other	1027	0.4%
Religion not mentioned	4 343	1.6%
**total**	**273,240**	100%

== Economy ==
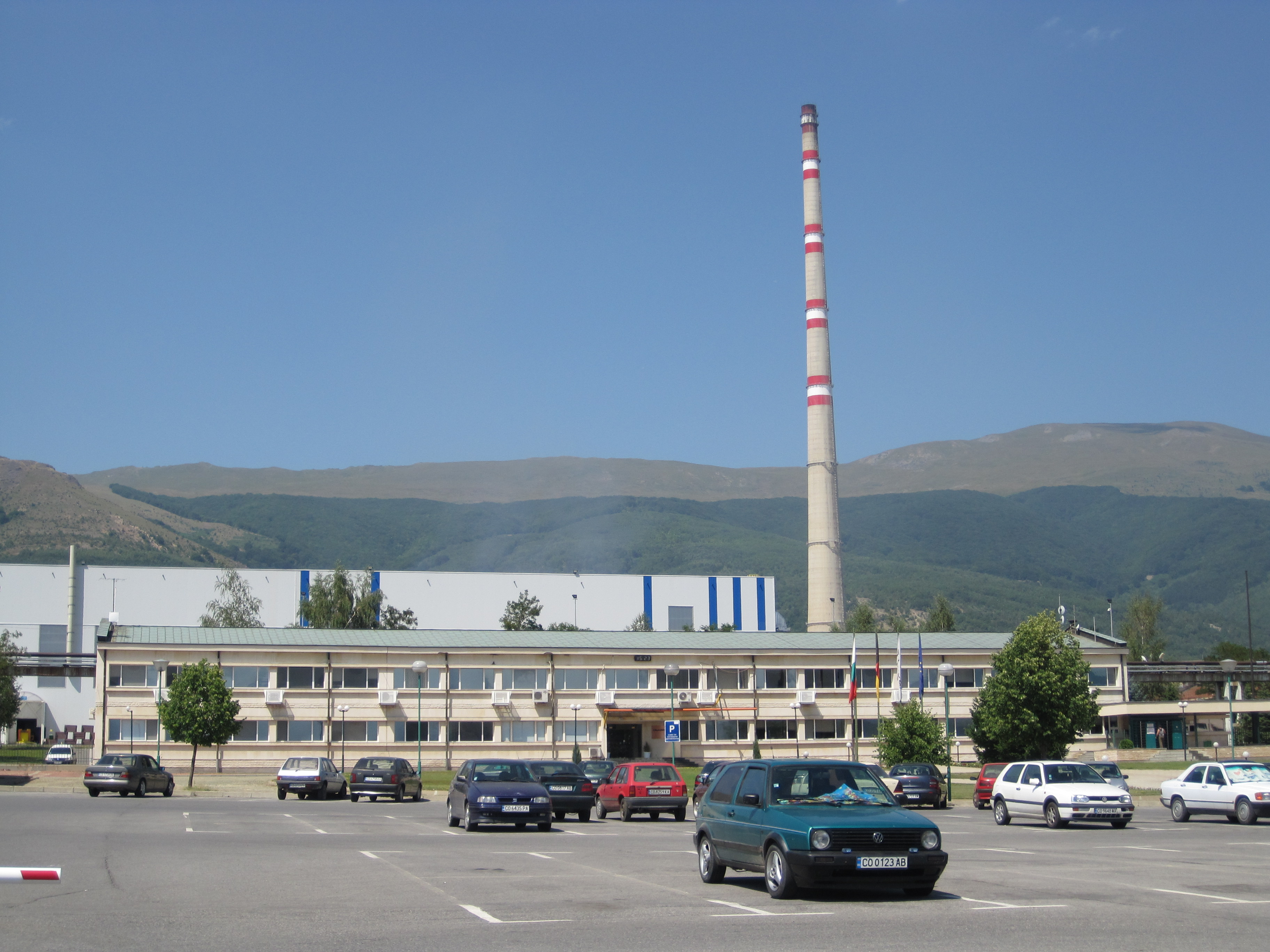
The copper smelter in Pirdop

Sofia Province's Gross regional product (GRP) was 3.11 billion leva ($1.84 billion) in 2016, with a per capita value of 13,203 leva ($7810), the third-highest nationally. That year, some 9,000 companies produced 8.12 billion leva ($4.8 billion) worth of goods and services. Nearly two-thirds of businesses are in the processing sector and operate at a profit.

Mining has been developed on a large scale since the 1950s. The Chelopech copper mine opened in 1954 and has since produced 19.7 million tonnes of ore, peaking at 512,000 tonnes annually in 1988. In 1958, a copper smelter and refinery near Pirdop began operations and blended concentrates from Chelopech and two other mines in the area, Elatsite and Assarel. Since its privatisation in 1997, the smelter has become Bulgaria's second-largest company as a subsidiary of Aurubis. Canadian company Dundee Precious Metals Inc. has acquired the Chelopech mine, where gold concentrate is currently extracted alongside copper.

Mondelez Bulgaria (formerly Kraft Foods Bulgaria) is the largest confectionery producer nationally, largely owing to the production capacity of its chocolate factory in Svoge. The factory was established in 1901, privatised in 1993, and upgraded in 2008 to produce up to 365,000,000 chocolate bars annually. Beverages are manufactured near Kostinbrod, where the largest instant coffee factory in Southeast Europe, as well as the main Coca-Cola bottling facility in Bulgaria, are located.

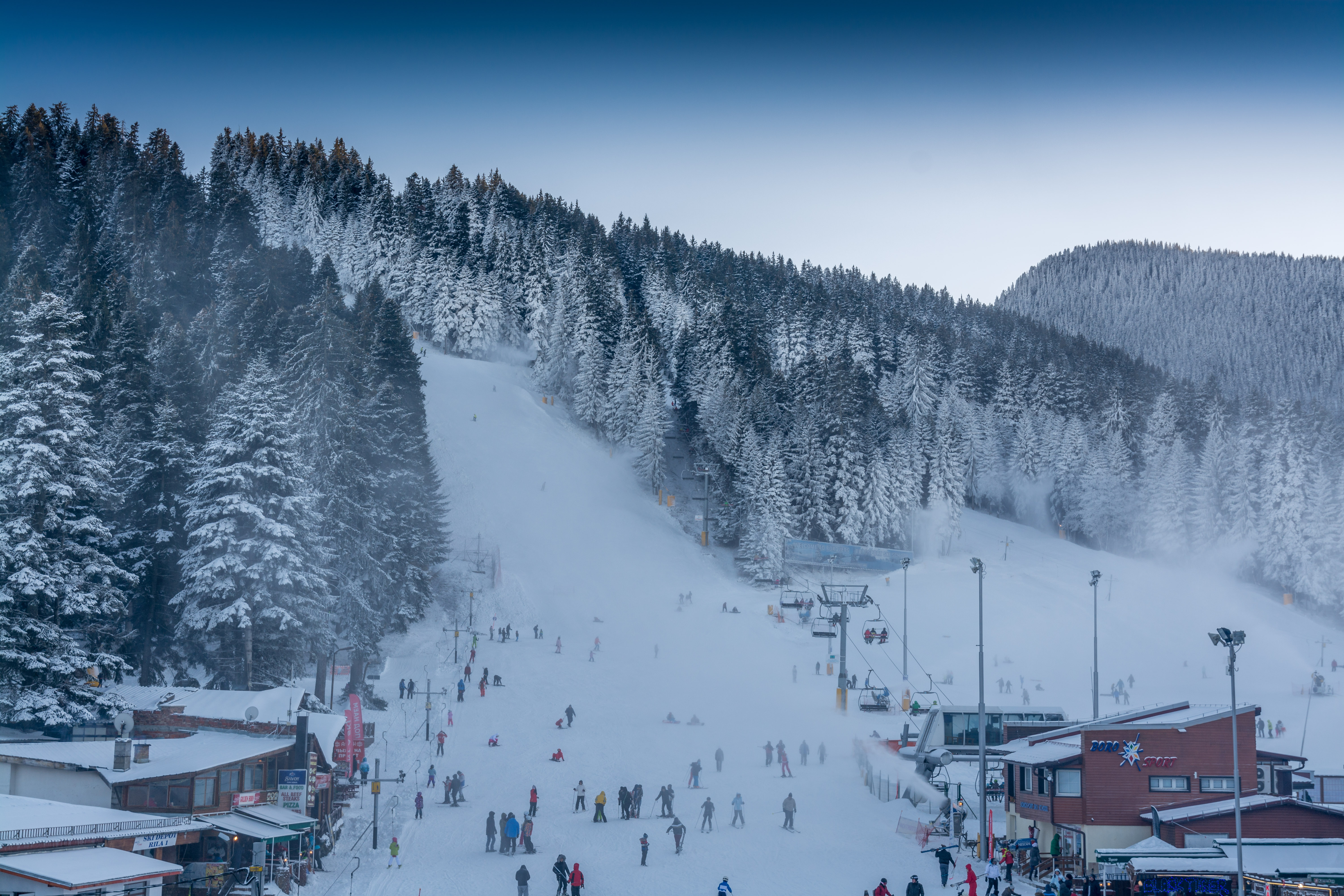
Ski slopes at the Borovets resort

Botevgrad is a major microelectronics R&D and manufacturing centre. Microchips, integrated circuits, sensors and automotive electronics are all produced by private companies on the grounds of the former "Mikroelektronika" state-owned factories. Computer manufacturing was also thriving in Pravets during the Socialist era and by 1988 Bulgaria seemed set to become a major exporter of computers to the West. Pravetz models manufactured in the town accounted for 40% of all computers used in the Eastern Bloc in the 1980s. The Pravets manufacturing plant became defunct after the collapse of Communism, but a high-voltage electronics factory owned by Siemens has taken its place.

Bulgaria's oldest ski resort, Borovets, is located near Samokov. Its high annual influx of tourists has given a boost to the local property market and has drawn foreign investment in hospitality and recreation.

== See also ==
- Provinces of Bulgaria
- Municipalities of Bulgaria
- List of cities and towns in Bulgaria
- List of villages in Sofia Province
