= Dragoman Municipality =

Coordinates: 42.9220°N 22.9301°E

Dragoman Municipality Община Драгоман
- Municipality
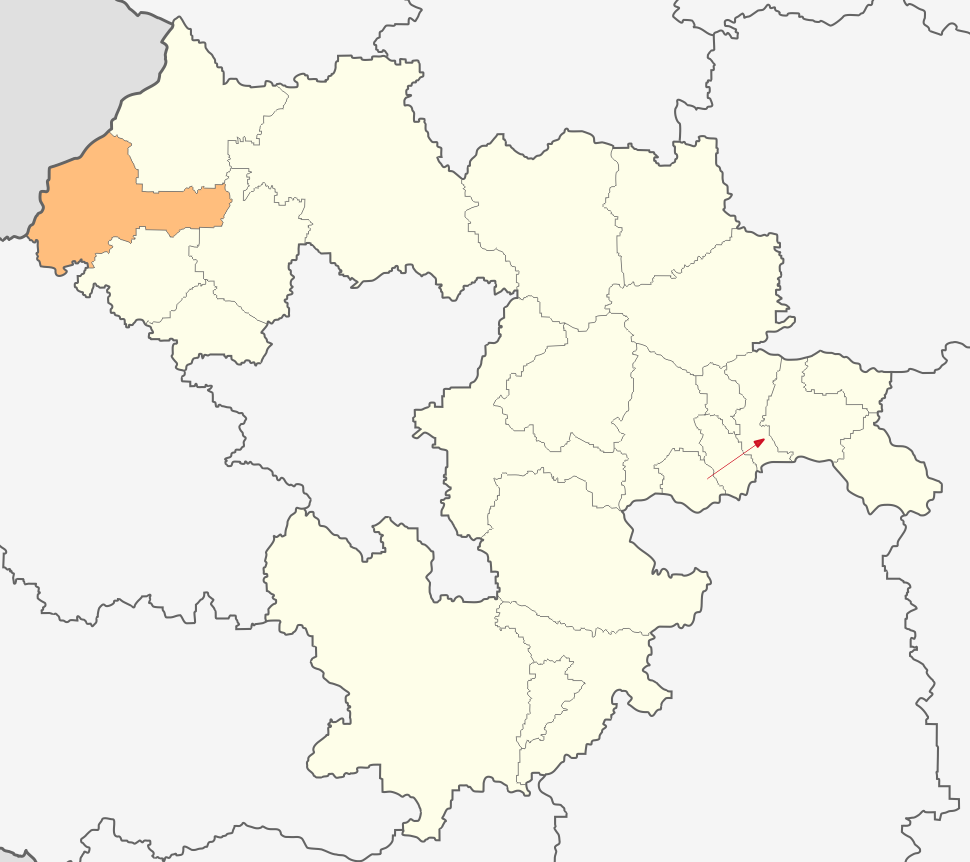
- Country: Bulgaria
- Province: Sofia Province
- Seat: Dragoman

Dragoman Municipality is a municipality in Sofia Province, Bulgaria.

== Demography ==
According to the 2011 census, there are 5,362 people living in the municipality of Dragoman, down from 17,187 people in 1934. Most inhabitants live in the town of Dragoman (3,368 people), followed by the villages of Gaber (541 people) and Kalotina (250 people).

=== Religion ===
According to the latest Bulgarian census of 2011, the religious composition, among those who answered the optional question on religious identification, was the following:

Religious composition of Dragoman Municipality
Orthodox Christianity	93.0%
Catholicism	0.3%
Protestantism	0.2%
Islam	0.1%
No religion	2.0%
Prefer not to answer, others and indefinable	4.4%
