= Karlievo =

Karlievo Карлиево
- Village
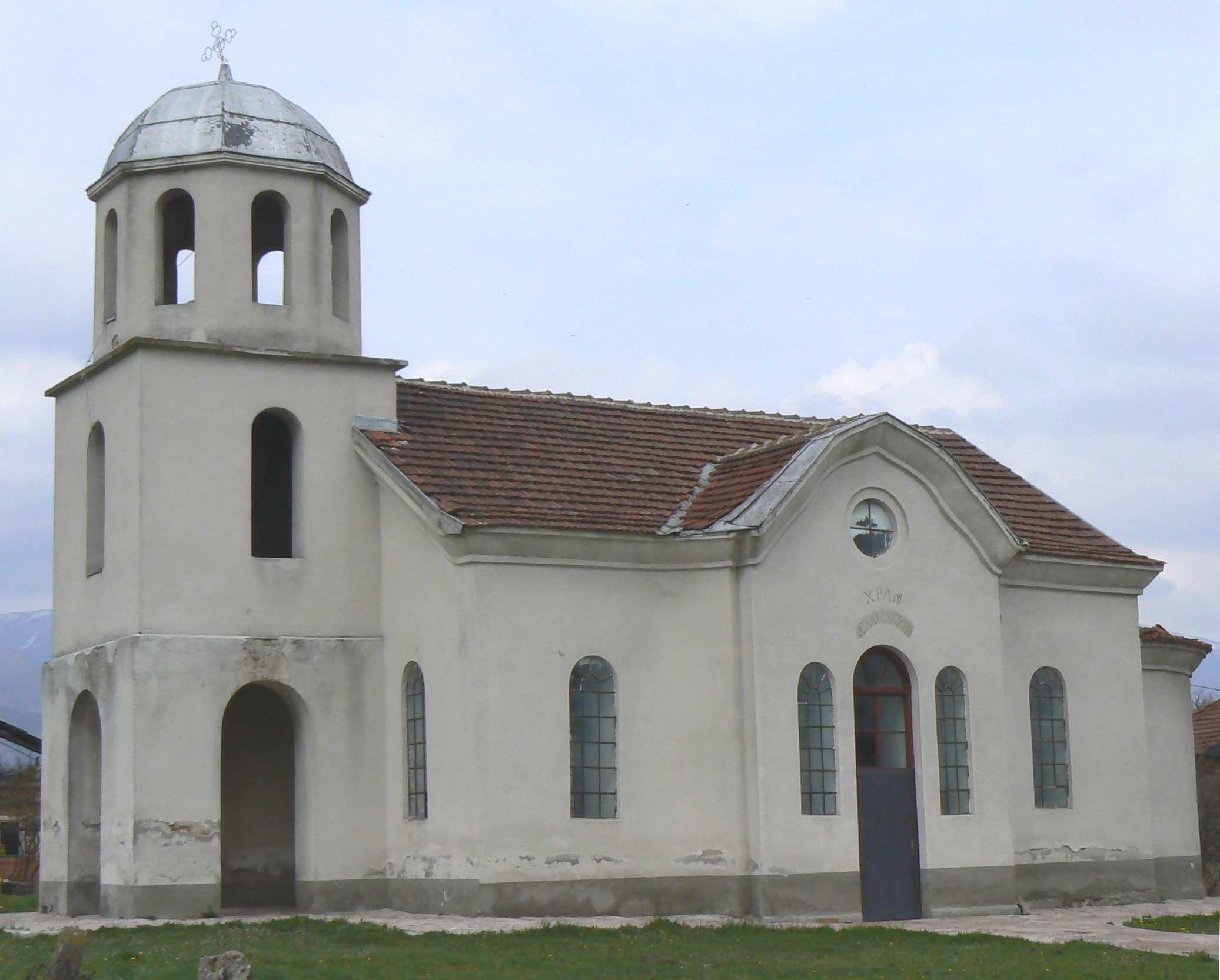

- Location of Karlievo
- Coordinates: 42°41′N 24°7′E
- Country: Bulgaria
- Provinces (Oblast): Sofia Province

Government
  - Mayor: Ivan Ivanov (BSP)

Area
  - Total: 18.097 km^{2} (6.987 sq mi)
- Elevation: 635 m (2,083 ft)

Population (2007-01-01)
  - Total: 245
  - Density: 13.5/km^{2} (35.1/sq mi)
- Time zone: UTC+2 (EET)
  - Summer (DST): UTC+3 (EEST)
- Postal Code: 2088

Karlievo (Bulgarian: Карлиево) is a village in western Bulgaria. It is located in the municipality of Zlatitsa, in Sofia Province. As of 2007 the village had 245 inhabitants.

== Geography ==
Karlievo is situated in a mountainous region in the Sredna Gora mountains. The nearest village is Chelopech at 2 km to the west. Most of the population is employed in the large copper and gold mines in the surrounding region or in Cumerio Med between Zlatitsa and Pirdop - the largest copper smelter and refinery in the Balkan Peninsula.

== Gallery ==
Karlievo

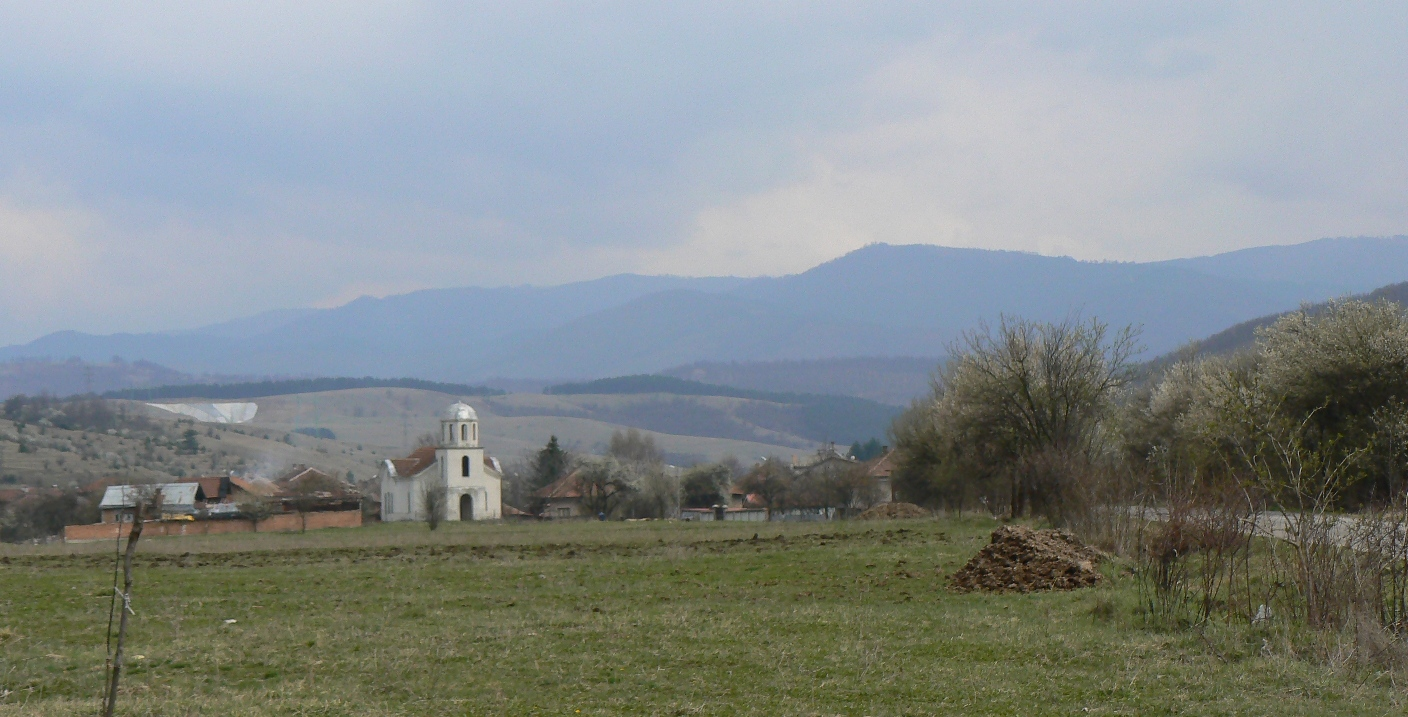
The village

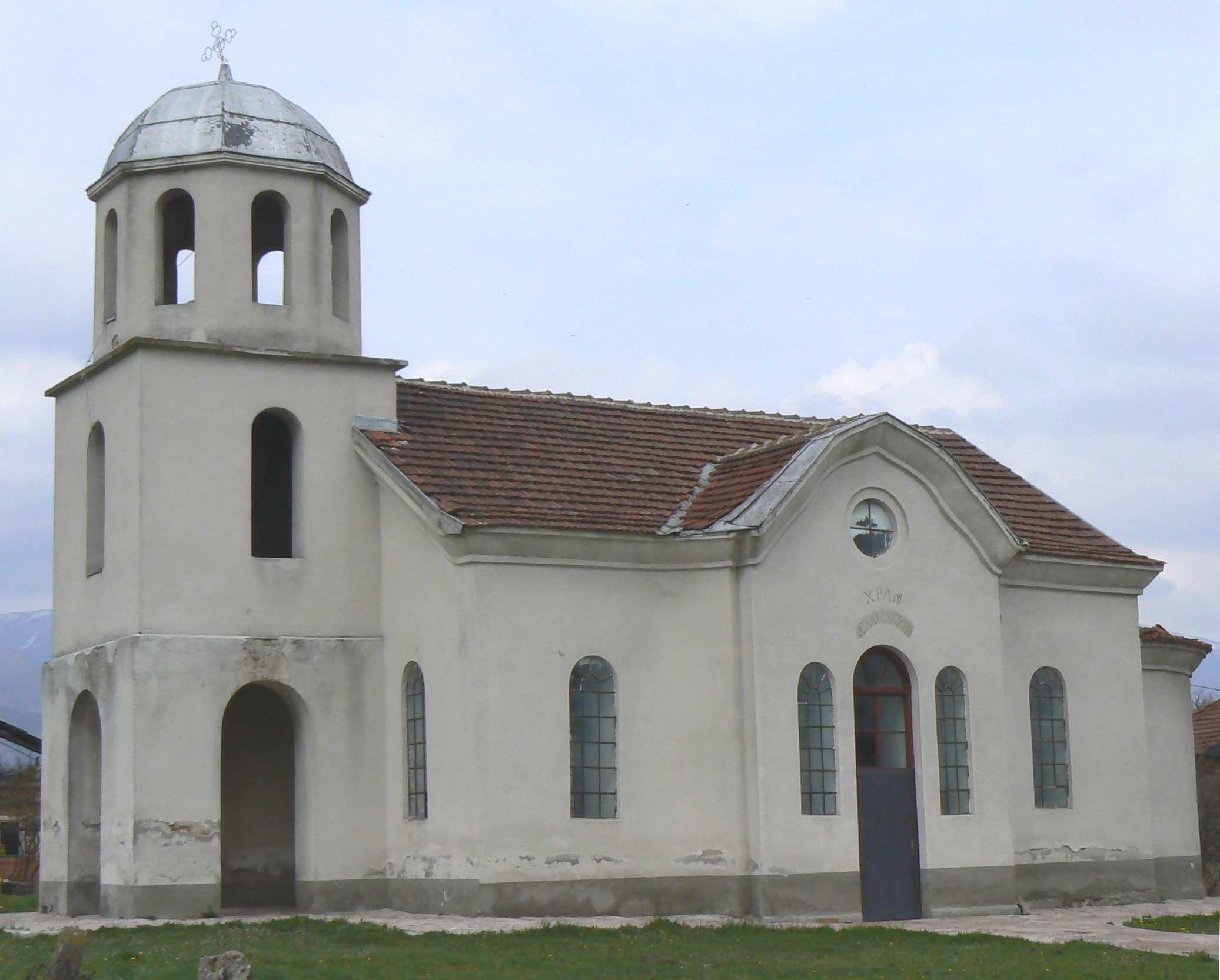
St. Eustatius Church

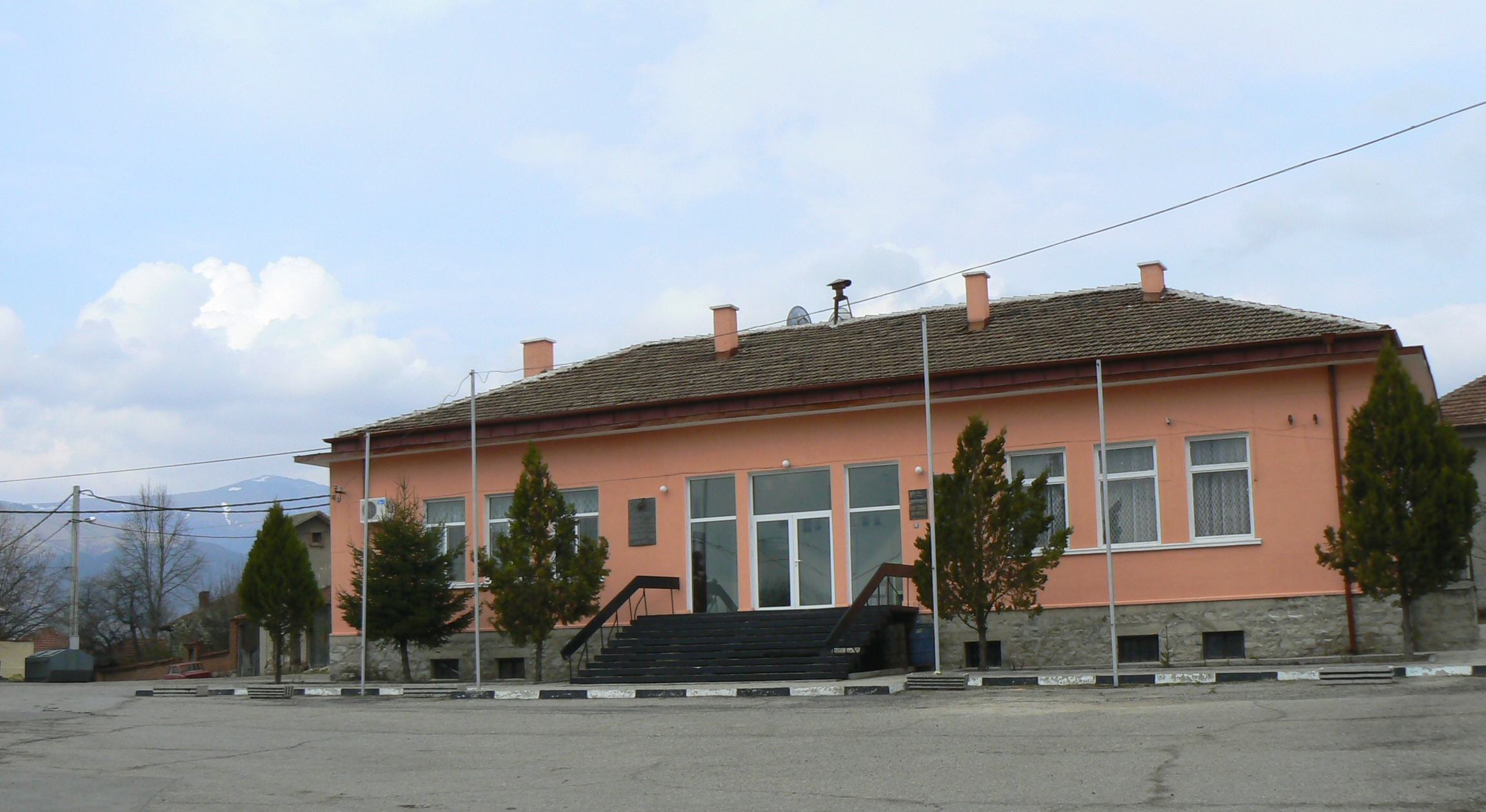
Village Hall
