= Pirdop Municipality =

Coordinates: 42°42′0″N 24°10′59″E

Pirdop Municipality Община Пирдоп
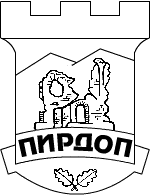
- Coat of arms

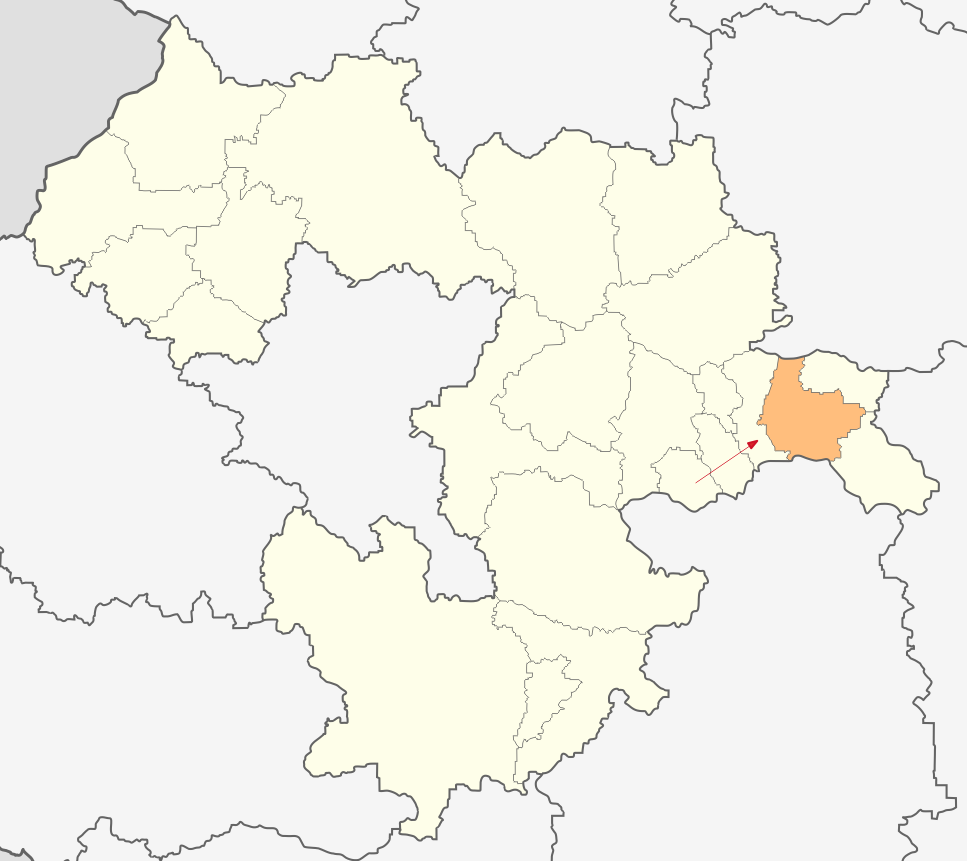
- Country: Bulgaria
- Province: Sofia Province
- Seat: Pirdop

Area
  - Total: 152.4 km^{2} (58.8 sq mi)

Population (2024)
  - Total: 6,887
  - Density: 45.19/km^{2} (117.0/sq mi)
- Website: pirdop.bg/bg/

Pirdop Municipality (Bulgarian: Община Пирдоп) is a municipality in Sofia Province, central western Bulgaria. Covering a territory of 152.4 km^{2}, it is the 16th largest of the 22 municipalities in the province and takes 2.15% of its total area.

== Geography ==
The relief of the municipality is varied. To the north lies the main ridge of the Balkan Mountains. In the central part is the eastern half of the Zlatitsa–Pirdop Valley, part of the chain of the eleven Sub-Balkan valleys. To the south are the northern slopes of the Sredna Gora mountain range. The highest point is of the municipality is an unnamed summit in the Balkan Mountains, reaching 2,029 m.

The main water artery is the river Topolnitsa, a left tributary of the Maritsa of the Aegean Sea basin. Along its course are the Zhekov Vir and Dushantsi Reservoirs, as well as the tailings dam of the Asarel Medet copper mine in the neighbouring Panagyurishte Municipality.

== Transport ==
Pirdop Municipality is traversed by a 7 km stretch of the first class I-6 road Gyueshevo–Sofia–Karlovo–Burgas of the national road network. There are several local roads. A 6.4 km section of railway line No. 3 Sofia–Karlovo–Sliven–Karnobat–Varna runs through the municipality.

== Demography ==
Historical population
Year	Pop.	±%
1934	4,579	—
1946	4,936	+7.8%
1956	6,776	+37.3%
1965	9,559	+41.1%
1975	10,801	+13.0%
1985	11,020	+2.0%
1992	9,579	−13.1%
2001	9,352	−2.4%
2011	8,293	−11.3%
2021	7,281	−12.2%
Source: National Statistics Institute

There are two settlements, the town of Pirdop and the village of Dushantsi. As of 2024 the population is 6,887.

== Gallery ==
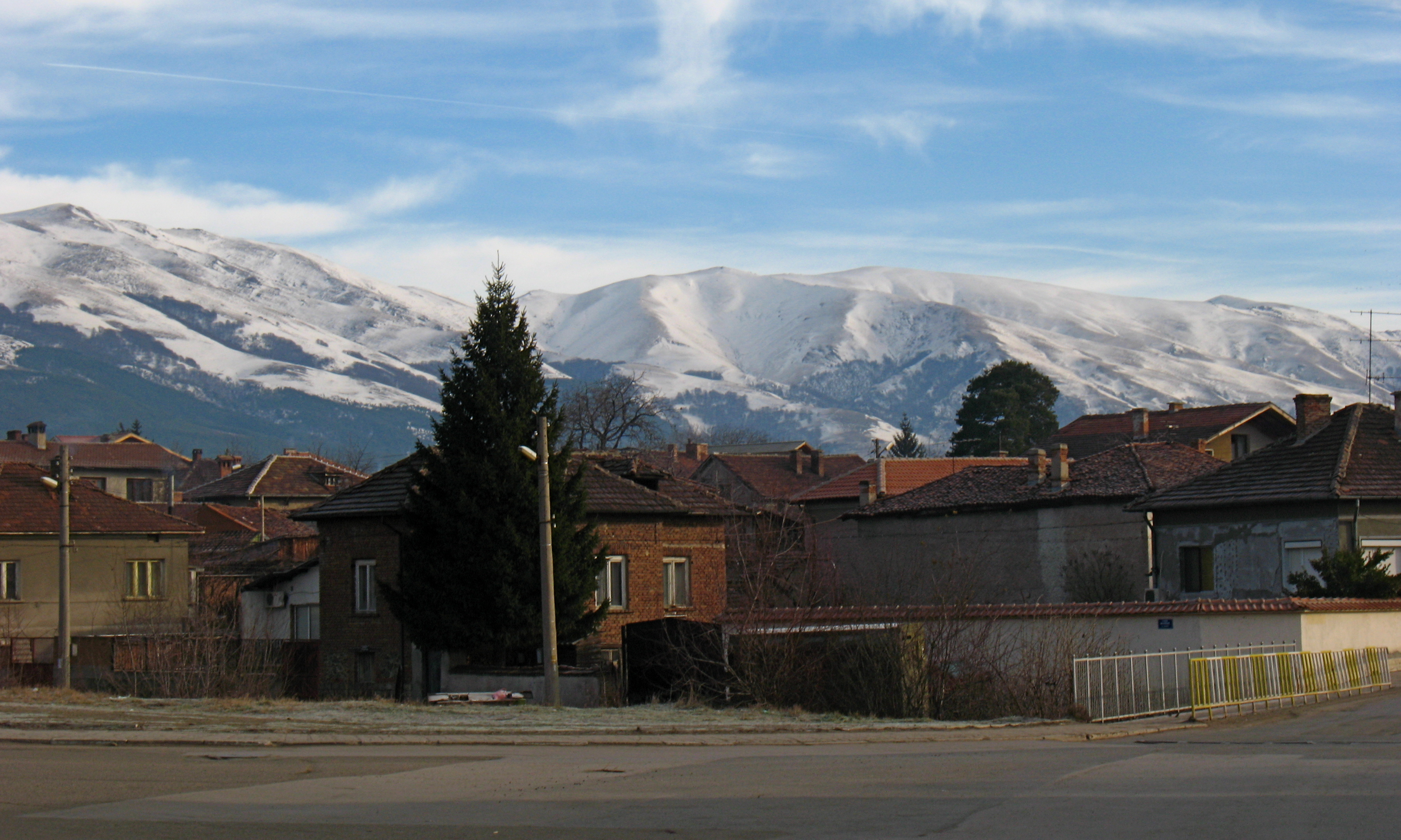
Pirdop and the Balkan Mountains

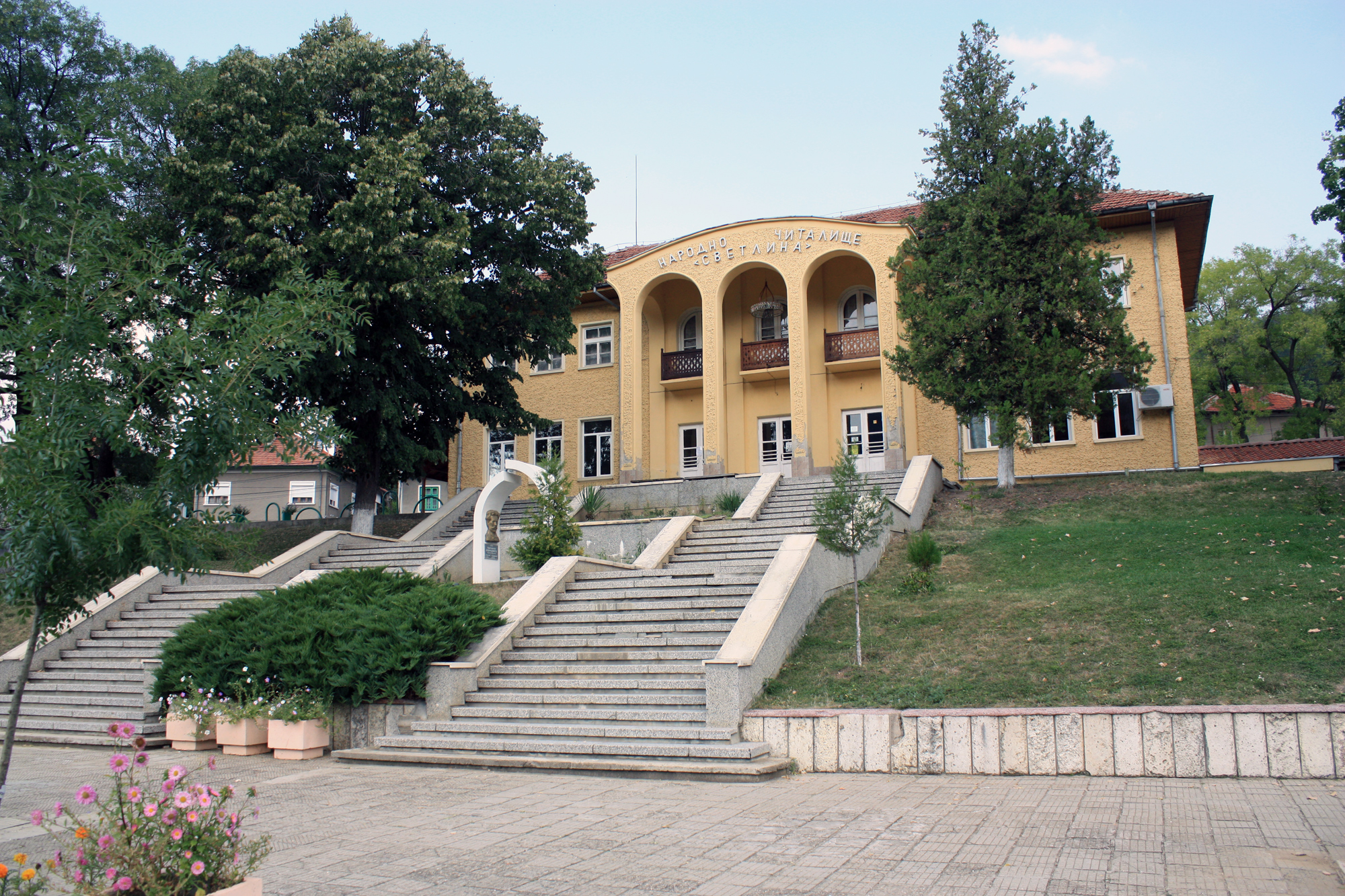
The chitalishte at Dushantsi

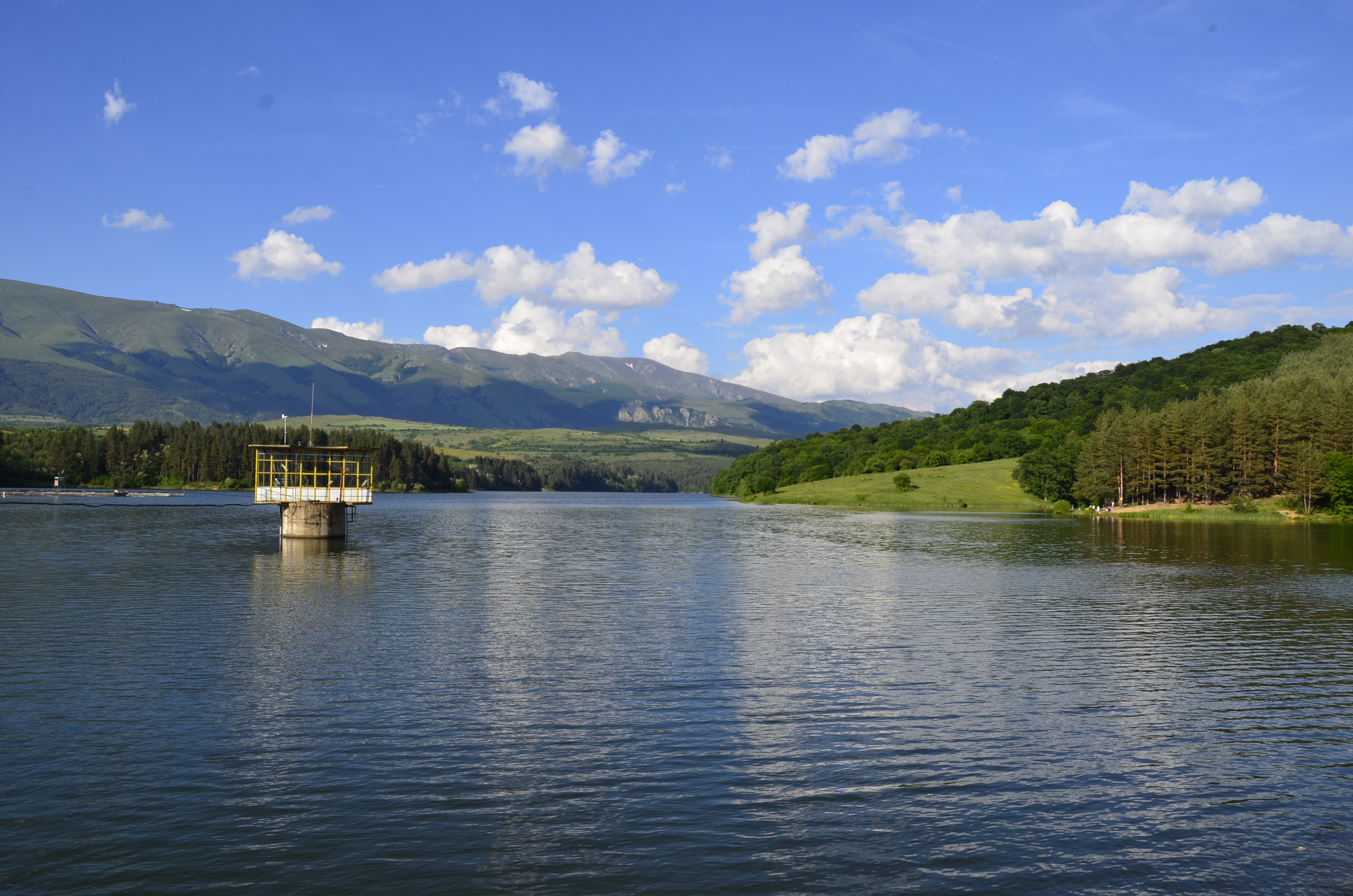
Dushantsi Reservoir

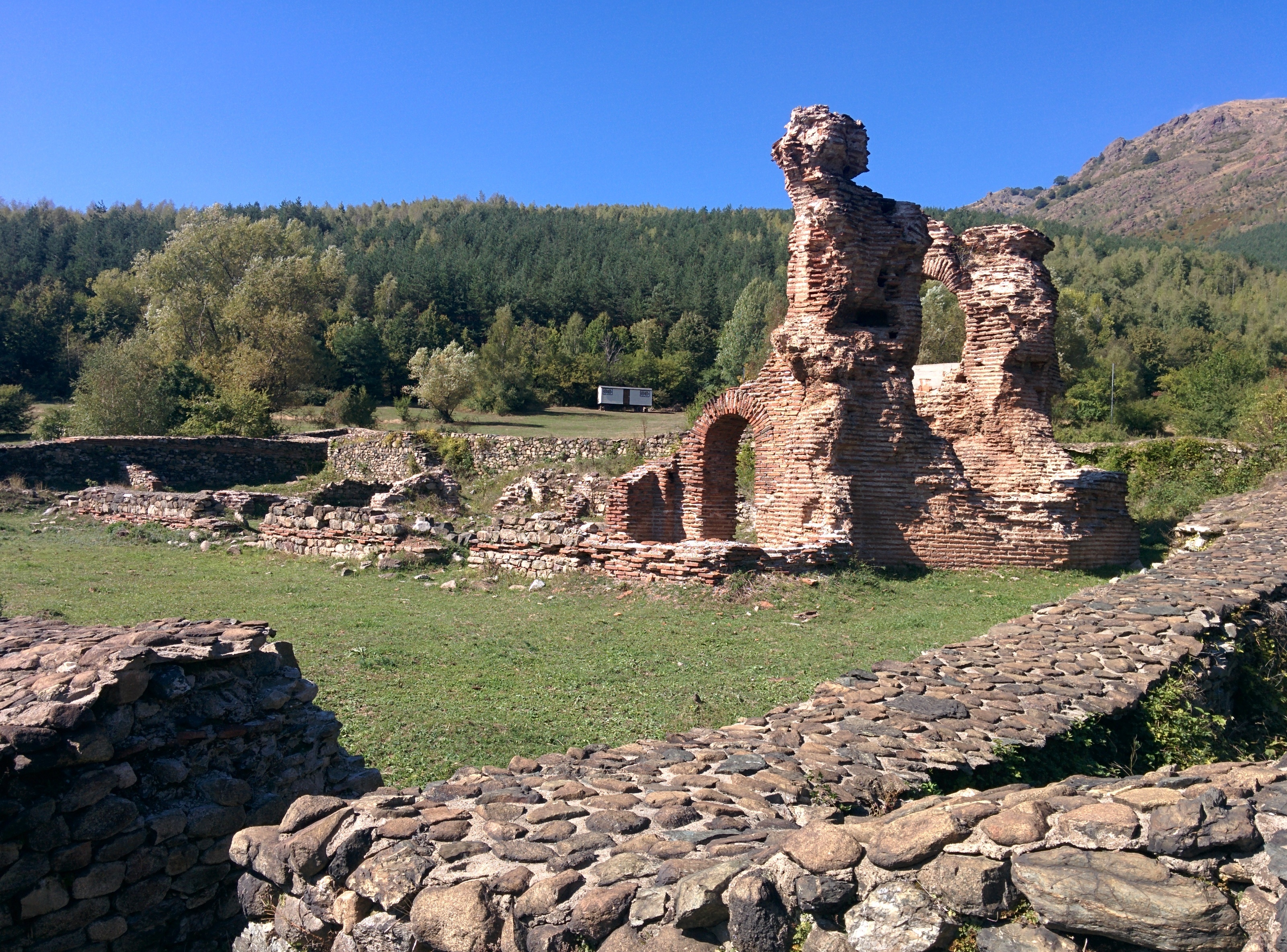
The ruins of the medieval Elenska Basilica
