= Zlatitsa–Pirdop Valley =

Valley in Bulgaria

- Valley
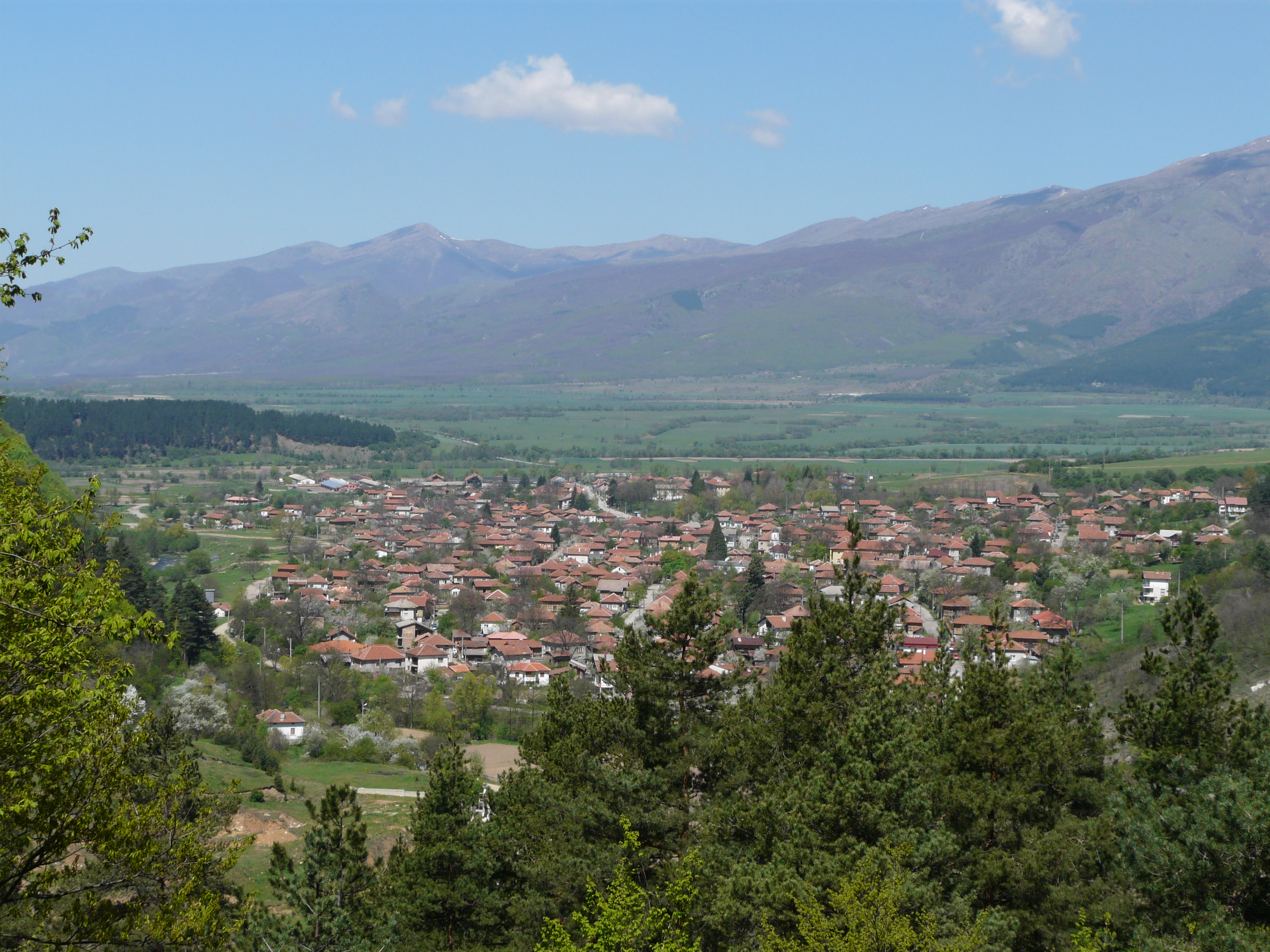
- The valley from the village of Dushantsi
- Interactive map of Zlatitsa–Pirdop Valley
- Coordinates: 42°42′3.6″N 24°9′47.52″E
- Location: Bulgaria

Area
  - Total: 120 km^{2} (46 sq mi)

Dimensions
  - Length: 36 km (22 mi)
  - Width: 8 km (5.0 mi)

Zlatitsa–Pirdop Valley (Bulgarian: Златишко-Пирдопска котловина) is situated in central western Bulgaria and is the fifth of the eleven Sub-Balkan valleys in direction west–east. It is named after the two towns that lie within, Zlatitsa and Pirdop. The valley is an important hub of the Bulgarian copper and gold mining and processing industry. It contains numerous natural and architectural landmarks, including the ruins of the late Roman Elenska Basilica.

== Geography ==
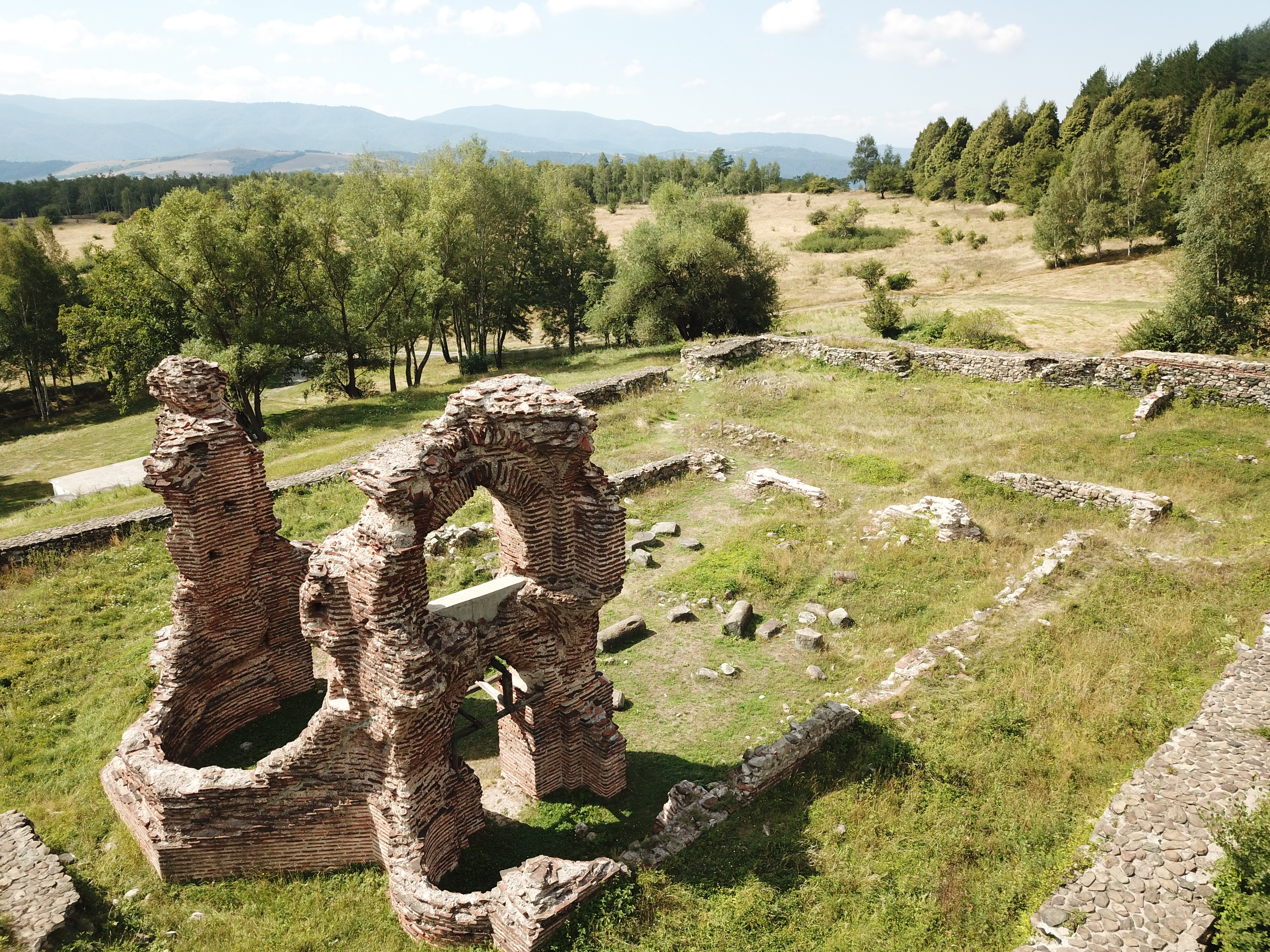
The ruins of the Elenska Basilica overlooking the valley

The valley is enclosed between the Etropole and Zlatitsa–Teteven divisions of the Balkan Mountains to the north and the Sredna Gora mountain range to the south and southwest. To the west the Galabets ridge (925 m) separates it from the Kamarska Valley and to the east the Koznitsa ridge (1,092 m) separates it from the Karlovo Valley.

The valley spans a territory of 120 km^{2}. It reaches a maximum length of 36 km from west to east; its width varies between 3 and 8 km. The average altitude is 750 m. Zlatitsa–Pirdop Valley is inclined in southern direction. In its middle rise two small heights, Gusenets (834 m) and Vesela Mogila, which divide it two parts — the western hilly Mirkovo area and the eastern flat Zlatitsa field.

The northern peripheral sections of the valley are filled with large alluvial fans. Zlatitsa–Pirdop Valley is a one-sided graben that sank several times during the Tertiary period. From the north it is bounded by the Sub-Balkan fault. Intra–basin depressions and sills, expressed morphologically on the terrain, were formed along transverse faults with a north–south direction. A powerful deluvial-proluvial plume was formed at the foothills of the Balkan Mountains. The valley's northern slopes on the Balkan Mountains are formed by Paleozoic and Upper Cretaceous rocks and are steep and deforested, while the southern slopes on Sredna Gora are mainly formed by granite and are covered with beech forests.

The valley is drained by the river Topolnitsa and its right tributaries the Bunovska, the Mirkovska, the Vozdol, the Mavdzharina, etc. On the course of the Topolnitsa in the eastern reaches of the valley is located the Dushantsi Reservoir. The Kazanite Waterfall is located on the Bunovska on the slopes of Sredna Gora facing the valley. The climate is continental with an annual precipitation of about 600 mm with a summer maximum. The soils are deluvial-proluvial and brown forest.

== Settlements, transportation and economy ==
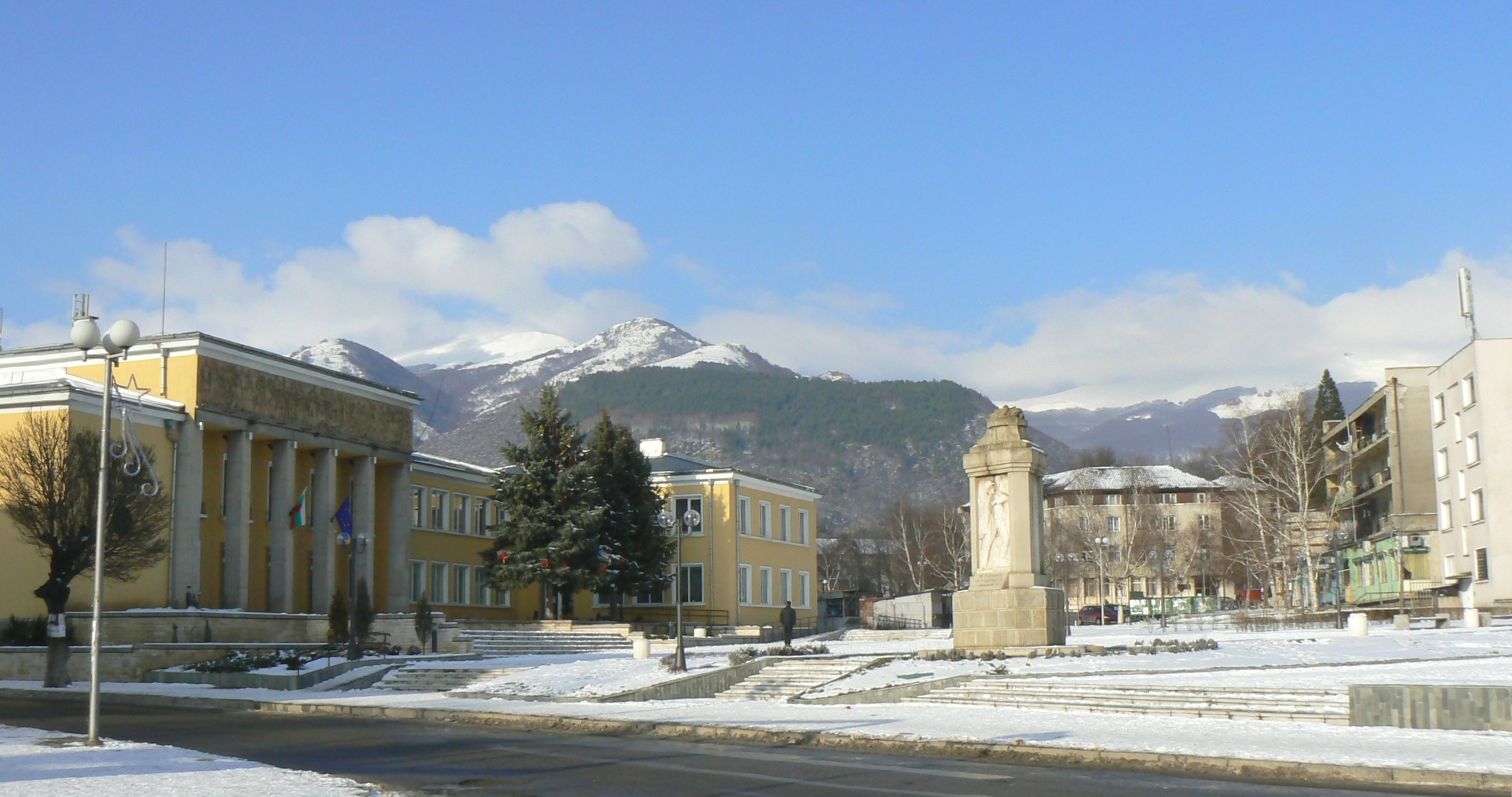
The town of Zlatitsa

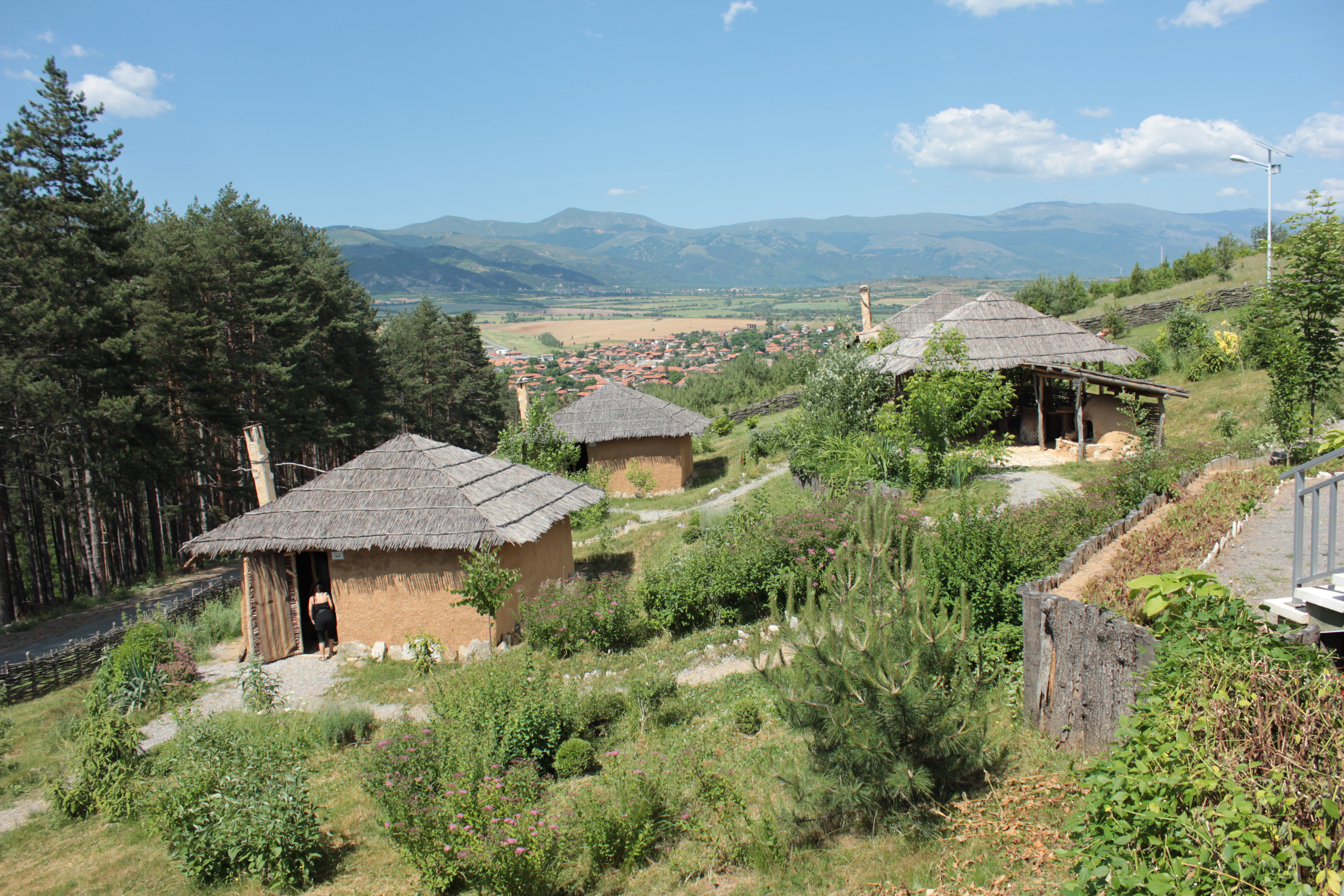
Neolithic houses reconstruction near Chavdar

Administratively, it falls in Sofia Province, on the territory of five municipalities — Anton, Chavdar, Chelopech, Mirkovo, Pirdop and Zlatitsa. There are two towns and eight villages. In the central parts are the towns of Zlatitsa and Pirdop and the villages of Chavdar, Chelopech and Tsarkvishte; to the west are the villages of Mirkovo, Bunovo and Benkovski; to the east are the villages of Anton and Dushantsi.

The valley is served by several roads of the national network, as well as local roads. From west to east, between the villages of Bunovo and Anton passes a 44.4 km stretch of the first class I-6 road Gyueshevo–Sofia–Karlovo–Burgas. In direction north–south the valley is traversed by a 6.4 km stretch of the second class II-37 road Yablanitsa–Panagyurishte–Pazardzhik–Dospat. A section of railway line No. 3 Iliyantsi (Sofia)–Karlovo–Sliven–Karnobat–Varna served by the Bulgarian State Railways crosses the valley in direction west–east between the two longest tunnels in Bulgaria, Koznitsa (5,808 m) and Galabets (3,034 m).

The economy is well developed. The municipalities in the Zlatitsa–Pirdop Valley are among the richest in Bulgaria due to copper and gold related industries — mining and non-ferrous metallurgy. Along the northern slopes of the valley are located two important mines, the underground Chelopech mine containing significant gold, silver and copper reserves, and the open-pit Elatsite mine located further north in the Balkan Mountains, containing large copper deposits and also gold. The Pirdop copper smelter and refinery in the valley is the biggest facility for smelting and refining of copper in Southeastern Europe and a leading European exporter of cathode copper. In the village of Mirkovo there is a copper processing mill, linked to the Elatsite mine via a 6.5 km underground rubber-belt conveyor line beneath of the Balkan Mountains.

In addition, the valley supports agriculture, the main crops being rye, potatoes, apples, etc. Significant areas are covered with meadows and pastures.

The tourist landmarks include the Elenska Basilica, a large partially preserved late Roman church dating to the 5th–6th century AD. The remains of a Neolithic settlement have been discovered at a mound near the Topolnitsa river in the vicinity of Chavdar.

== Sources ==
- Мичев (Michev), Николай (Nikolay); Михайлов (Mihaylov), Цветко (Tsvetko); Вапцаров (Vaptsarov), Иван (Ivan); Кираджиев (Kiradzhiev), Светлин (Svetlin) (1980). Географски речник на България [Geographic Dictionary of Bulgaria] (in Bulgarian). София (Sofia): Наука и култура (Nauka i kultura).
- Дончев (Donchev), Дончо (Doncho); Каракашев (Karakashev), Христо (Hristo) (2004). Теми по физическа и социално-икономическа география на България (Topics on Physical and Social-Economic Geography of Bulgaria) (in Bulgarian). София (Sofia): Ciela. ISBN 954-649-717-7.
