= Pirdop Apostle =

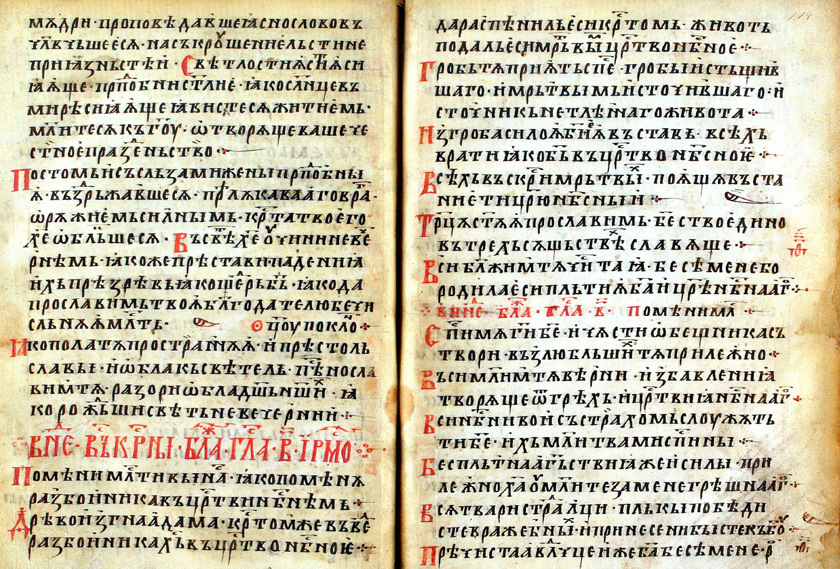
Pirdop Apostle

The Pirdop Apostle is a Bulgarian script book in Bulgarian language from Elena Basilica scriptorium near Pirdop, now kept in the SS. Cyril and Methodius National Library (No. 497). It consists of the Acts of the Apostles with 130 surviving parchment leaves, the beginning and end parts being lost. It initially contained all the texts of the Acts and the Letters of the Apostles, but now only the Letters are preserved. It dates from the 13th century. In the 19th century the book was discovered immured in a niche of the church known as the "Elena Basilica" of "St. Elijah" monastery near to the small Bulgarian town of Pirdop. The Monastery and church was looted and completely destroyed by the Ottoman Army in 1700. According to a palaeographic analysis of the preserved transcript, this is a late counterfeit, probably from the first half of the 19th century.
