= Anton, Sofia Province =

Anton Антон
- Location of Anton
- Coordinates: 42°45′N 24°17′E
- Country: Bulgaria
- Province (Oblast): Sofia

Government
  - Mayor: Stoyan Garchev
- Elevation: 807 m (2,648 ft)

Population (2008)
  - Total: 1,631
- Time zone: UTC+2 (EET)
  - Summer (DST): UTC+3 (EEST)
- Postal Code: 2089
- Area code: 07186

Anton (Bulgarian: Антон, pronounced [ɐnˈtɔn]) is a village in western Bulgaria, part of Sofia Province. It is the administrative centre of Anton Municipality, which lies in the easternmost part of Sofia Province. Anton is situated in the Zlatitsa–Pirdop Valley, 80 kilometres east of the capital Sofia. The village is the only place in the eponymous municipality, which has an area of 76 square kilometres and includes the Vartopa area, part of the Central Balkan National Park. Anton's old name was Ladzhene (Лъджене).

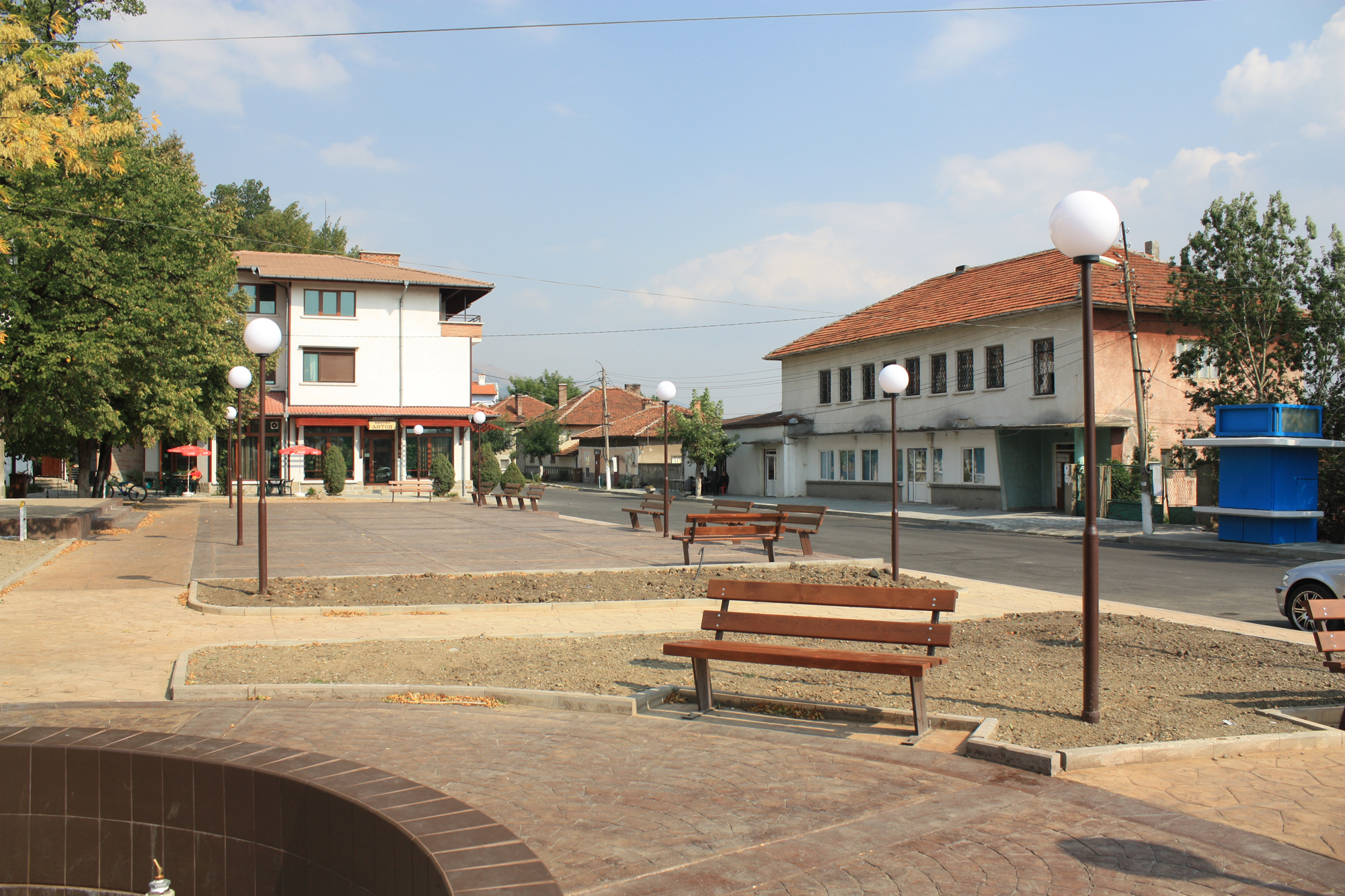
The central square in Anton village

A notable sight in the area is the Elenska Basilica, a partially preserved imposing Late Roman or early Byzantine (5th-6th century) Christian basilica.

== Demography ==
=== Ethnicity ===
According to the 2011 Bulgarian census, 87.99% of the population of Anton are Bulgarians, 2.31% are Gypsies, 0.18% are Turks and 0.5% were others. Some 9% of the population did not declare their ethnicity.

Anton is one of the few settlements in Bulgaria where the Aromanians live. The Aromanian minority of this country is small, composed of around 2,000 to 3,000 people nationwide.

=== Religion ===
According to the latest Bulgarian census of 2011, the religious composition, among those who answered the optional question on religious identification, was the following:

Religious composition of Anton Municipality
Orthodox Christianity	81.1%
Catholicism	0.0%
Protestantism	0.0%
Islam	0.3%
No religion	2.1%
Prefer not to answer, others and indefinable	16.5%
