= Zlatitsa =

Zlatitsa Златица
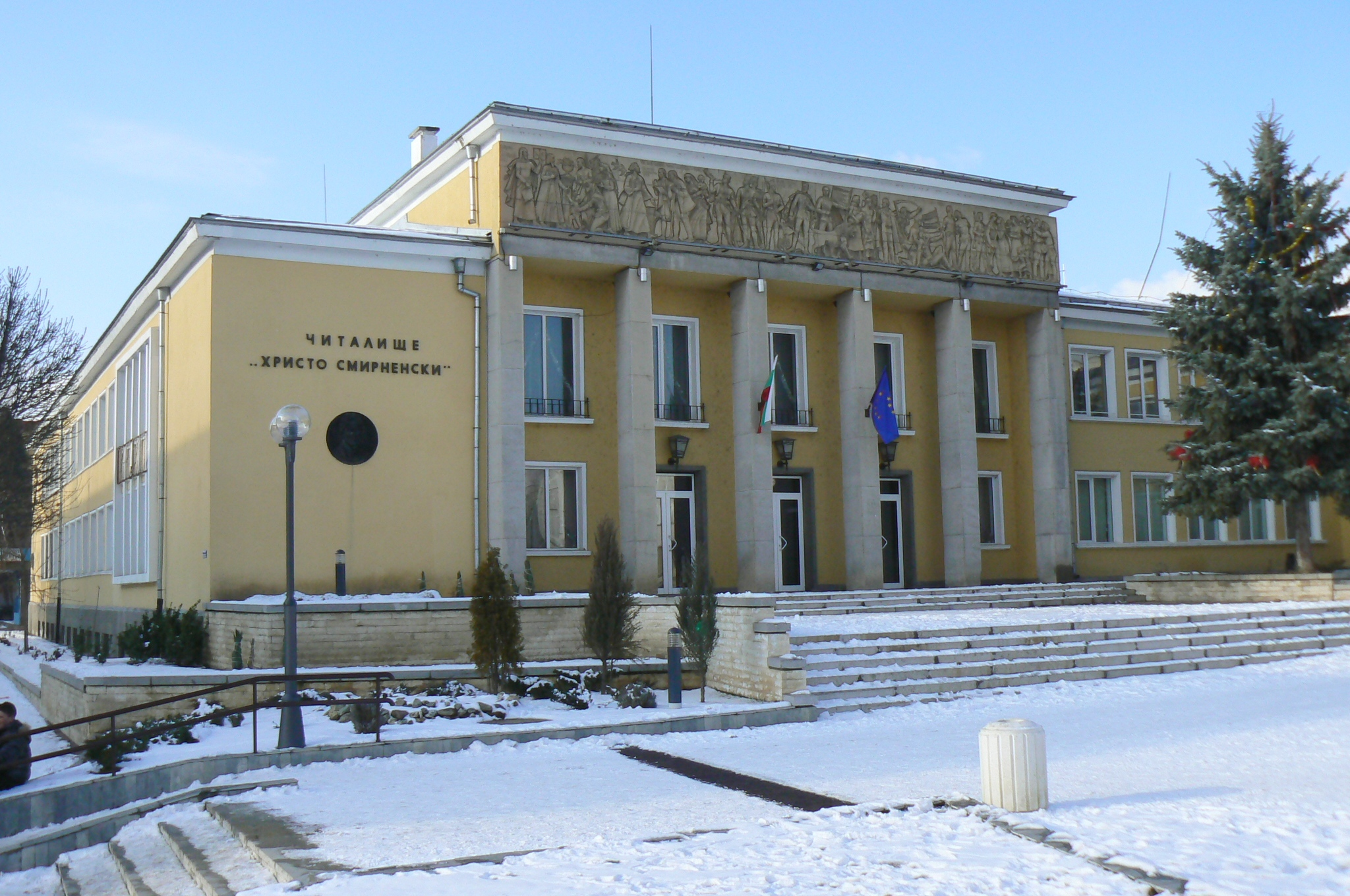
- Chitalishte Hristo Smirnenski

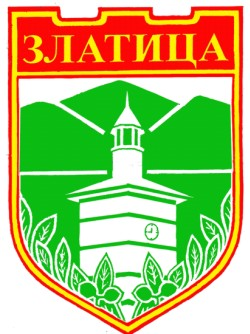
- Coat of arms

- Location of Zlatitsa
- Coordinates: 42°43′N 24°08′E
- Country: Bulgaria
- Provinces (Oblast): Sofia

Government
  - Mayor: Georgi Gerginekov
- Elevation: 680 m (2,230 ft)

Population (2024)
  - Total: 4 419
- Time zone: UTC+2 (EET)
  - Summer (DST): UTC+3 (EEST)
- Postal Code: 2080
- Area code: 0728

Zlatitsa (Bulgarian: Златица [zɫɐˈtit͡sɐ]) is a town in Sofia Province, of central-western Bulgaria. It has a population of 4,419.

== Geography ==
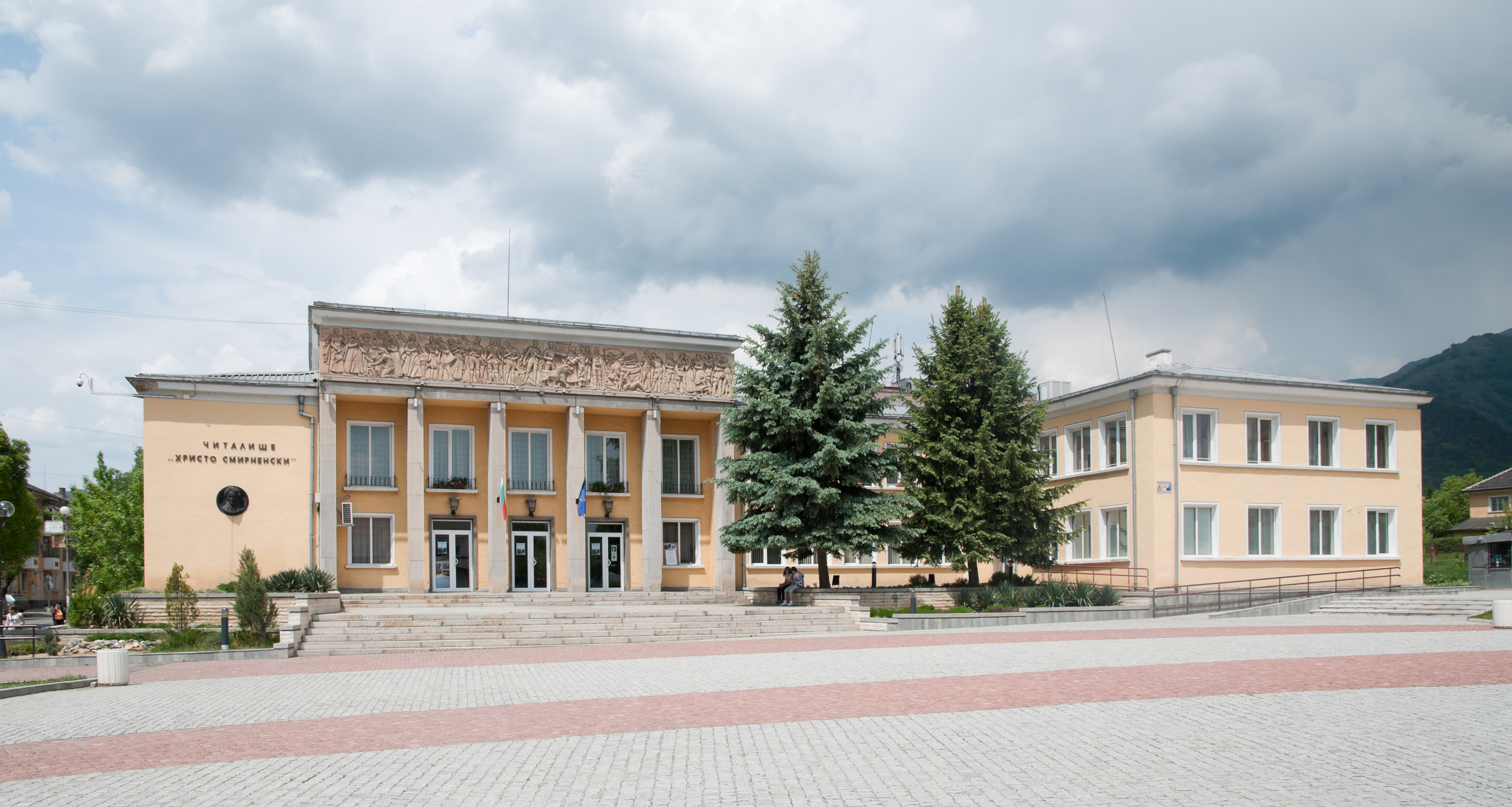
The central square with the chitalishte

The town is situated in the Zlatitsa–Pirdop Valley, the highest of the eleven Sub-Balkan valleys. It lies between Zlatitsa–Teteven division of the Balkan Mountains to the north and Sredna Gora to the south, at 680 m above sea level. Several small tributaries of the river Topolnitsa run through Zlatitsa.

The settlement falls within the temperate continental climatic zone with cold influence from the Danubian Plain penetrating through the Zlatitsa Pass from the north and subtropical influence from the Topolnitsa valley from the south. The average annual temperature is 9.4 °C. The annual precipitation reaches 590 mm, with a maximum in June (97 mm) and a minimum in February (26 mm). Snow cover lasts for about 48 days. The soils are cinnamon forest soils.

Administratively, the town is the seat of the Zlatitsa Municipality, located in the eastern part of Sofia Province. It lies 75 km east of the capital Sofia, 27 km south of Etropole, 32 km north of Panagyurishte, 2 km west of Pirdop, and 32 km northwest of Koprivshtitsa.

Zlatitsa is situated at the crossroad between the first class I-6 road Gyueshevo–Sofia–Karlovo–Burgas and the second class II-37 road Yablanitsa–Panagyurishte–Pazardzhik–Dospat. It is also served by railway line No. 3 Iliyantsi (Sofia)–Karlovo–Sliven–Karnobat–Varna operated by the Bulgarian State Railways.

== History ==
The name of Zlatitsa was first mentioned in the Virgino Charter of the Bulgarian emperor Constantine I Tih (r. 1257–1277). In the late 14th or early 15th century the settlement was conquered by the Ottomans during the Bulgarian–Ottoman wars. During the Crusade of Varna the Battle of Zlatitsa was fought in the nearby mountain pass on 12 December 1443, in which the Ottomans defeated a Christian army.

During the Bulgarian National Revival of the 19th century Zlatitsa was a thriving settlement. After the Liberation of Bulgaria in 1878 the town was a center of a district. After a violent rally against the government of Stefan Stambolov in the autumn of 1888, the district administration was moved to the neighbouring Pirdop along with all the related services. Following the Second World War and the establishment of the People's Republic of Bulgaria the area emerged as an important industrial center. Between 1 April 1978 and 31 August 1991, Zlatitsa together with Pirdop formed a single town called Srednogorie.

== Economy ==
The backbone of the local economy is the non-ferrous metallurgy. The Pirdop copper smelter and refinery is situated between Zlatitsa and Pirdop, within the borders of both municipalities. It is the biggest facility for smelting and refining of copper in Southeastern Europe and a leading European exporter of cathode copper. There are also workshops for diary processing. The most important agricultural crops are potatoes and cereals.

== Landmarks ==
There are numerous landmarks in Zlatitsa. The Church of St George was constructed in 1859 and contains valuable icons and iconostasis. There is a nunnery in which the 19th century revolutionary and national hero Vasil Levski had stayed. The local clock tower was constructed in 1777. There are several historical houses and small chapels. The local cultural center, called a chitalishte in Bulgarian, is located in a neoclassical edifice built in 1964.

== Gallery ==
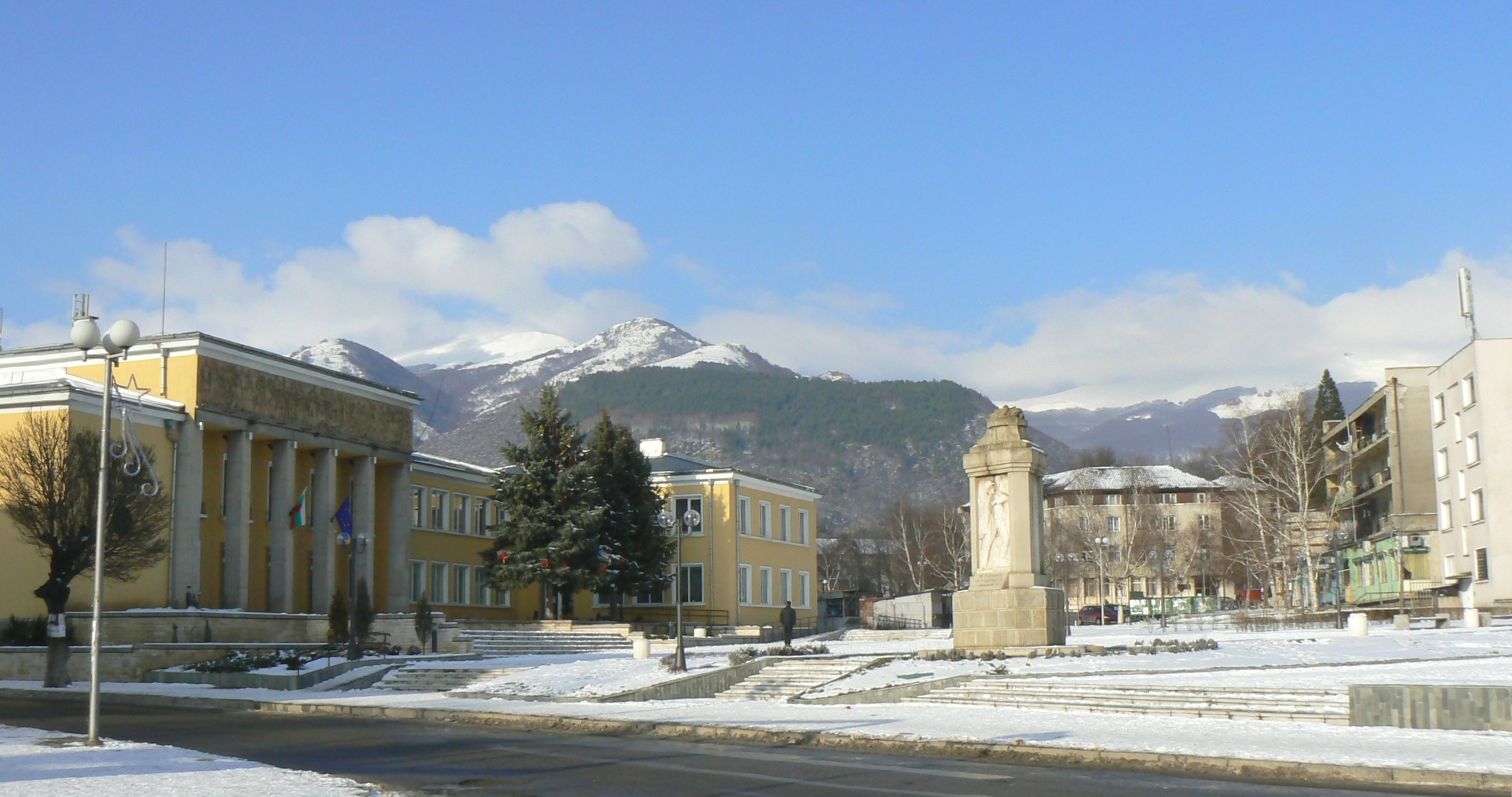
The central square

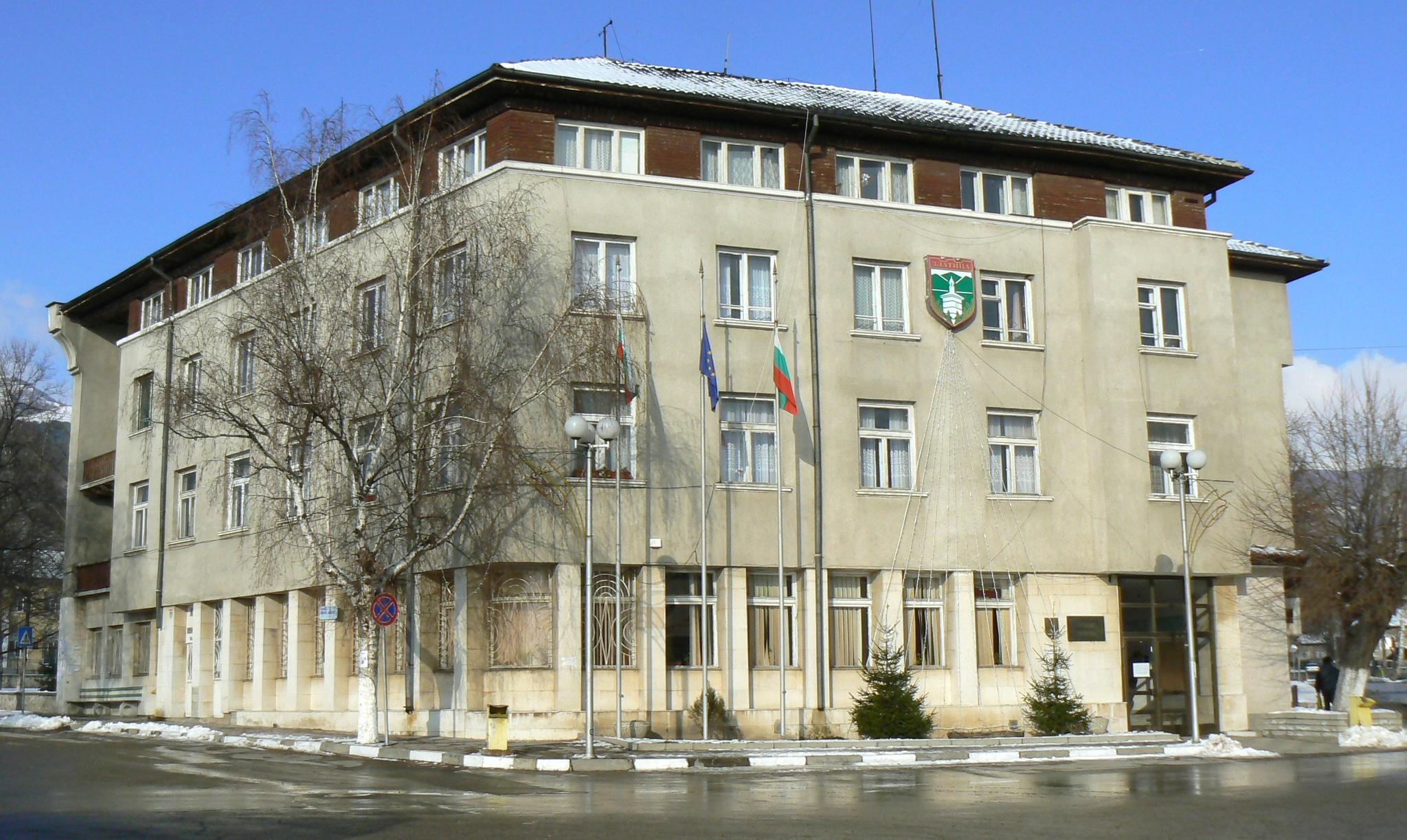
The town hall

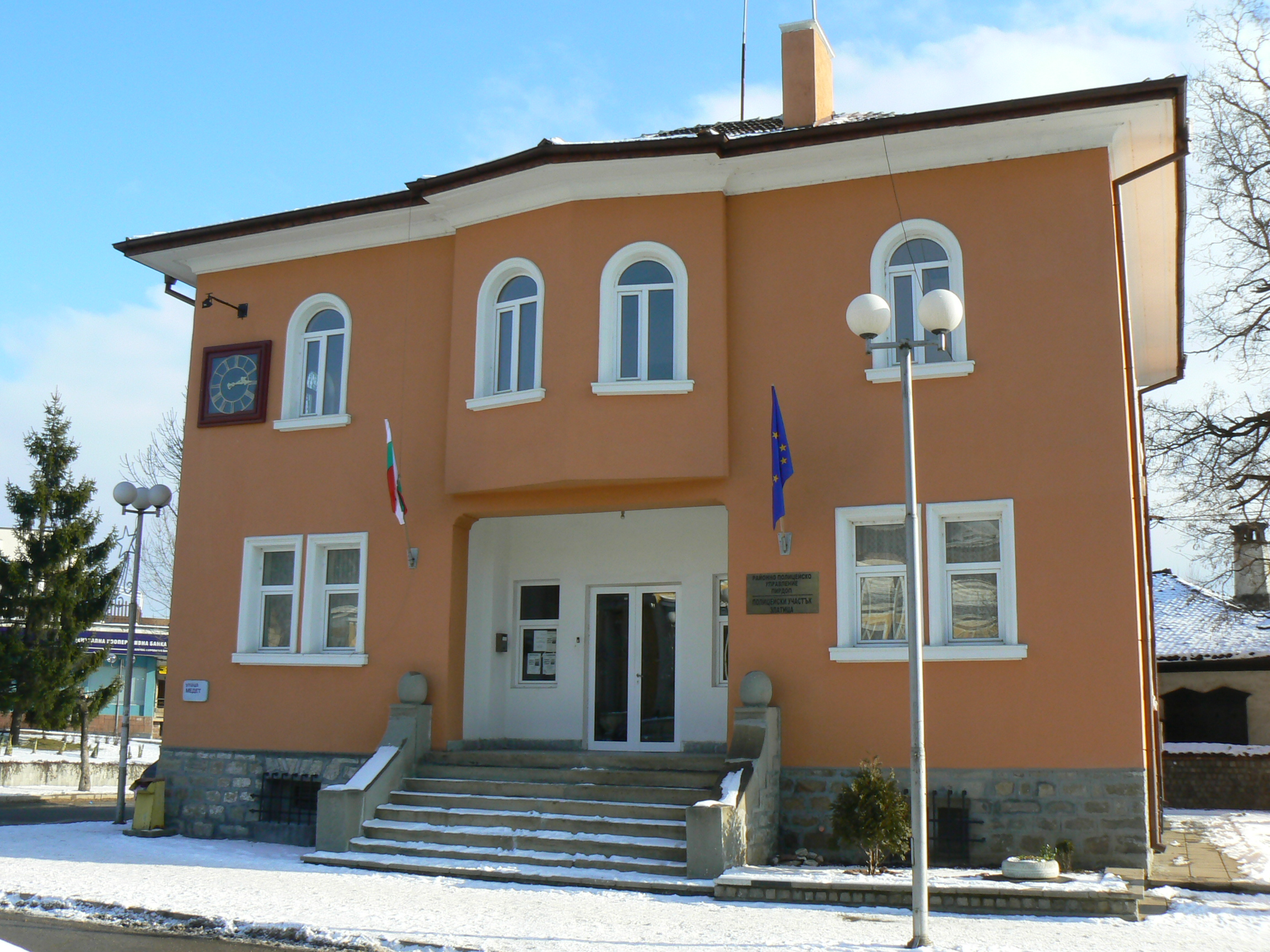
The police station

== Notable people ==
- Valko Chervenkov, Bulgarian leader of the Communist Party and politician
