= Anton Municipality =

Coordinates: 42°44′7″N 24°15′36″E

HelloKieranBloxFruitsSobad Община Антон
- Municipality
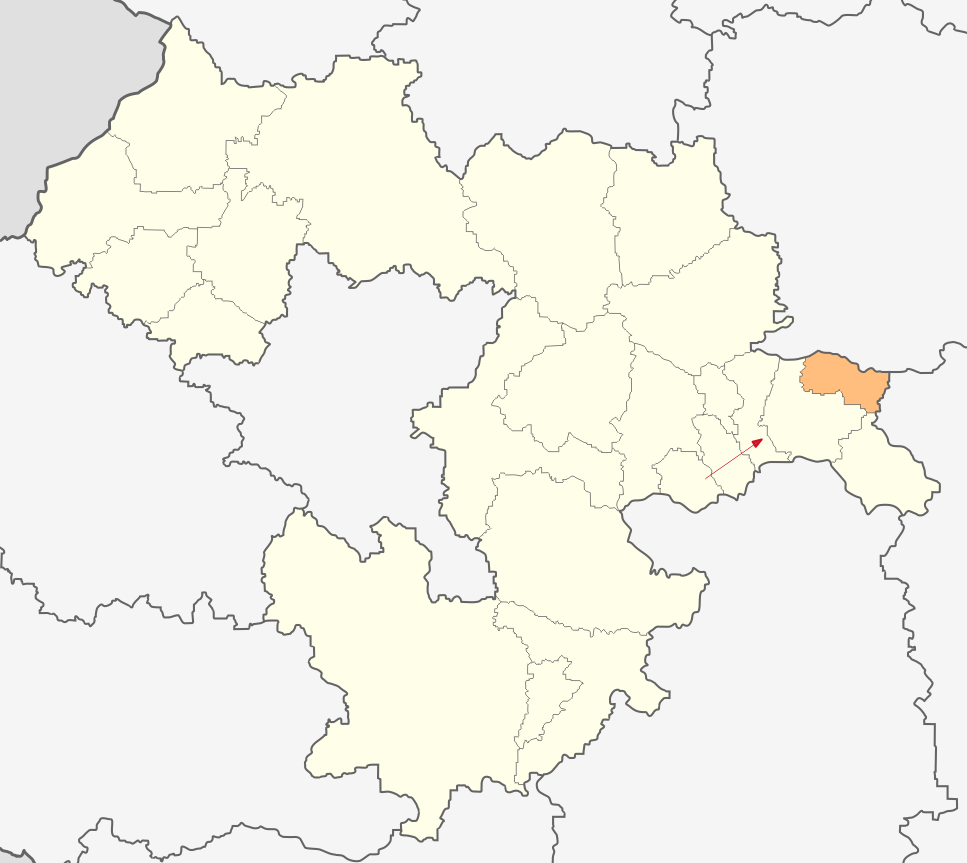
- Country: Bulgaria
- Province: Sofia Province
- Seat: Anton

Anton Municipality is located in Sofia Province, Bulgaria. The administrative centre is in Anton, Bulgaria.

== Demography ==
=== Religion ===
According to the latest Bulgarian census of 2011, the religious composition, among those who answered the optional question on religious identification, was the following:

Religious composition of Anton Municipality
| Orthodox Christianity | 81.1% |
| Catholicism | 0.0% |
| Protestantism | 0.0% |
| Islam | 0.3% |
| No religion | 2.1% |
| Prefer not to answer, others and indefinable | 16.5% |
