= Zlatitsa Municipality =

Zlatitsa Municipality Община Златица
- Municipality (Obshtina)
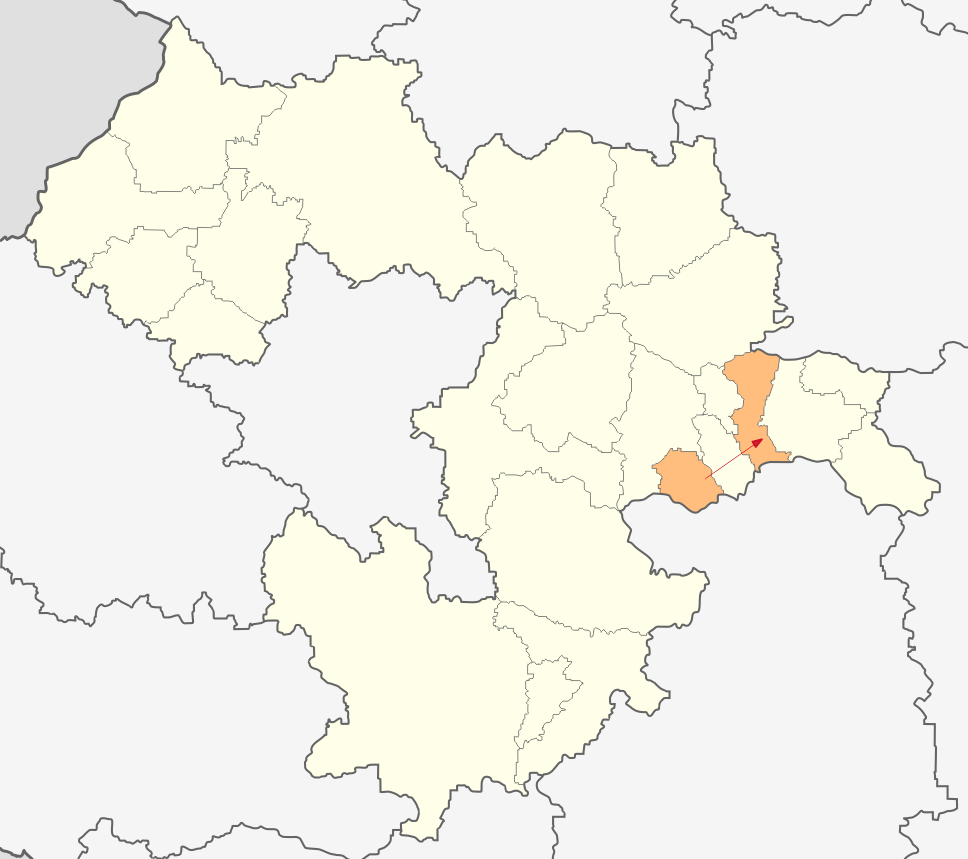
- Location within Sofia Province
- Coordinates: 42.717°N 24.133°E
- Country: Bulgaria
- Province (Oblast): Sofia Province
- Seat: Zlatitsa

Population (2019)
  - Total: 5,077
- Time zone: UTC+2 (EET)
  - Summer (DST): UTC+3 (EEST)
- Website: zlatitsa.egov.bg

The municipality of Zlatitsa (Bulgarian: Община Златица [opʃtiˈna zɫɐˈtit͡sɐ]) is a municipality in Sofia Province, Bulgaria. It is made up of two disjoint areas: one consisting of the territory of the town of Zlatitsa and the neighbouring village of Karlievo, and another one centred on the village of Petrich to the south-west, which is separated by the territory of the intervening Chavdar Municipality. The municipality has a population of 5,077 (according to a 2019 estimate).
