= Dushantsi Reservoir =

Reservoir in Bulgaria

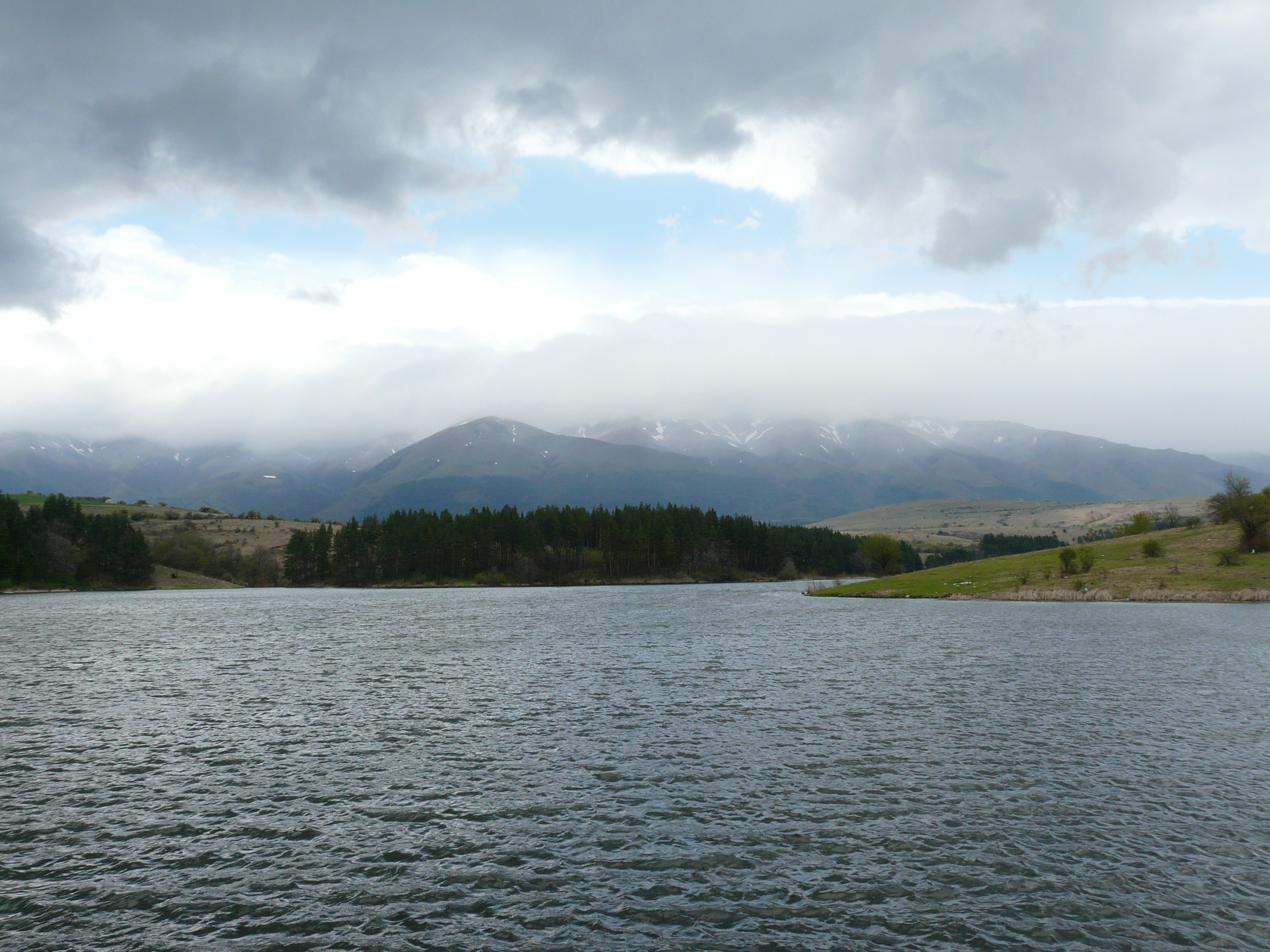

- Location within Bulgaria
- Location: Zlatitsa–Pirdop Valley
- Coordinates: 42°41′48″N 24°17′13″E
- Type: dam
- Primary outflows: Topolnitsa river
- Basin countries: Bulgaria
- Water volume: 13 hm^{3} (460,000,000 cu ft)

The Dushantsi Reservoir (Bulgarian: Язовир Душанци) is a dam reservoir in Bulgaria. It is located in the Zlatitsa–Pirdop Valley between the Balkan Mountains to the north and Sredna Gora mountain range to the south. It is situated in western-central Bulgaria in Sofia Province. The reservoir is fed by the river Topolnitsa.

The dam wall can be easily reached by car, via the first class I-6 road Gyueshevo–Sofia–Karlovo–Burgas. The area around the reservoir is used for outings, picnics, water sports and fishing.
