= Pirdop =

Pirdop Пирдоп
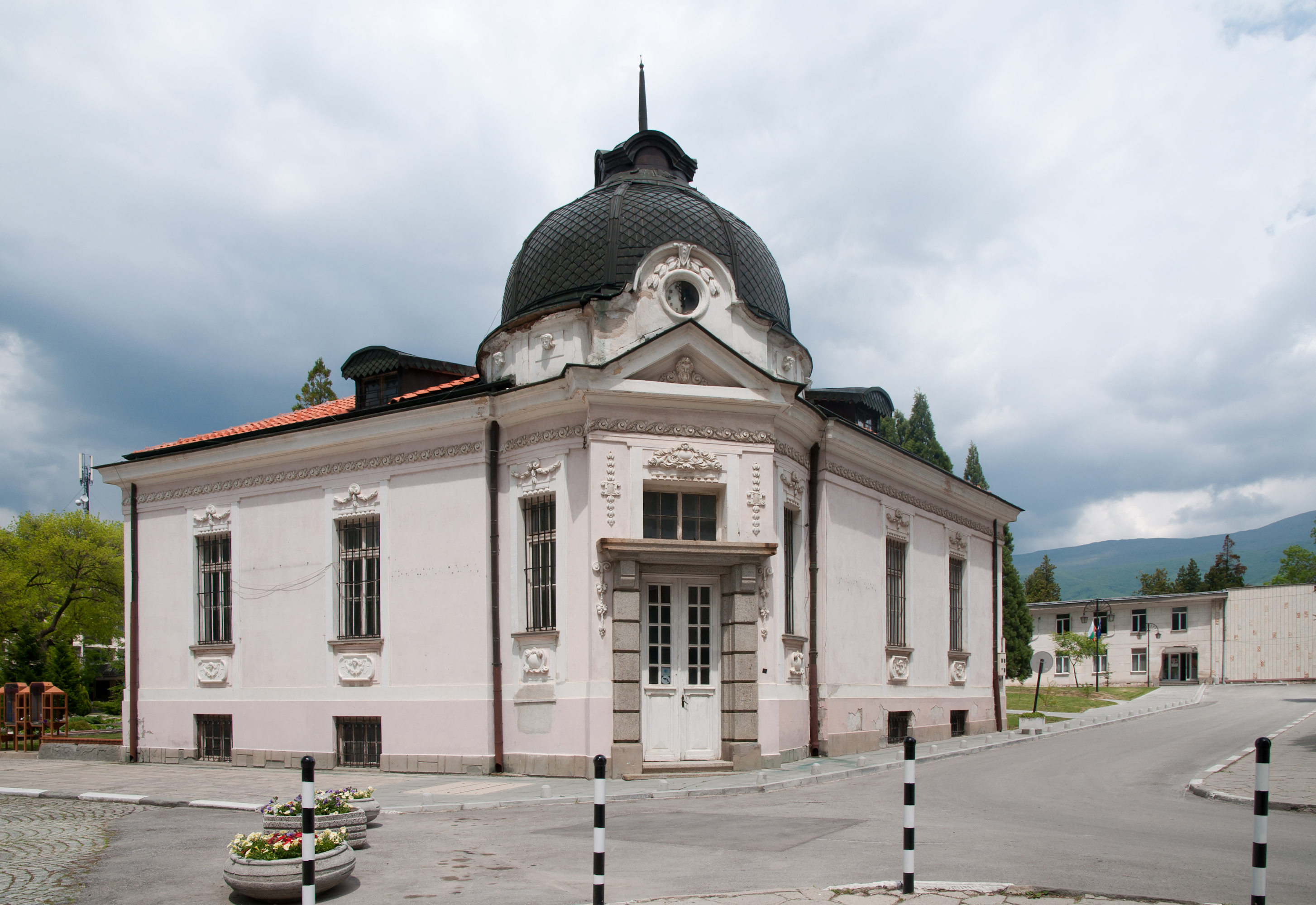
- A bank building in Pirdop

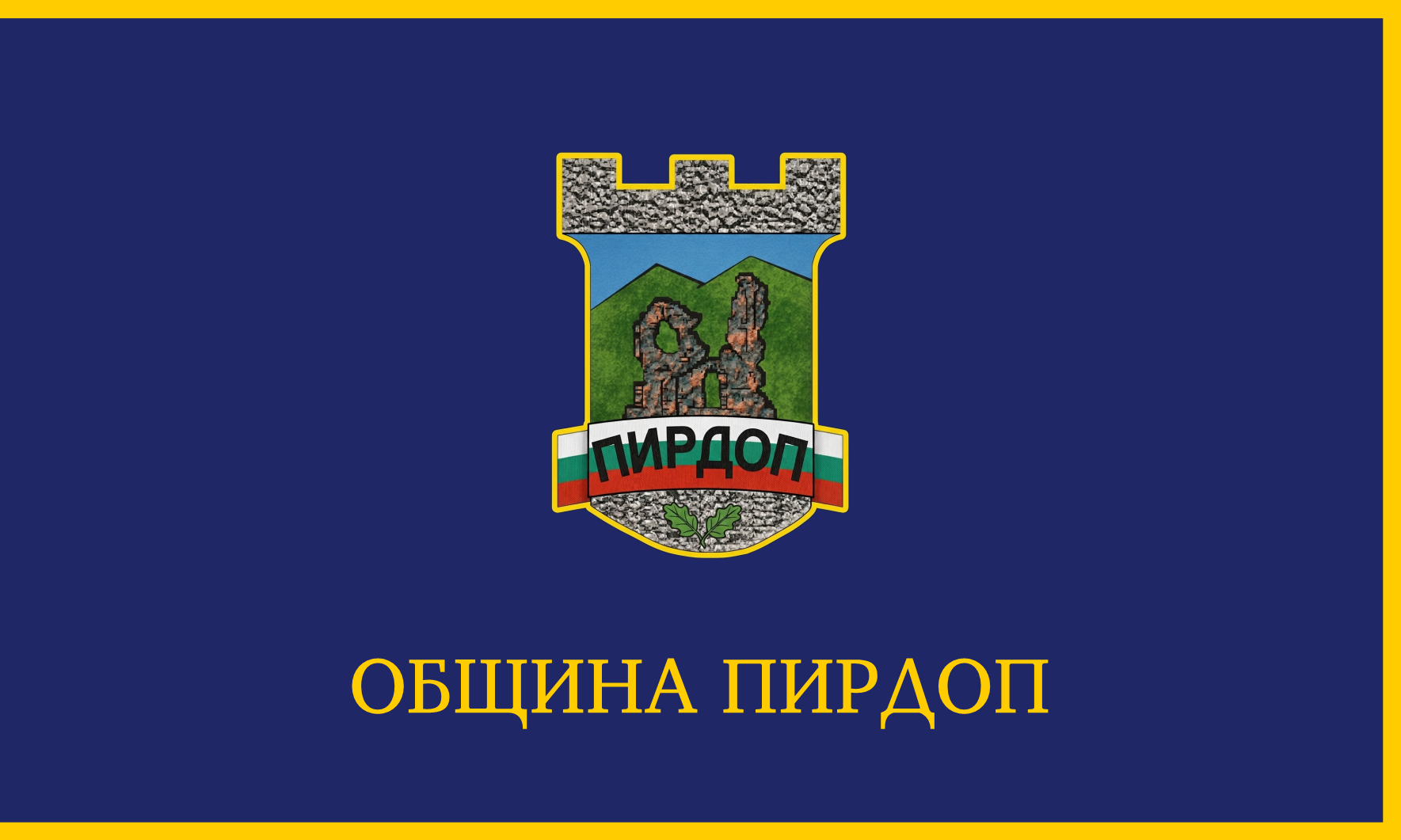
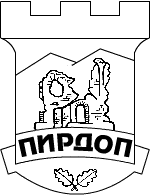
- Flag Coat of arms

- Location of Pirdop
- Coordinates: 42°42′N 24°11′E
- Country: Bulgaria
- Provinces (Oblast): Sofia

Government
  - Mayor: Angel Gerov
- Elevation: 696 m (2,283 ft)

Population (2024)
  - Total: 6 611
- Time zone: UTC+2 (EET)
  - Summer (DST): UTC+3 (EEST)
- Postal Code: 2070
- Area code: 07181

Pirdop (Bulgarian: Пирдоп [pirˈdɔp]) is a town located in central-west Bulgaria. As of 2024, it had a population of 6,739. Pirdop Gate on Livingston Island in the South Shetland Islands, Antarctica is named after Pirdop.

== Geography ==
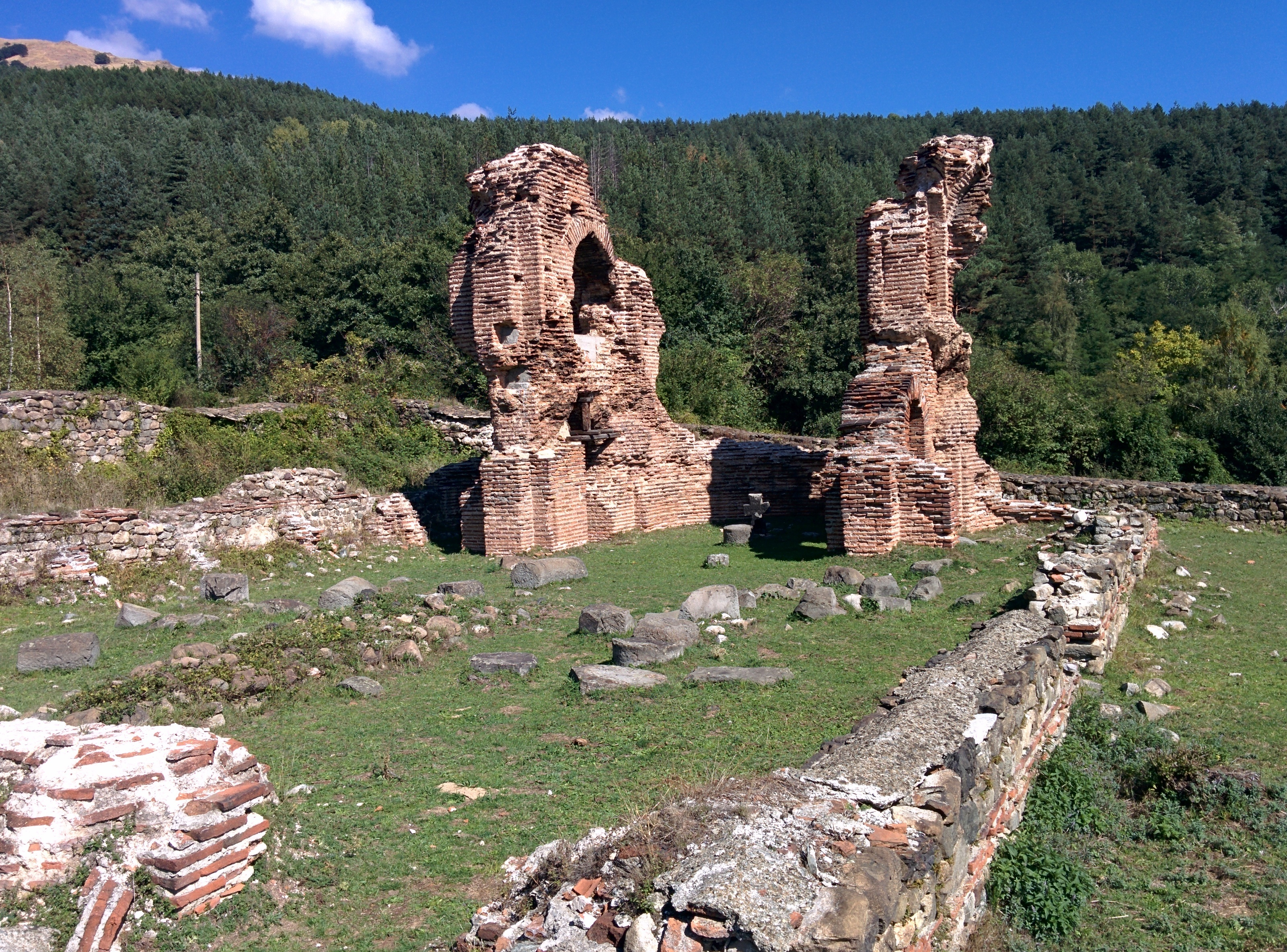
The ruins of the early medieval Elenska Basilica

The town is situated in the Zlatitsa–Pirdop Valley, the highest of the eleven Sub-Balkan valleys at an altitude of 670 m. It is surrounded by the Balkan Mountains to the north, the Sredna Gora mountain range to the south, and Koznitsa and Galabets saddles to the east and west, respectively. Several small tributaries of the river Topolnitsa run through the town.

Pirdop falls within the temperate continental climatic zone with cold influence from the Danubian Plain penetrating through the Zlatitsa Pass from the north and subtropical influence from the Topolnitsa valley from the south. The average annual temperature is 9.4 °C. The annual precipitation reaches 590 mm, with a maximum in June (97 mm) and a minimum in February (26 mm). Snow cover lasts for about 48 days. The soils are cinnamon forest soils.

Administratively, the town is the seat of the Pirdop Municipality, located in the eastern part of Sofia Province. Pirdop is served by the first class I-6 road Gyueshevo–Sofia–Karlovo–Burgas and railway line No. 3 Iliyantsi (Sofia)–Karlovo–Sliven–Karnobat–Varna operated by the Bulgarian State Railways.

== History ==
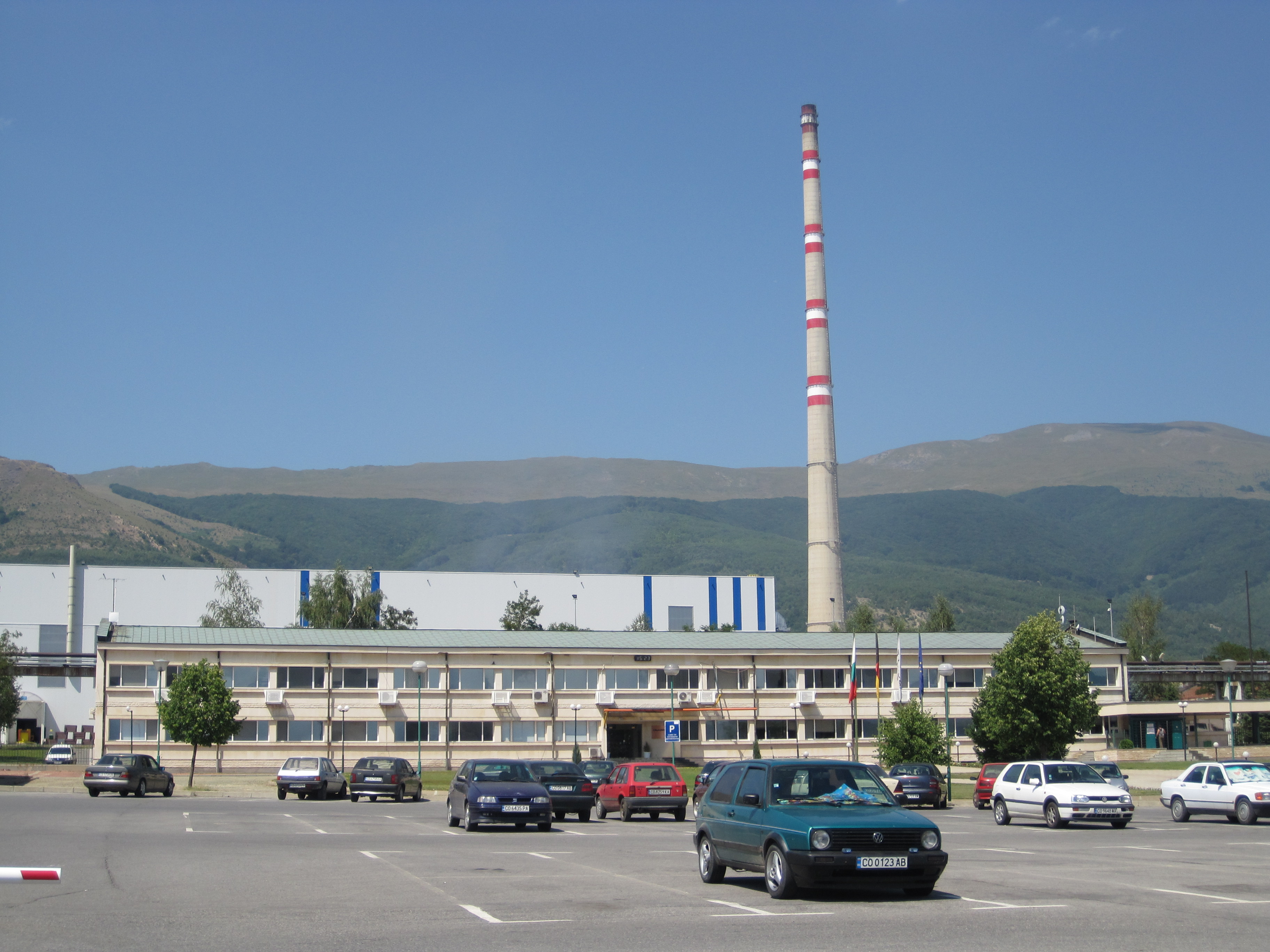
A partial view of the Pirdop copper smelter and refinery

The area of Pirdop was populated since Antiquity by the Thracians. It was later conquered by the Romans and eventually became part of the Byzantine Empire. From that period dates the nearby Elenska Basilica, constructed in the late 5th or early 6th century during the reign of emperor Justinian I. In the Middle Ages it became part of the First and Second Bulgarian Empire. The medieval Bulgarian Pirdop Apostle was discovered in a monastery near the town. It was eventually conquered by the Ottomans during the Bulgarian–Ottoman wars in the 14th century. The settlement was mentioned in Ottoman registers of 1430 as Protopopintsi. The name Pirdop was attested for the first time in 1727 in a book in the Glozhene Monastery.

During the Bulgarian National Revival in the 19th century Pirdop became a major economic center. Over 700 workshops produced braid; other local crafts included carpet weaving, cloth making, shoe-making, and goldsmithing. In economic terms, it competed with important centers of the Bulgarian lands as Gabrovo, Karlovo, Kalofer, Kotel, etc. In 1870, during the struggle for national liberation, the Vasil Levski founded a revolutionary committee in Pirdop. After the Liberation of Bulgaria in 1878, the town was among the few to have four representatives in the Constituent National Assembly. In the period between 1 April 1978 and 31 August 1991 Pirdop was merged with the neighbouring Zlatitsa to form a single town called Srednogorie.

== Economy ==
The main economic activity is non-ferrous metallurgy. The Pirdop copper smelter and refinery is the biggest in the Balkans and whole of Southeastern Europe. It was privatized in 1997 for $80,000,000 and is owned by the German Aurubis. It has a capacity of about 300,000 tons refined copper. The factory also produces 830,000 tons of sulphuric acid and employs about 1,000 workers. The main chimney of the factory is 325 metres tall and shares together with the chimneys of Maritza East Power Stations the title of tallest man-made objects of Bulgaria.

== Gallery ==
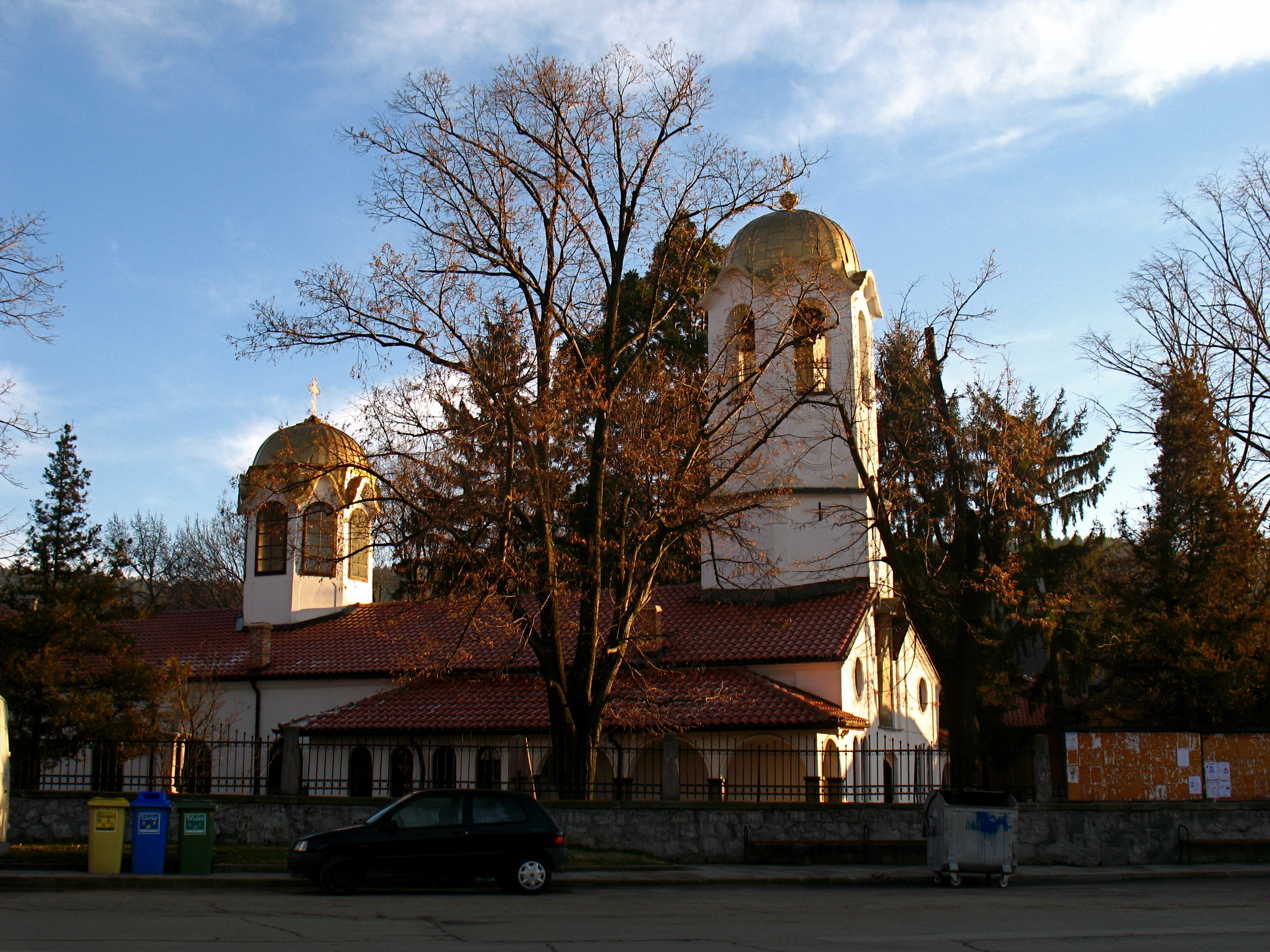
Church of the Assumption

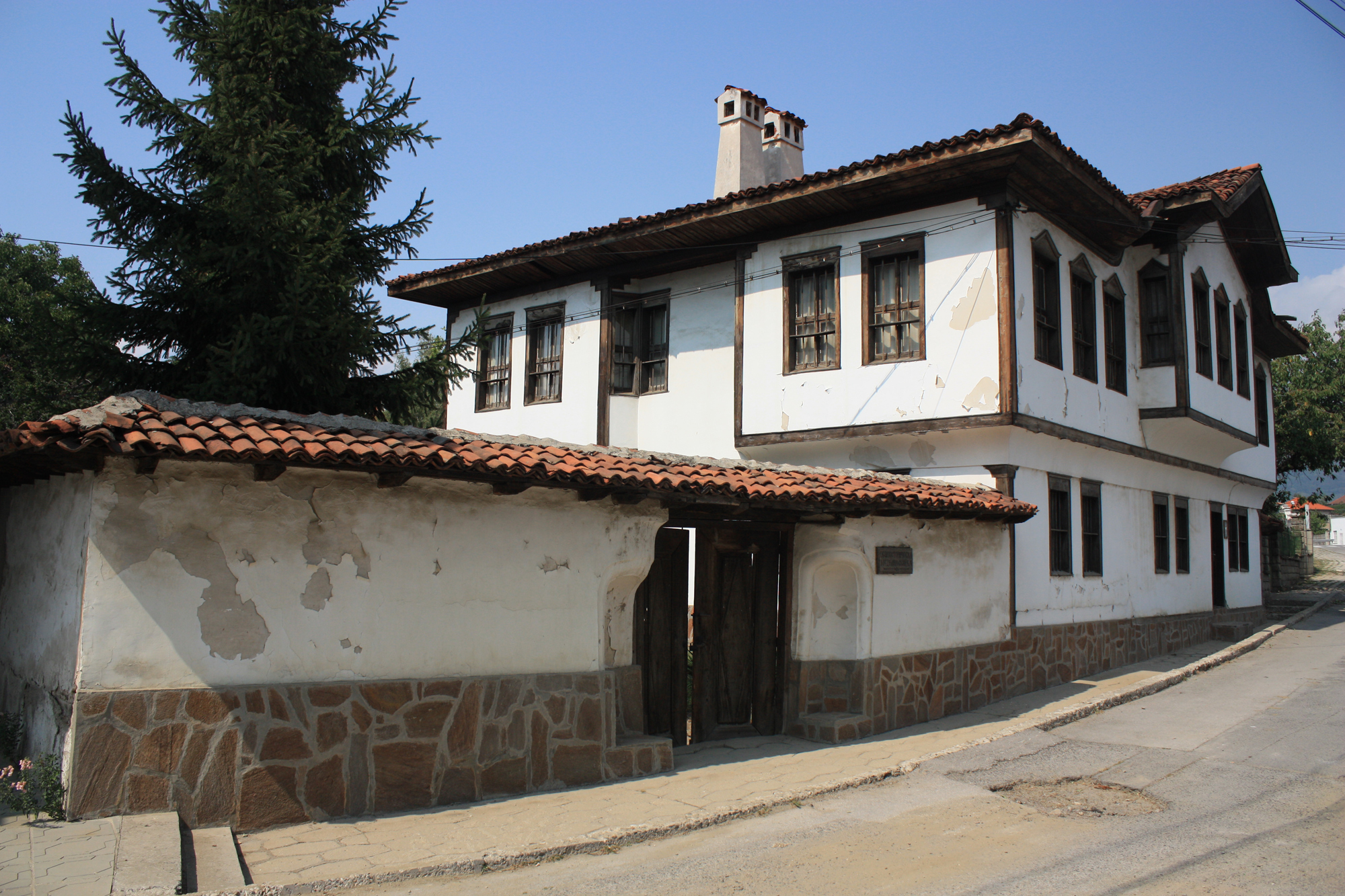
Museum of history

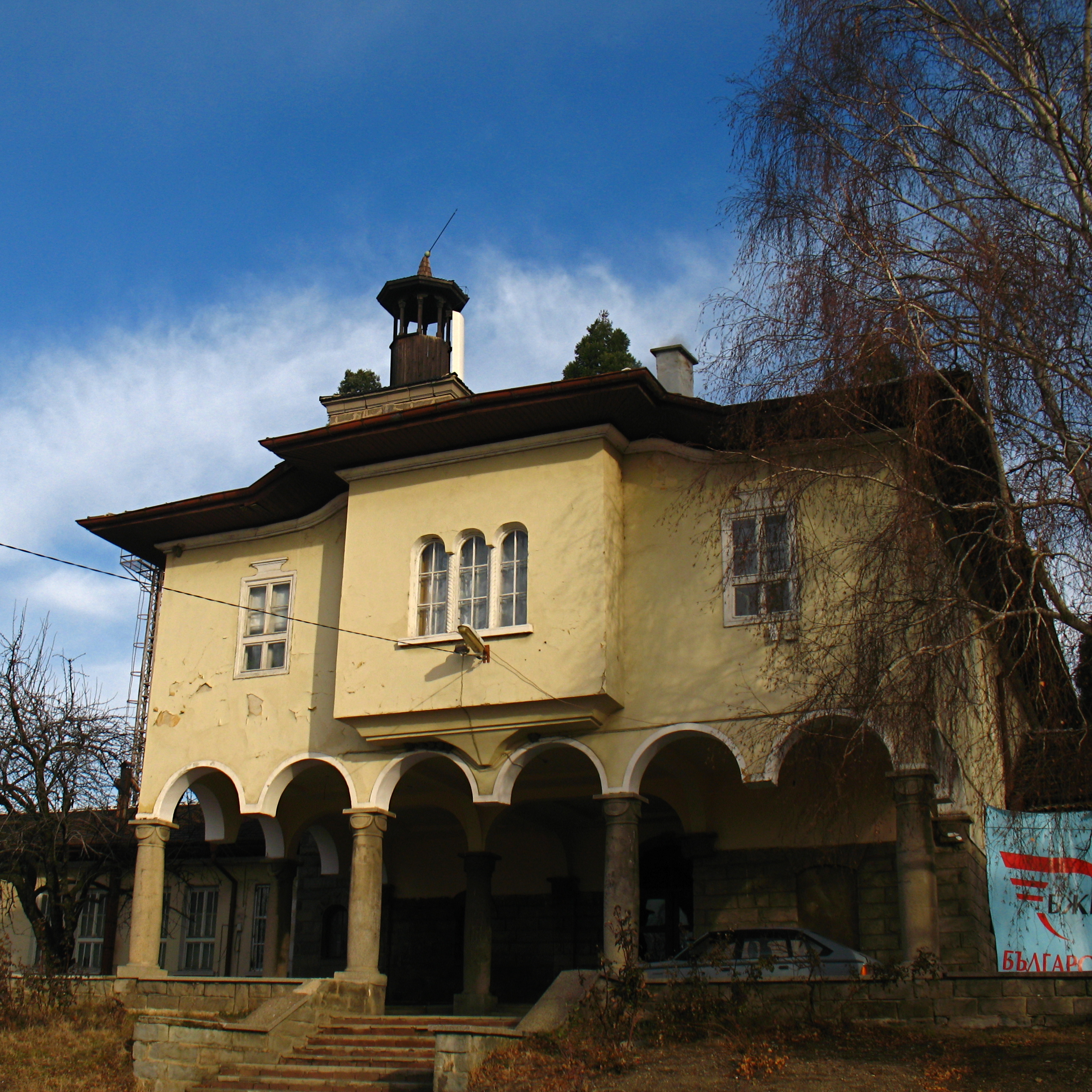
The railway station
