= Elenska Basilica =

Basilica in Bulgaria

Coordinates: 42°43′56.95″N 24°13′14.25″E

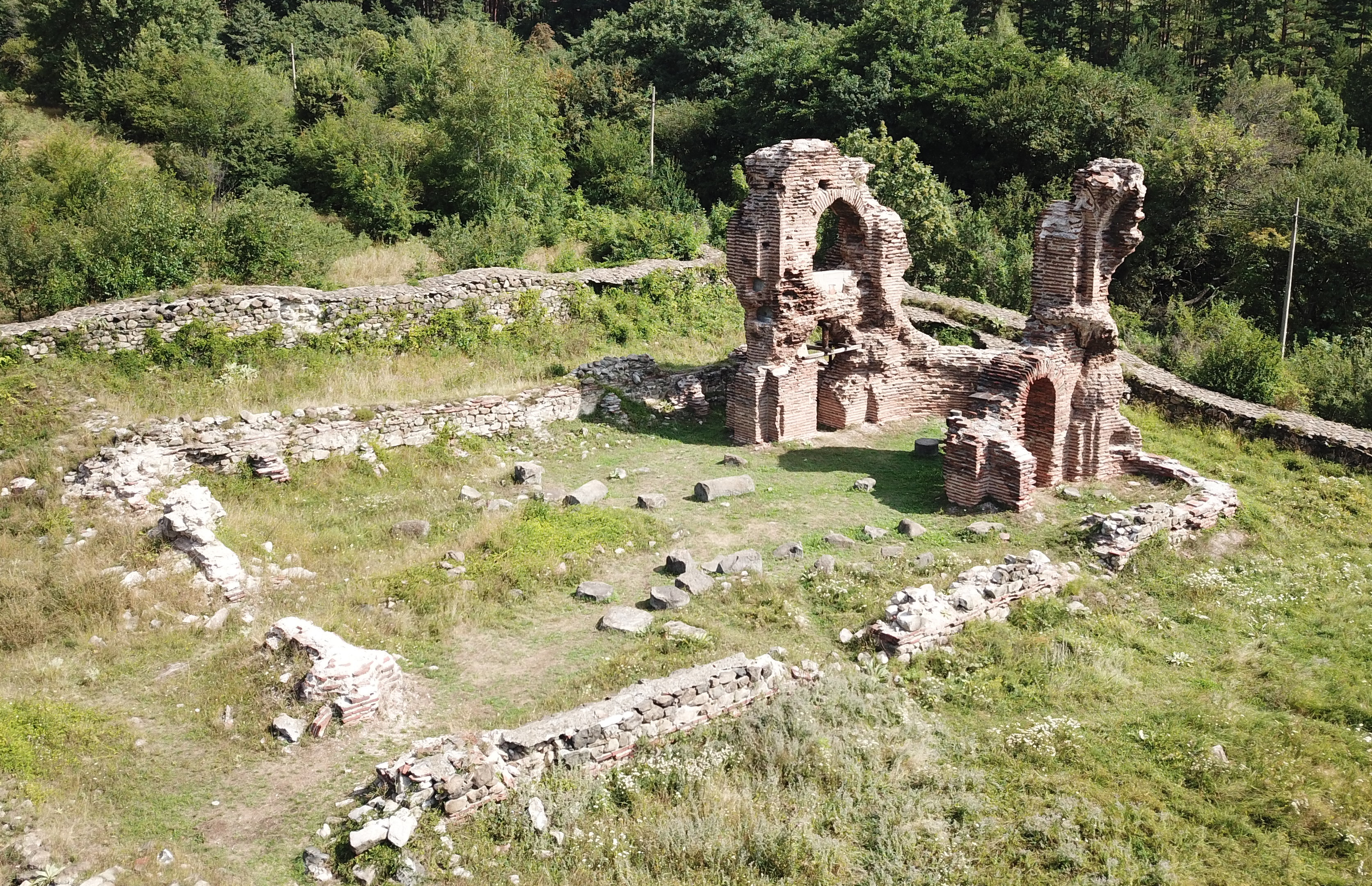
The Elenska Basilica

The Elenska Basilica or Elensko Basilica (Bulgarian: Еленска базилика, Elenska bazilika) is a large partially preserved late Roman (early Byzantine) Christian basilica in west central Bulgaria. Dating to the 5th–6th century AD, it lies 5 to 6 kilometres (3.1 to 3.7 mi) northeast of Pirdop and 3 kilometres (1.9 mi) from Anton, on the right bank of the Elenska River (Еленска река, Elenska reka) in the Zlatitsa–Pirdop Valley. The initially domeless basilica, which features thick walls and defensive towers, had a dome added in the mid-6th century, during the reign of Justinian I. The church was ruined in the early 18th century, during the Ottoman rule of Bulgaria.

== Architecture ==
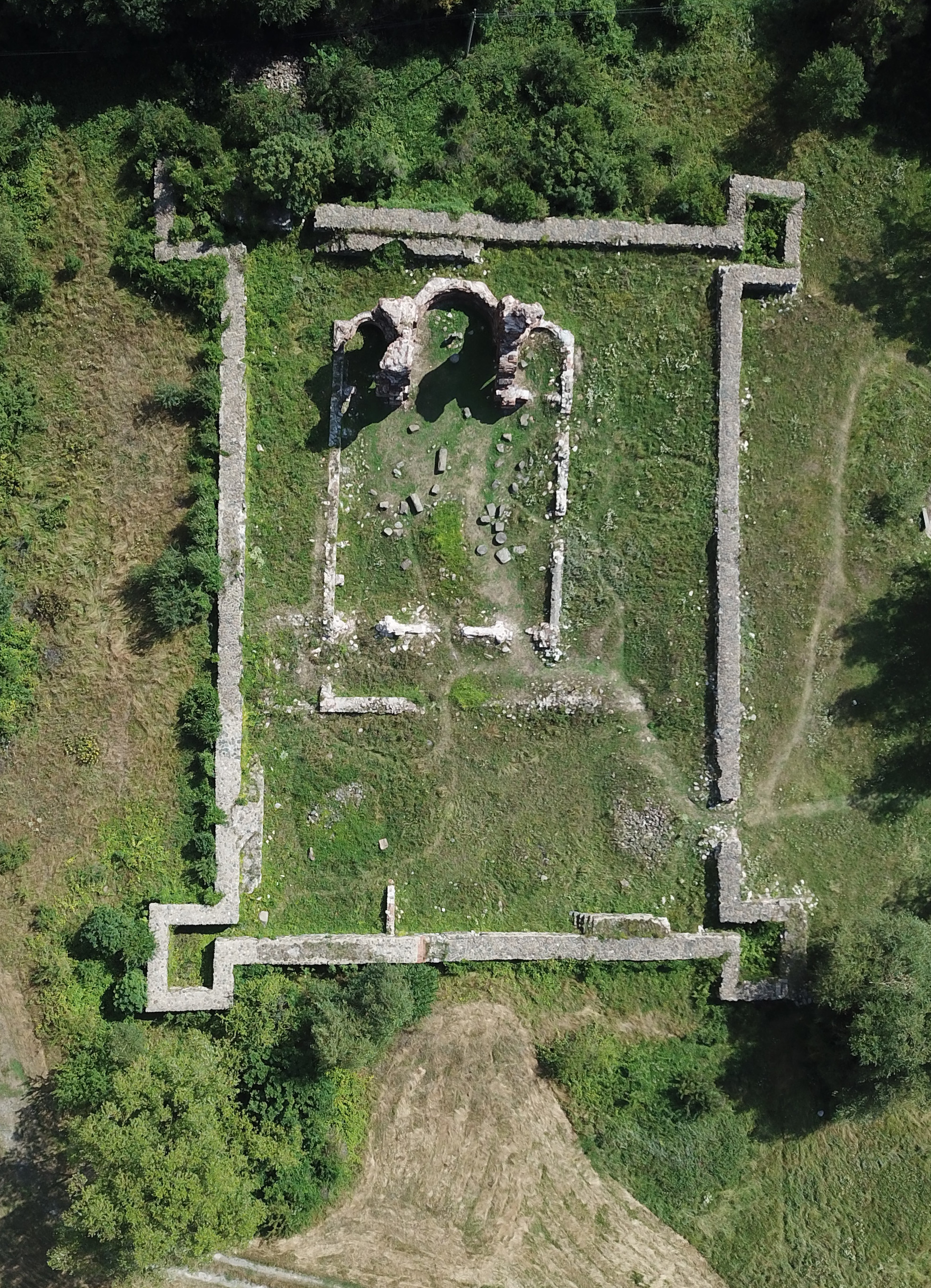
Bird's eye view of the complex

Archaeologists have clearly distinguished two separate building periods based on the basilica's ruins. The Elenska Basilica's middle and western sections are older and constructed out of brick and crushed stones, whereas the more recent eastern section was built out of homogeneous bricks with thick grouts joined using red mortar. Analysis of the church's ruins, which are up to 8.5 metres (28 ft) in height, has established that it was a three-naved basilica. The church's dimensions were 30.5 by 17 m (100 by 56 ft). It featured a large apse in the centre, flanked by two smaller apses. The middle nave was divided into two squares by four identical columns. The narthex, which lay in the church's western section, accommodated a diaconicon and a prothesis. A baptisterium was located in the church's southern section. A 1.6 m (5.2 ft) wide defensive wall surrounded the church. Four rectangular defensive towers were located in each corner of the wall. The towers were almost identical in size and measured around 7.30 by 5.90 m (24.0 by 19.4 ft). The defensive wall is thought to have been 6 to 8 m (20 to 26 ft) tall.

== History ==
The Elensko area where the church is located (and which was the basis for its name) was known to have been inhabited in antiquity by a Thracian tribe Coelaletae, whсich around the 6th–5th century BC joined the Bessi state. The site is an ancient Thracian sanctuary. Thracologist Alexander Fol links the area's name (which he derives from the Slavic word елен elen, "deer") to an ancient legend about a deer who would descend from the Balkan Mountains on the same day every year to be ritually sacrificed by the native Thracians. Indeed, plenty of deer remains have been unearthed in the vicinity of the basilica. Another theory derives the name of the area from the Bulgarianized name of the Greeks, елини elini ("Hellenes"), explained by the church's construction in the early Byzantine period.

It was built towards the end of the 5th century and rebuilt during the reign of Emperor Justinian the Great (527 - 565). The construction of the defensive fortress system is associated with the early Slavic attacks in the 6th - early 7th centuries on the Balkans. The Elenska Basilica was in active use during the Second Bulgarian Empire (11th–14th century) as a literary centre and an Eastern Orthodox monastery. A 13th-century literary work in Middle Bulgarian, the Pirdop Acts of the Apostles, may have been authored there, as a legend says it was discovered in the church's ruins in the 19th century. It remained in use until around 1700, when the local Ottoman forces under Yahya Pasha are thought to have purposefully destroyed it during a military campaign. The Ottomans reportedly bombarded the church with cannons and set it ablaze because they regarded the monks as rebellious.

The earliest archaeological research on the Elenska Basilica dates to the 1890s, when local teachers explored the ruins. Archaeologist Petar Mutafchiev conducted excavations in 1913 and published his findings in the article The Elenska Basilica in the vicinity of Pirdop. The church has only been slightly reconstructed since then. The basilica's ruins are in a satisfactory and stable condition, though the surrounding defensive wall has been mostly destroyed.
