= Pirdop copper smelter and refinery =

Coordinates: 42°43′N 24°10′E

Aurubis Bulgaria
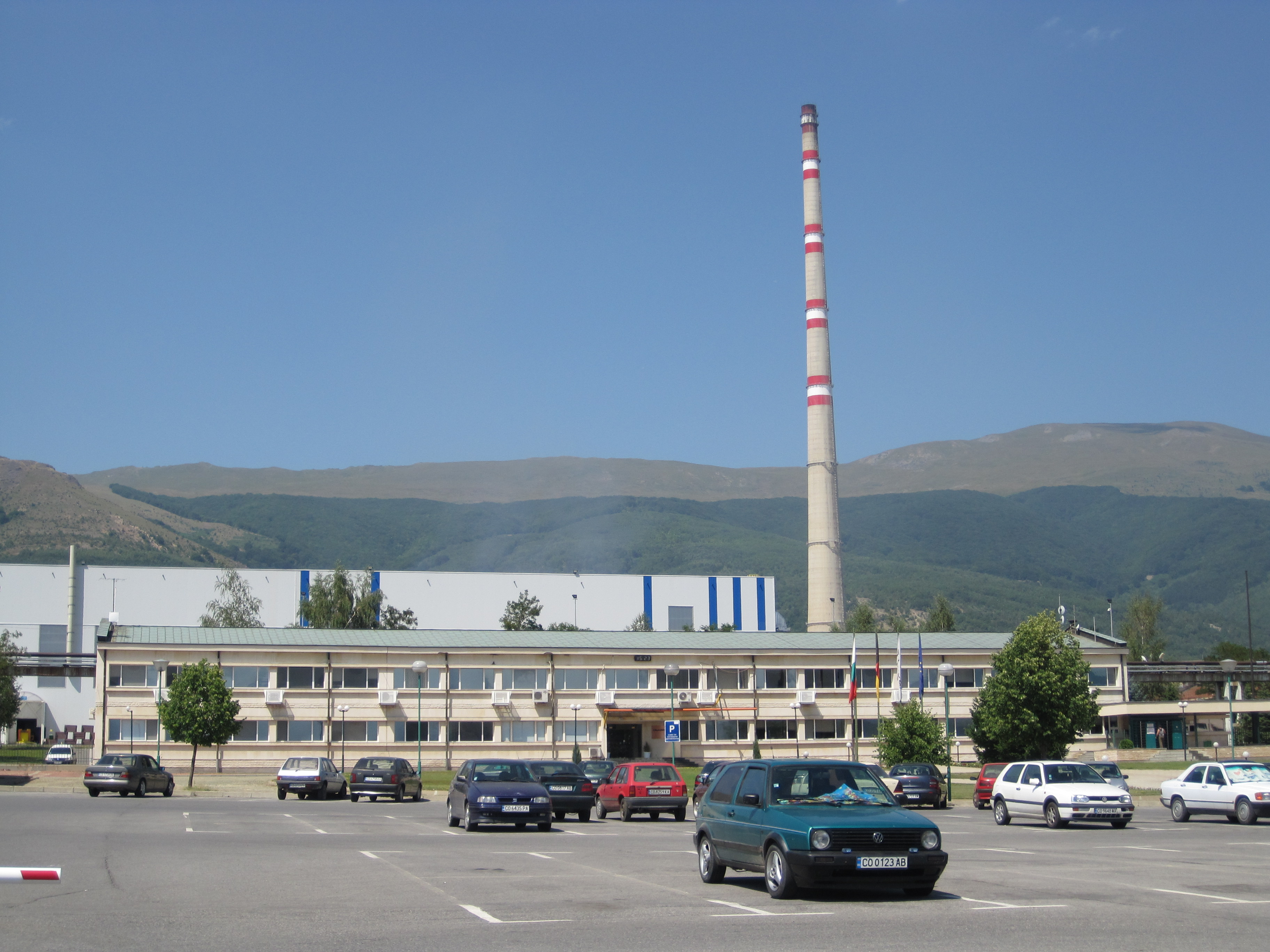
- Type: private
- Industry: copper
- Founded: 1958
- Headquarters: Pirdop, Bulgaria
- Revenue: US$2.3 billion (2007)
- Number of employees: 885

Pirdop copper smelter and refinery is the biggest facility for smelting and refining of copper in South-Eastern Europe. The factory is situated between the towns of Pirdop and Zlatitsa in the Sofia Province, western Bulgaria. The plant, which was founded in 1958, had an initial annual capacity of 160,000 tons, which has been expanded to 340,000 tons at present.

In addition, it produces 830,000 tons of sulfuric acid and small amounts of silver, gold and selenium. The number of employees is 800. The main chimney of the smelter is 325.4 metres tall, 0.4 metres taller than the Maritza East power stations chimneys and 2 metres taller than the Eiffel Tower.

== Corporate history ==
The plant was founded in 1958. In 1997, the company was sold to Cumerio a company from Belgium for US$80 million becoming Cumerio Med; at the time it was Bulgaria's largest copper smelting company, producing around 240,000 tonnes of smelted copper and around 60,000 tonnes of copper cathodes each year. In 2007, the company was bought by German company Norddeutsche Affinerie (now Aurubis).

== See also ==
- List of tallest structures in Bulgaria
