= Viskyar Mountain =

Mountain range in Bulgaria

Viskyar
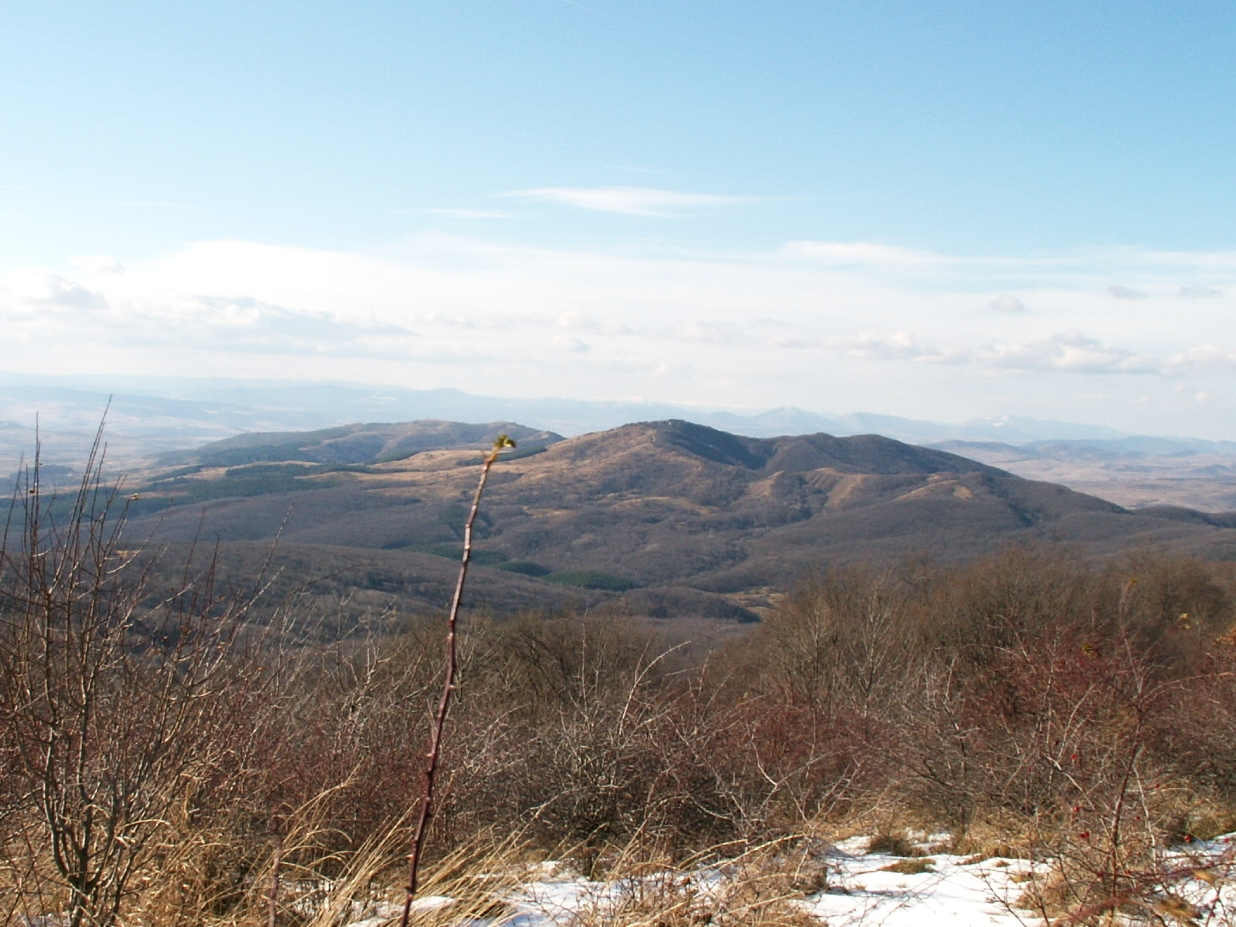
- Viskyar seen from Lyulin

Highest point
- Elevation: 1,136 m (3,727 ft)
- Coordinates: 42°45′40″N 22°56′39″E

Naming
- Native name: Вискяр (Bulgarian)

Geography
- Location within Bulgaria
- Location: Bulgaria

Viskyar (Bulgarian: Вискяр) is a mountain range in western Bulgaria with an altitude of 1,136 meters above sea level. It is part of the Srednogorie mountain system that from west to east includes the mountain ranges of Greben, Zavalska Planina, Viskyar, Lyulin, Vitosha, Plana and Sredna Gora. Viskyar Ridge on Greenwich Island in the South Shetland Islands, Antarctica is named after it.

== Geography ==
The mountain range is situated between the Burel Valley to the north, the Sofia Valley to the northeast, and the Breznik Valley to the south. To the southwest the Yaroslavska Saddle (964 m) links it with Zavalska Planina and to the southest the Raduy Saddle (830 m) links it with Lyulin. Its length in northwest–southeast direction is about 15 km; the width is 5–6 km at most. Viskyar is a low mountain range with a flat main ridge and short indented slopes. The highest summit is Chekanska Buka (1,136 m), situated in its northwesternmost part. Viskyar is built up of andesites, sandstones, tuffs and tuffites.

The main watershed divide of the Balkan Peninsula, separating the Black Sea drainage basin to the north and the Aegean Sea one to the south, runs along the mountain range. It is the source of the Gaberska reka, a left tributary of the Nišava, the Slivnishka reka of the Iskar drainage, and several small tributaries of the Konska reka of the Struma river basin. Most of Viskyar is covered with pastures and meadows; there are small deciduous forests of oak and beech on the northeastern slopes.

== Settlements and transport ==
There are one town and 30 villages in the mountain range and along its foothills. In Sofia Province are the villages of Bratushkovo, Barlozhnitsa, Gorno Selo, Gurgulyat, Galabovtsi, Delyan, Dragotintsi, Dreatin, Zlatusha, Nachevo, Pishtane, Povalirazh, Radulovtsi, Rakita, Hrabarsko, Tsatsarovtsi, Chekanets and Yalbotina. In Pernik Province are located the town of Breznik and the villages of Arzan, Babitsa, Brusnik, Viskear, Goz, Gorni Romantsi, Dolni Romantsi, Zavala, Krasava, Ozarnovtsi, Radui, Rasnik and Yaroslavtsi.

The southern reaches of Viskyar are traversed by two roads of the national network, a 13.2 km section of the third class III-638 road Breznik–Zlatusha–Bozhurishte between Breznik and Zlatusha, as well as a 14 km stretch of the third class III-811 road Beledie Han–Slivnitsa–Breznik between Galabovtsi and Breznik. Railway line No. 5 Voluyak–Pernik–Kyustendil–Gyueshevo runs through the Raduy Pass between Viskyar and Lyulin.
