= Gaberska River =

Gaberska reka

Location
- Country: Bulgaria, Serbia

Physical characteristics
- Source
  - location: Viskyar Mountain
  - coordinates: 42°47′42″N 22°53′58.92″E
  - elevation: 1,012 m (3,320 ft)
- Mouth
  - location: Nišava
  - coordinates: 43°0′47.16″N 22°45′11.88″E
  - elevation: 445 m (1,460 ft)
- Length: 36 km (22 mi)
- Basin size: 191 km^{2} (74 sq mi)

Basin features
- Progression: Nišava→ South Morava→ Great Morava→ Danube→ Black Sea

The Gaberska reka (Bulgarian: Габерска река) is a river in western Bulgaria and southeastern Serbia, a left tributary of the Nišava, of the Danube basin. Its length is 36 km, of which 31 km are in Bulgaria and 5 km are in Serbia.

The river takes its source at the foothills of the summit of Chekanska Buka (1,136 m), the highest peak of the Viskyar Mountain. It then flows near the village of Pishtane and received its tributary the Ozarnovska reka near the village of Povalirazh, flowing eastwards until that point. The river then flows in northern direction until Dragotintsi, where it bends northwest and at the village of Dolna Nevlya reaches the border with Serbia and turns north. It then serves as the Bulgaria–Serbia border for some 7 km and then again turns northwest, entering Serbia entirely. In about 5 km it flows into the Nišava between the town of Dimitrovgrad and the village of Željuša at an altitude of 445 m. As the river flows through the Burel Valley, it is sometimes called the Burelska reka.

Its drainage basin covers a territory of 191 km^{2}, of which 90% are in Bulgaria and 10% are in Serbia.

The Gaberska reka flows in Pernik and Sofia Provinces of Bulgaria and Pirot District of Serbia. There are nine settlements along its course, Brusnik in Pernik Province, Pishtane, Povalirazh, Dragotintsi, Gaber, Nedelishte, Nesla and Dolna Nesla in Sofia Province, as well as Lukavica in Pirot District. There is a coal mine near Gaber and a railway has been constructed along the river valley between the mine and Dragotintsi. Sections of two roads of the Bulgarian national network follow the Gaberska reka, the third class III-813 road Dragoman–Tran, and the third class III-8112 road Gaber–Slivnitsa.
