= Slivnitsa =

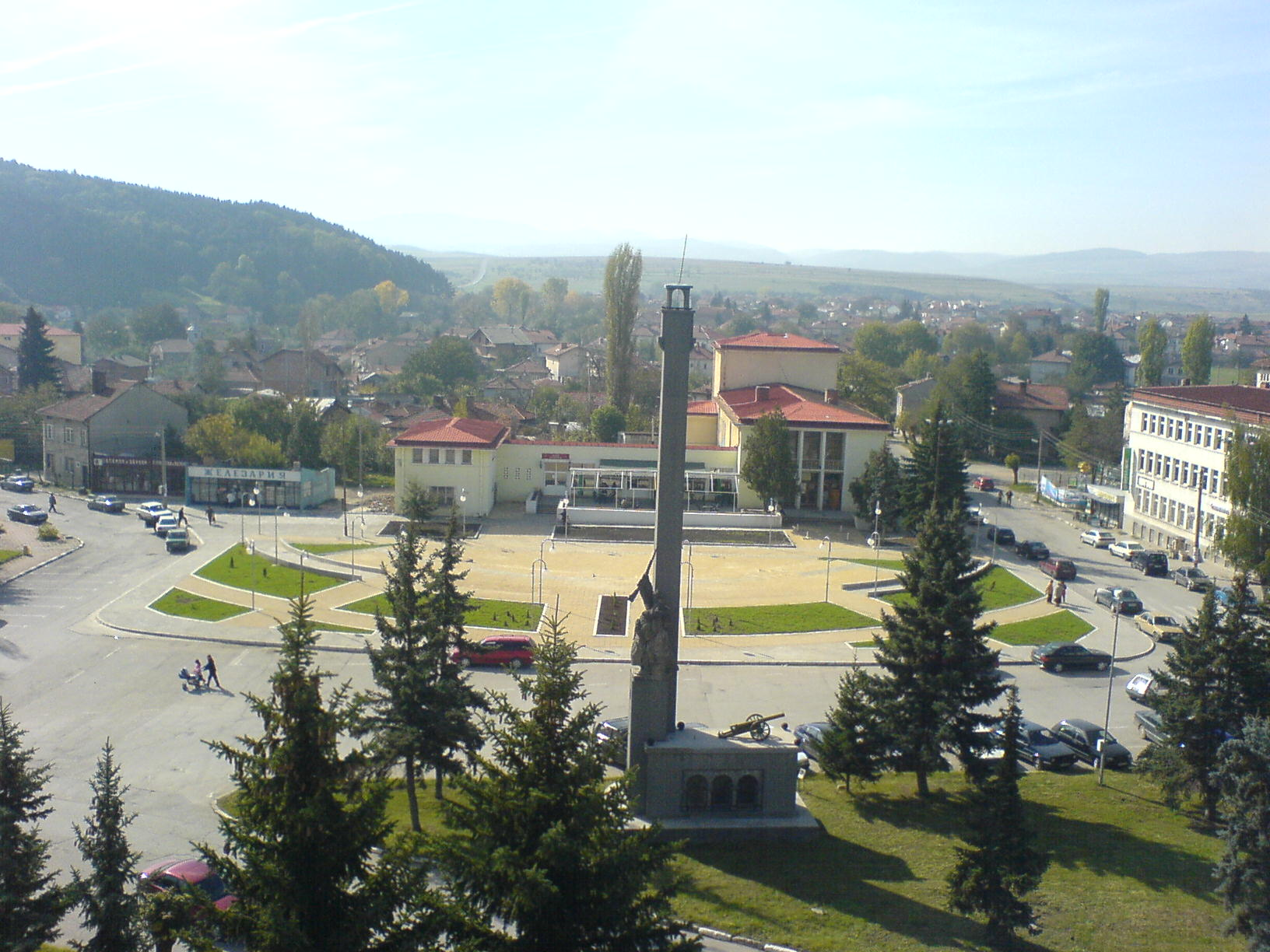

- Coat of arms

- Location of Slivnitsa
- Coordinates: 42°51′N 23°2′E
- Country: Bulgaria
- Provinces (Oblast): Sofia Province

Government
  - Mayor: Vasko Stoilkov
- Elevation: 525 m (1,722 ft)

Population (2005-09-13)
  - Total: 7,901
- Time zone: UTC+2 (EET)
  - Summer (DST): UTC+3 (EEST)
- Postal Code: 2200
- Area code: 0727

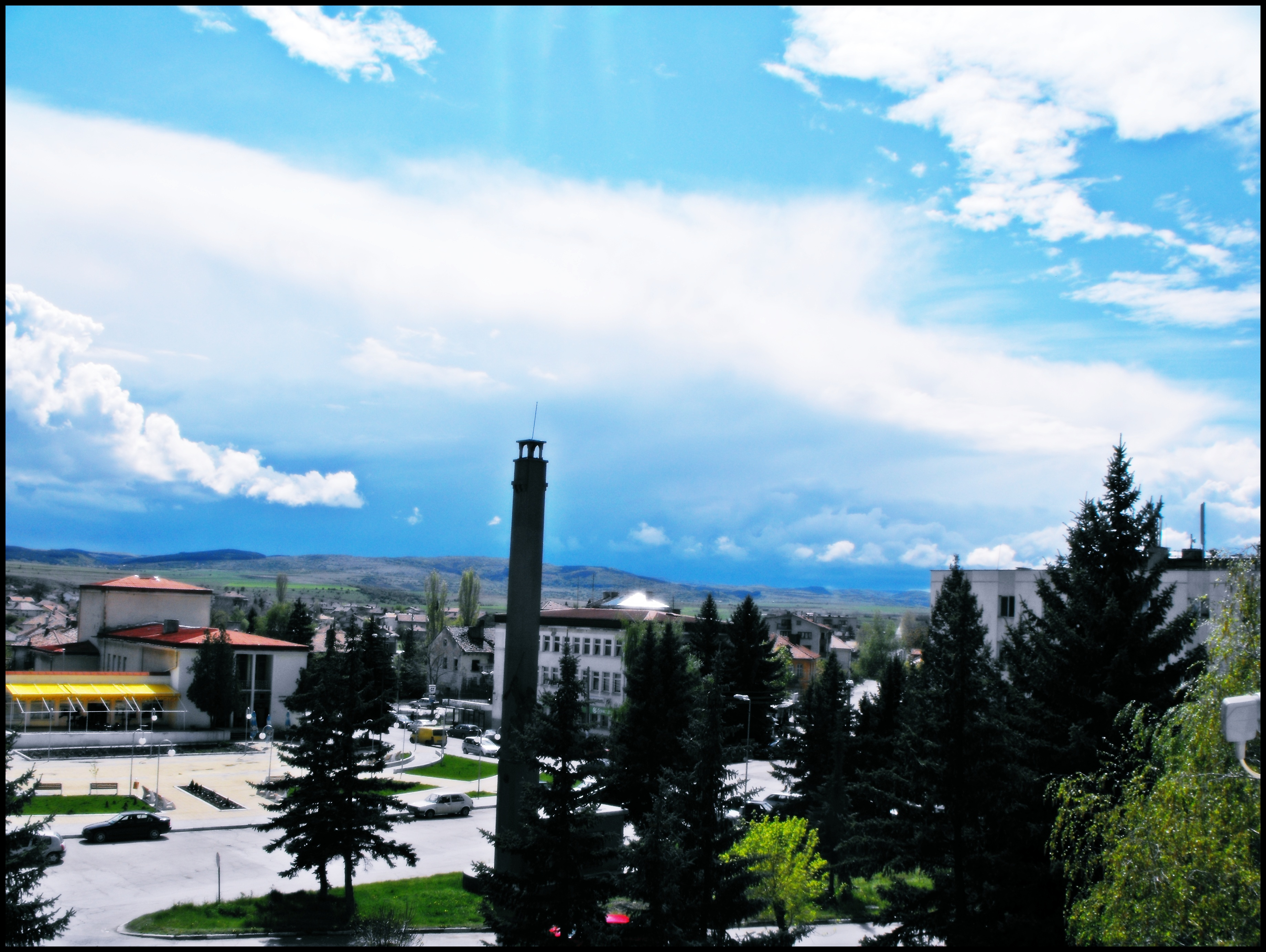
Slivnitsa with the monument of the victims of the Serbo-Bulgarian War

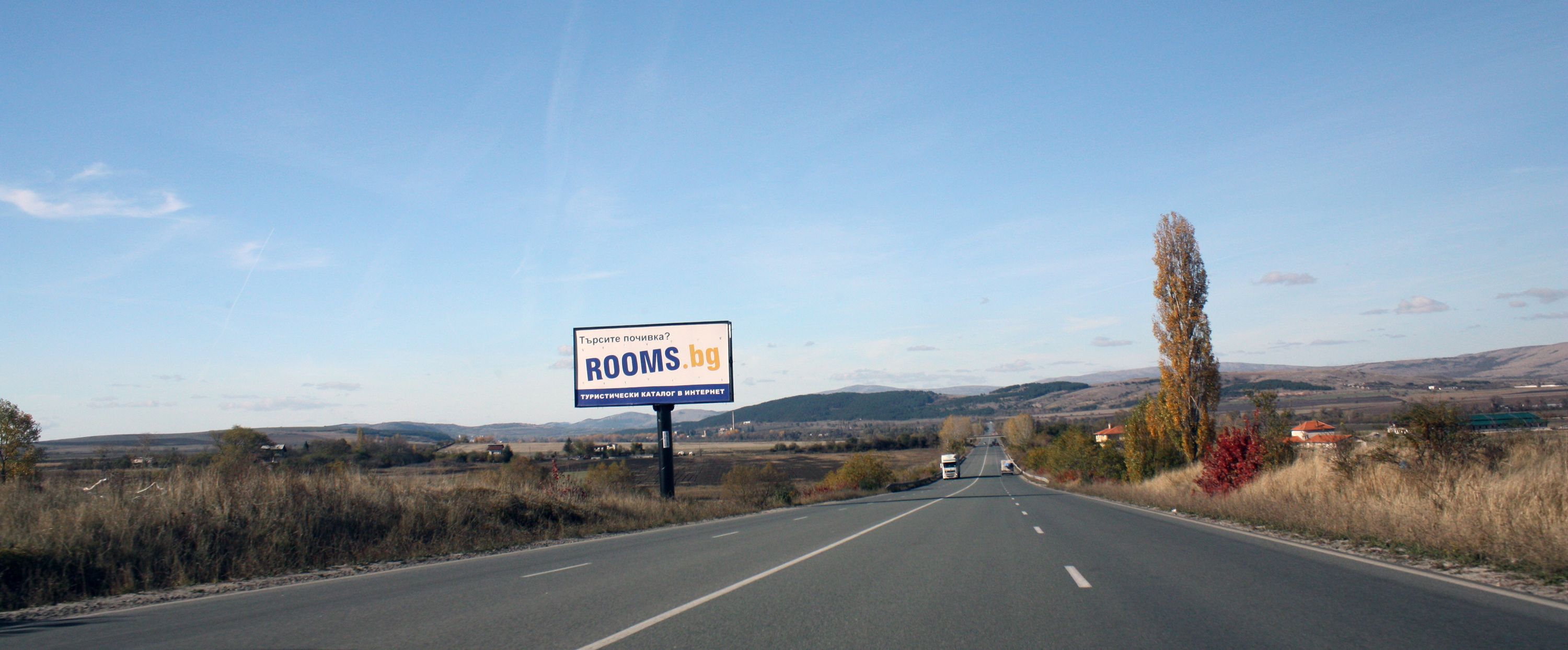
European route E80 at Slivnitsa

Slivnitsa (Bulgarian: Сливница [ˈslivnit͡sɐ]) is a town in western Bulgaria, 22 km away from Sofia, lying on the main road connecting the capital with the Bulgarian-Serbian border. Slivnitsa is part of Sofia Province and is close to the towns of Kostinbrod and Dragoman.

Called by historians the "battle of the captains vs the generals," referring to the young Bulgarian army, whose highest rank went up to a captain, the Battle of Slivnitsa was a decisive factor in the victory of the Bulgarian Army over the Serbs between 17 and 19 November 1885. It solidified the unification between the Kingdom of Bulgaria and Eastern Rumelia.

The town lies in the western reaches of the Sofia Valley. A small mountain range named Viskyar stands out to the south and the southwest of Slivnitsa. The mountain's highest peak is Mechi Kamak (Мечи камък, "Bear's Stone") and is 1,077 m high. Viskyar is rich in archeological and historical remains. Important strategic and commercial roads, connecting the southern end of the Balkan peninsula with the Danube River and Western Europe, have passed through these lands since Antiquity. An interesting sight is the memorial pantheon, built to the southeast of the Gurgulyat village.

== Municipality ==
Slivnitsa is the seat of Slivnitsa Municipality, part of Sofia Province, which also includes the following 12 villages:

- Aldomirovtsi
- Bahalin
- Bratushkovo
- Barlozhnitsa
- Gurgulyat
- Dragotintsi
- Galabovtsi
- Izvor
- Pishtane
- Povalirazh
- Radulovtsi
- Rakita

== Gallery ==
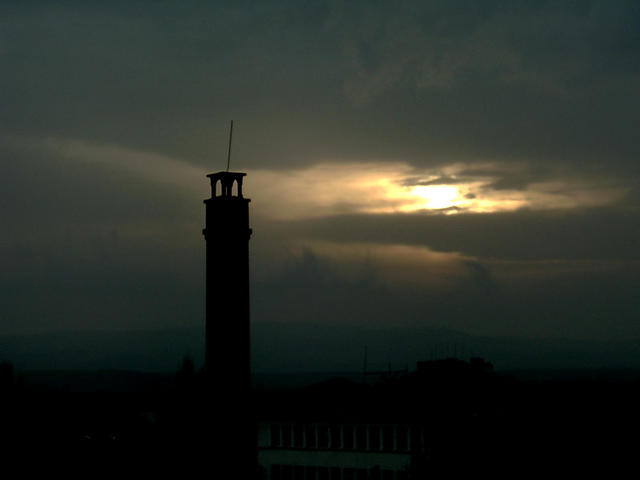
Night sky

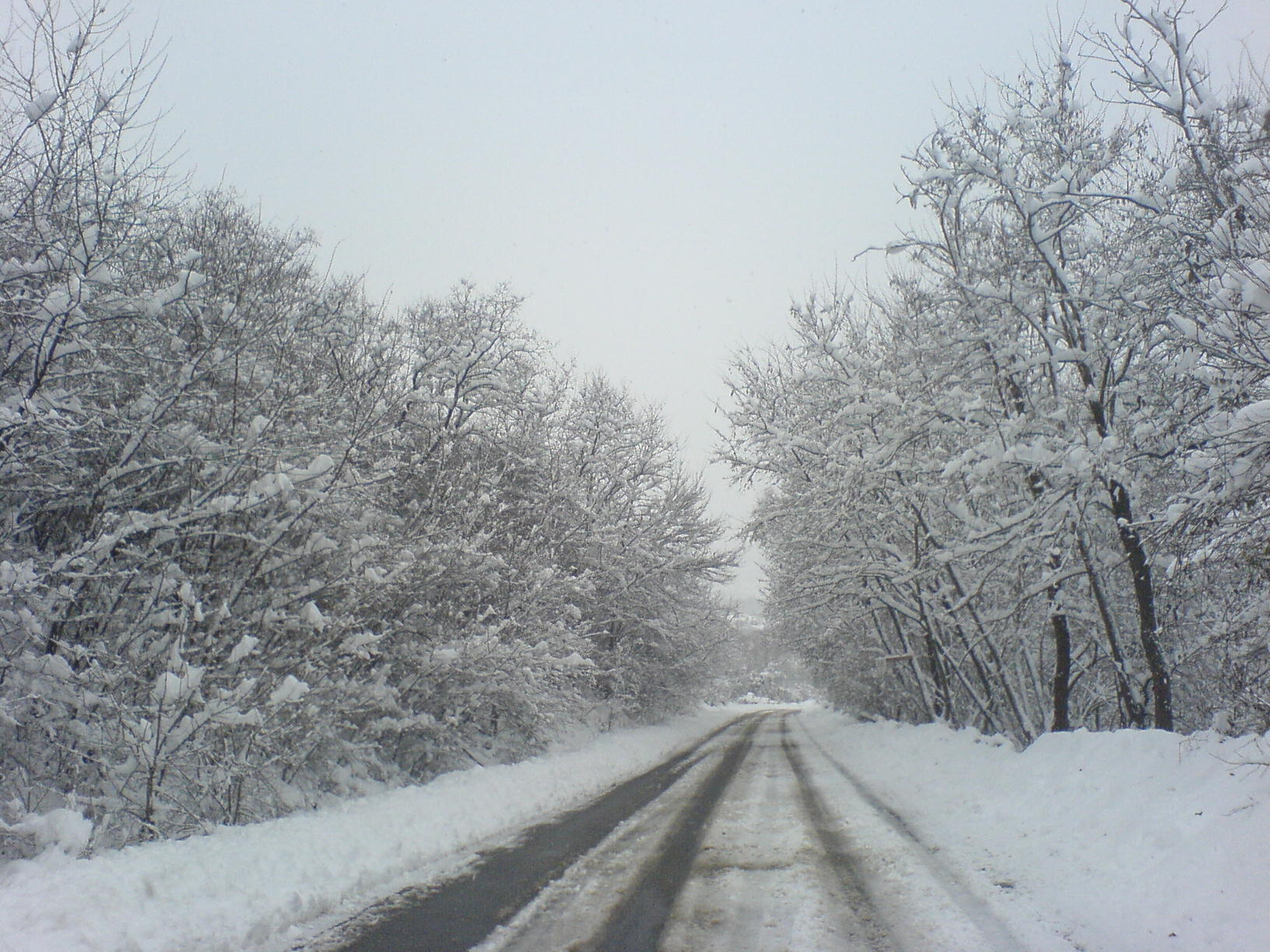
Road to "Voinishka mahala"

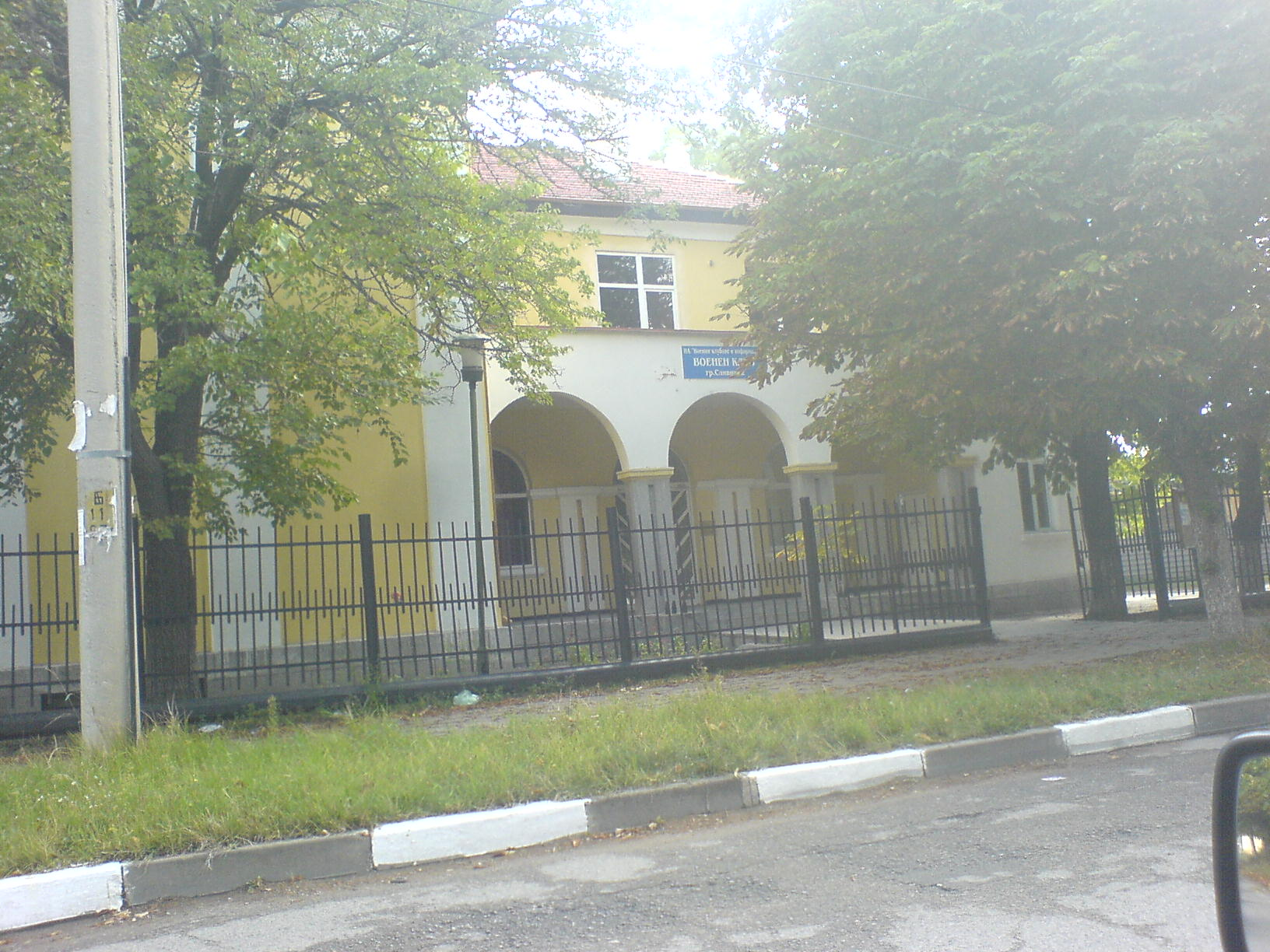
Military club

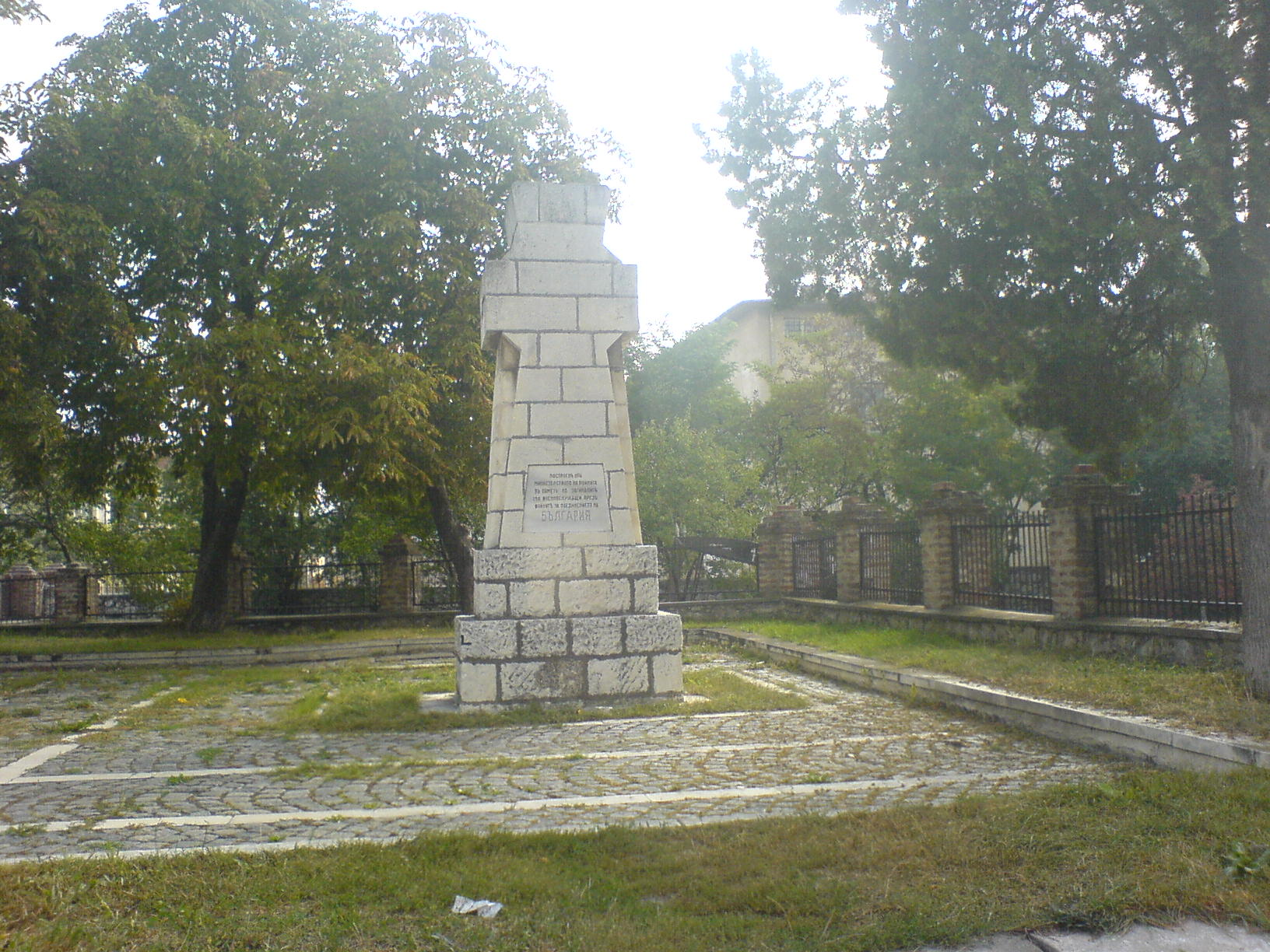
Soldier's Memorial

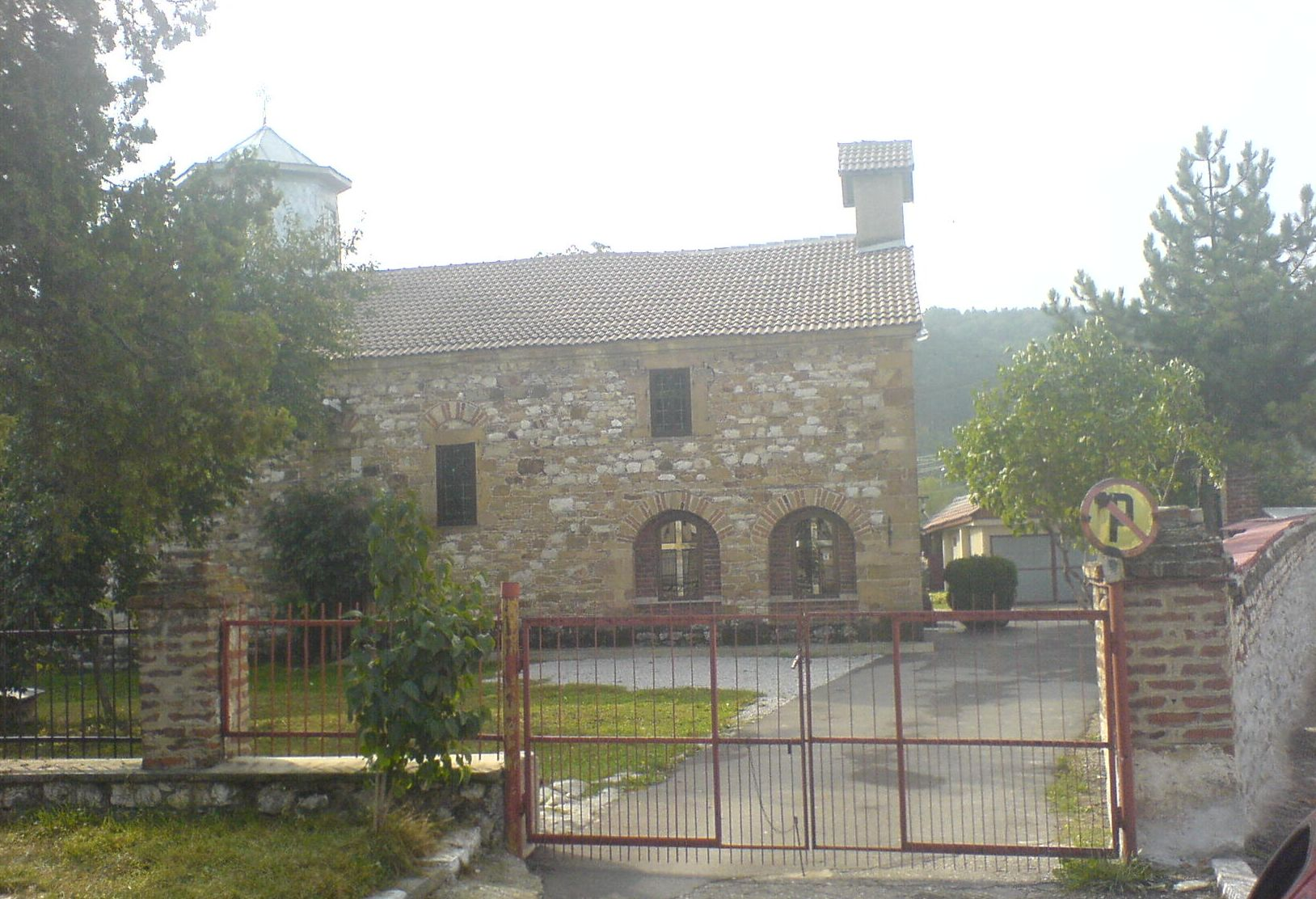
Church "Saints Cyril and Methodius"

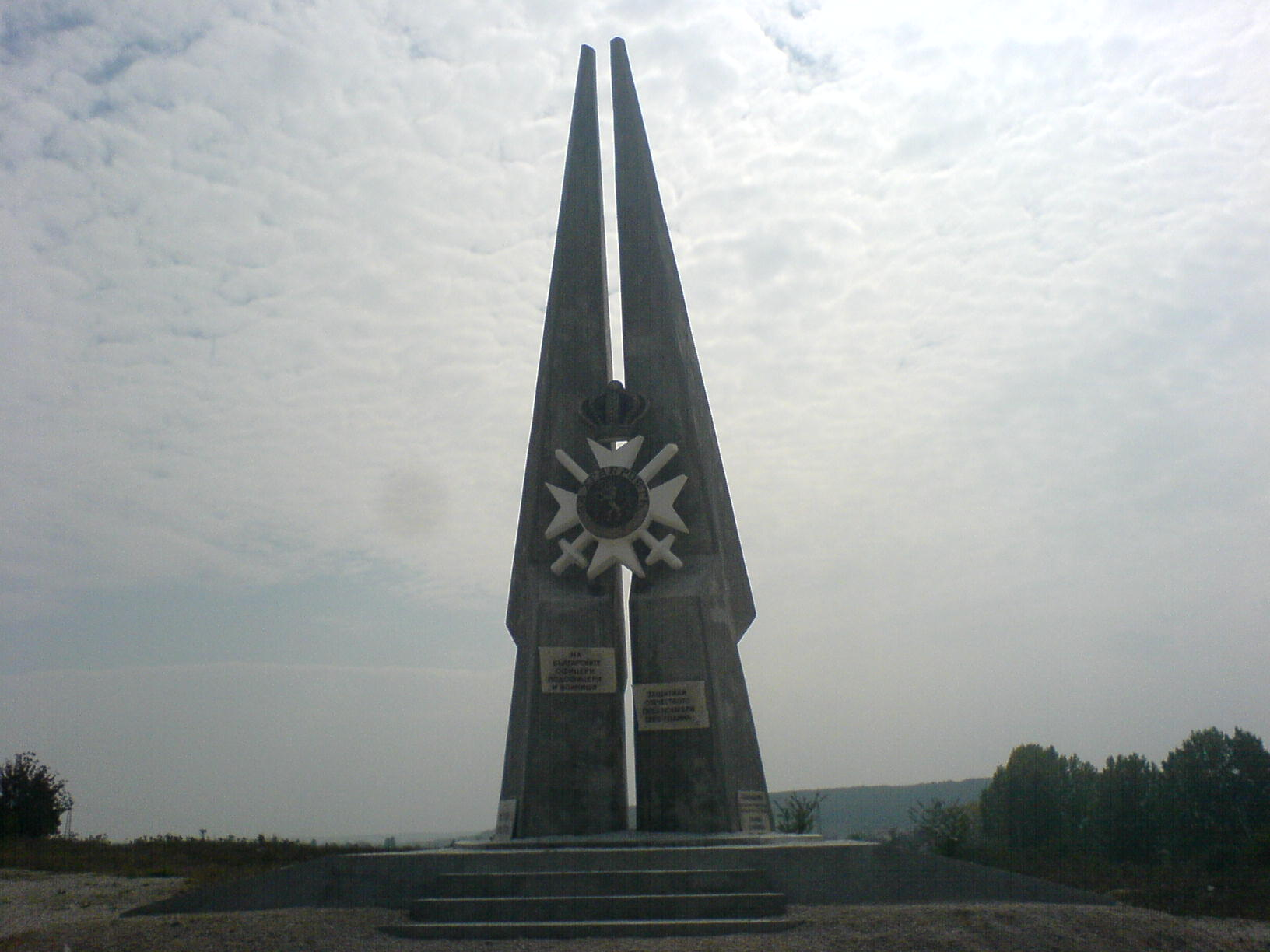
New memorial for anniversary from Serbo-Bulgarian War, road Е80, author Petko Moskov

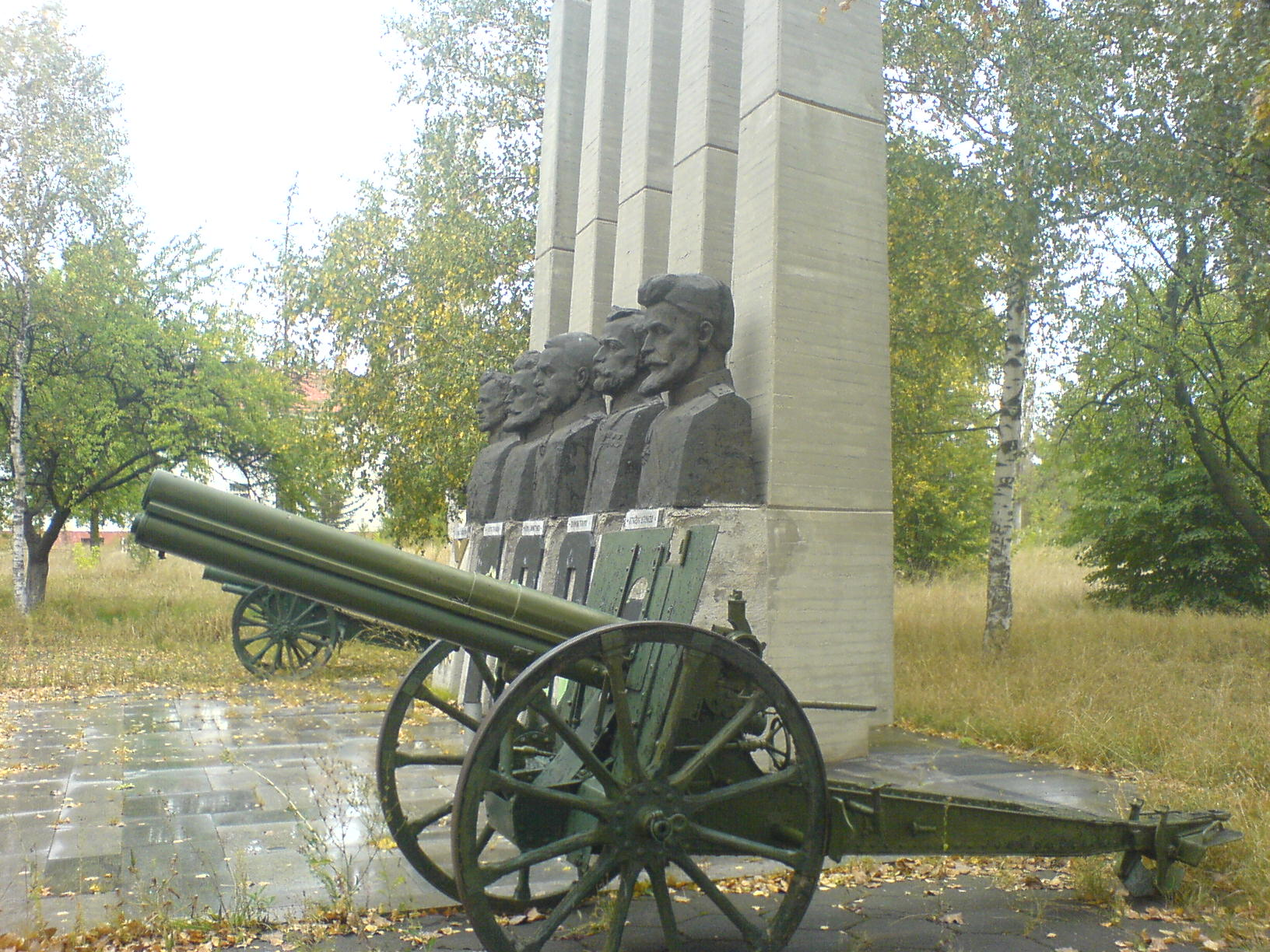
Captain's memorial

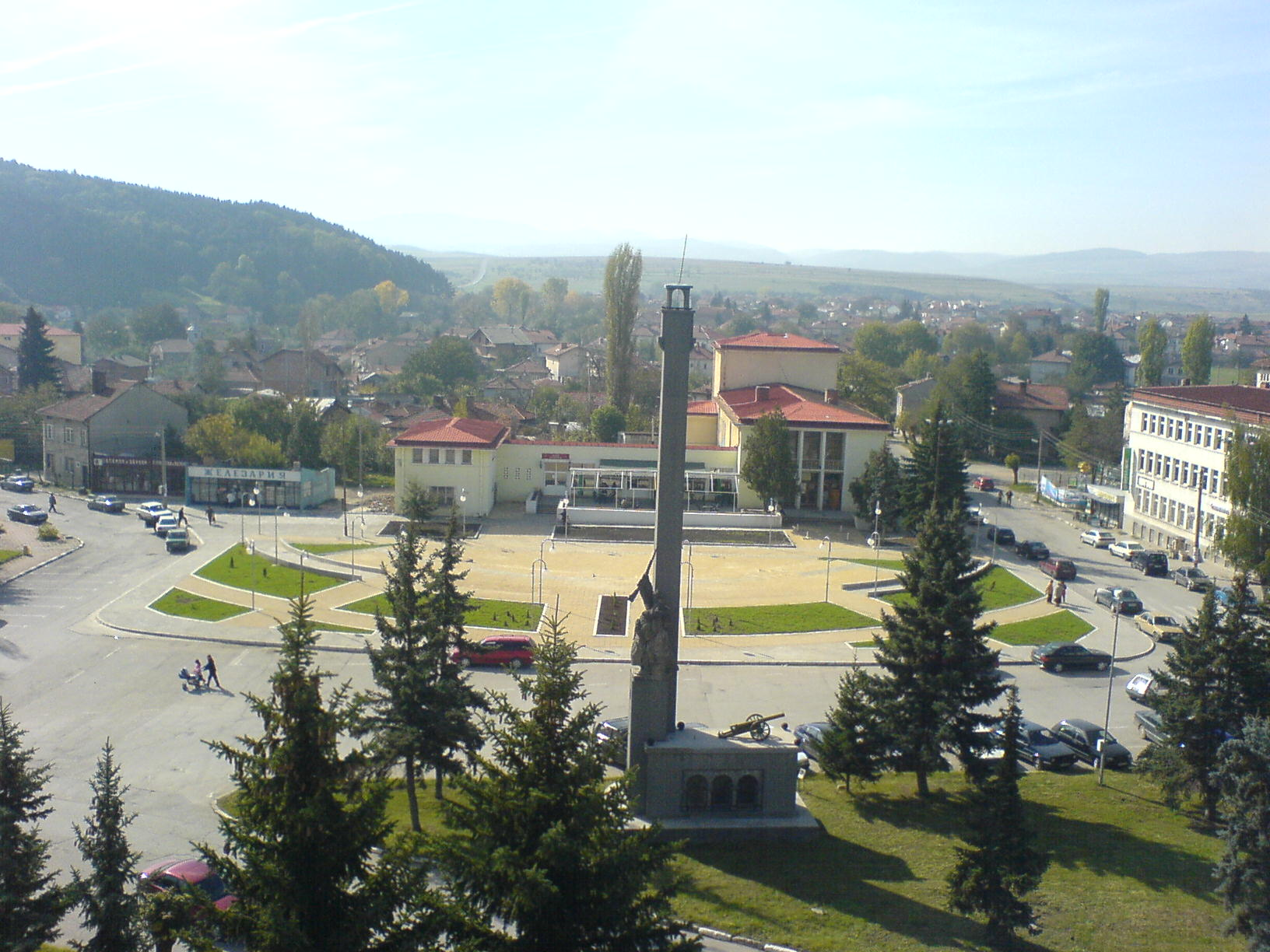
Town center
