= Battle of Banjski Dol =

1885 battle of the Serbo-Bulgarian War

- Part of Serbo-Bulgarian War
Date	November 2, 1885
Location	Banjski Dol, Pernik Province, Bulgaria
Result	Serbian victory

Belligerents
Serbia	Bulgaria

Commanders and leaders
Stefan Binički	Andrei Bucharestliev

Units involved
Šumadija Division	Dolnonevlyanski Detachment

Casualties and losses
2 killed, 3 wounded	2 killed, 35 wounded

The Battle of Banjski Dol was a battle of the Serbo-Bulgarian War that took place between the Bulgarian Dolnonevlyanski Detachment and the Serbian Šumadija Division on November 2, 1885.

== The Battle ==
Upon invading Bulgaria on November 2, the Shumadia Division received an order to seize the Kukla newspaper near Banski Dol, occupying the villages of Beli Kamik and Vlasi, and provide contact with the Nisava Army .

At the villages of Grapa, Gorna Darzhina, Vlasi and Banski dol the division was met with heavy artillery fire by the Dolnonevlyansk cover detachment consisting of 1 reserve company and 4 detachments of Breznik and Csaribrod volunteers. The small size of the detachment forced its commander, Captain Andrei Bucharestliev, to withdraw to the Kukla newspaper. In order for the division to continue its attack, a complete deployment of its vanguard units was required. The detachment did not wait for the attack and withdrew again, this time to the village of Dolna Nevlya.

Instead of continuing the attack in the direction of Nesla-Gaber-Aldomirovtsi-Slivnitsa, the Shumadia division settled around the village of Borovo, and the main forces spent the night in the border area near the village of Banski dol.

The task of the Dolnonevlyansky covert detachment is to deploy and reconnoiter the enemy, slowing him down and inflicting maximum losses on him. The detachment, under the command of Captain Bucharestliev, managed to successfully complete the given task, and for the entire first day of hostilities the division managed to enter only 4 km. in the territory of the Principality of Bulgaria.
