= First Battle of Caribrod =

Battle of the Serbo-Bulgarian War

- Part of Serbo–Bulgarian War
Date	November 14, 1885; November 2, 1885 (O.S.)
Location	Caribrod, Principality of Bulgaria (modern-day Serbia)
Result	Serbian victory
Territorial changes	Serbia captured Caribrod, first Bulgarian territories occupied

Belligerents
Kingdom of Serbia	Principality of Bulgaria

Commanders and leaders
General Milutin Jovanović	Captain Hristo Popov

Units involved
Danube Division	Caribrod detachment

The First Battle of Caribrod (Bulgarian: Бой при Цариброд, Serbian: Битка код Цариброда) took place during the Serbo–Bulgarian War on November 2, 1885 (O.S.) between the Royal Serbian Army and Bulgarian Army around Caribrod, today Dimitrovgrad, Serbia.

== Background ==
The Unification of Bulgaria was not accepted by all Balkan states. Greece and Serbia were the main opponents to this Bulgarian move believing that this would endanger their plans for Macedonia. On November 2, 1885, King Milan I declared war on the Principality of Bulgaria and the same day, the Royal Serbian Army started an attack on the Bulgarian Army, in an attempt to quickly reach Sofia and capture Bulgaria. The King thought Bulgaria would be too busy preparing for war with the Ottoman Empire, and that its Western borders would be largely undefended. Before the attack, the Danube Division of the Niš Army was taking positions around Pirot and preparing the action towards Caribrod.

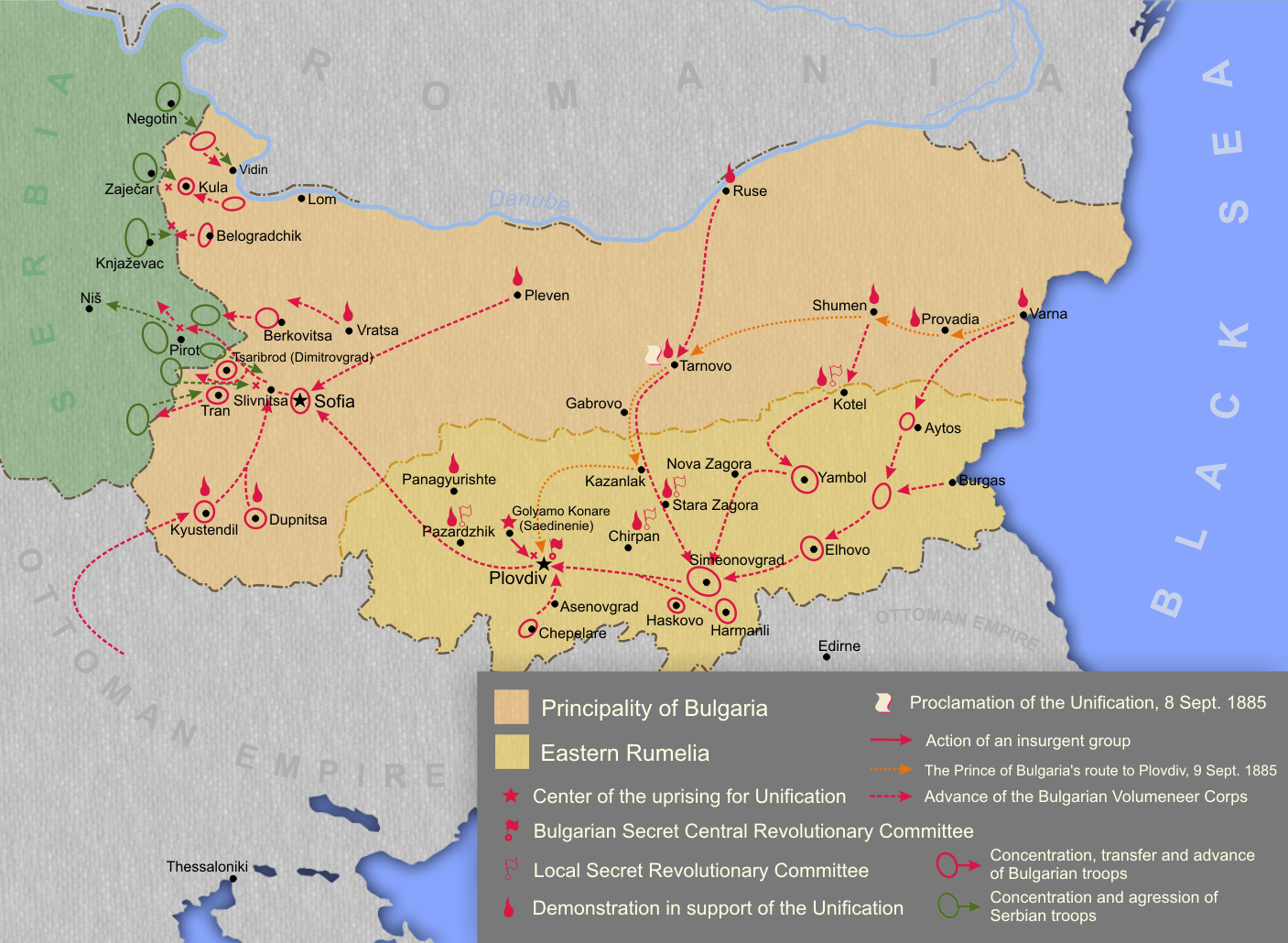
Map of the Serbo-Bulgarian War

== Battle ==
The Serbian attack started on November 2, when the Royal Serbian Army launched an attack within 3–4 hours of late in for directions towards Sofia, and in every direction, there was a single division. The forces ratio before the battle was 7:1 in Serbian favor.

=== Plan of the battle ===
The Danube Division was tasked to enter Bulgarian territory, capture Caribrod, come to line Kalotina – Vishan, and to take the Dragoman pass. In that way, the Danube Division will be able to support the Šumadija Division on the right side.

Forces of the Danube Division, commanded by General Milutin Jovanović, were divided into two columns. The division's right column was composed of the 7th Serbian Infantry Regiment that attacked from Srećkovac to Željuša and continued to Caribrod and the left column was composed of the 9th Infantry Regiment, which had to pass the village of Činiglavci and continue to Caribrod. Cavalry Brigade, commanded by Colonel Jovan Praporčetović, and the 19th Guard Battalion with one artillery battery were positioned near Tepoš village. They had the task to pass the state border, reach villages Odorovci and attack finish on line Stanyantsi – Izvor. Drina Division, commanded by Colonel Jovan Mišković, was left in reserve until the main forces passed Sukovo Bridge. Šumadija Division, commanded by Colonel Stevan Binički, was in the valley of Jerma river, which was also the direction of progressing towards Bulgaria. Morava Division, commanded by Colonel Petar Topalović, had task to control road Pirot – Tran and take the final town on that road.

Captain Hristo Popov commanded the Caribrod Detachment. His detachment comprised one infantry battalion, three opalchentsi companies, and one cavalry squadron.

=== Realisation of the plan ===
All Serbian divisions very soon after the start of the attack made contact with Bulgarians and had great fire resistance. Morava Division was stopped for about two hours by Opalchentsi detachment with 60 fighters after passing the border near Daschen pass. Later division stayed on Ruj Mountain where stayed during the night because of fog without any greater success. Šumadija Division was stopped by a small battalion of Captain Andrei Bukureshtliev (4th Plevne Infantry Regiment) on the road between Planinci and Banjski Dol. Danube Division only had approximate success to the planned one. Caribrod Detachment resisted to Danube Division near Caribrod for a bit of time and at 16:30 Serbs captured Caribrod but they couldn't continue to the planned line Kalotina–Vishan. Because of no need to make unnecessary casualties, the Caribrod Detachment retreated to its positions near Dragoman. The right column stopped its attack in Lukavica village where forces stayed during the night. Cavalry Brigade awaited the 19th Infantry Regiment and an artillery battery to be sent to their positions. Cavalry Brigade launched an attack at 14:00 and on the night came to the Smilovci village where it was waited by the badly fortified detachment of Bahchevanov (one infantry battalion, one cavalry squadron, and 4 cannons). In the night that detachment together retreated to Stanyantsi village to avoid any unnecessary casualties.

The battle was concluded without any major Bulgarian casualties and also without great territorial success as the Royal Serbian Army was only able to advance 5 kilometres into Bulgarian territory.

== See also ==
- Serbo-Bulgarian War
- Battle of Slivnitsa
- Dimitrovgrad, Serbia
