= Slivnitsa Municipality =

Coordinates: 42°51′N 23°02′E

Slivnitsa Municipality Община Сливница
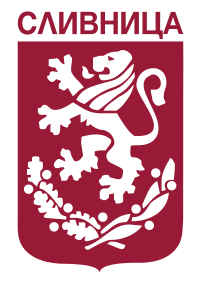
- Seal

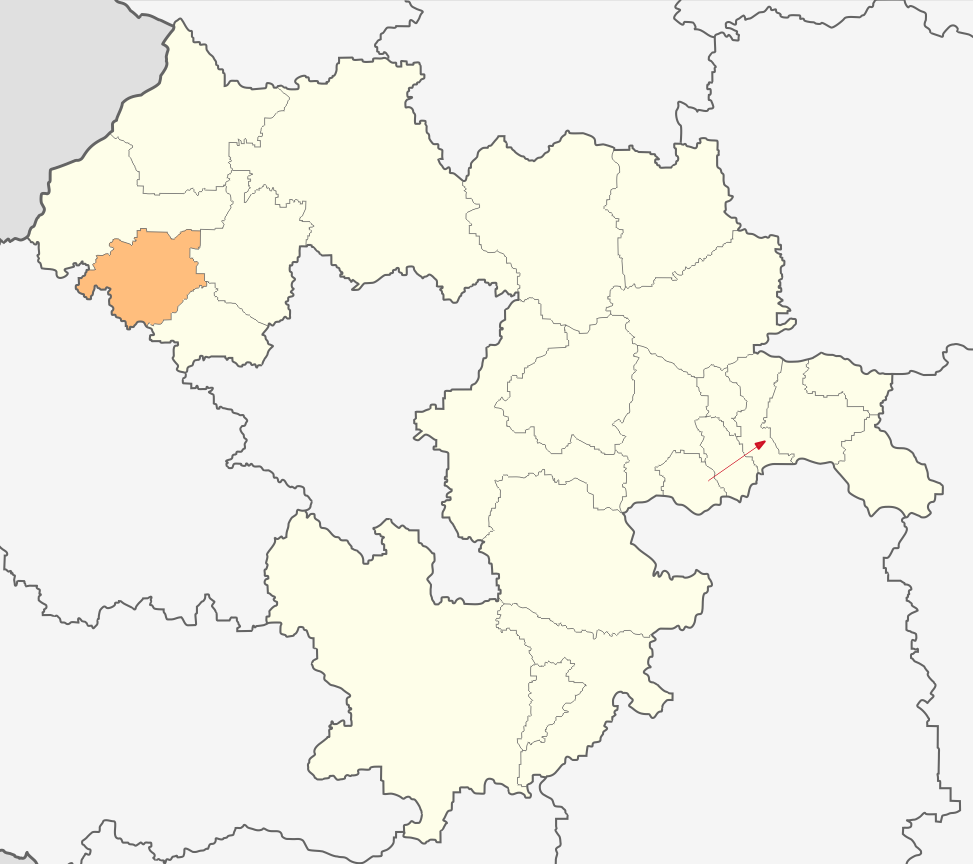
- Country: Bulgaria
- Province: Sofia Province
- Seat: Slivnitsa

Area
  - Total: 187.4 km^{2} (72.4 sq mi)

Population (2024)
  - Total: 8,678
  - Density: 46.31/km^{2} (119.9/sq mi)
- Website: www.slivnitsa.bg

Slivnitsa Municipality (Bulgarian: Община Сливница) is a municipality in Sofia Province, western Bulgaria. Covering a territory of 187.4 km^{2}, it is the fourteenth largest of the 22 municipalities in the province, encompassing 2.65% of its total area. It borders the municipalities of Dragoman to the north, Kostinbrod to the east, Bozhurishte to the southeast, and Breznik to the southwest, the latter belonging to the Pernik Province.

== Geography ==
The terrain of the municipality is flat, hilly and mountainous. About half of its total area lies within the westernmost reaches of the Sofia Valley, where the municipality’s lowest altitude is situated — 565 m. Southeast of the valley the elevation rises first to low hills and then to the ridges of the low lying mountain range Viskyar, where there highest point of the municipality, the summit of Mechi Kamak (1,077 m), is located.

Slivnitsa Municipality falls within the temperate continental climatic zone with an average temperature of −2.5 °C in January and 18.4 °C in June. Most of its territory is drained by the river Slivnishka reka, a right tributary of the Blato, itself a left tributary of the Iskar of the Danube drainage. In the western parts flows the river Gaberska reka, left tributary of the Nišava. In the north lies the karst Aldomirovtsi Marsh.

== Transport ==
Slivnitsa Municipality is traversed by three roads of the national network with a total length of 48.2 km, including a 13 km section of the Europe motorway (A6) that connects the capital Sofia with the Bulgaria–Serbia border, a 19.6 km stretch of the third class III-811 road, and the first 15.6 km of the third class III-8112 road.

In its southern reaches runs a 14 km section of railway line No. 1 Kalotina–Sofia–Plovdiv–Kapitan Andreevo, and an 11.3 km stretch of No. 12 Aldomirovtsi–Gaber.

== Demography ==
The population is 8,578 as of 2024.

There are 12 villages and one town in Slivnitsa Municipality:

- Aldomirovtsi
- Bahalin
- Barlozhnitsa
- Bratushkovo
- Dragotintsi
- Gurgulyat
- Galabovtsi
- Izvor
- Pishtane
- Povalirazh
- Radulovtsi
- Rakita
- Slivnitsa

== Gallery ==
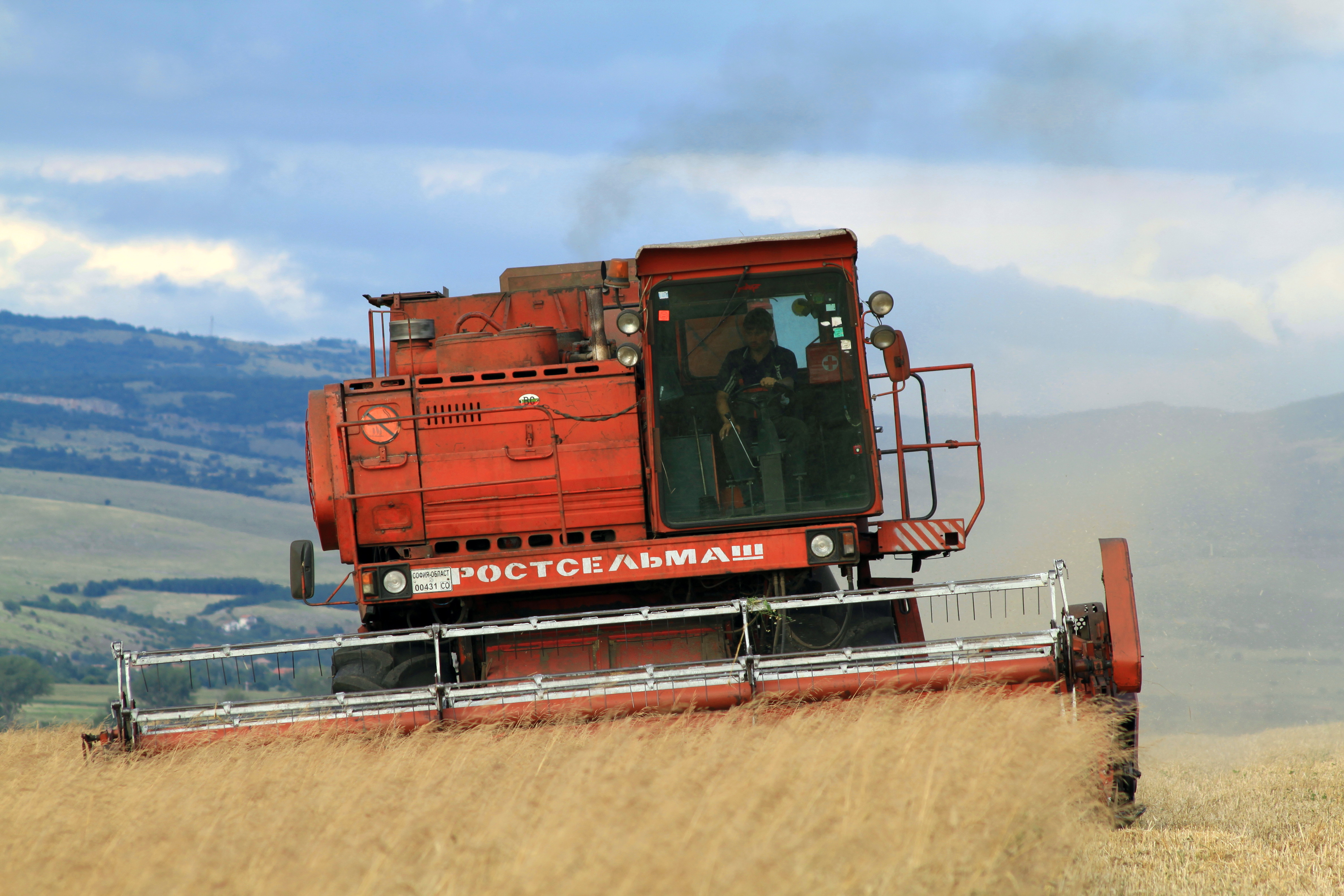
A harvester near Slivnitsa

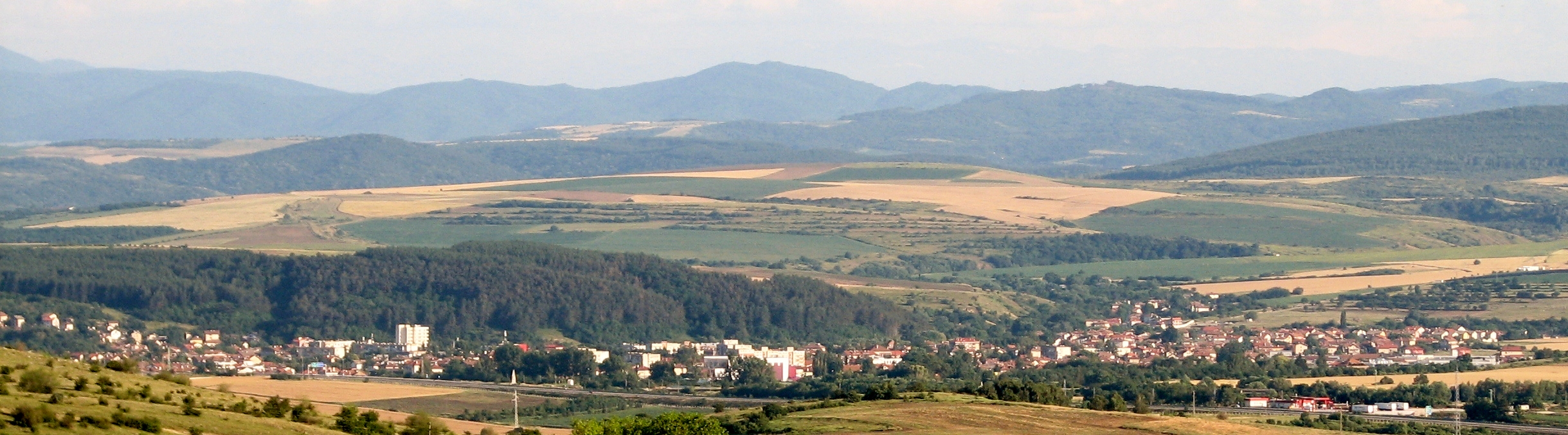
A landscape of Slivnitsa

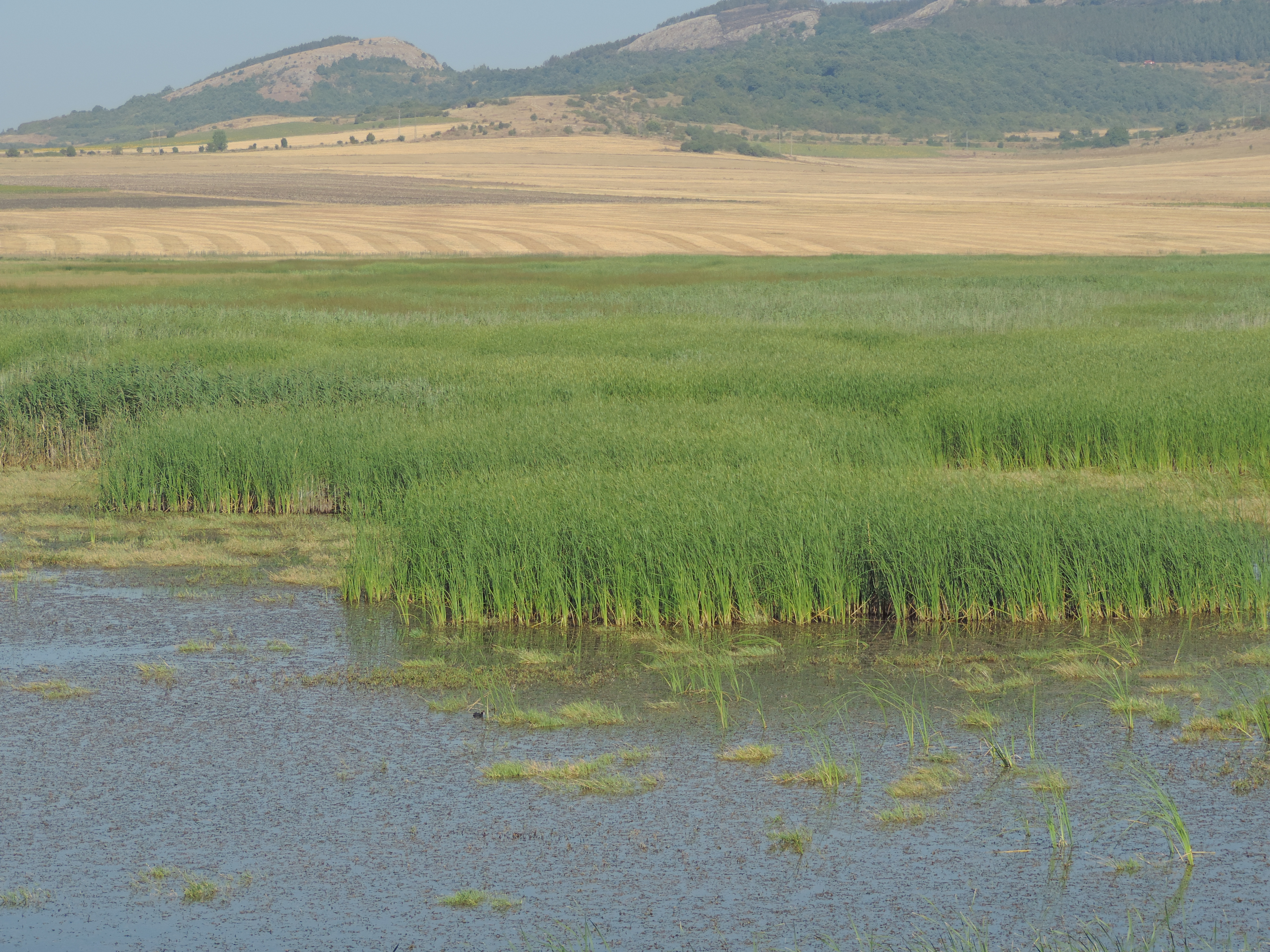
Aldomirovtsi Marsh

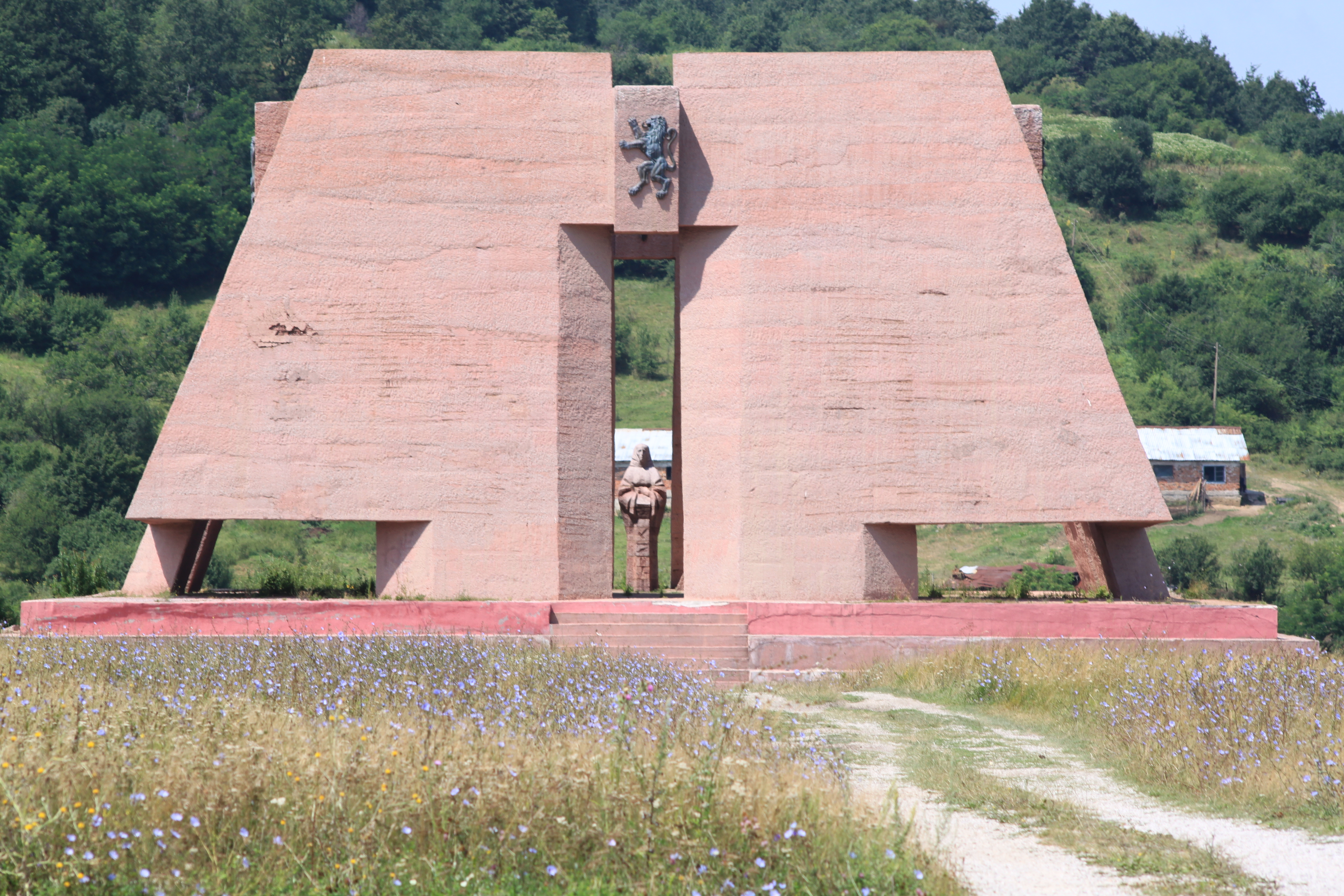
A monument in Gurgulyat dedicated to the victory in the Serbo-Bulgarian War
