= Andrei Bucharestliev =

Bulgarian Lieutenant Colonel

- Андрей Букурещлиев
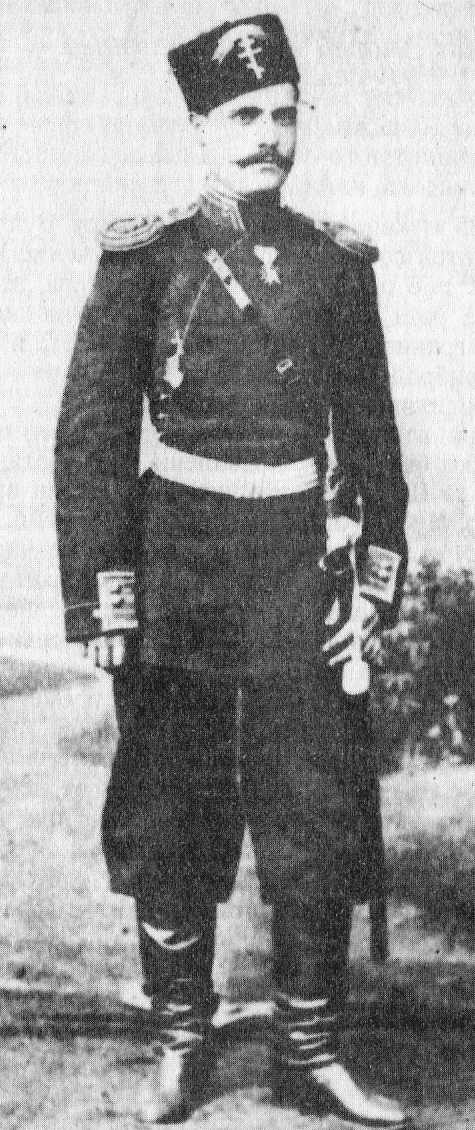
- Born: October 18, 1857; Plevnya, Rumelia Eyalet, Ottoman Empire
- Died: February 13, 1925 (aged 67); Sofia, Sofia City Province, Bulgaria
- Education: Vasil Levski National Military University
- Military career
- Allegiance: Principality of Bulgaria; Kingdom of Bulgaria
- Branch: Bulgarian Land Forces
- Rank: Lieutenant Colonel
- Conflicts: Serbo-Bulgarian War; Battle of Banjski Dol; First Balkan War; Bulgarian front; Second Balkan War; World War I

Andrei Atanasov Bucharestliev was a 19th and 20th century Bulgarian Lieutenant Colonel who was notable for his service in the Battle of Banjski Dol during the Serbo-Bulgarian War.

== Biography ==
Andrei Bucharestliev was born in the village of Plevnya, Drama. Between 1873 and 1876 he studied at the class school in the village of Ilinden by prominent educator Atanas Poppetrov. He graduated from the Vasil Levski National Military University in Sofia with the first class in 1879 and enlisted in the Bulgarian Army. In 1885 he graduated from the shooting school in Moscow.

In Serbo-Bulgarian War, he commanded the militia in the Tsaribrod district, 4th Pleven Infantry Regiment and Dolnonevlyanskiya unit which conceals in the direction to Pirot-Sukovo-Vrabcha-Tran-Breznik. He took part in the battles of Malo Malovo and Banski Dol, both on November 2 and the Battle of Slivnitsa November 5–7. During the Battle of Pirot, the troops commanded by Captain Bucharestliev were in the reserve of the Main Detachment.

After the war, Bucharestliev served in the Vasil Levski National Military University and in 1889 he was dismissed from the army as a district military chief in Burgas. He worked as a public figure and merchant in Plovdiv.

He took part in the First Balkan War, the Second Balkan War and the First World War, after which he was fired in 1920.

Andrei Bukureshtliev is the brother of the composer Angel Bukoreshtliev and the Botev Chetnik Sava Bukureshtliev, the father of the lawyer Atanas Bukureshtliev and the pianist Dora Bukoreshtlieva and the grandfather of the pianist Andrey Bukureshtliev.
