= Aldomirovtsi Marsh =

Karst marsh in western Bulgaria

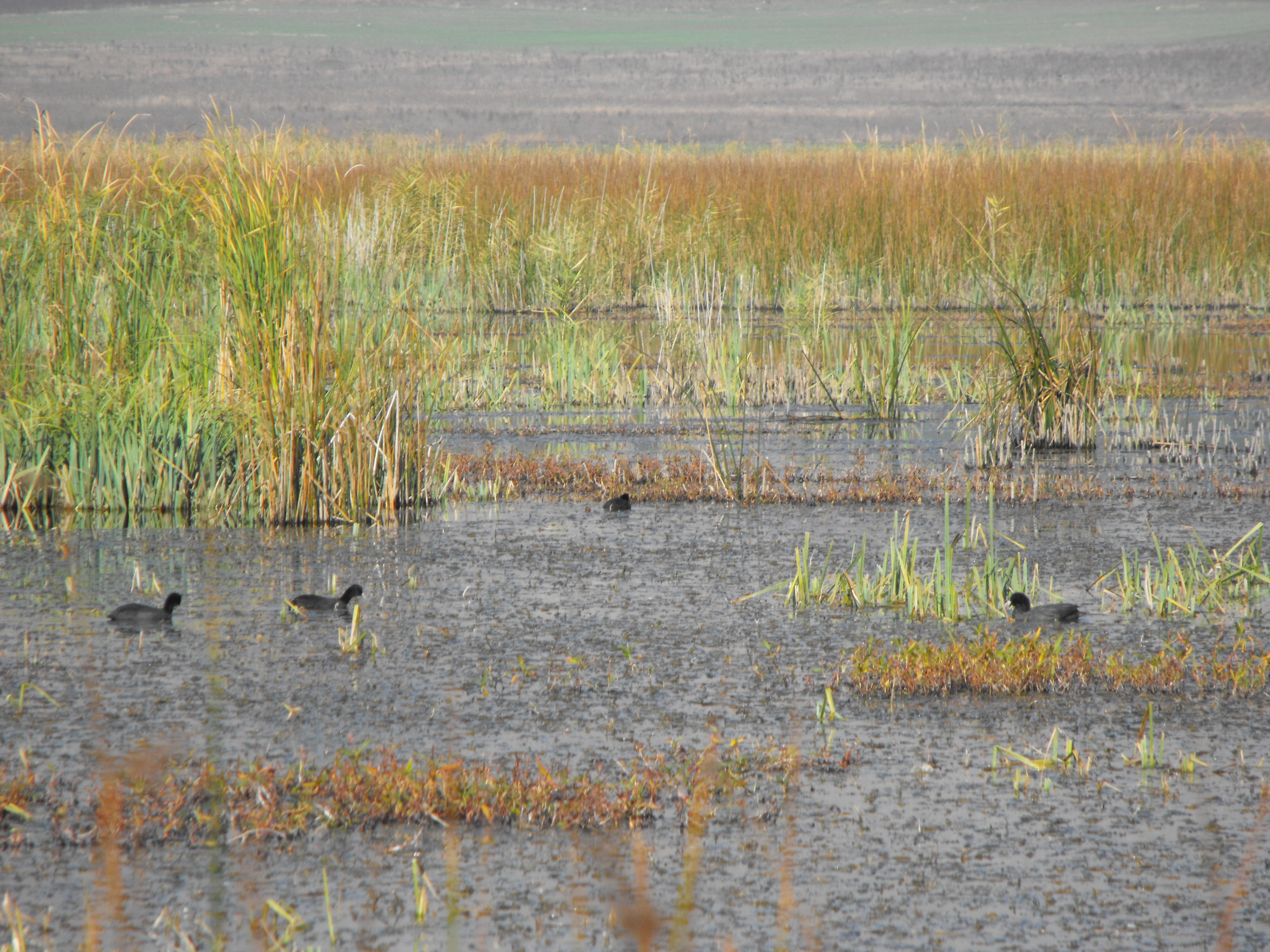

- Location within Bulgaria
- Location: Aldomirovtsi, Sofia Province
- Coordinates: 42°53′28″N 22°59′56″E
- Type: Marsh
- Basin countries: Bulgaria
- Surface area: 129.4 ha (320 acres)

The Aldomirovtsi Marsh (Bulgarian: Алдомировско блато) is a karst marsh in western Bulgaria near the town of Slivnitsa. In 1989 the marsh was designated a protected area in order to preserve the natural habitat of rare species of waterfowl and 40 species of higher plants.

== Description ==
The marsh is situated in the westernmost reaches of the Sofia Valley, 5 km north-west of the town of Slivnitsa and 1 km north of the village of Aldomirovtsi near European route E80. It is located not far from the Serbian border (28 km), and 30 km from capital city Sofia. The Aldomirovtsi Marsh covers an area of 129.4 ha.

Near the marsh are the localities Meka Crev and Tri Ushi–- a scene of the bloody battle of Slivnitsa in November 1885 during the Serbo-Bulgarian War when the Bulgarians decisively defeated a Serbian invasion.

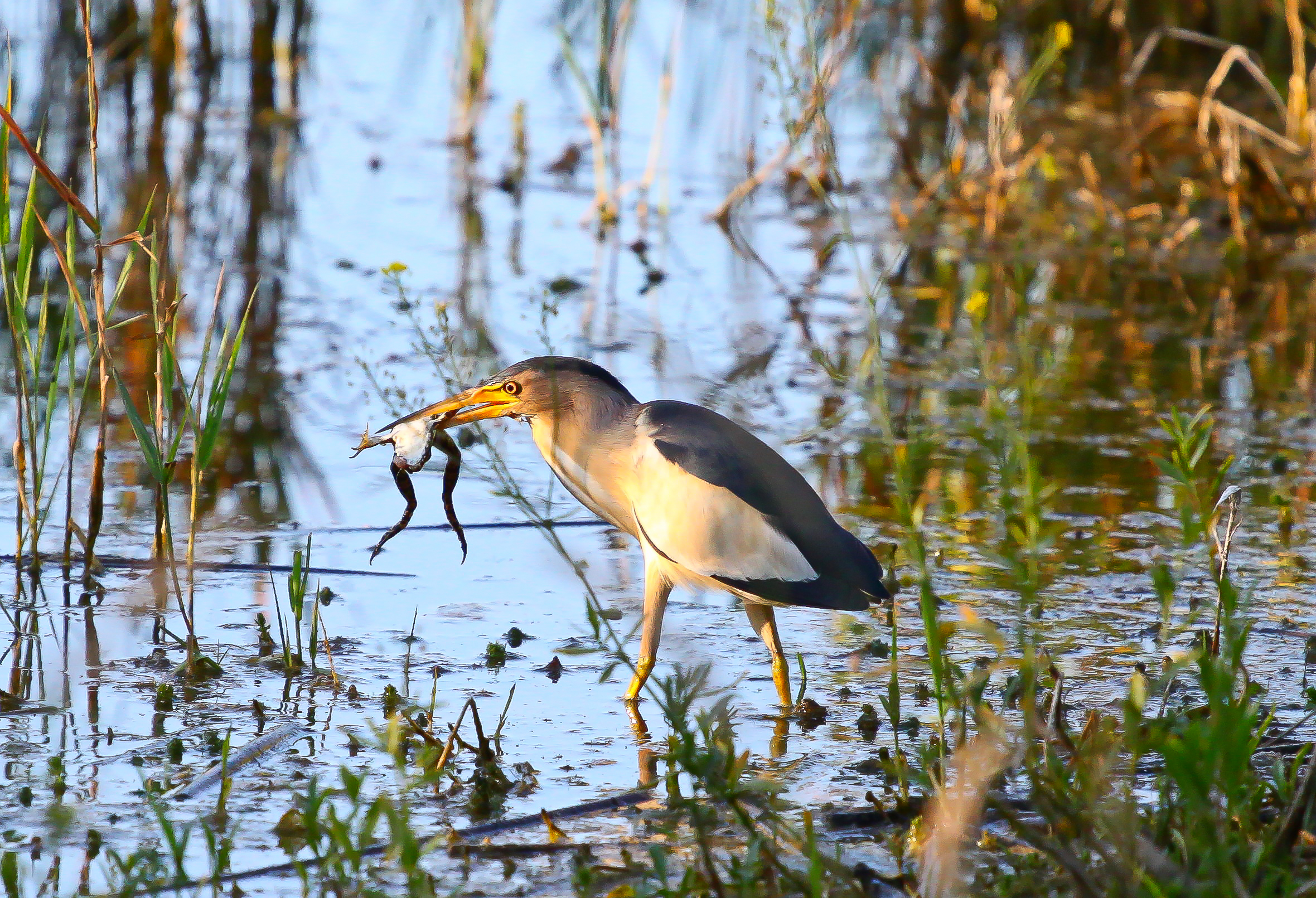
Little bittern in the Aldomirovtsi Marsh

The marsh used to be a popular destination for anglers due to the large specimen of northern pike, common carp and the introduced grass carp. The record for a grass carp fished by angle was set there in 1982 –- 22.7 kg.

The Aldomirovtsi Marsh is home to many nesting and wintering bird species, including ruff, great crested grebe, little grebe, black-necked grebe, white stork, water rail, little gull, common redshank, little egret, little bittern, short-toed snake eagle, etc.

== Drying problems and recovery ==
The marsh has a variable water regime and irregular shape. Its area increases in spring and almost dries in summer and autumn. The marsh had dried completely twice, in 1991 and 2012. In May 2012, immediately after the 2012 Pernik earthquake, the marsh began to rapidly dry up until it disappeared completely in July 2013. The cause was a shift of the earth layers of the local karst rocks in the aftermath of the earthquake.

In 2014 experts from Slivnitsa Municipality and environmentalists discovered that the water of the marsh was draining in a ponor. The ponor was sealed with clay and concrete and since the autumn of 2014 the Aldomirovtsi Marsh has recovered.

== See also ==
- Geography of Bulgaria
- Dragoman Marsh
- List of protected areas of Bulgaria
- List of lakes in Bulgaria

== Sources ==
- Мичев(Michev), Николай (Nikolay); Михайлов (Mihaylov), Цветко (Tsvetko); Вапцаров (Vaptsarov), Иван (Ivan); Кираджиев (Kiradzhiev), Светлин (Svetlin) (1980). Географски речник на България (Geographic Dictionary of Bulgaria) (in Bulgarian). София (Sofia): Наука и изкуство (Nauka i izkustvo).
