= Gurgulyat =

Village in Slivnitsa Municipality, Sofia Province, Bulgaria

Gurglyat Гургулят
- Village
- Location within Bulgaria
- Elevation: 812 m (2,664 ft)

Population (2024)
  - Total: 43

Gurgulyat (Bulgarian: Гургулят) is a village in Slivnitsa Municipality, Sofia Province, located in western Bulgaria approximately 10 km south of the town of Slivnitsa.

As of September 2005, the village had a population of 40 which had a slight increase to 43 as of 2024. It is located at 42°47′N 22°59′E, 812 m above sea level in the Viskyar Mountain.

The village is famous for its role in the Serbo-Bulgarian War (1885–1886) when the Bulgarian Army, which was aided by local residents, prevented the Serbs from reaching Slivnitsa. Most of the village's historical landmarks are dedicated to this event, such as the imposing 20 m-high red-concrete Pantheon-Monument in the Tsarkvishte (Църквище) locality, which features a sculpture of Mother Bulgaria and has an area of around 700 m^{2}.

Other landmarks include the small (60 m-long) gorge of the local river known for its sheer rocks, a fortress and a cave.

== Honour ==
Gurgulyat Peak on Graham Land in Antarctica is named after the village.

== Gallery ==
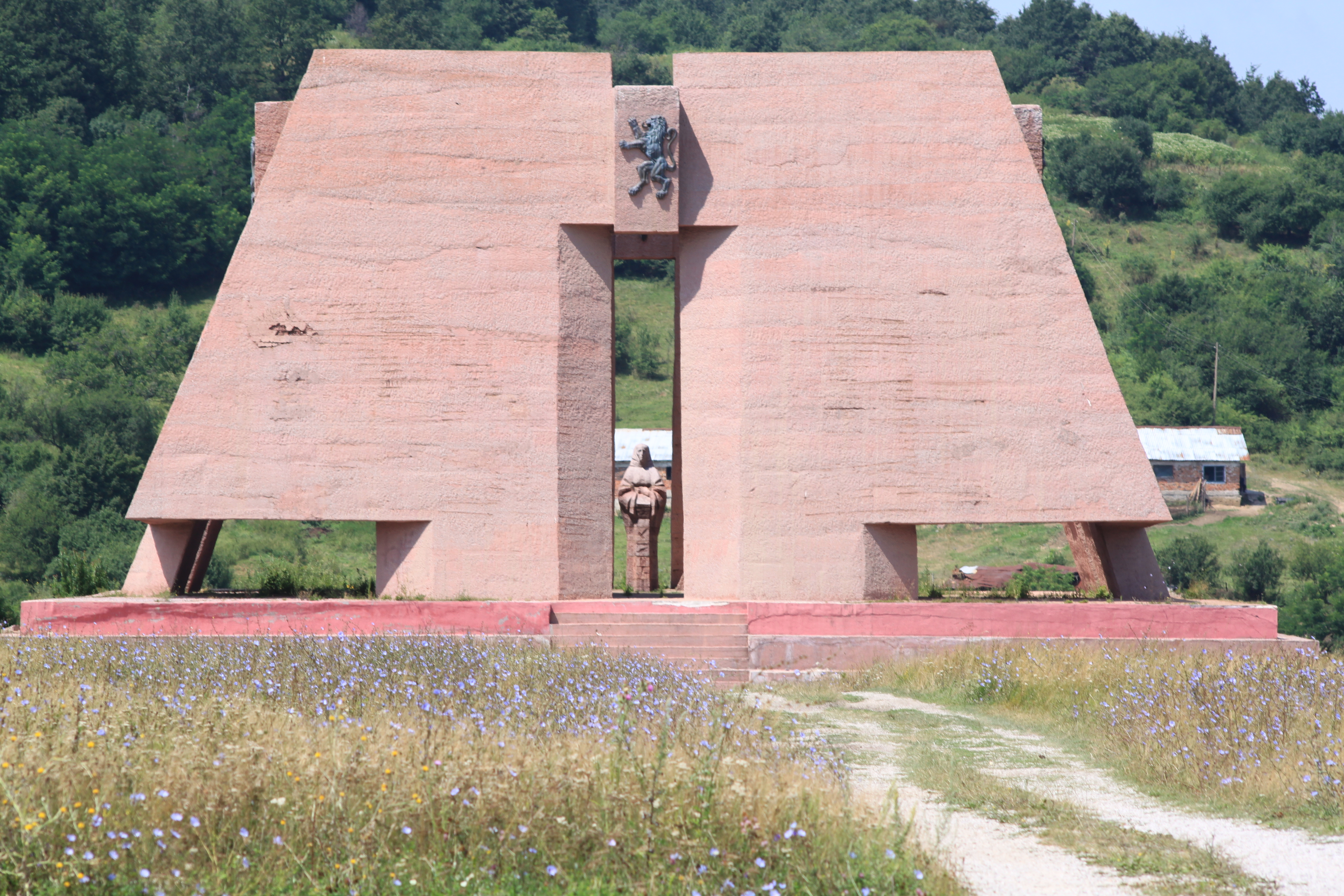
Monument-Pantheon

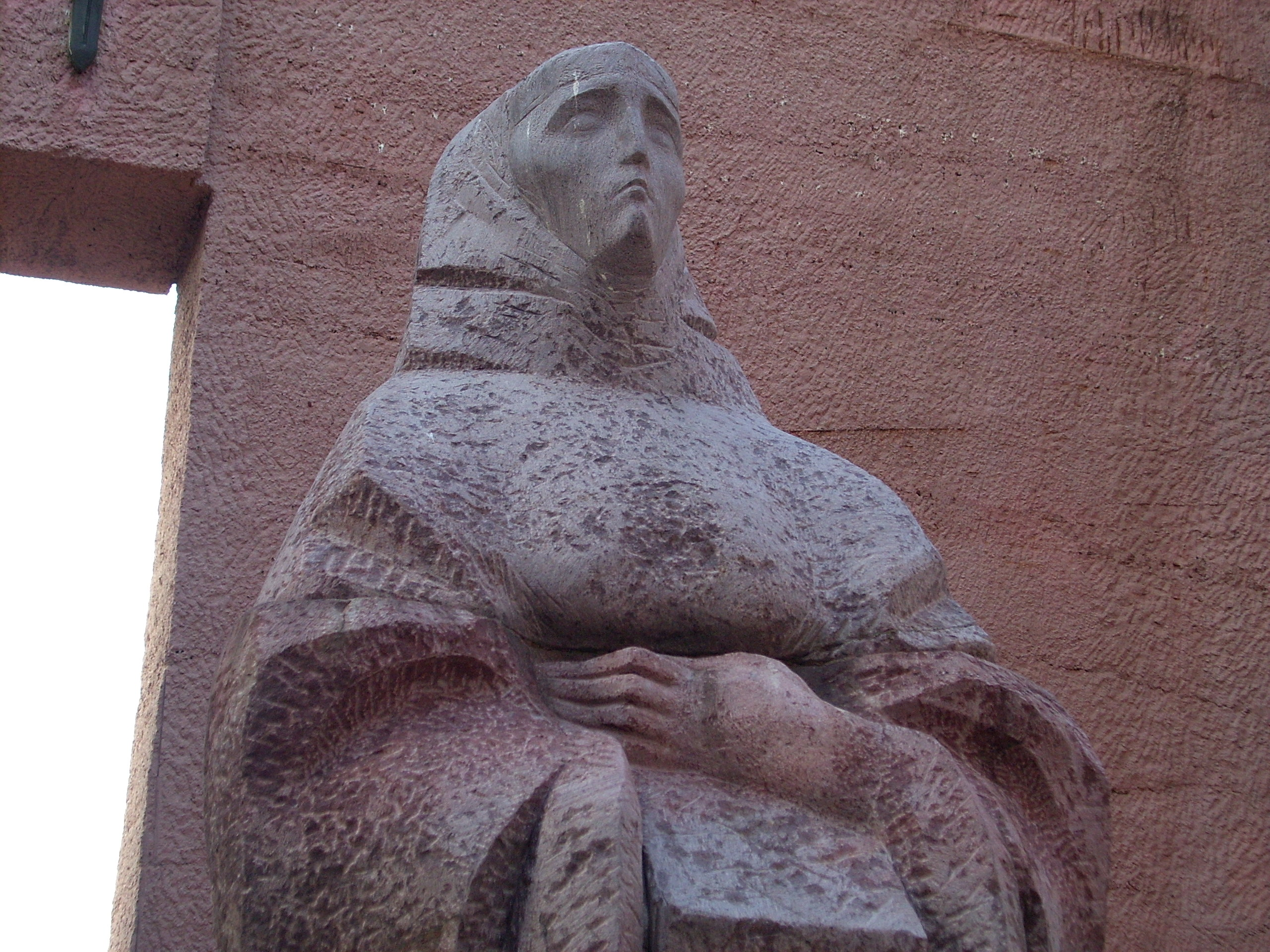
Monument-Pantheon

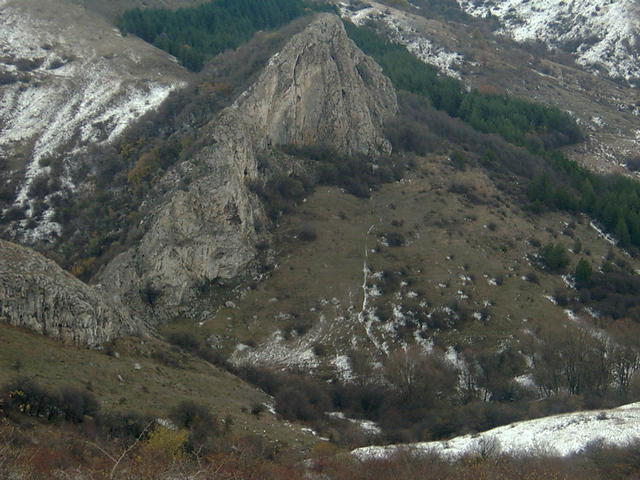
Surrounding area

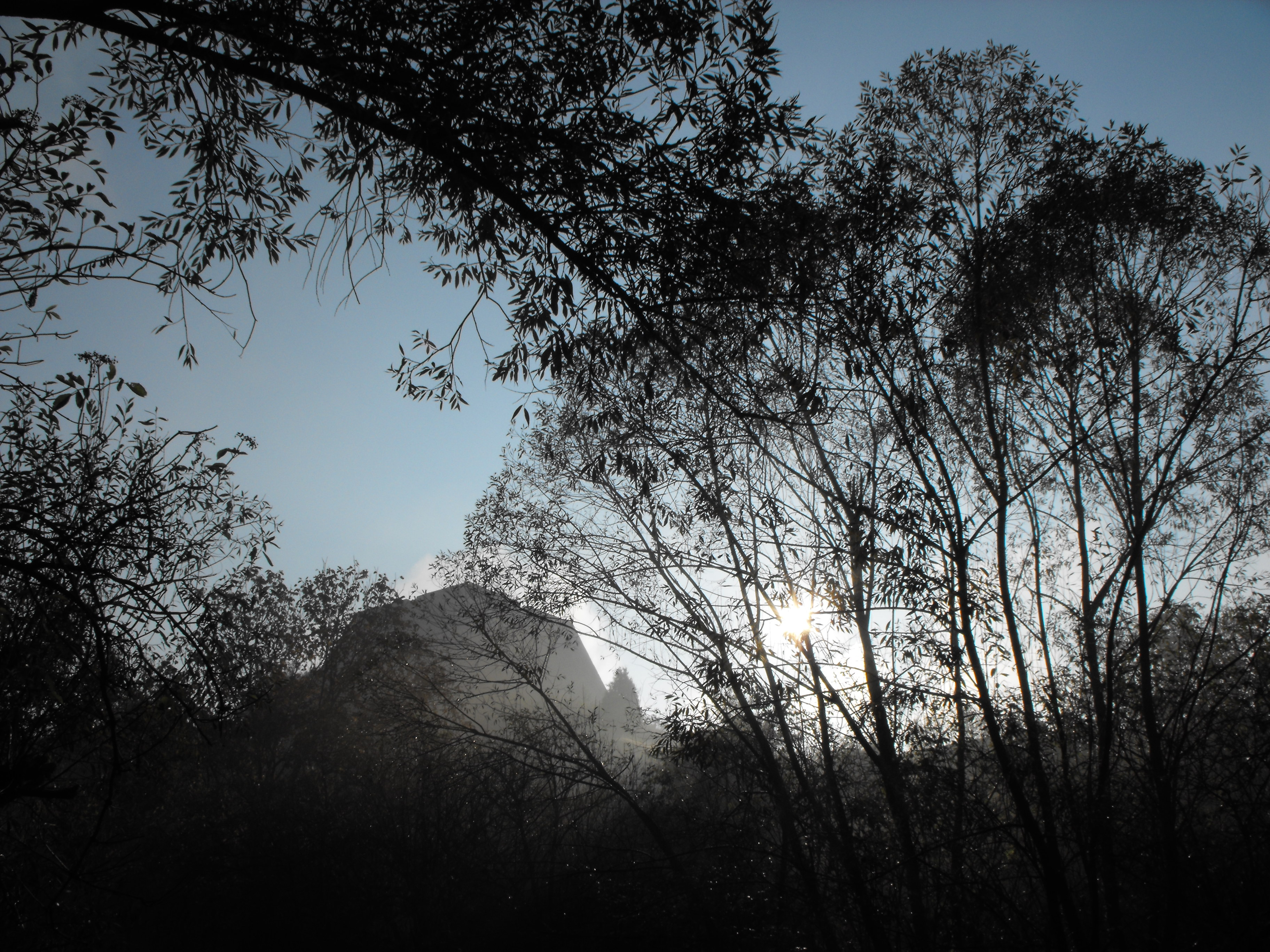
