= Malo Malovo =

Malo Malovo Мало Малово
- Village
- Location within Bulgaria
- Coordinates: 42.9500°N 23.0500°E
- Country: Bulgaria
- Province: Sofia Province
- Municipality: Dragoman
- Time zone: UTC+2 (EET)
  - Summer (DST): UTC+3 (EEST)

Malo Malovo is a village in Dragoman Municipality, Sofia Province, western Bulgaria.
