= Vishan, Sofia Province =

Vishan Вишан
- Village
- Location within Bulgaria
- Coordinates: 42.9381°N 22.7942°E
- Country: Bulgaria
- Province: Sofia Province
- Municipality: Dragoman
- Time zone: UTC+2 (EET)
  - Summer (DST): UTC+3 (EEST)

Vishan is a village in Dragoman Municipality, Sofia Province, western Bulgaria.
