= Aldomirovtsi =

Village in Bulgaria

Coordinates: 42°51′N 22°59′E

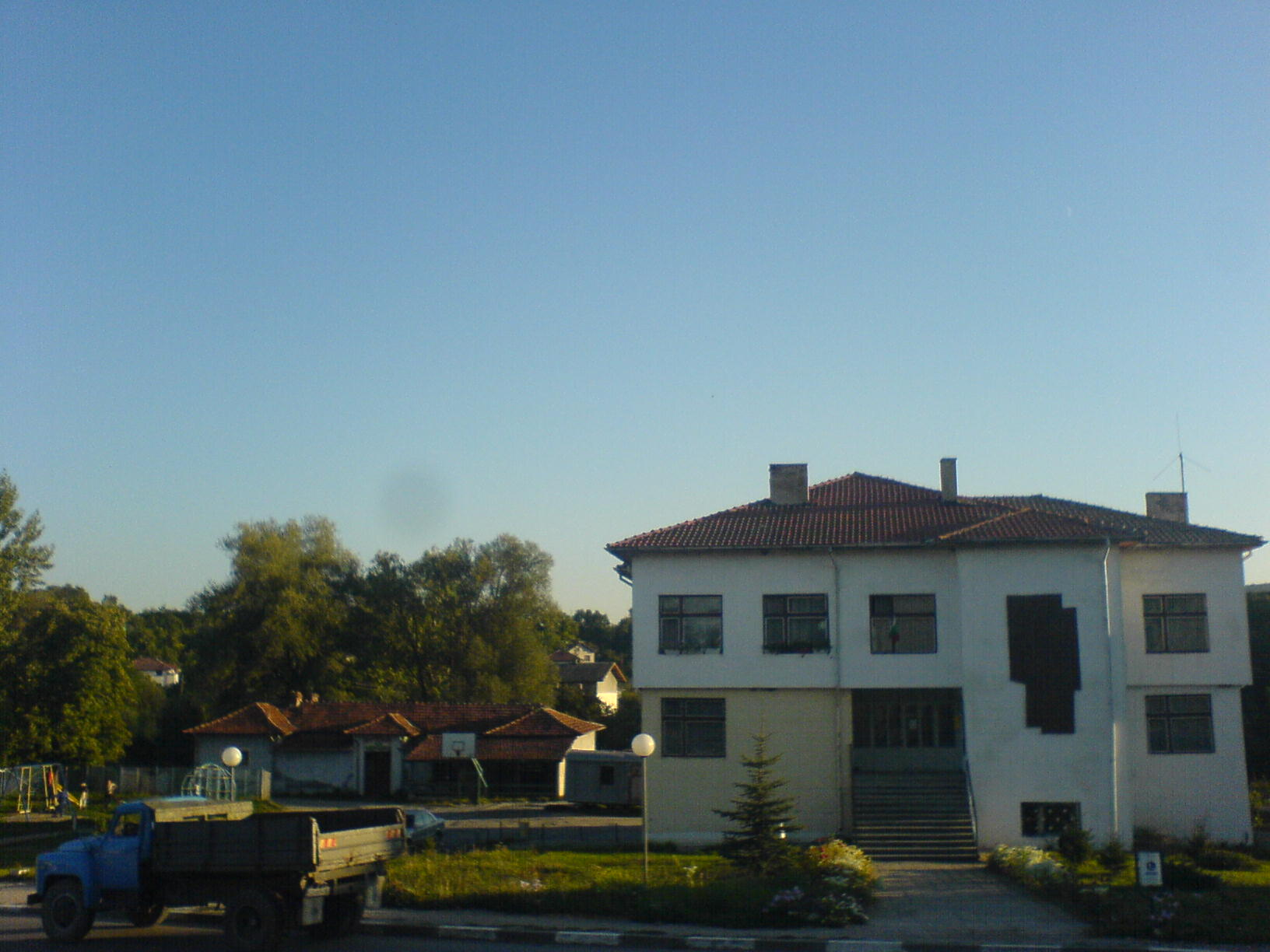
The municipal building, 2007

Aldomirovtsi (Bulgarian: Алдомировци [aɫˈdɔmiroft͜si]) is a village in Slivnitsa Municipality, Sofia Province, in western Bulgaria approximately 36 km (22 mi) from Sofia.

Aldomir Ridge in Antarctica is named after the village.

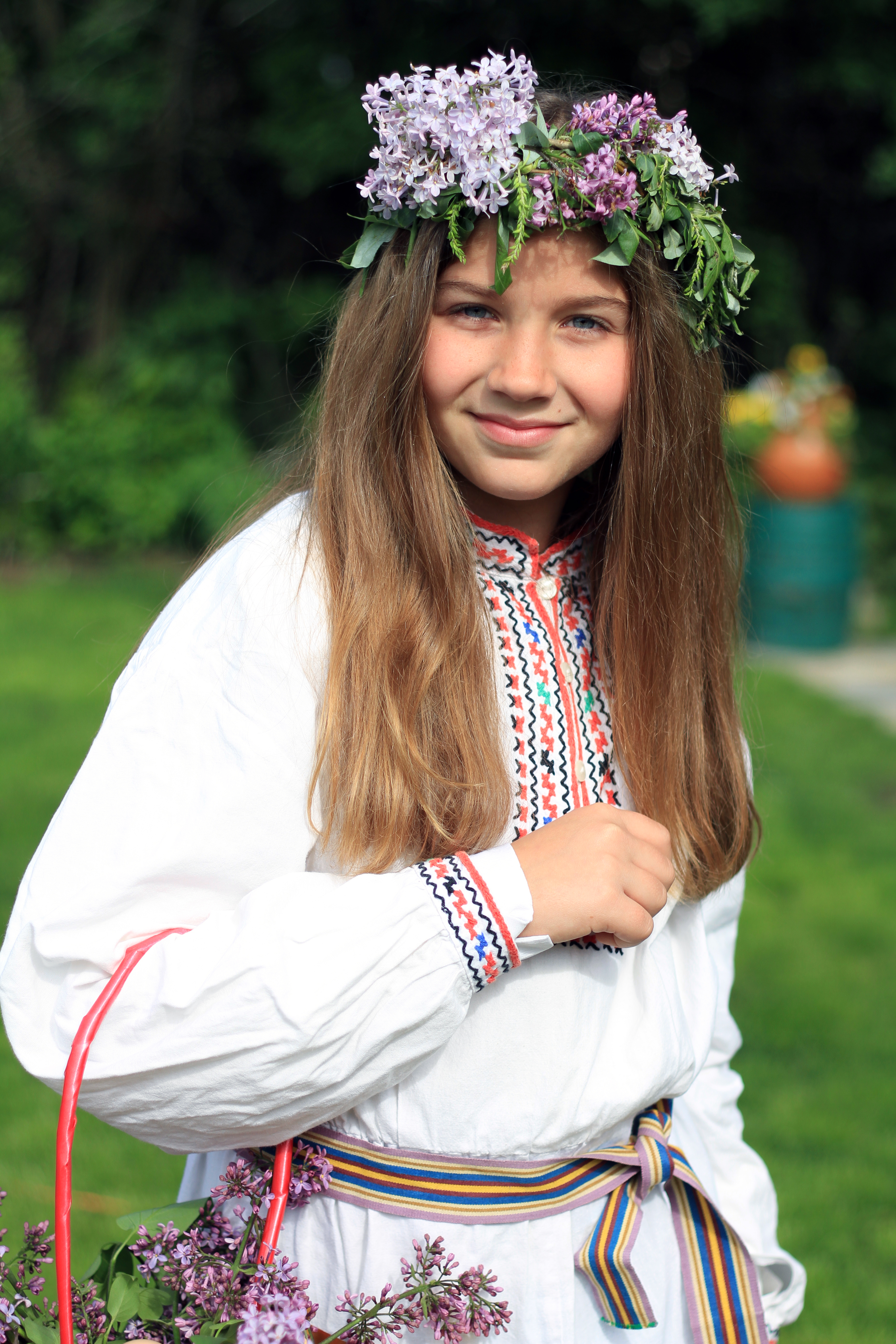
Lazarka from village of Aldomirovtsi, Bulgaria

== See also ==
- Slivnitsa
- Aldomirovtsi Marsh
