= Bahalin =

Village in western Bulgaria

Coordinates: 42°53′00″N 22°55′00″E

Bahalin (Bulgarian: Бахалин) is a small village in Slivnitsa Municipality, Sofia Province, located in western Bulgaria approximately 10 km (6.2 mi) northwest of the town of Slivnitsa.
