= Izvor, Sofia Province =

Village in western Bulgaria

Coordinates: 42°52′N 22°55′E

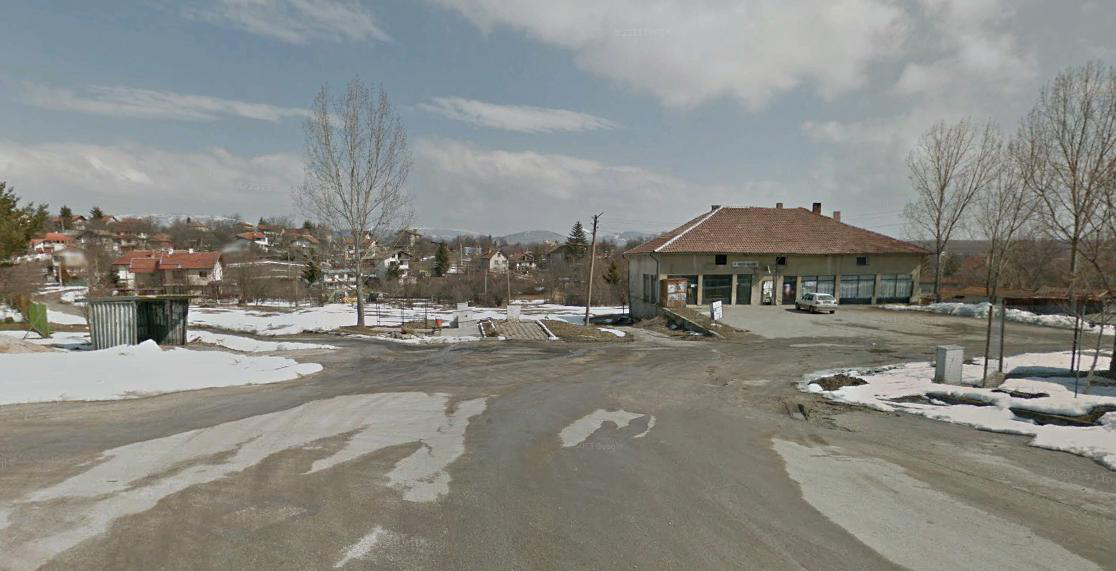
- Central square of Izvor
- Interactive map of Izvor, Sofia Province

Izvor (Bulgarian: Извор) is a village in Slivnitsa Municipality, Sofia Province, located in western Bulgaria approximately 10 km (6.2 mi) west of the town of Slivnitsa.
