= Barlozhnitsa =

Village in western Bulgaria

Coordinates: 42°51′00″N 22°57′00″E

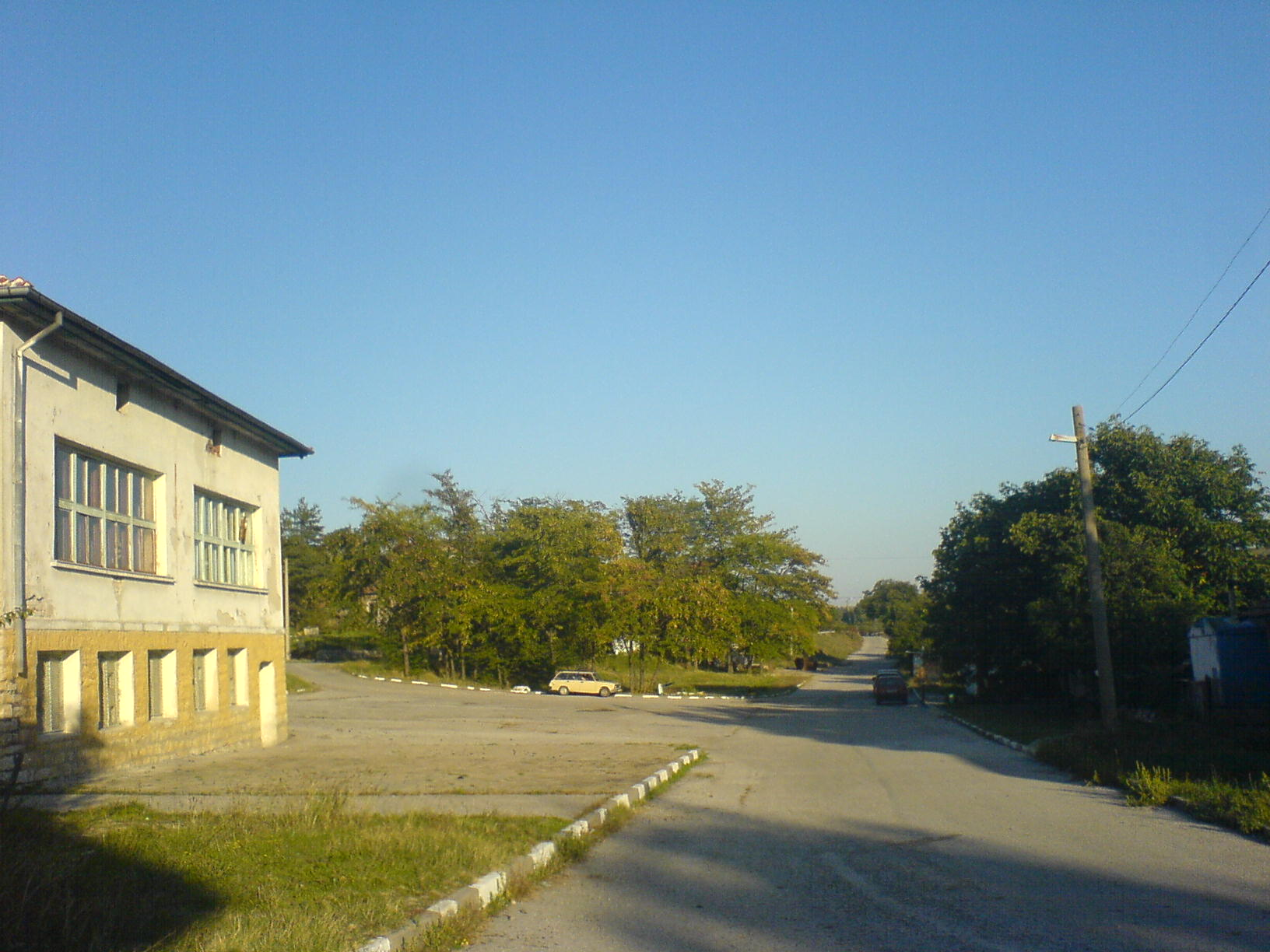
Barlozhnitsa

Barlozhnitsa (Bulgarian: Бърложница) is a small village in Slivnitsa Municipality, Sofia Province, located in western Bulgaria, approximately 12 km west of the town of Slivnitsa.
