= Željuša =

Željuša Жељуша
- Village
- Location within Serbia
- Coordinates: 43°00′N 22°43′E
- Country: Serbia
- Region: Southern and Eastern Serbia
- District: Pirot
- Municipality: Dimitrovgrad

Population (2002)
  - Total: 1,394
- Time zone: UTC+1 (CET)
  - Summer (DST): UTC+2 (CEST)

Željuša is a village in the municipality of Dimitrovgrad, Serbia. According to the 2002 census, the village has a population of 1394 people. It is located just west from Lukavica, close to the Bulgarian border.
