= Vlasi =

Vlasi Власи
- Village
- Location within Serbia
- Coordinates: 42°59′55″N 22°37′59″E
- Country: Serbia
- Region: Southern and Eastern Serbia
- District: Pirot
- Municipality: Pirot
- Elevation: 1,854 ft (565 m)

Population (2011)
  - Total: 42
- Time zone: UTC+1 (CET)
  - Summer (DST): UTC+2 (CEST)

Vlasi is a village in the municipality of Pirot, Serbia. According to the 2011 census, the village has a population of 42 people.
