= Rakita, Sofia Province =

Coordinates: 42°47′00″N 22°56′00″E

Rakita (Bulgarian: Ракита) is a village in Slivnitsa Municipality, Sofia Province, located in western Bulgaria approximately 15 km west of the town of Slivnitsa.
