= Bratushkovo =

Bratushkovo Братушково
- Location of Bratushkovo
- Coordinates: 42°50′N 22°58′E
- Country: Bulgaria
- Provinces (Oblast): Sofia

Government
  - Mayor: Georgi Georgiev
- Elevation: 644 m (2,113 ft)

Population (2005)
  - Total: 47
- Time zone: UTC+2 (EET)
  - Summer (DST): UTC+3 (EEST)
- Postal Code: 2222
- Area code: 07177
- License plate: B

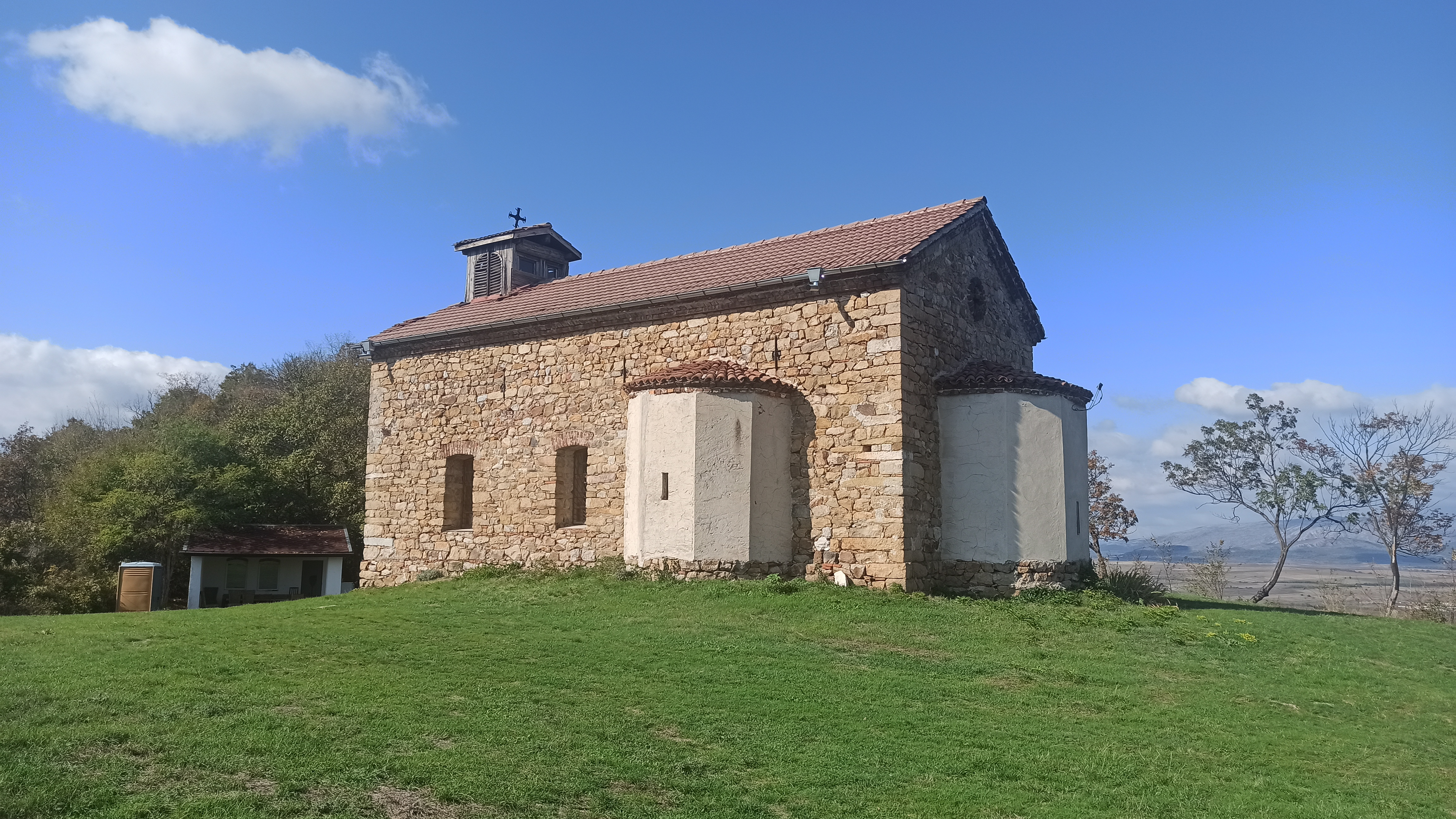
The Church of St. Elijah in the village of Bratushkovo,

Bratushkovo (Bulgarian: Братушково) is a village in Slivnitsa Municipality, Sofia Province, located in western Bulgaria approximately 8 km (5.0 mi) south-west of the town of Slivnitsa.

The village was first mentioned in Ottoman tax registers of 1576 as Bratkovitsa. The name is derived from the personal name Bratushko or Bratko.
