= Donja Nevlja =

Dolna Nevlya Доња Невља
- Village
- Location within Serbia
- Coordinates: 42°55′45″N 22°45′34″E
- Country: Serbia
- Region: Southern and Eastern Serbia
- District: Pirot
- Municipality: Dimitrovgrad

Population (2002)
  - Total: 31
- Time zone: UTC+1 (CET)
  - Summer (DST): UTC+2 (CEST)

Dolna Nevlya Долна Невля
- Village
- Location within Bulgaria
- Coordinates: 42°55′45″N 22°45′34″E
- Country: Bulgaria
- District: Sofia District
- Municipality: Dragoman

Population (2014)
  - Total: 2
- Time zone: UTC+1 (CET)
  - Summer (DST): UTC+2 (CEST)

Donja Nevlja is a village in the municipality of Dimitrovgrad, Serbia and in municipality of Dragoman, Bulgaria. According to the 2002 Serbian census, the village has a population of 31 people. It is split along the Serbian - Bulgarian border. According to the 2014 data of the Bulgarian Citizen Registry, the village has a population of 2
