= Radulovtsi =

Village in western Bulgaria

Coordinates: 42°50′N 22°56′E

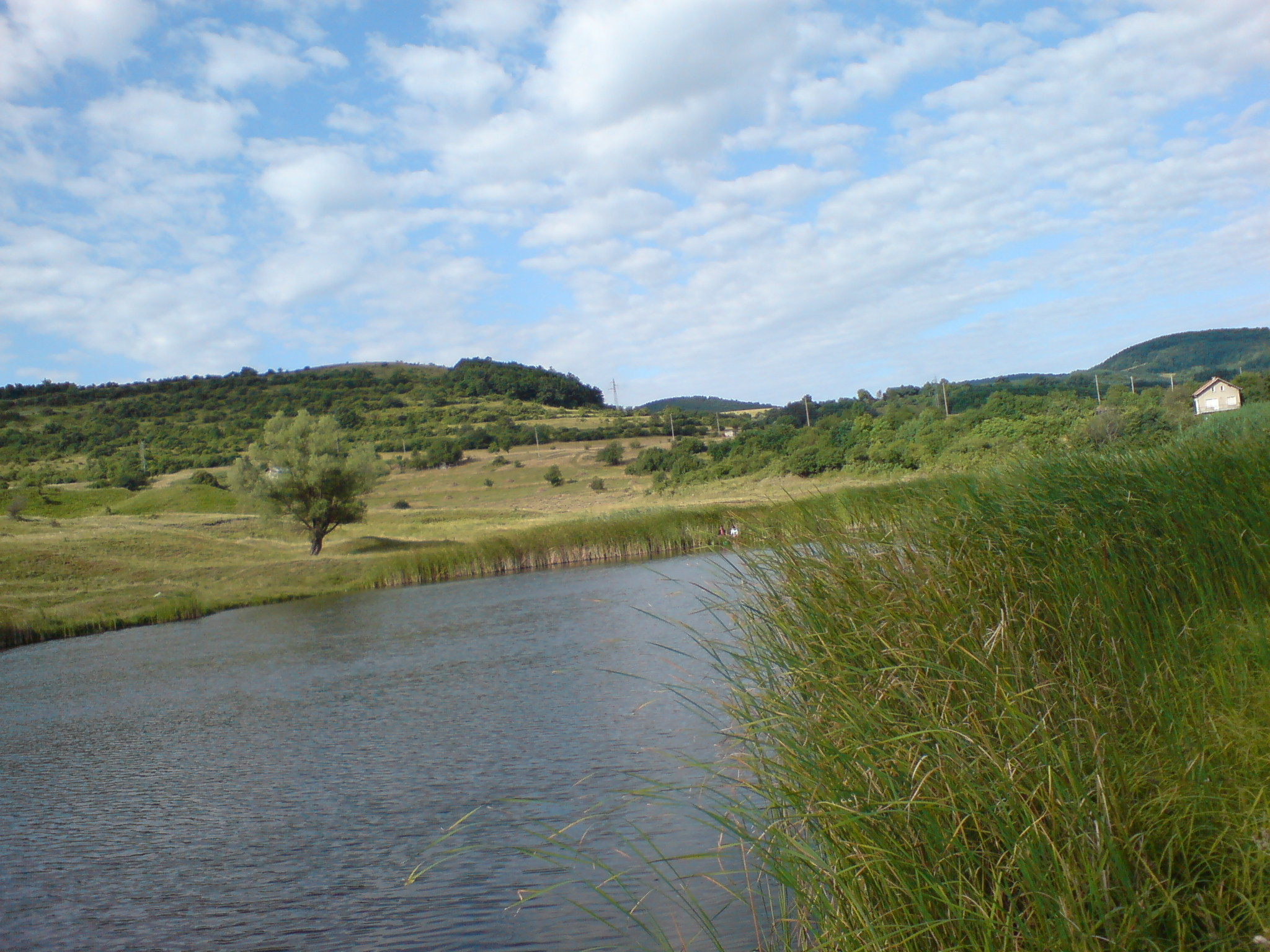
Lake "Water world", near village Radulovtsi, in 2009

Radulovtsi (Bulgarian: Радуловци) is a village in Slivnitsa Municipality, Sofia Province, located in western Bulgaria approximately 12 km south-west of the town of Slivnitsa.
