= Galabovtsi =

Village in Slivnitsa Municipality, Sofia Province, Bulgaria

Coordinates: 42°48′35″N 23°0′32″E

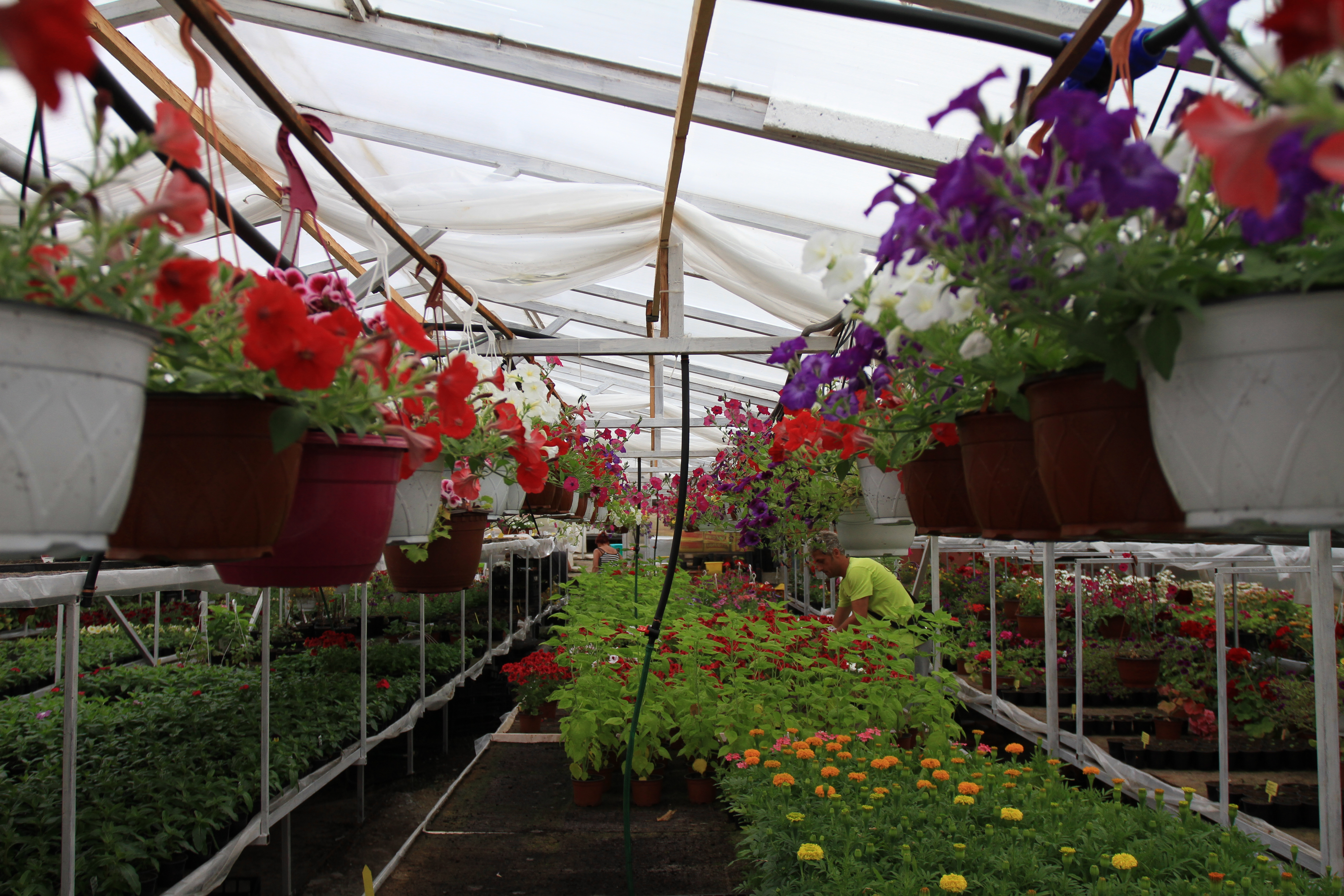
Flowers in Galabovtsi, Bulgaria

Galabovtsi (Bulgarian: Гълъбовци) is a village in Slivnitsa Municipality, Sofia Province, located in western Bulgaria approximately 7 km south of the town of Slivnitsa.
