= Lukavica (Dimitrovgrad) =

Lukavica Лукавица
- Village
- Location within Serbia
- Coordinates: 42°59′56″N 22°46′20″E
- Country: Serbia
- Region: Southern and Eastern Serbia
- District: Pirot
- Municipality: Dimitrovgrad

Population (2002)
  - Total: 429
- Time zone: UTC+1 (CET)
  - Summer (DST): UTC+2 (CEST)

Lukavica is a village in the municipality of Dimitrovgrad, Serbia. According to the 2002 census, the village has a population of 429 people.
