= Dragotintsi =

Village in western Bulgaria

Coordinates: 42°51′N 22°54′E

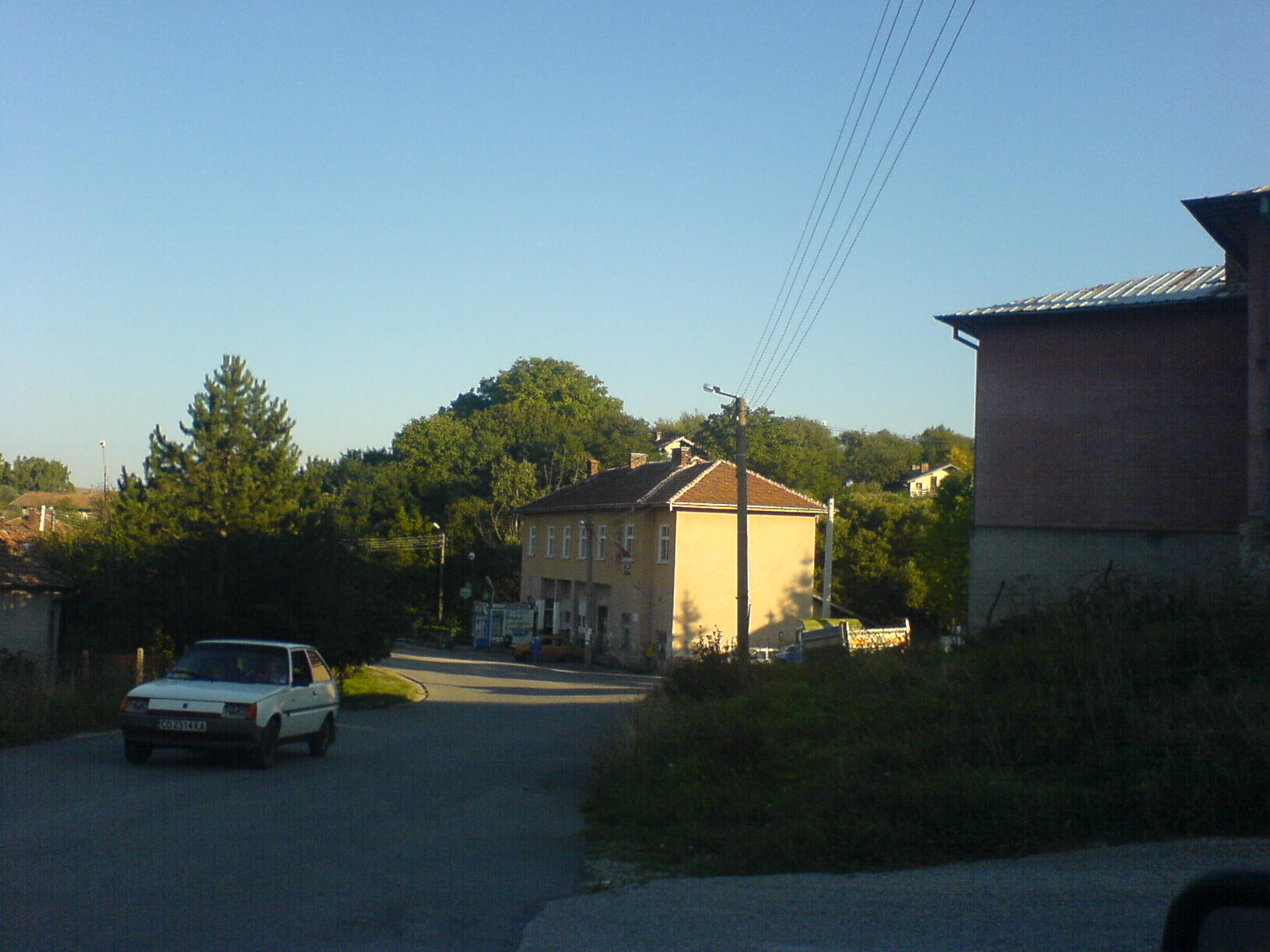
Dragotintsi in 2007

Dragotintsi (Bulgarian: Драготинци) is a village in Slivnitsa Municipality, Sofia Province, located in western Bulgaria approximately 15 km west of the town of Slivnitsa.

The village was first mentioned in an Ottoman tax register of 1576 as Dragotinche or Diragotinche. Its name is derived from the personal name Dragota.
