= Pishtane =

Village in western Bulgaria

Coordinates: 42°49′N 22°52′E

Pishtane (Bulgarian: Пищане) is a small village in Slivnitsa Municipality, Sofia Province, located in western Bulgaria 14 km south-west of the town of Slivnitsa.
