= Povalirazh =

Bulgarian village

Coordinates: 42°50′00″N 22°54′00″E

Povalirazh (Bulgarian: Повалиръж [povaˈliˌrɤʃ]) is a small village in Slivnitsa Municipality, Sofia Province, located in western Bulgaria approximately 15 km south-west of the town of Slivnitsa. The village's name was first attested in 1576. It is a formation of the imperative povalí ("bring down") and the common noun razh ("rye"), i.e. semantically "a place where rye is grown".
