= Tvarditsa =

Tvarditsa may refer to:

- Tvarditsa, Sliven Province, capital of Tvarditsa Municipality, Bulgaria
- Tvarditsa, Burgas Province, Bulgaria
- Tvarditsa, Dobrich Province, Bulgaria
- Tvarditsa Municipality, Bulgaria
- Tvardița, town in Moldova
- Tvarditsa Rocks, off the South Shetland Islands, Antarctica
