= Zhrebchevo Reservoir =

Reservoir in Sliven and Stara Zagora Provinces, Bulgaria

Zhrebchevo Dam
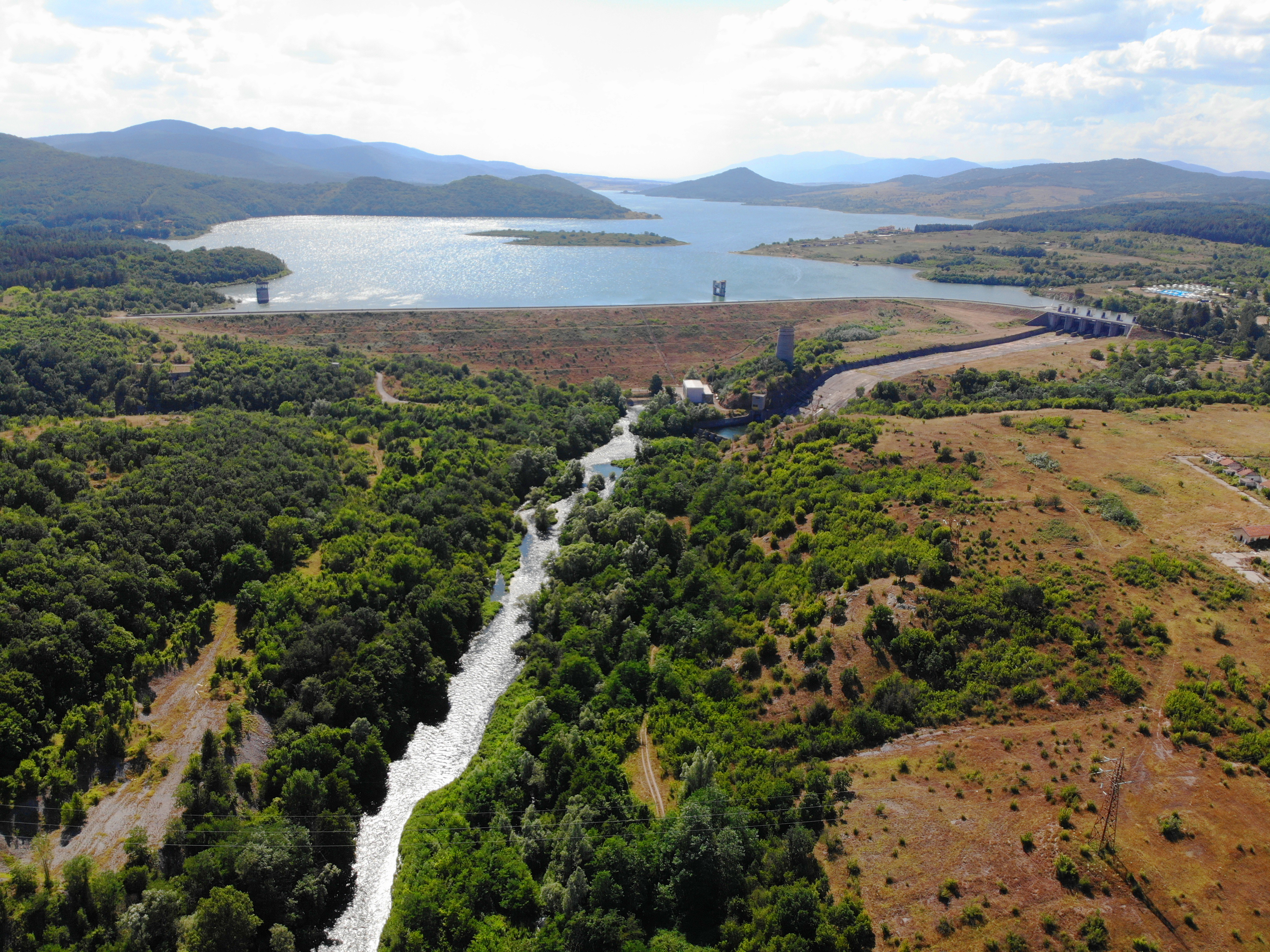

- Location of Zhrebchevo Reservoir in Bulgaria
- Official name: Язовир Жребчево (Bulgarian)
- Location: Kazanlak Valley
- Coordinates: 42°35′44.9″N 25°55′41.08″E
- Construction began: 1959
- Opening date: 1966

Dam and spillways
- Height: 48 m (157 ft)

Reservoir
- Creates: Zhrebchevo Reservoir
- Total capacity: 400,000,000 m^{3} (320,000 acre⋅ft)
- Surface area: 25 km^{2} (6,200 acres)

Power Station
- Installed capacity: 15.4 MW
- Annual generation: 32 GWh

Zhrebchevo Reservoir (Bulgarian: Язовир Жребчево) is a large dam and reservoir in central Bulgaria, situated between the Sub-Balkan valleys of Kazanlak and Tvarditsa that lie between the Balkan Mountains to the north and the Sredna Gora mountain range to the south. Administratively, the reservoir is located in the municipalities of Gurkovo and Nikolaevo of Stara Zagora Province and Tvarditsa and Nova Zagora of Sliven Province. Close to its shores are the towns of Gurkovo and Nikolaevo, as well as the villages of Panicherevo, Banya, and Asenovets.

== History and geography ==
The dam was constructed between 1959 and 1966 on the river Tundzha, the longest tributary of the Maritsa. Its main purpose is to level the river discharge and to provide water for irrigation in the northeastern parts of the Upper Thracian Plain, as well as to the Sliven Valley and Yambol Field. Part of the water is used for industrial water supply. Zhrebchevo Reservoir is owned by the state company "Irrigation Systems". The reservoir has an area of 25 km^{2} and a volume of 400 million m^{3}.

In the dam wall is located the small Zhrebchevo Hydro Power Plant with installed capacity of 15.4 MW, powered with two Francis turbines. On average the power plant processes 332 million m^{3} of water and produces 32.6 GWh annually. It is owned by Minstroy Holding JSC.

== Landmarks and fishing ==
Zhrebchevo Reservoir flooded the former villages of Zhrebchevo, Zapalnya and Dolno Panicherevo. In its northeastern part are located the semi-submerged ruins of the 19th century Church of St John of Rila, the only remaining structure of Zapalnya. The iconostasis, the bell and part of the inventory were moved to churches in nearby villages. The church is accessible for a walk in summer, when the water level drops.

Due to its irregular shape, the reservoir has many arms and inlets with convenient fishing spots. It contains numerous native fish species including the European perch, zander, wels catfish, northern pike, Eurasian carp, crucian carp, Prussian carp, Common bream, Danube bleak, and common rudd, as well as alloctonous ones like the grass carp.

== Gallery ==
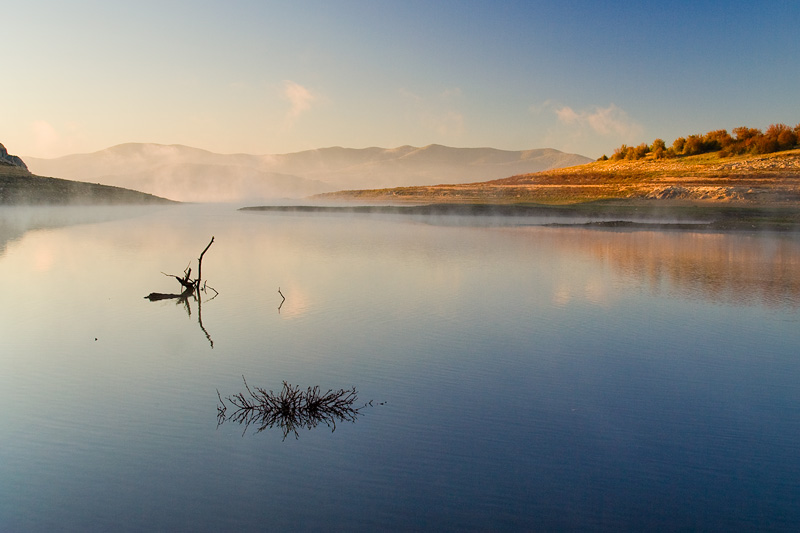
A view of the reservoir

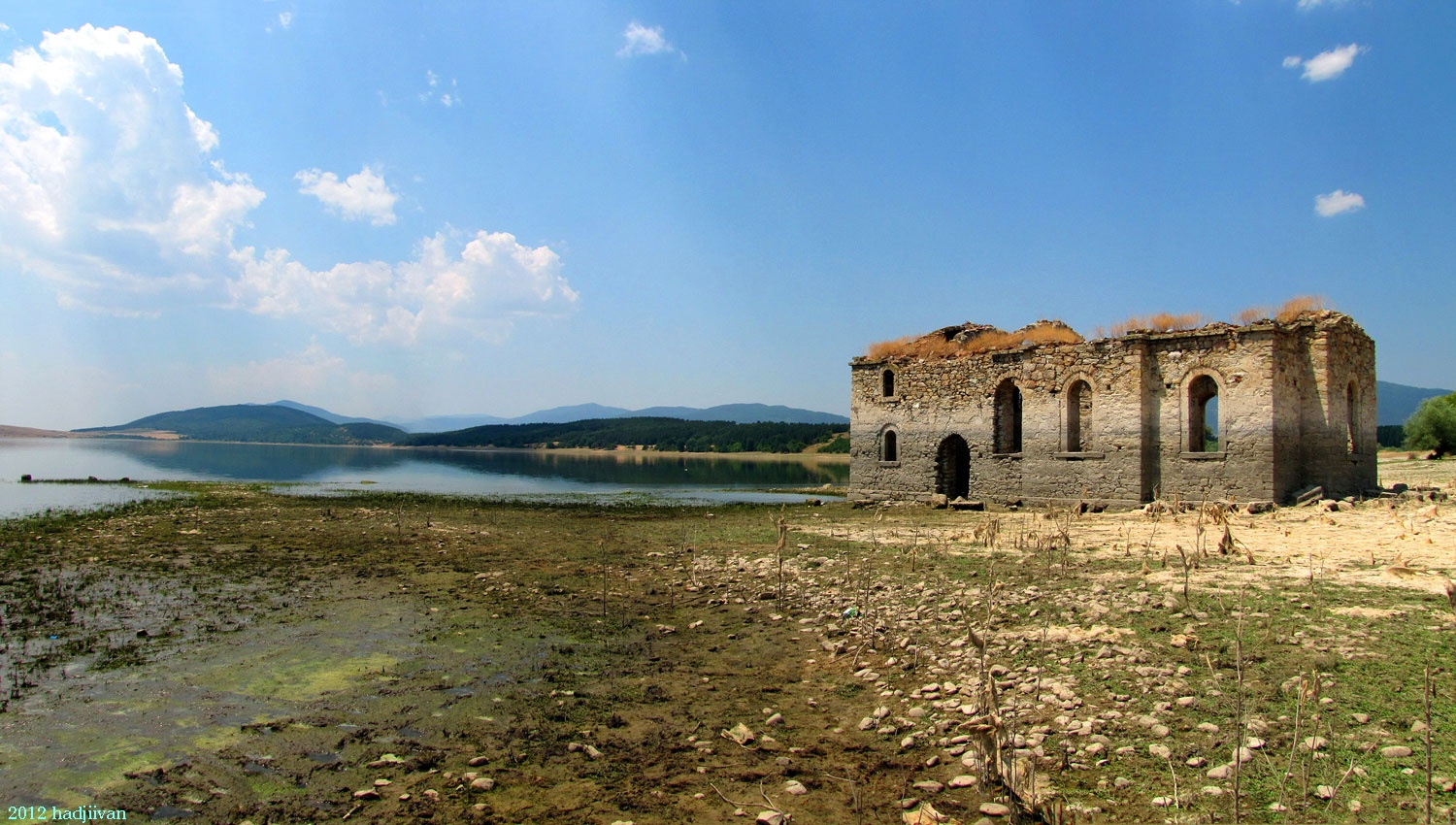
The submerged church

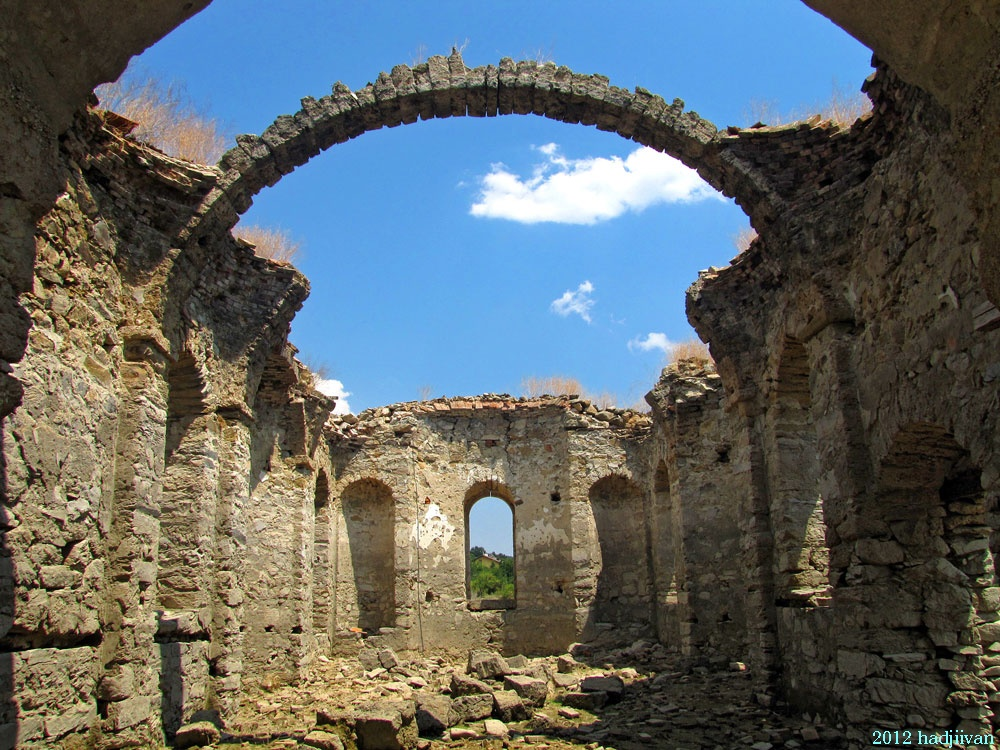
The submerged church, interior
