= Kazanlak Valley =

Valley in Bulgaria

- Valley
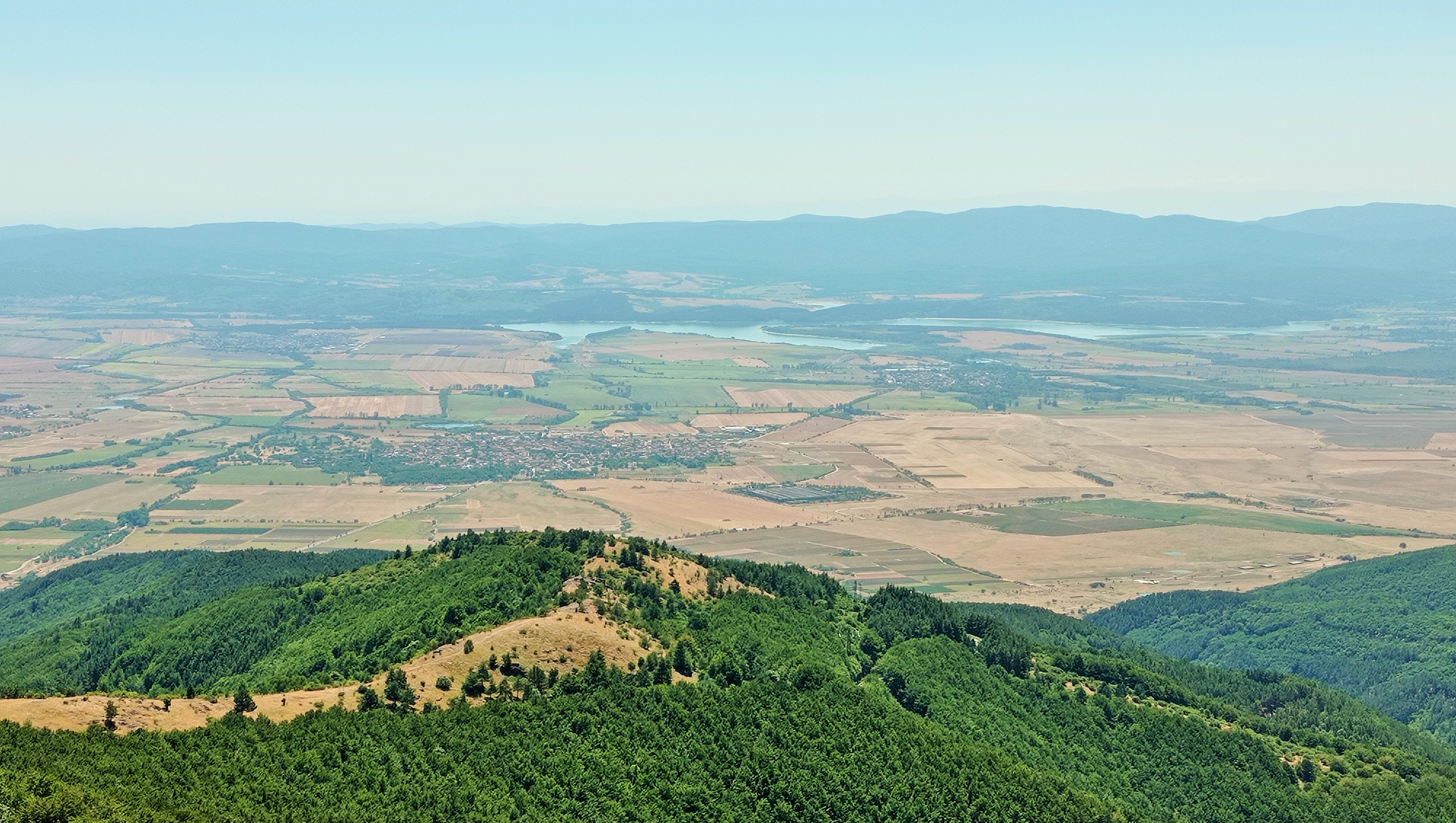
- The valley seen from the summit of Shipka
- Interactive map of Kazanlak Valley
- Coordinates: 42°35′0″N 25°32′42″E
- Location: Bulgaria

Area
  - Total: 780 km^{2} (300 sq mi)

Dimensions
  - Length: 70 km (43 mi)
  - Width: 12 km (7.5 mi)

Kazanlak Valley (Bulgarian: Казанлъшка котловина) is situated in central Bulgaria. Named after the town of Kazanlak, its main settlement, it is the seventh of the eleven Sub-Balkan valleys in direction west–east. Together with the neighbouring Karlovo Valley, it forms part of the Rose Valley region. Due to the high concentration of ancient Thracian monuments, including the UNESCO World Heritage Site the Tomb of Kazanlak, it is also known as the Valley of the Thracian Rulers.

== Geography ==
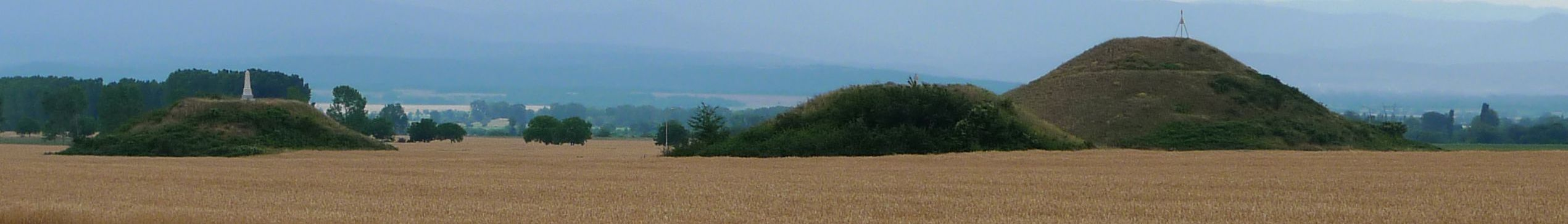
Thracian burial mounds and wheat field in Kazanlak Valley

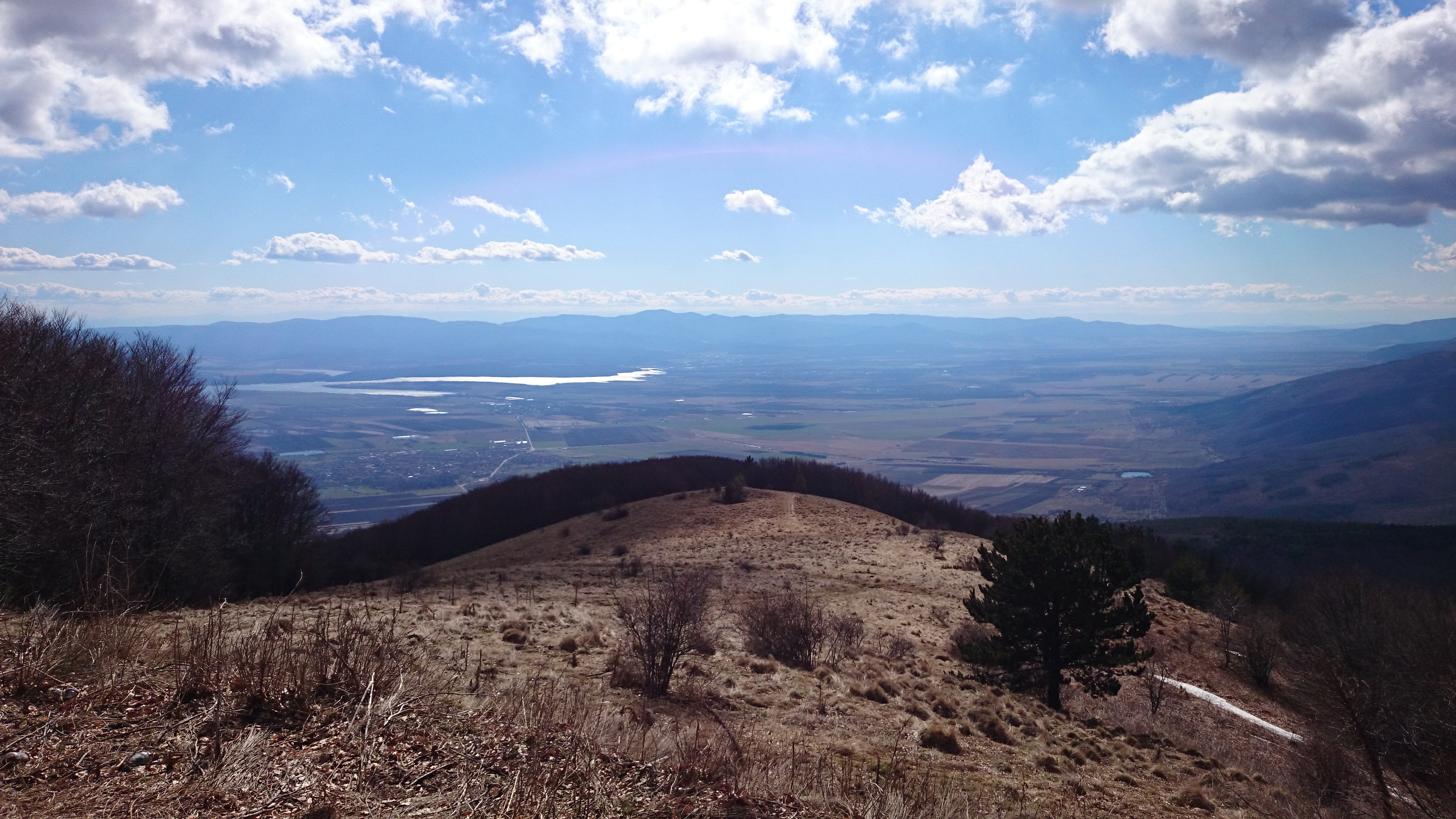
The valley seen from the summit of Buzludzha

The valley is enclosed between the Triglav, Shipka and Tryavna divisions of the Balkan Mountains to the north and the Sarnena Serdna Gora division of the Sredna Gora mountain range to the south. The Strazhata Ridge (610 m) separates it from the higher Karlovo Valley to the west, while the Yamurdzha Height (433 m) and the Mezhdenik Ridge (604 m) form the divide with the Tvarditsa Valley further the east.

It spans a territory of 780 km^{2}, making the third largest among the Sub-Balkan valleys after the ones of Sofia and Sliven. It reaches a length of about 70 km in direction west–east; the width is 10–12 km. The average altitude is about 350 m with inclination in eastern direction.

Geologically, the Kazanlak Valley is a tectonic depression that sank during the Neogene and Quaternary periods. It consists of two grabens — Sheynovo in the west and Kazanlak in the east, separated by a low transverse threshold running north–south. The western part is narrower and has a rather hilly surface with numerous alluvial cones formed by the rivers flowing from the Balkan Mountains. The altitude in the western zone reaches 400–500 m. The eastern part is more extensive, flatter, and much lower, in places below 200 m.

The entire basin is filled with Neogene–Quaternary sediments with a thickness of up to 600 m. At the foothills of the Balkan Mountains, the Quaternary sedimentation consists of a thick layer of deluvial–proluvial debris. The slopes of the Balkan Mountains are steep, with exposed Paleozoic crystalline rocks, granites, Triassic and Upper Cretaceous sediments, partially deforested and heavily eroded. The slopes of the Sredna Gora mountain range are low and gentle, composed of granites.

The valley is in the transitional zone between the temperate continental climatic zone and the continental Mediterranean zone. It is characterized by milder winters, relatively few days with snow cover, shallower snow depth, low absolute minimum temperatures, and relatively lower winter precipitation. Summers are moderately warm, with high summer precipitation. Compared with the Upper Thracian Plain to the south, summers are relatively cooler and not as dry. The second half of summer and early autumn are characterized by prolonged droughts. The mean annual temperature is 10.7 °C with average January temperature of –0.5 °C and average July temperature of 21.8 °C.

The valley is drained by the river Tundzha of the Maritsa drainage and several of its tributaries, including the Tazha, Turiyska reka, Gabrovnitsa, Eninska reka, Maglizhka reka, Vetrenska reka, etc. In its central part is located the Koprinka Reservoir and in the easternmost reaches is the Zhrebchevo Reservoir, both on the Tundzha. There are mineral springs at Pavel Banya, Yagoda and Ovoshtnik.

== History and archaeology ==
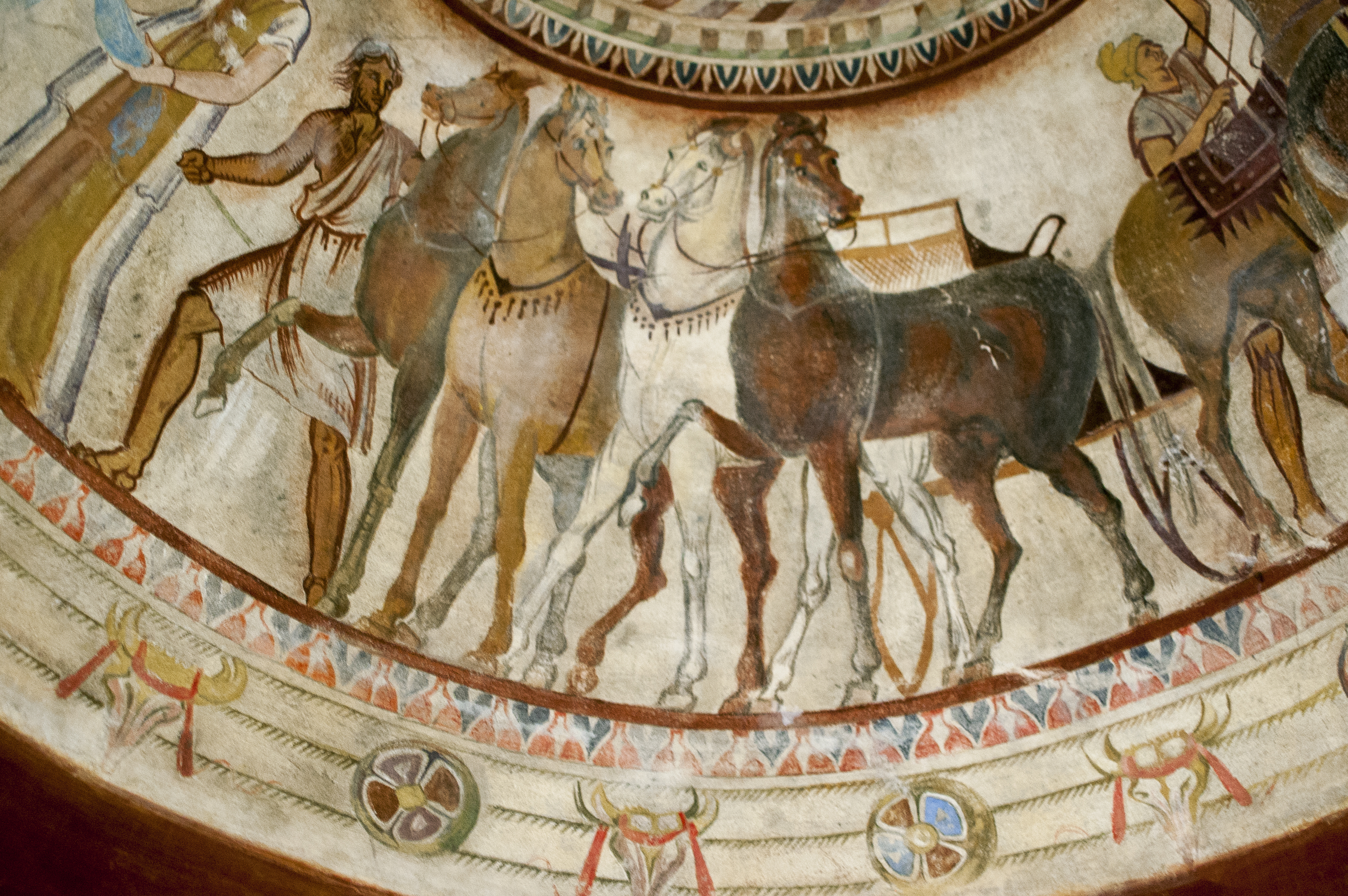
Frescoes in the Thracian Tomb of Kazanlak

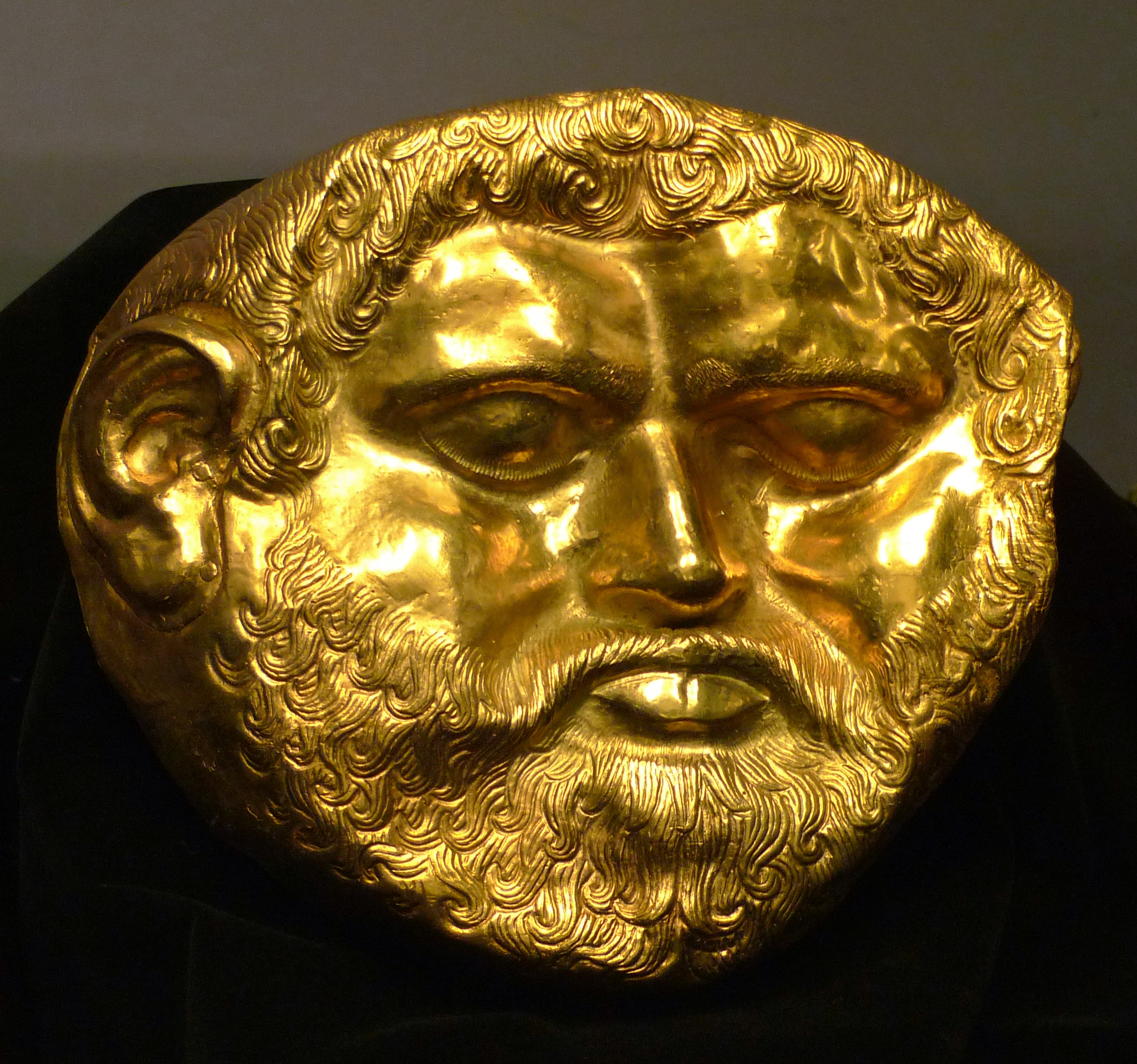
The golden mask of Teres I, found in the valley

The valley had been continuously inhabited since at least 10,000 years. During the antiquity it became a prominent center of Thracian politic and culture. It its western–central part was located the ancient city of Seuthopolis, founded in 325–315 BC by Seuthes III as the capital of the Odrysian kingdom. There are over a thousand mounds from that period scattered across the region, hence the name the Valley of the Thracian Rulers. The most remarkable of these is the Thracian Tomb of Kazanlak, inscribed as one of the 10 UNESCO World Heritage Sites in Bulgaria due to the well-preserved frescoes depicting scenes from Thracian life. During the 1990s and early 2000s many remarkable Thracian tombs were discovered in the valley, including Ostrusha, Golyama Arsenalka, Helvetia, Griffins, Shushmanets, the Tomb of Seuthes III, etc. Many treasures and artifacts were discovered during excavations in the region, such as the golden mask of Teres I, the bronze head of Seuthes III, gold wreaths.

In the Middle Ages the area was part of the First and Second Bulgarian Empire. The town of Kran in particular rose to prominence in the 13th–14th centuries as the center of an influential province of the empire, first mentioned as such in the 1230 Dubrovnik Charter of the Bulgarian emperor Ivan Asen II. It was the seat of the noble Aldimir (fl. 1280–1305), brother of emperor George I Terter, who had significant role in Bulgarians politics at the time. The valley was eventually conquered by the Ottoman Turks in the aftermath of the Bulgarian–Ottoman wars in the late 14th century. During the Bulgarian National Revival of the 18th–19th century the local population was active in promoting Bulgarian culture by constructing churches, monastery schools and chitalishta. The Shipka Pass, which connects the valley with northern Bulgaria via the Balkan Mountains, was the site of one of the most important battles of the Russo-Turkish War of 1877–1878, which led to the Liberation of Bulgaria from Ottoman rule. After the liberation, the town of Kazanlak rose was an important cultural and economic center.

== Settlements and transportation ==
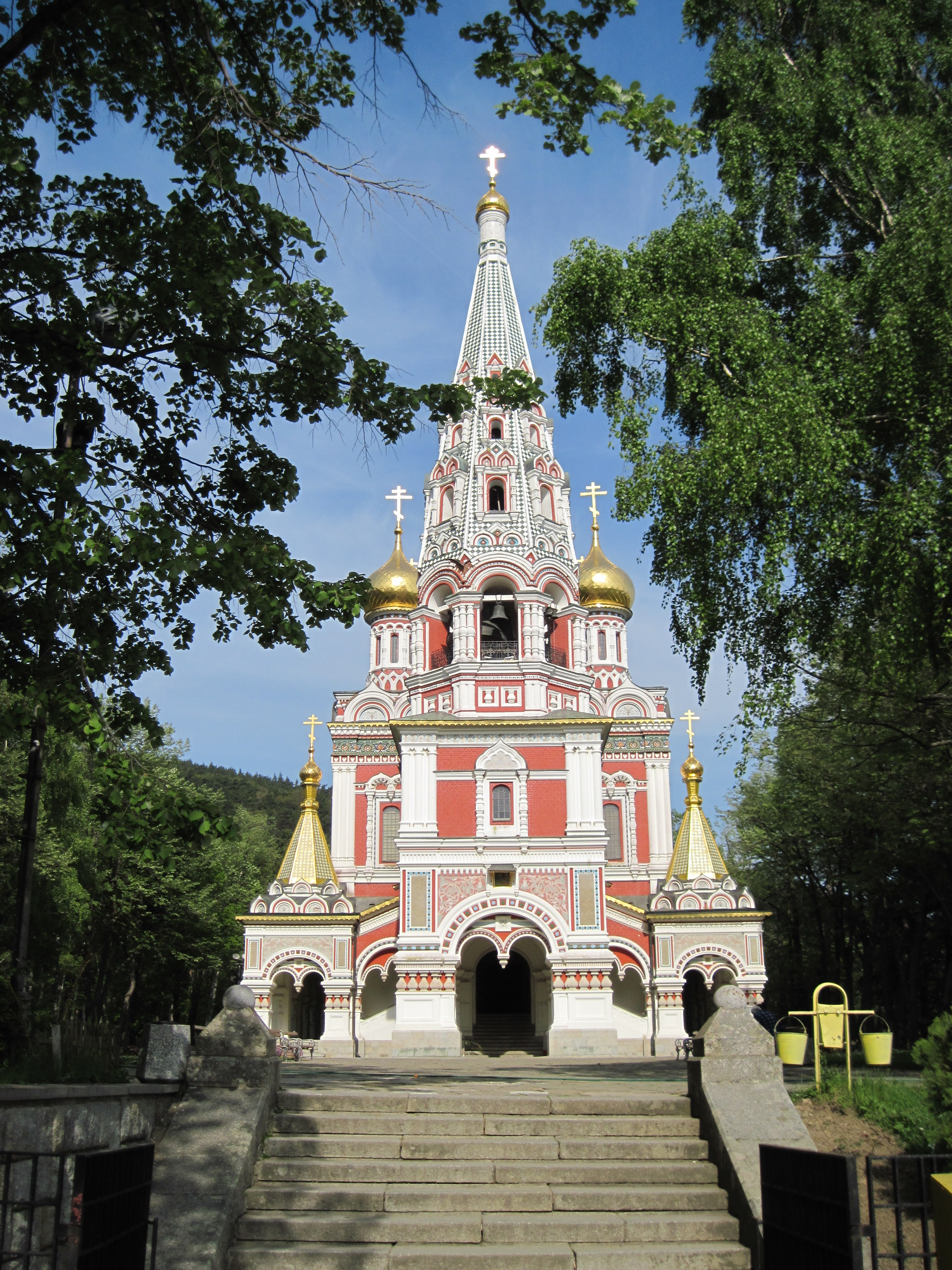
The Shipka Memorial Church

Administratively, the valley is situated in Stara Zagora Province. There are six towns, Kazanlak, Pavel Banya, Maglizh, Shipka, Nikolaevo and Kran. The villages are 39 — Aleksandrovo, Asen, Buzovgrad, Vetren, Viden, Gabarevo, Golyamo Dryanovo, Gorno Izvorovo, Gorno Sahrane, Gorno Cherkovishte, Dolno Izvorovo, Dolno Sahrane, Dunavtsi, Dabovo, Edrevo, Elhovo, Enina, Zimnitsa, Koprinka, Kanchevo, Manolovo, Nova Mahala, Ovoshtnik, Osetovo, Panicherevo, Rozovo, Razhena, Skobelevo, Tulovo, Turia, Tazha, Tarnicheni, Hadzhidimitrovo, Cherganovo, Shanovo, Sheynovo, Yulievo, Yagoda and Yasenovo.

The valley is served by five roads of the national network, as well as local roads. From west to east Kalofer and Nikolaevo it is traversed by a 73.3 km stretch of the first class I-6 road Gyueshevo–Sofia–Karlovo–Burgas. From north to south from Shipka to Yagoda runs a 31.1 km stretch of the first class I-5 road Ruse–Veliko Tarnovo–Stara Zagora–Makaza. In the easternmost reaches is a 3.9 km section of the second class II-55 road Debelets–Nova Zagora–Svilengrad. In the western part of the valley in direction northeast–southwest runs a 23.3 km stretch of the second class II-56 road between Shipka and Turia. In the central area is a 3.7 km section of the third class III-608 road Shipka–Brezovo–Plovdiv.

A section of railway line No. 3 Iliyantsi (Sofia)–Karlovo–Sliven–Karnobat–Varna served by the Bulgarian State Railways crosses the valley in direction west–east between the railway stations of Kalofer and Nikolaevo. The valley is also traversed by a section of railway line No. 5 Ruse–Stara Zagora–Podkova between Dabovo and Razhena.

== Economy and tourism ==
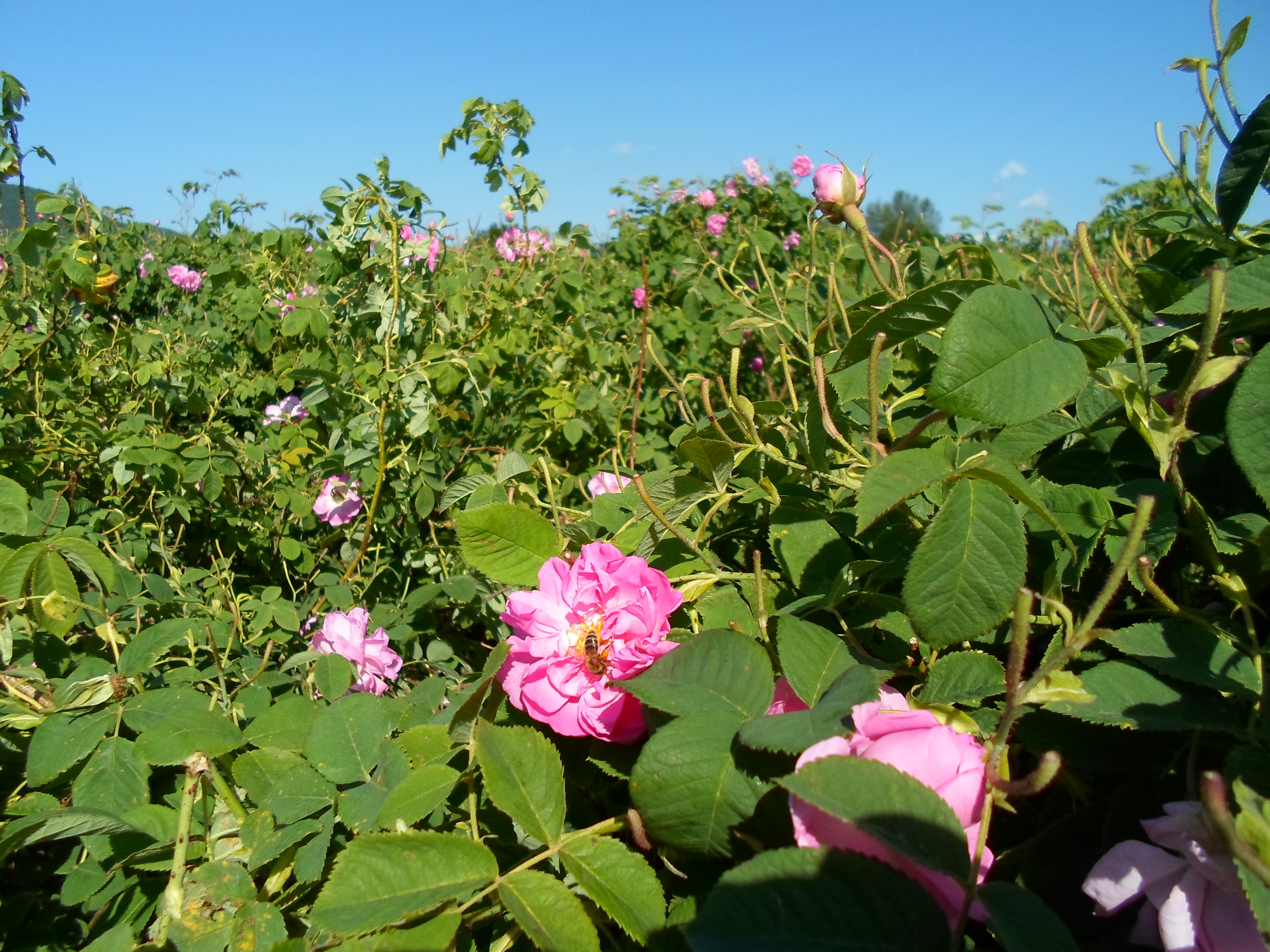
Roses in Kazanlak Valley

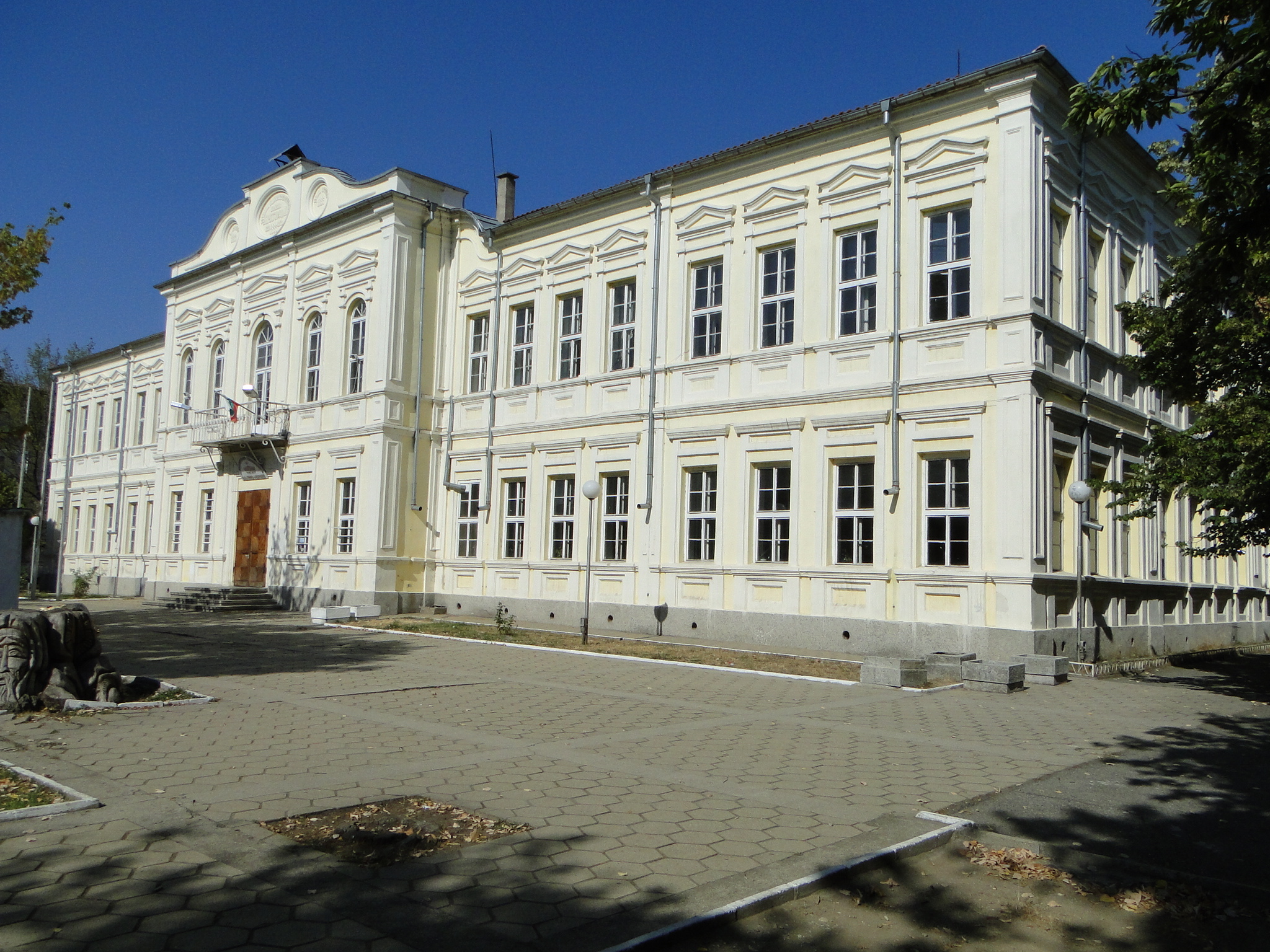
A school in Kazanlak

The valley's main economic hub is Kazanlak Municipality, which produces 83% of the local GDP. The town of Kazanlak is a major industrial hub, centered on armaments and machine-building. It is the base of Arsenal AD — the largest company of the Bulgarian defense industry, employing over 10,000 people. It produces firearms, air defense equipment, artillery, munitions, explosives, ED devices, industrial machinery, etc. Kazanlak is the main producer of hydraulic machinery in the country, the main manufacturers being M+S Hydraulic with over 1,200 employees and Kaproni with over 800 employees. The factory of Hranmehanika produces machines for the food industry. Several other machine-building factories are located in the towns of Shipka and Kran.

The favourable climatic conditions are conducive to the cultivation of industrial crops, such as Rosa × damascena, lavander, lemon balm, mint and rosemary; orchards; viticulture; grain and walnuts. The valley is the largest producer of damascene rose and rose oil in Bulgaria. The Institute of Roses and Essential Oil Crops, part of the Agricultural Academy of Bulgaria, is situated in Kazanlak and is a major national center for scientific research, service, and support activities in the field of aromatic and medicinal crops.

There are numerous tourist attractions in the valley. The town of Kazanlak is home to several museums and art galleries, dedicated to history, the damascene rose and the local writer and painter Chudomir. It also hosts the Rose Festival since 1903, which is among the most recognizable regular events in Bulgaria. Some of the most important religious sites include the Shipka Memorial Church near the homonymous town, the St Nicholas Maglizh Monastery and the Church of St Demetrius in Maglizh.

Pavel Banya is an important spa resort with several mineral springs with a discharge of 15 L/sec and temperature of 19 °С–61 °С. It receives 30 thousand visitors annually. There are also mineral baths in the village of Yagoda with temperature of 40 °С–45 °С. Both of them are located in the southern limits of the valley at the foothills of Sredna Gora.

The Kazanlak Valley is the starting point of many routes exploring the rich nature of the surrounding mountain ranges. The northern slopes of its westernmost reaches fall within the Central Balkan National Park and two of its nature reserves, Dzhendema and Sokolna. The main ridge of the Balkan Mountains at the Uzana locality north of the valley's center is the geographic center of Bulgaria. The road across the Shipka Pass leads to the Shipka Monument, one of the most important national memorial complexes, offering among others panoramic views over the valley.

== Sources ==
- Георгиев (Georgiev), Владимир (Vladimir) (1982). Енциклопедия България. Том III. И-Л [Encyclopaedia Bulgaria. Volume III. I-L] (in Bulgarian). и колектив. София (Sofia): Издателство на БАН (Bulgarian Academy of Sciences Press).
- Мичев (Michev), Николай (Nikolay); Михайлов (Mihaylov), Цветко (Tsvetko); Вапцаров (Vaptsarov), Иван (Ivan); Кираджиев (Kiradzhiev), Светлин (Svetlin) (1980). Географски речник на България [Geographic Dictionary of Bulgaria] (in Bulgarian). София (Sofia): Наука и култура (Nauka i kultura).
- Андреев (Andreev), Йордан (Jordan); Лазаров (Lazarov), Иван (Ivan); Павлов (Pavlov), Пламен (Plamen) (2012). Кой кой е в средновековна България [Who is Who in Medieval Bulgaria] (in Bulgarian). Изток Запад (Iztok Zapad). ISBN 978-619-152-012-1.
