= Tvarditsa Valley =

Valley in Bulgaria

- Valley
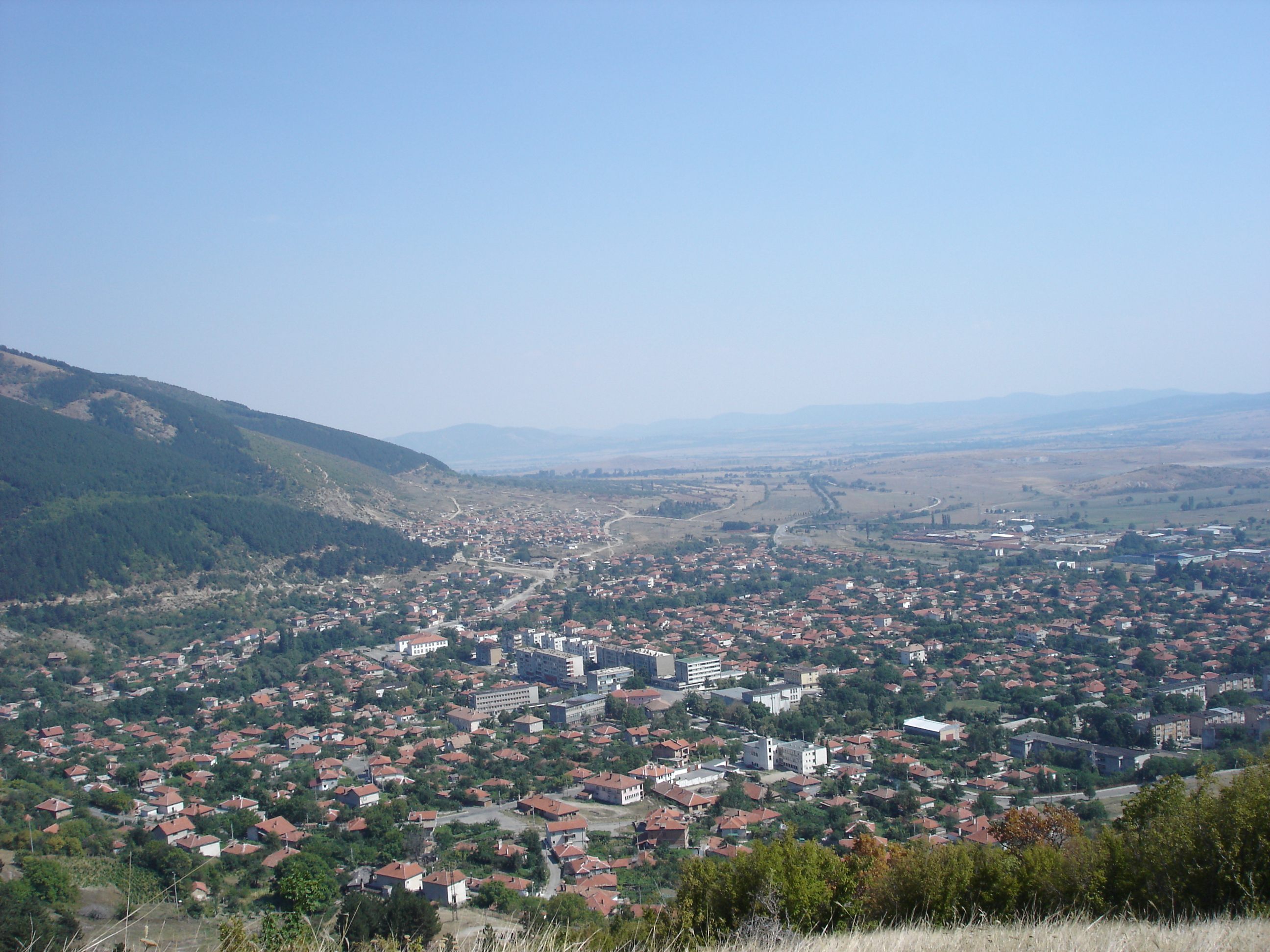
- Partial view of the valley
- Interactive map of Tvarditsa Valley
- Coordinates: 42°40′4″N 25°58′52″E
- Location: Bulgaria

Area
  - Total: 287 km^{2} (111 sq mi)

Dimensions
  - Length: 34 km (21 mi)
  - Width: 6 km (3.7 mi)

Tvarditsa Valley (Bulgarian: Твърдишка котловина) is situated in central Bulgaria. It is named after the town of Tvarditsa, its main settlement. It is the eighth of the eleven Sub-Balkan valleys in direction west–east.

== Geography ==
The valley is enclosed between the Balkan Mountains to the north and the ridges of Yamurdzha, Mezhdenik and Shivachevski to the south, the three of them situated just north of the Sredna Gora mountain range. The former two ridges separate it from the Kazanlak Valley to the west, while the latter is the boundary with the Sliven Valley to the east.

It spans a territory of 287 km^{2}, of them 118 km^{2} are the valley floor. It reaches a length of 34 km in direction west–east and a width of 5–6 km. The average altitude varies between 200 m and 250 m. The Tvarditsa Valley is inclined in southern direction. It is divided in two parts, the Tvarditsa field to the west with an altitude of 250 m and the Shivachevsko field to the east with an altitude of 200 m.

Along its northern slopes there are many alluvial fans formed by the rivers streaming from the Balkan Mountains. The slopes are built up of granite, Paleogene clays, gneiss, sandstone and conglomerates and are subject to active erosion. The soils are mostly alluvial. The valley is drained by several left tributaries of the Tundzha of the Aegean Sea basin — the Radova reka, the Tvardishka reka and the Byala reka. On the boundary with the Kazanlak Valley on the river Tundzha is located the Zhrebchevo Reservoir.

== Settlements, transportation and economy ==
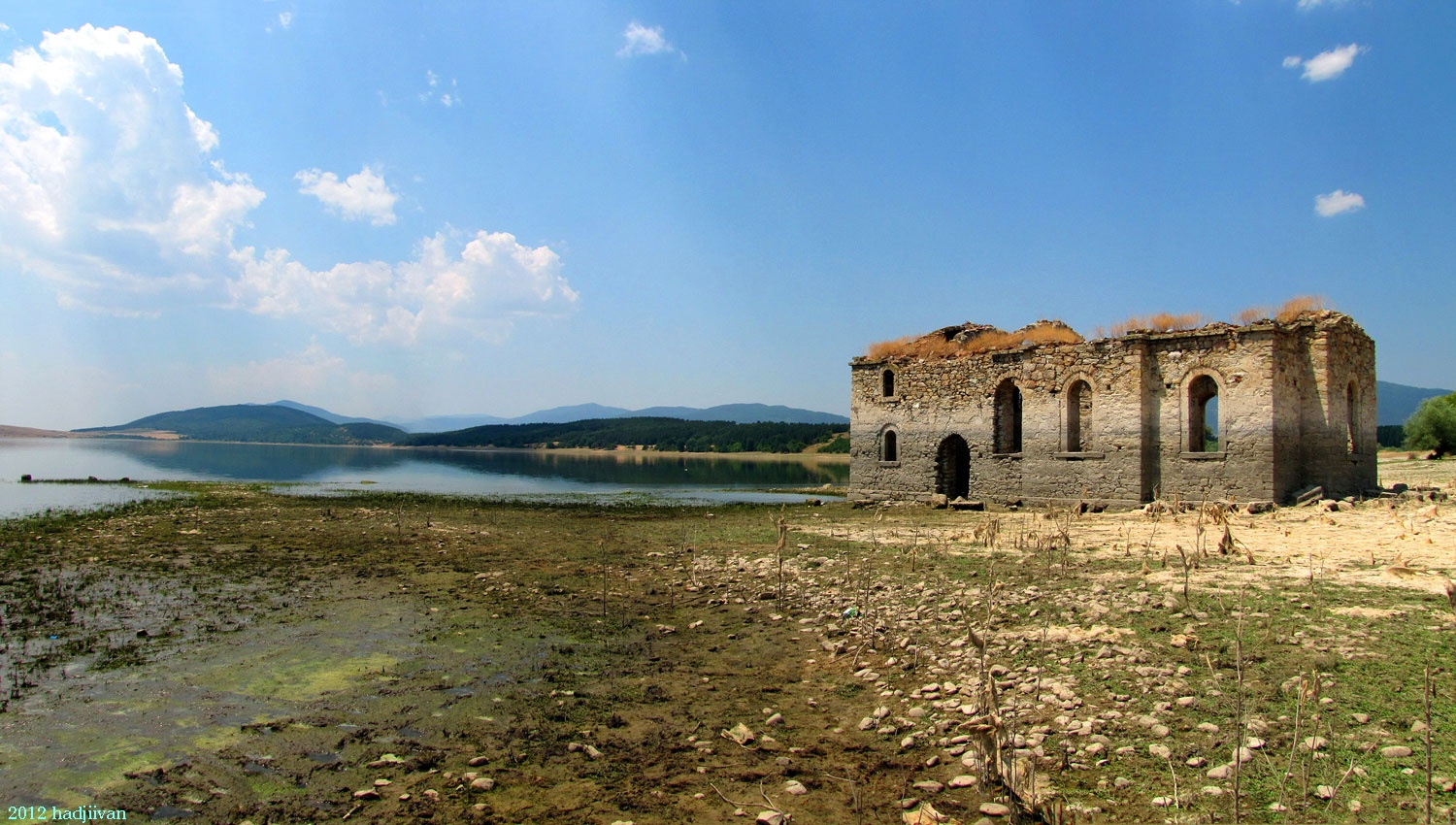
The submerged Church of St John of Rila in Zhrebchevo Reservoir

Administratively, the Tvarditsa Valley falls in Sliven and Stara Zagora Provinces. There are three towns — Tvarditsa, Gurkovo and Shivachevo, and three villages — Konare, Orizari and Sborishte.

The valley is served by three roads of the national network, as well as local roads. From west to east between Nikolaevo and Bliznets passes a 20 km stretch of the first class I-6 road Gyueshevo–Sofia–Karlovo–Burgas. The westernmost reaches are traversed by a 6 km section of the second class II-55 road Debelets–Nova Zagora–Svilengrad. From north to south in its center is a 14.5 km section of the third class III-662 road Nova Zagora–Tvarditsa–Elena.

A section of railway line No. 3 Iliyantsi (Sofia)–Karlovo–Sliven–Karnobat–Varna served by the Bulgarian State Railways crosses the valley in direction west–east between the railway stations of Nikolaevo and Chumerna.

The main industry is textiles, based in Tvarditsa, with export markets in Sweden, France, Canada, Greece and Serbia. Agriculture is well developed, the main crops being grain, grapes and orchards — cherries, sour cherries, apples, walnuts.

== Sources ==
- Мичев (Michev), Николай (Nikolay); Михайлов (Mihaylov), Цветко (Tsvetko); Вапцаров (Vaptsarov), Иван (Ivan); Кираджиев (Kiradzhiev), Светлин (Svetlin) (1980). Географски речник на България [Geographic Dictionary of Bulgaria] (in Bulgarian). София (Sofia): Наука и култура (Nauka i kultura).
