= Shipka (town) =

Shipka Шипка
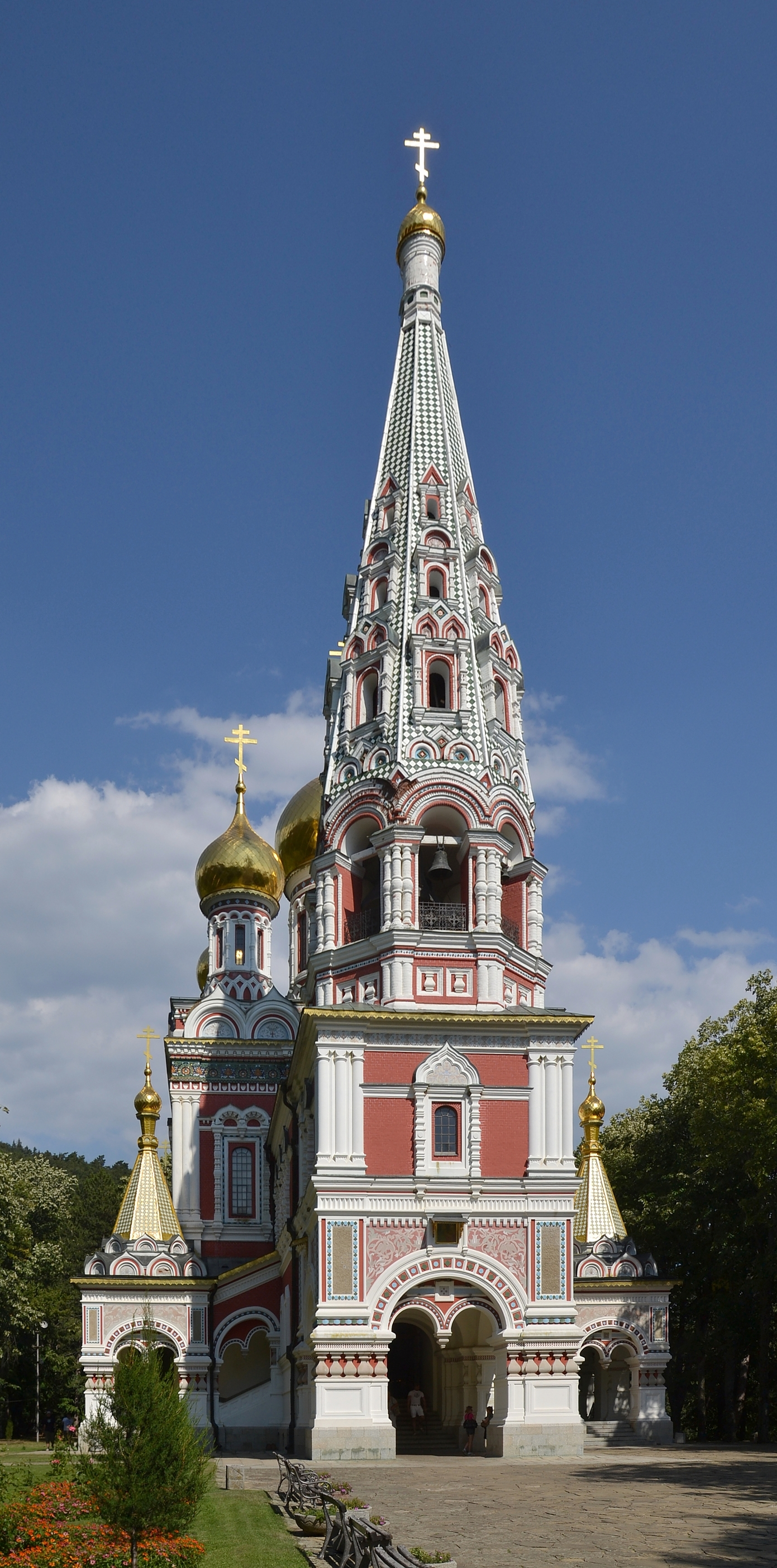
- The Memorial Temple of the Birth of Christ

- Location of Shipka (town)
- Coordinates: 42°42′N 25°23′E
- Country: Bulgaria
- Provinces (Oblast): Stara Zagora

Government
  - Mayor: Stoyan Ivanov
- Elevation: 650 m (2,130 ft)

Population (2005)
  - Total: 1,398
- Time zone: UTC+2 (EET)
  - Summer (DST): UTC+3 (EEST)
- Postal Code: 6150
- Area code: 04324
- License plate: CT

Shipka (Bulgarian: Шипка [ˈʃipkɐ], "Rosa canina") is a town in central Bulgaria, part of Kazanlak Municipality, Stara Zagora Province. It lies in the Central Balkan Mountains at 650 metres above sea level, facing the Kazanlak Valley. As of 2005, Shipka had a population of 1,398.

The town is known for being located near the historic Shipka Pass, the location of several key battles in the Russo-Turkish War of 1877-78. Local sights include the Shipka Monument (1934) on Stoletov Peak, the Buzludzha Monument, the Russian-style Shipka Memorial Church (1885–1902) and the recently discovered Thracian tomb Golyamata Kosmatka.

The settlement was declared a town on 23 August 1977, on the occasion of the 100th anniversary of the Libertation of Bulgaria.

The population is overwhelmingly Eastern Orthodox and ethnically Bulgarian, with a notable minority of Karakachans (a Greek-speaking transhumant people of obscure origin).

== Shipka Pass ==
Shipka Pass (el. 1150 m./3820 ft.) is 13 kilometres (8.1 mi) from the town, and connects the town with Gabrovo. During the Russo-Turkish War, Shipka Pass was the scene of a series of conflicts collectively named the Battle of Shipka Pass. The Shipka Memorial (Bulgarian: паметник „Шипка“), a memorial to those who died for the Liberation of Bulgaria during the Battles of Shipka Pass, stands near the pass.

== Notable buildings ==
- Shipka Memorial Church
- Tomb of Seuthes III
