= Shivachevo =

Shivachevo Шивачево
- Location of Shivachevo, Bulgaria
- Coordinates: 42°41′N 26°02′E
- Country: Bulgaria
- Provinces (Oblast): Sliven

Government
  - Mayor: Petar
- Elevation: 260 m (850 ft)

Population (2006-06)
  - Total: 3,968
- Time zone: UTC+2 (EET)
  - Summer (DST): UTC+3 (EEST)
- Postal Code: 8895
- Area code: 04593
- License plate: CH

Shivachevo (Bulgarian: Шивачево [ʃiˈvat͡ʃɛvo]) is a small town in the Sliven Province located in the Tvarditsa Valley on the southern slopes of the Balkan Mountains in central eastern Bulgaria.

== History ==
The area around the present town of Shivachevo has been inhabited since ancient times. Numerous archeological artifacts have been found in the area. Thracian earthenware used during funeral ceremonies and containing burnt bones and wheat were found in the yard of the present-day school. Other discoveries include a Thracian bronze helmet, Roman coins, and Byzantine coins with the faces of the emperors Justinian I and Nikiforos Foka.

From the distant past the inhabitants of Shivachevo were famous for their patriotic spirit. They aided the volunteer detachments (named "haidushki chet") who fought against the Turkish rule during the 19th century. After the Crimean War (1853–1856) and the new Turkish laws that followed it, a committee was established in Shivachevo in 1857 for building a church which was finished in 1859 and was given the name of St. Dimitar. The town celebration is held on October 26 every year on St. Dimitar's Day.

The year 1860 is connected with the opening of the first school in Shivachevo on the grounds of the church. After the liberation of Bulgaria from Turkish rule in 1892, a new school building was constructed. The first female teacher, Tina Kirkova, was appointed in the same year. At a town meeting on August 22, 1909, the name of the village was changed from Terzobas (from the Turkish word for "tailor") to Eastern Shivachevo, "Shivach" (Шивач) stemming from the Bulgarian word for “tailor”. In 1934, the name was changed to Greater Shivachevo. In 1976, the village became, simply, Shivachevo. In 1984, the village officially became a town.

== Geography and climate ==
Shivachevo is located 260 km east of the capital Sofia, 35 km west of the city of Sliven, and 140 km west of the port city of Burgas on the Black Sea. Nearby towns and villages include Nova Zagora, Kazanlak, Sborishte, Banya, and the administrative center of the municipality, Tvarditsa.

The area surrounding the town is well known as the heart of the wine-growing region in Bulgaria. Vini Sliven, a winery operating out of Sliven, owns a production facility in Shivachevo, 220 hectares of vines in the area, and produces a well-regarded Cabernet Sauvignon named after the town, "Chateau Shivatchevo". Peaches, cherries, plums, and figs are also cultivated in the region.

== Demographics ==
As of 2006, the population was 3,968. Bulgarians make-up the largest ethnic group in the town, followed by Romani. There is no official estimate as to the percentage of Bulgarians to Romani.

== Culture ==
The town cultural center (Chitalishte / Читалище) was founded in 1898 and is called "Prosveta", which means "Enlightenment". A new building was constructed in 1958 and serves as the centerpiece of the town park. It currently houses a library, community meeting space, and theater for live performances.
