= Panicherevo =

Panicherevo Паничерево
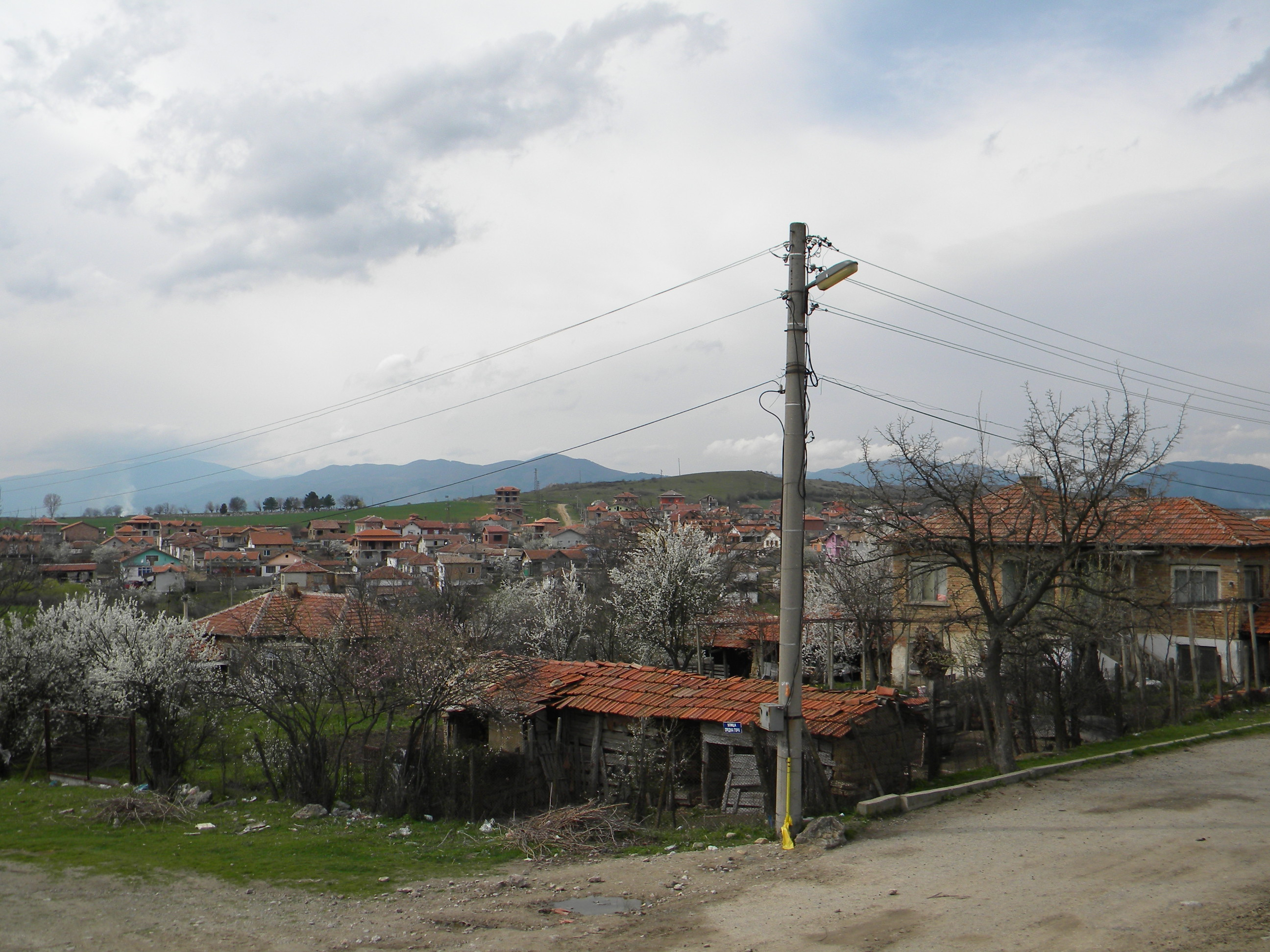
- Panicherevo

- Location of Panicherevo, Bulgaria
- Coordinates: 42°36′11.55″N 25°51′0.29″E
- Country: Bulgaria
- Provinces (Oblast): Stara Zagora Province

Government
  - Mayor: Atanas Gramatikov
- Elevation: 278 m (912 ft)

Population (15.03.2024)
  - Total: 1,963
- Time zone: UTC+2 (EET)
  - Summer (DST): UTC+3 (EEST)
- Postal Code: 6172
- Area codes: 04340 from Bulgaria, 003594340 from outside

Panicherevo (Bulgarian: Паничерево) is a village in central Bulgaria. It has a population of 1,963 as of 2024.

== Geography ==
Panicherevo is located in Stara Zagora Province and has a territory of 41.713 km^{2}. It is part of Gurkovo Municipality. The village lies on the second class II-55 road that connects Veliko Tarnovo in the north and Svilengrad on the border with Turkey and Greece to the south.

Panicherevo is situated in the Kazanlak Valley, at the southern foothills of the eastern lower parts of the Sredna Gora mountain range. The Balkan Mountains rise a few kilometers to the north. The settlement is surrounded by low hills. The village is close to the shores of the Zhrebchevo Reservoir on the river Tundzha.
