= Yagoda, Bulgaria =

Yagoda Ягода
- Location of Yagoda, Bulgaria
- Coordinates: 42°32′30.86″N 25°34′8.73″E
- Country: Bulgaria
- Provinces (Oblast): Stara Zagora Province

Government
  - Mayor: Dimitar Dimitrov
- Elevation: 305 m (1,001 ft)

Population (15.09.2022)
  - Total: 2,843
- Time zone: UTC+2 (EET)
  - Summer (DST): UTC+3 (EEST)
- Postal Code: 6167
- Area codes: 04322 from Bulgaria, 003594322 from outside

Yagoda (Bulgarian: Ягода) is a village in central Bulgaria. It has a population of 2,843 as of 2022.

== Geography ==
Yagoda is located in Stara Zagora Province and has a territory of 17.485 km^{2}. It is part of Maglizh Municipality and lies 15 km north of the city of Stara Zagora. Yagoda is situated in the Kazanlak Valley, at the northern foothills of the Sredna Gora mountain range.

== Mineral springs ==
Yagoda is a small spa resort with numerous mineral springs with temperature of up to 52 °С and a discharge of 11.3 L/sec. The old mineral baths were constructed in the early 20th century and are a monument of culture. There are mineral pools and hotels.

== Economy ==
The village is located on the major first class I-5 road Ruse–Veliko Tarnovo–Stara Zagora–Haskovo–Makaza, very close to the intersection with the first class I-6 road Gyueshevo–Sofia–Karlovo–Burgas, and hosts logistics facilities of several companies.

Yagoda is situated in a fertile agricultural area with specific microclimate, favourable for industrial crops and specifically Rosa × damascena, as well as orchards, vegetables, grapes, strawberries, etc.
