= Tvarditsa Rocks =

Rocks the South Shetland Islands, Antarctica

- Location of Greenwich Island in the South Shetland Islands

- Location on Antarctic Peninsula Location in Antarctica

Geography
- Location: Antarctica
- Coordinates: 62°24′39″S 59°52′06″W
- Archipelago: South Shetland Islands

Administration
- Antarctica
- Administered under the Antarctic Treaty System

Demographics
- Population: uninhabited

Tvarditsa Rocks (Bulgarian: скали Твърдица, Bulgarian: ‘Skali Tvarditsa’ ska-'li tv&r-'di-tsa) is a group of rocks off the north coast of Greenwich Island in the South Shetland Islands, Antarctica situated 1.9 km (1.2 mi) northeast of Ongley Island, 1.3 km (0.81 mi) southwest of Stoker Island and 2.6 km (1.6 mi) west of Sierra Island.

The rocks are named after the town of Tvarditsa in southeastern Bulgaria.

== Location ==
Tvarditsa Rocks are located at 62°24′39″S 59°52′06″W (Bulgarian mapping in 2009).

Topographic map of Livingston Island, Greenwich, Robert, Snow and Smith Islands.

== See also ==
- Composite Antarctic Gazetteer – Authoritative international gazetteer containing all the Antarctic toponyms
- List of Antarctic islands south of 60° S
- SCAR – British organization
- Territorial claims in Antarctica

== Maps ==
L.L. Ivanov. Antarctica: Livingston Island and Greenwich, Robert, Snow and Smith Islands. Scale 1:120000 topographic map. Troyan: Manfred Wörner Foundation, 2009. ISBN 978-954-92032-6-4
