= Tvarditsa Municipality =

- Municipality
- Coat of arms

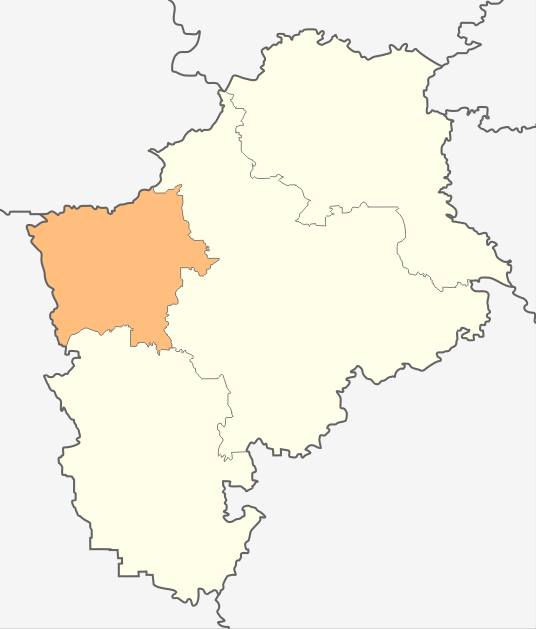
- Location of Tvarditsa Municipality in Sliven Province

- Location of Tvarditsa Municipality in Bulgaria
- Coordinates: 42°42′N 25°54′E
- Country: Bulgaria
- Province: Sliven Province
- Capital: Tvarditsa

Area
  - Total: 442.5 km^{2} (170.9 sq mi)

Population (2011)
  - Total: 13,804
  - Density: 31.20/km^{2} (80.80/sq mi)
- Postal code: 8890
- Area code: 0454

Tvarditsa Municipality (Bulgarian: Община Твърдица) is a municipality in the Sliven Province of Bulgaria.

== Demography ==
Ethnic composition of Sliven Municipality
1. Bulgarians (67.8%)
2. Turks (9.32%)
3. Gypsies/Romani (15.2%)
4. No identification (7.07%)
5. Other (0.59%)

Population size according to censuses over the years.

Census	Population
1934	12 057
1946	13 944
1956	16 434
1965	19 618
1975	18 066
1985	17 218
1992	17 215
2001	14 927
2011	13 804
2021	13 312

Ethnicity

At the 2011 census, the population of Tvarditsa was 13,804. Most of the inhabitants were Bulgarians (67.79%) with a minority of Turks (9.32%) and Gypsies/Romani (15.21%). 7.07% of the population's ethnicity was unknown.

Ethnicity	census 1992		census 2001		census 2011		census 2021	
Bulgarians	14 130	82.1	9 928	66.5	9 359	67.8	7 828	58.8
Gypsies/Roma	901	5.2	3 106	20.8	2 100	15.2	3 430	25.8
Turks	1 911	11.1	1 583	10.6	1 287	9.3	992	7.5
Others	273	1.6	196	1.3	82	0.6	67	0.4
Undeclared	-	-	60	0.4	137	1.0	107	0.8
Unknown	-	-	54	0.4	839	6.1	888	6.7
Total	17 215	100.0	14 927	100.0	13 804	100.0	13 312	100.0

The ethnic group of Bulgarian citizens of Roma origin in the municipality of Tvarditsa is significant and its number is about 30% of the total population. Since the Roma in the municipality cannot be officially counted, because a large part of them self-identify as Bulgarians, this information is taken approximately from the ESGRAON of the Tvarditsa municipal administration.

Ethnicity	2011	
Bulgarians	7 510	54.4
Gypsies/Roma	4 900	35.5
Turks	1 300	9.4
Others	90	0.7
Total	13 800	100.0

Distribution of Roma in the following settlements:

- Tvarditsa: 2 200 - 38.9%
- Shivachevo: 1 610 - 44.1%
- Sborishte: 990 - 55.3%
- Orizari: 100 - 18.2%

Parts of the places where Roma live have taken on the appearance of ghettos.

Religions

Religion	census 2011		census 2021	
Christianity	6 544	47.4	9 556	71.8
Islam	965	7.0	981	7.4
Other	18	0.1	0	0.0
No Religion	1 150	8.3	831	6.2
Unknown	5 127	37.1	1 944	14.6
Total	13 804	100.0	13 312	100.0

Ethnicity of school pupils

The integration of Roma children from the Municipality of Tvarditsa is a continuous process that has not stopped and continues to be implemented, albeit with considerable difficulties.

Ethnicity	2012/13		2013/14		2014/15	
Bulgarians	...	...	...	...	453	26.8
Gypsies/Roma	1 056	69.6	...	...	1 140	67.5
Turks	...	...	...	...	97	5.7
Others	...	...	...	...	0	0.0
Total	1 517	100.0	1 654	...	1 690	100.0

Birth rate

Year	2010	2011	2012	2013	2014	2015	2016	2017	2018	2019	2020	2021	2022	2023	2024
All live births	233	206	235	212	227	211	217	225	238	221	233	264	243	252	255
Mothers aged under twenty (Practically ethnic Roma)	64	58	73	62	77	74	71	64	82	87	85	94	98	104	104
Share of teenage mothers	27.5	28.2	31.1	29.2	33.9	35.6	32.7	28.4	34.5	39.4	36.5	35.6	40.4	41.3	40.8

In addition to Roma born to mothers under twenty years of age, there is also a significant proportion over that age. This means that of the newborns in the Municipality of Tvarditsa, over 50% are Roma.

== Villages ==
In addition to the capital town of Tvarditsa, there are 9 villages in the municipality:

- Bliznets
- Borov Dol
- Byala Palanka
- Zhalt Bryag
- Orizari
- Sborishte
- Sartsevo
- Chervenakovo
- Shivachevo
