= Shipka Memorial Church =

Eastern Orthodox Church in Bulgaria

Coordinates: 42°42′58″N 25°19′44″E

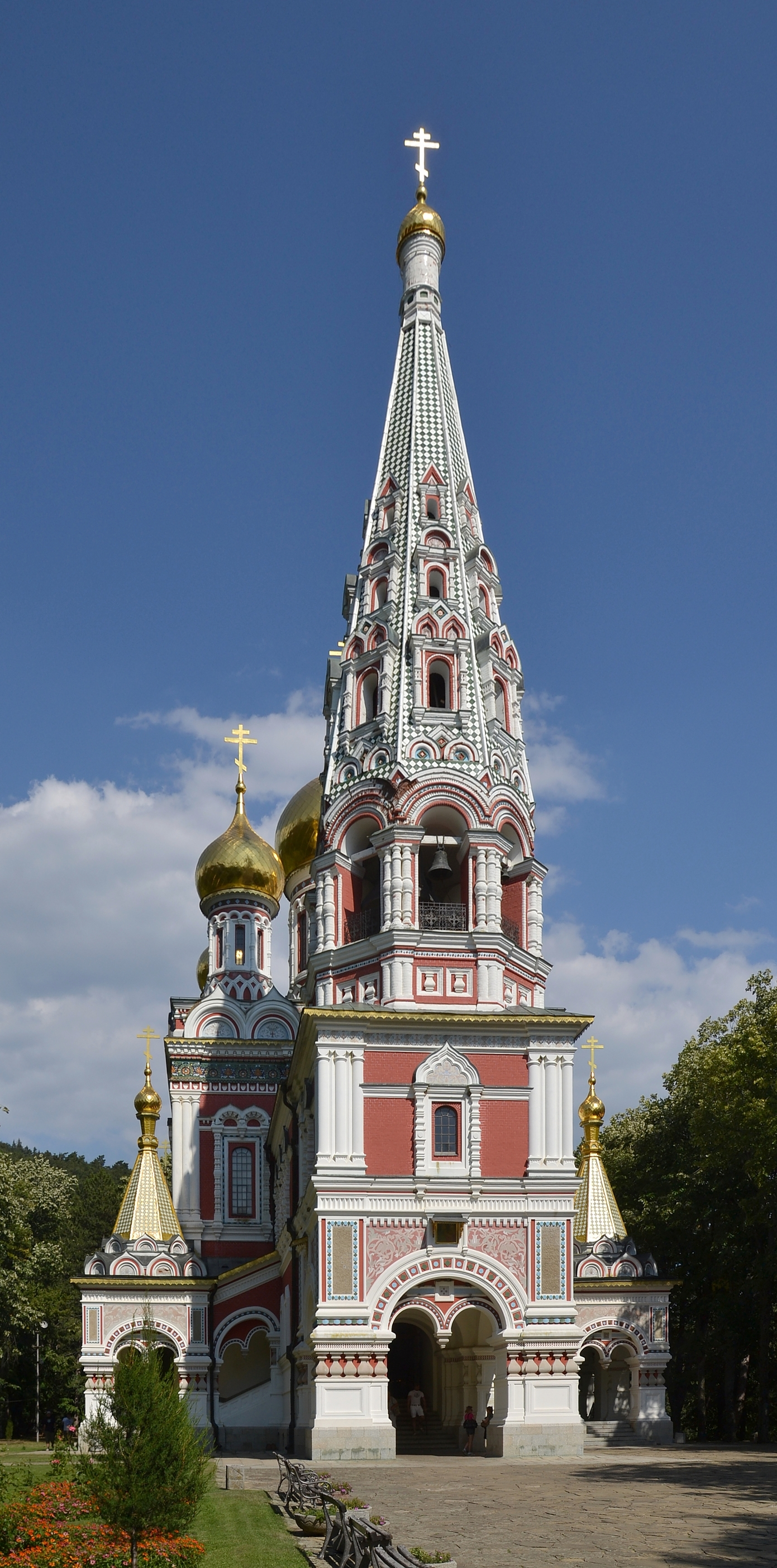
The western facade and the entrance

The Memorial Temple of the Birth of Christ (Bulgarian: Храм-паметник „Рождество Христово“, Hram-pametnik „Rozhdestvo Hristovo“), better known as the Shipka Memorial Church or Shipka Monastery is a Bulgarian Orthodox church built near the town of Shipka in Stara Planina between 1885 and 1902, according to Antoniy Tomishko's design in the seventeenth-century Russian style under the direction of architect Alexander Pomerantsev. It is dedicated, along with other parts of the Shipka Monument complex, to the Russian and Bulgarian soldiers who died for the liberation of Bulgaria in the Russo-Turkish War, 1877-78.

The temple was officially opened on September 28, 1902, in the presence of Russian Army generals and many honourable guests. The opening and consecration of the Shipka Memorial Church coincided with the 25-year anniversary of the Battles of Shipka Pass. In 1970, the temple was proclaimed a national monument of culture.

The church's bell tower reaches a height of 53 m, and its bells, the heaviest of which weighs 12 tons, were cast from the cartridges that were collected after the battles. In the temple itself, the names of the Russian regiments and Bulgarian volunteers are inscribed on 34 marble plates. The remains of the perished are laid in 17 stone sarcophagi in the church's crypt.

== Gallery ==
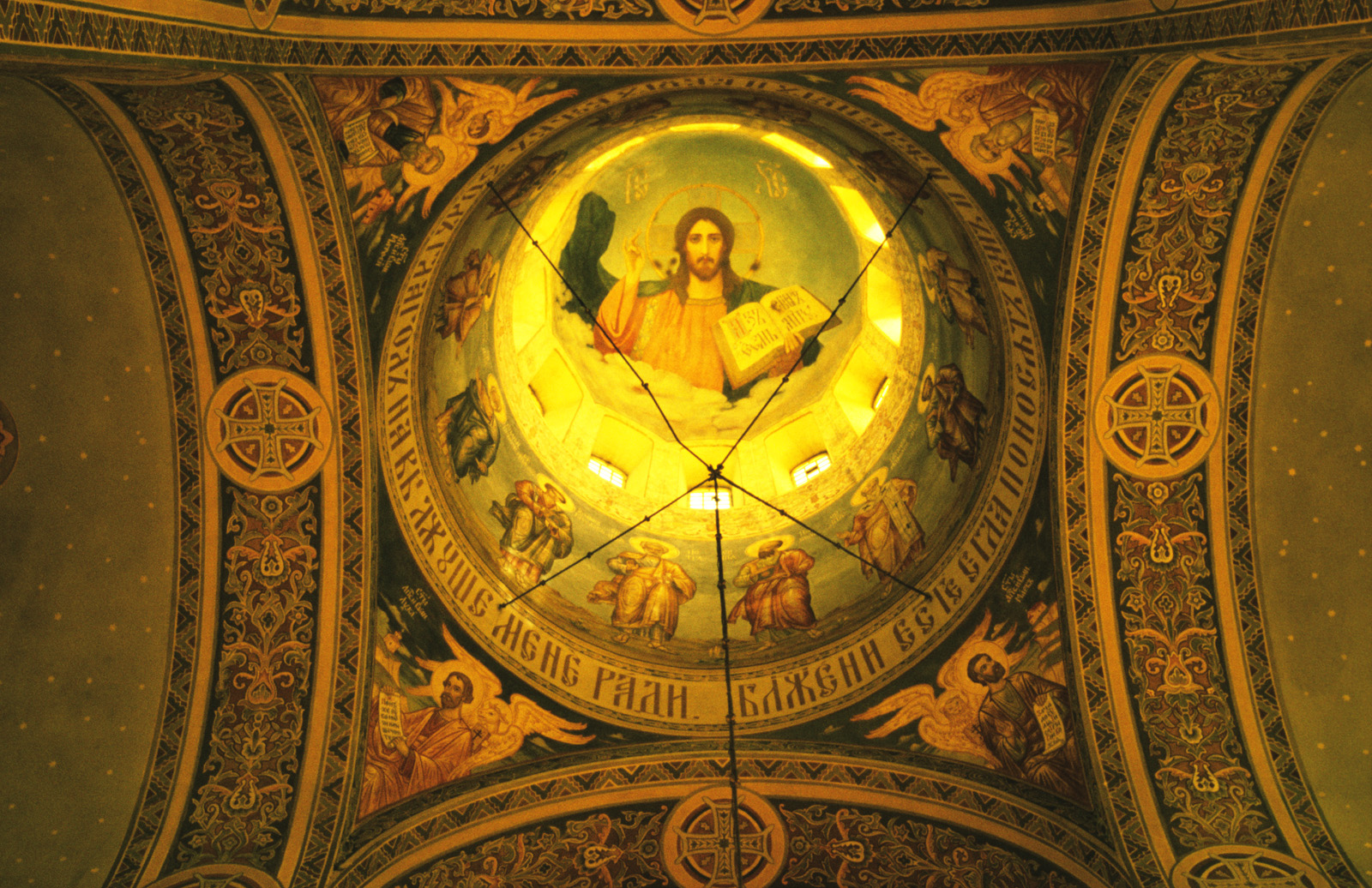
The dome - interior

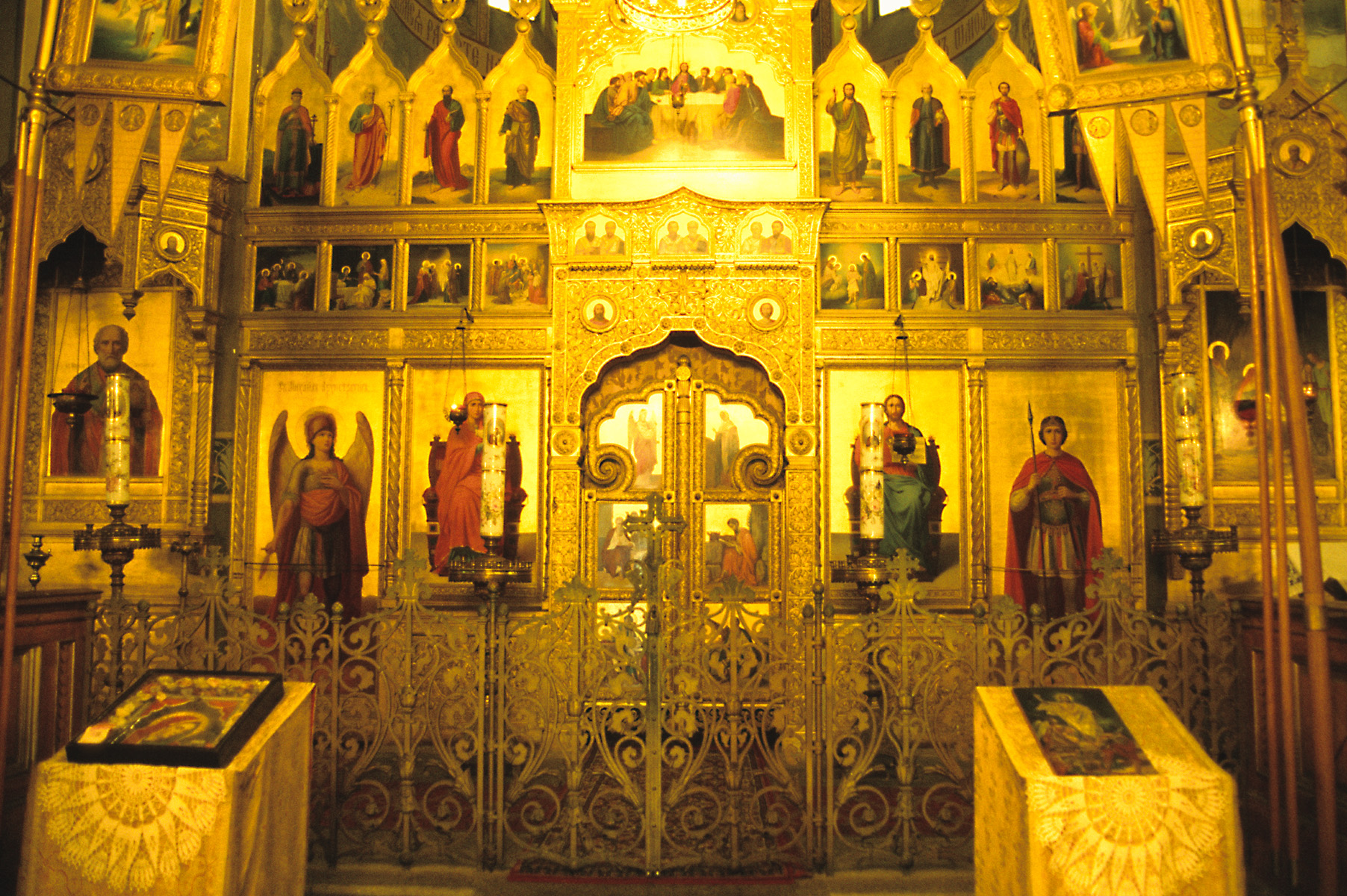
The church iconostasis

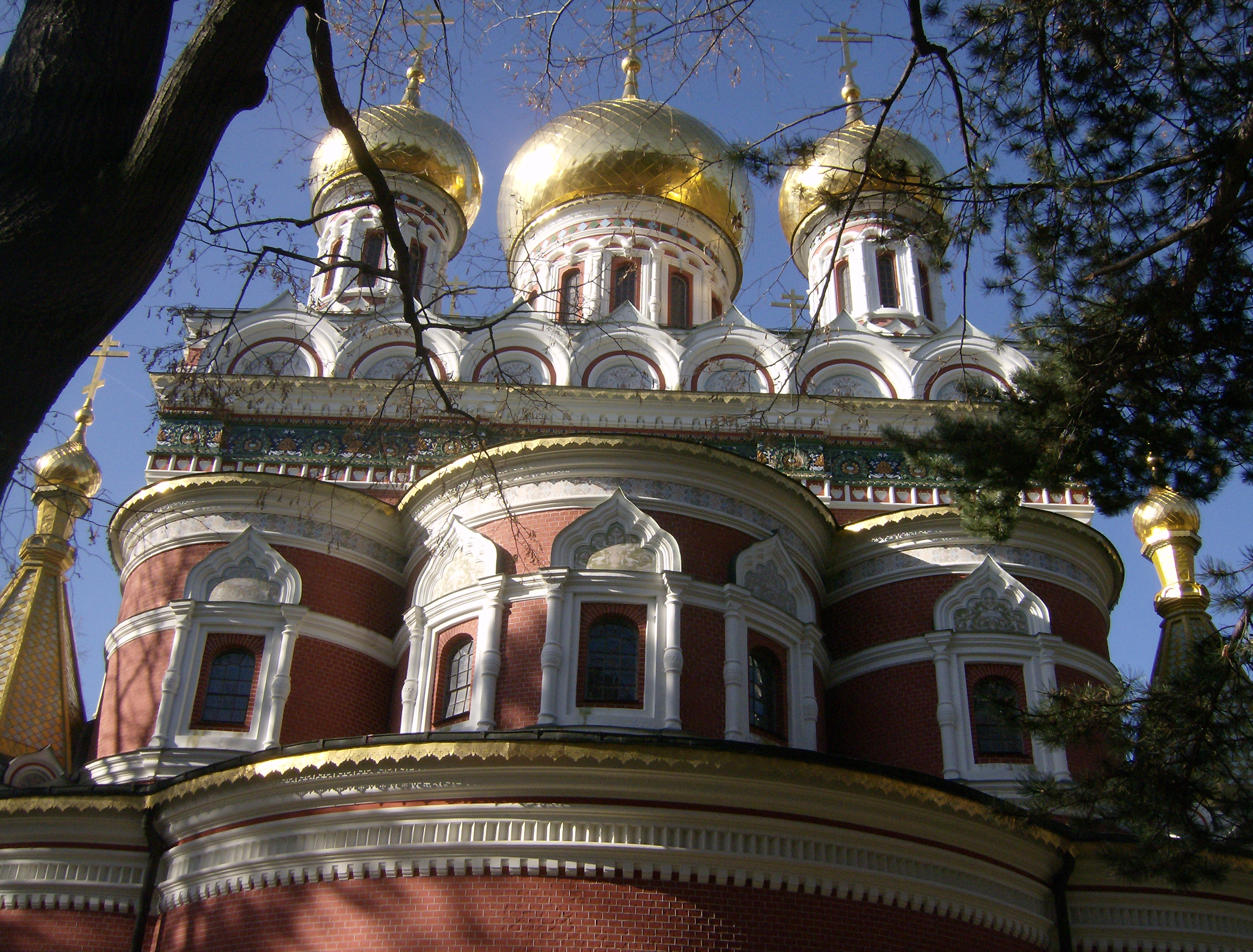
The onion-shaped gold-plated domes

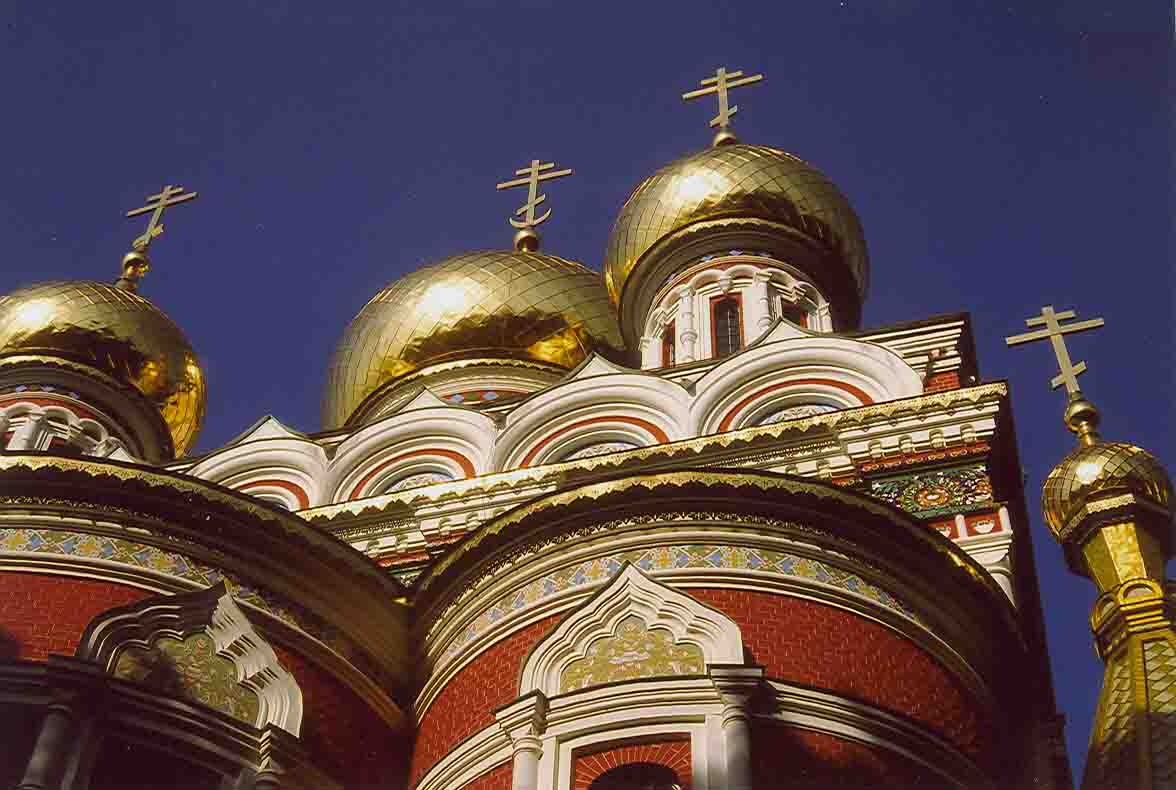

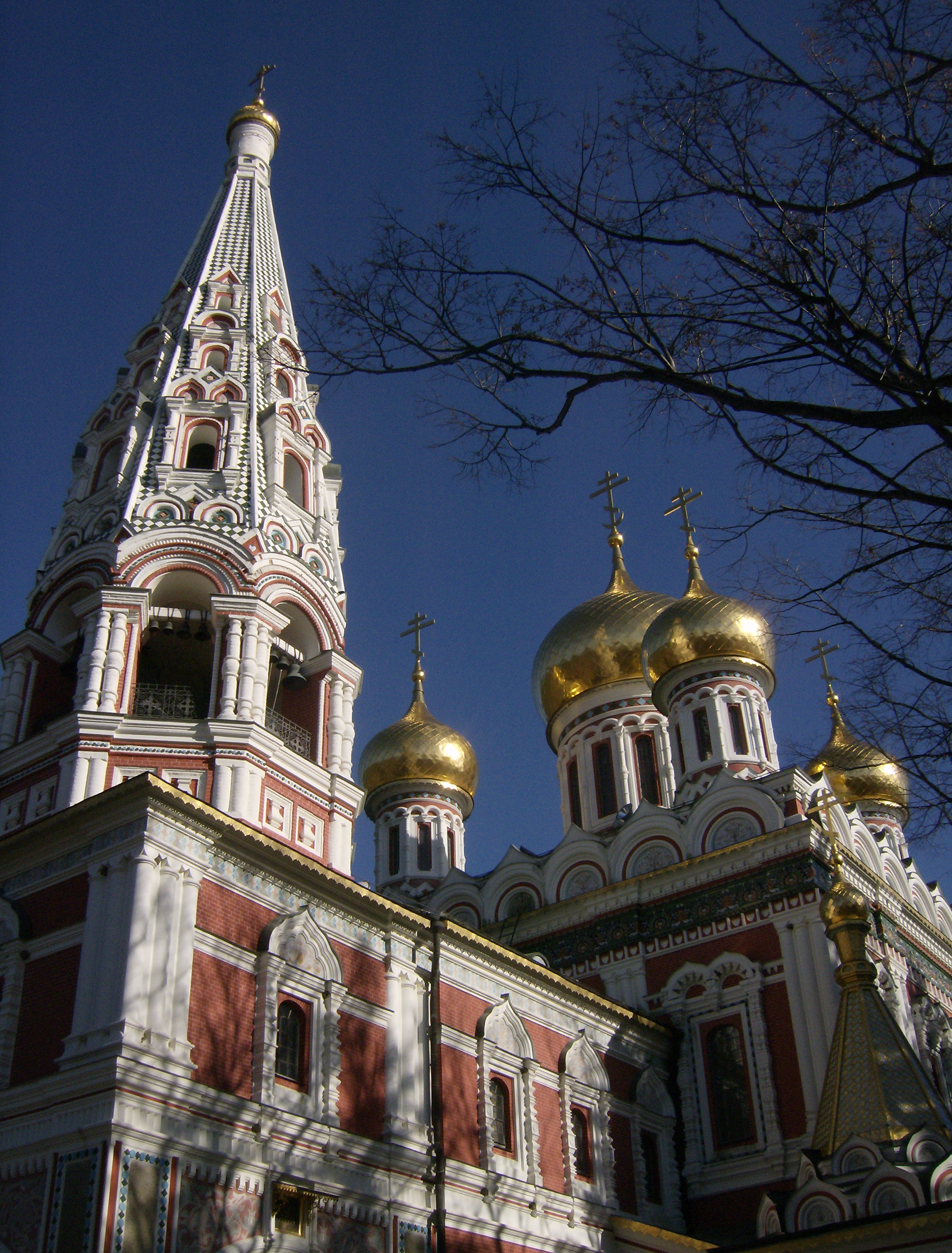
The Memorial Temple of the Birth of Christ

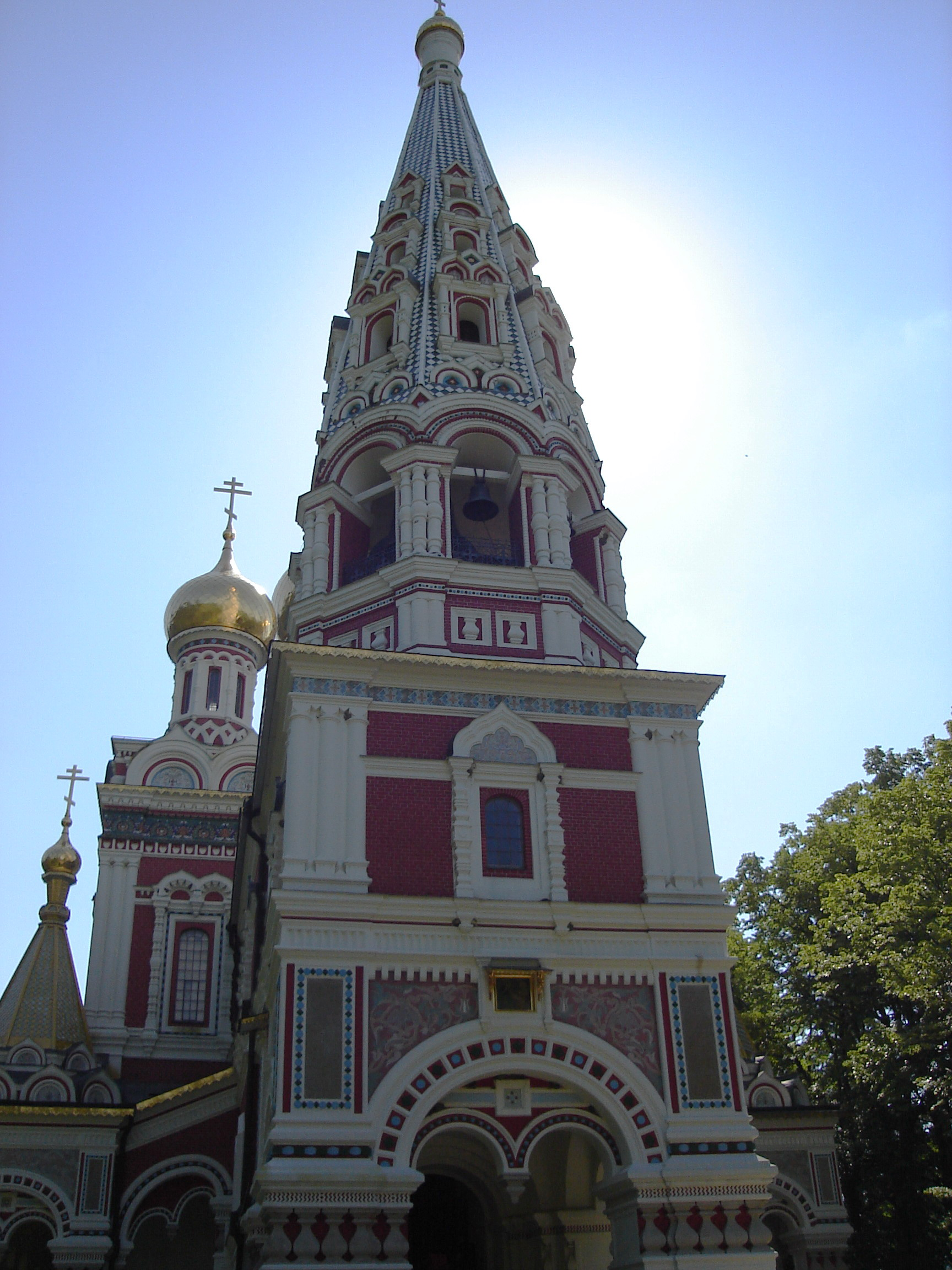

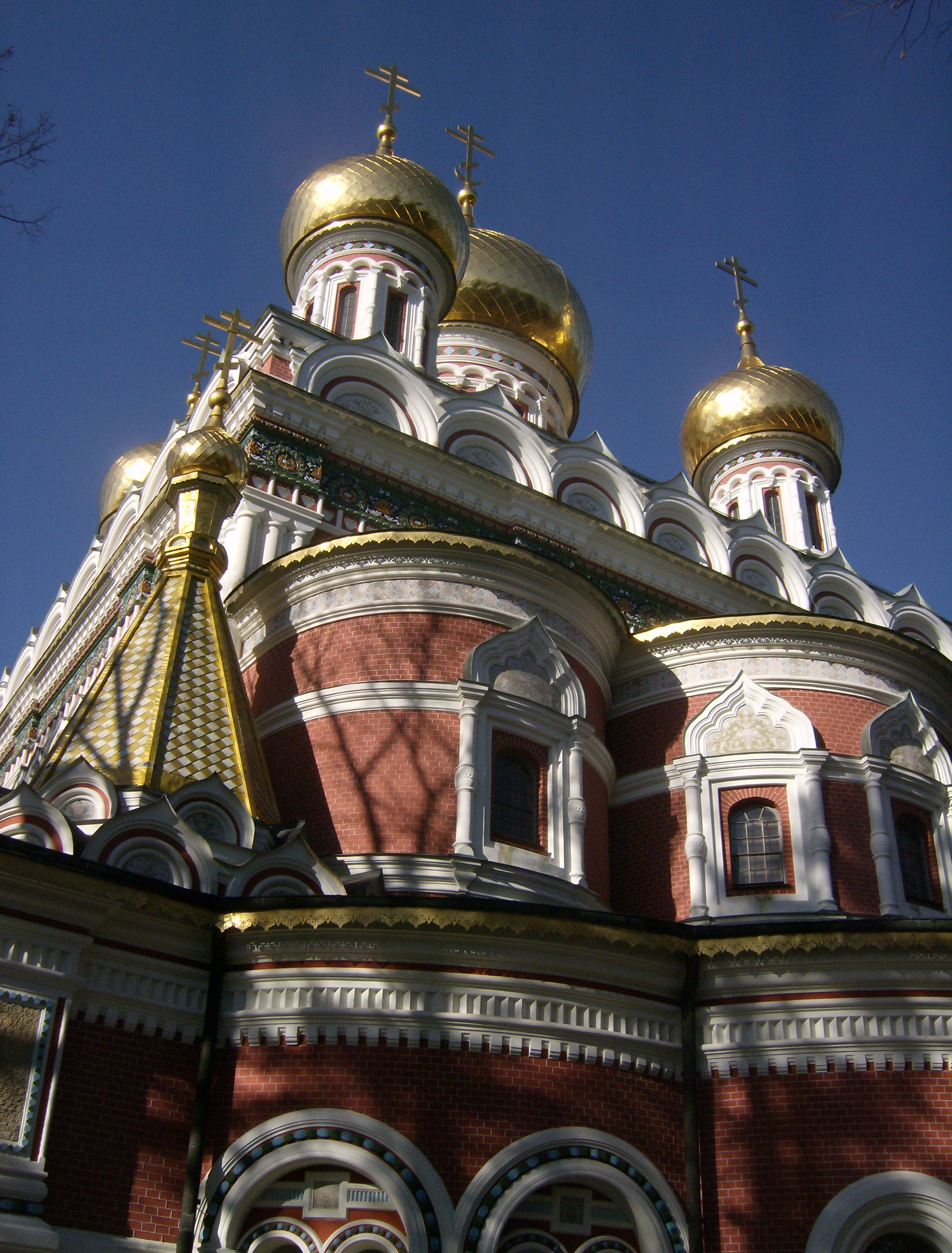

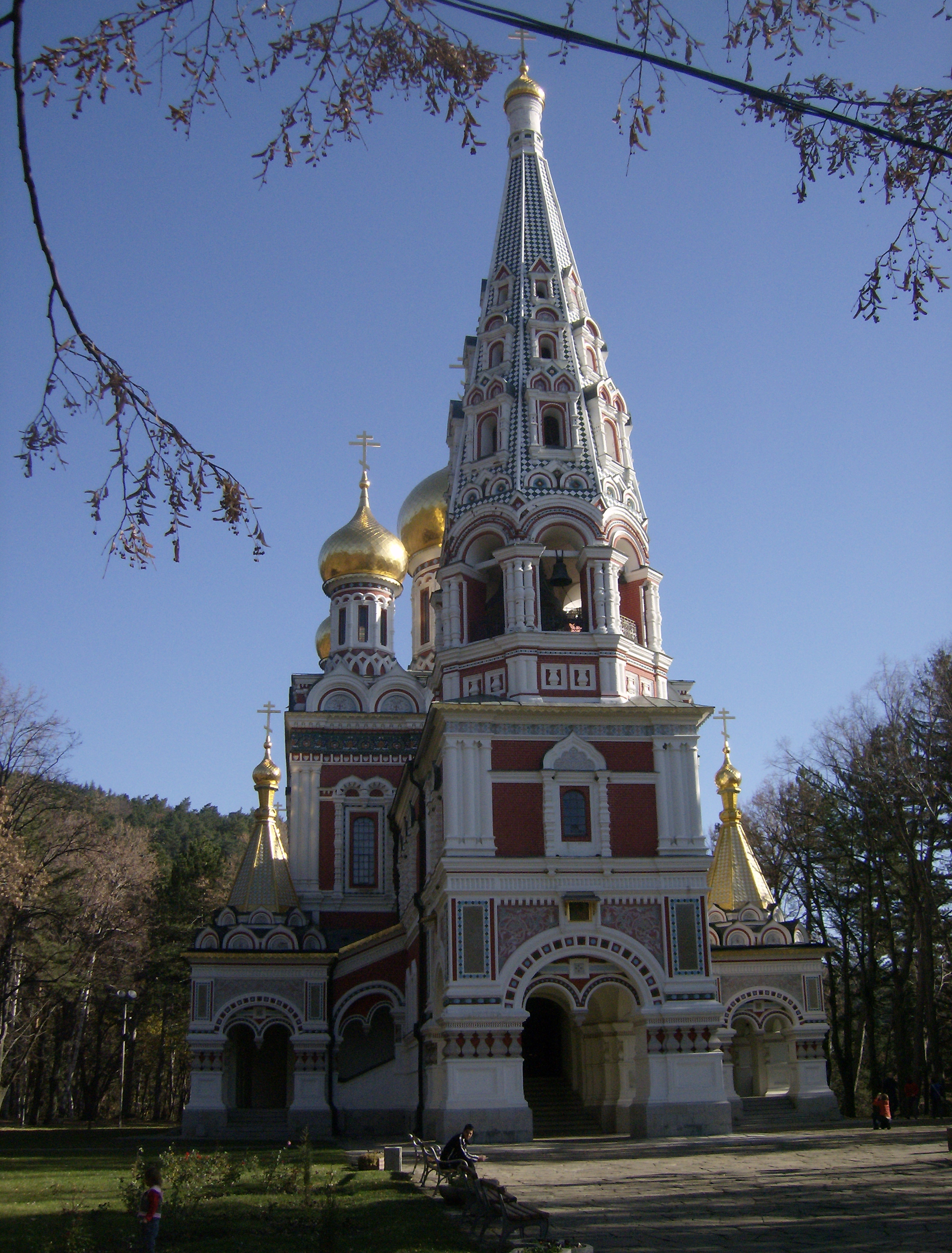

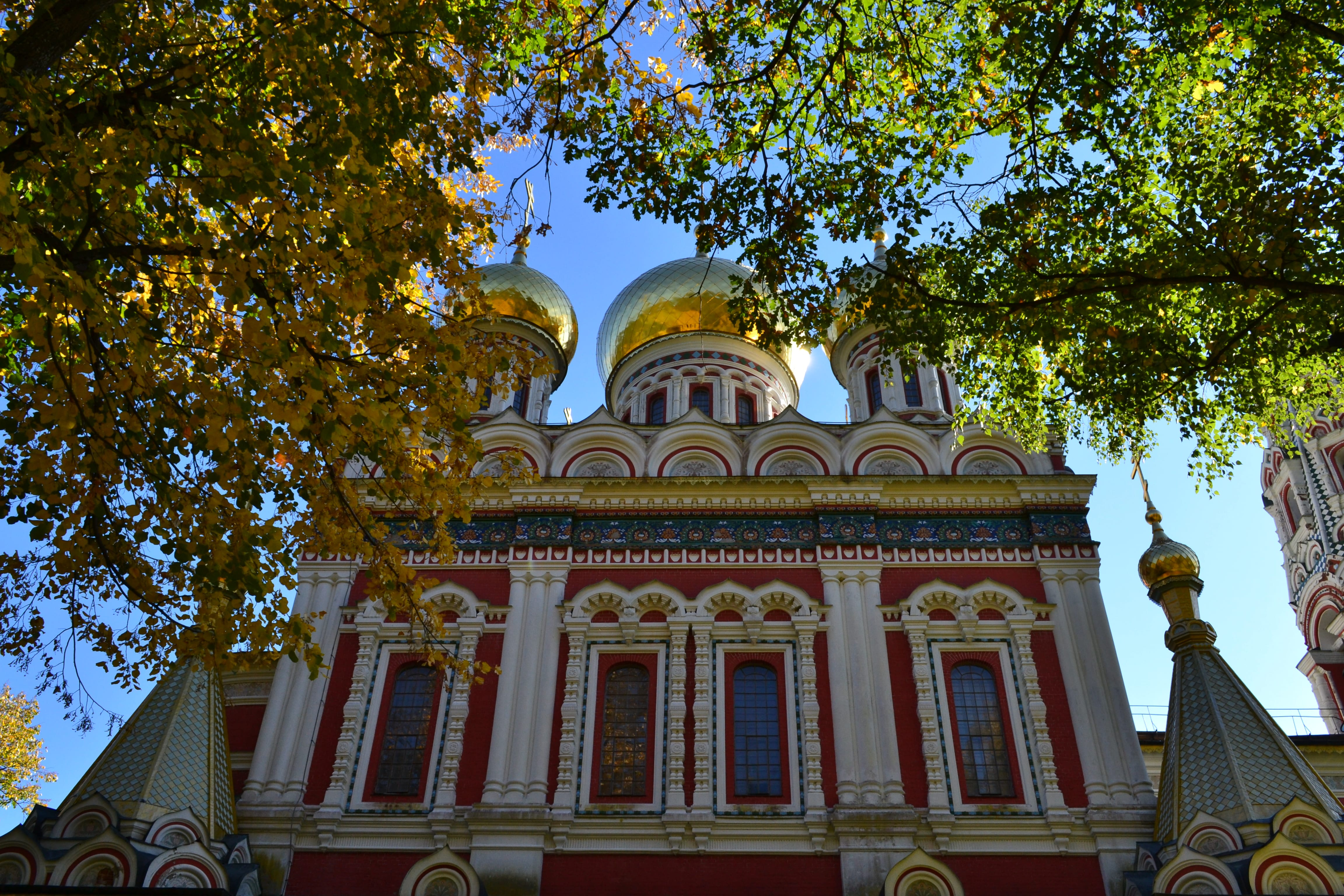
View of the Shipka Memorial Church from the Northern side of the garden
