= Nikolaevo =

Nikolaevo Николаево
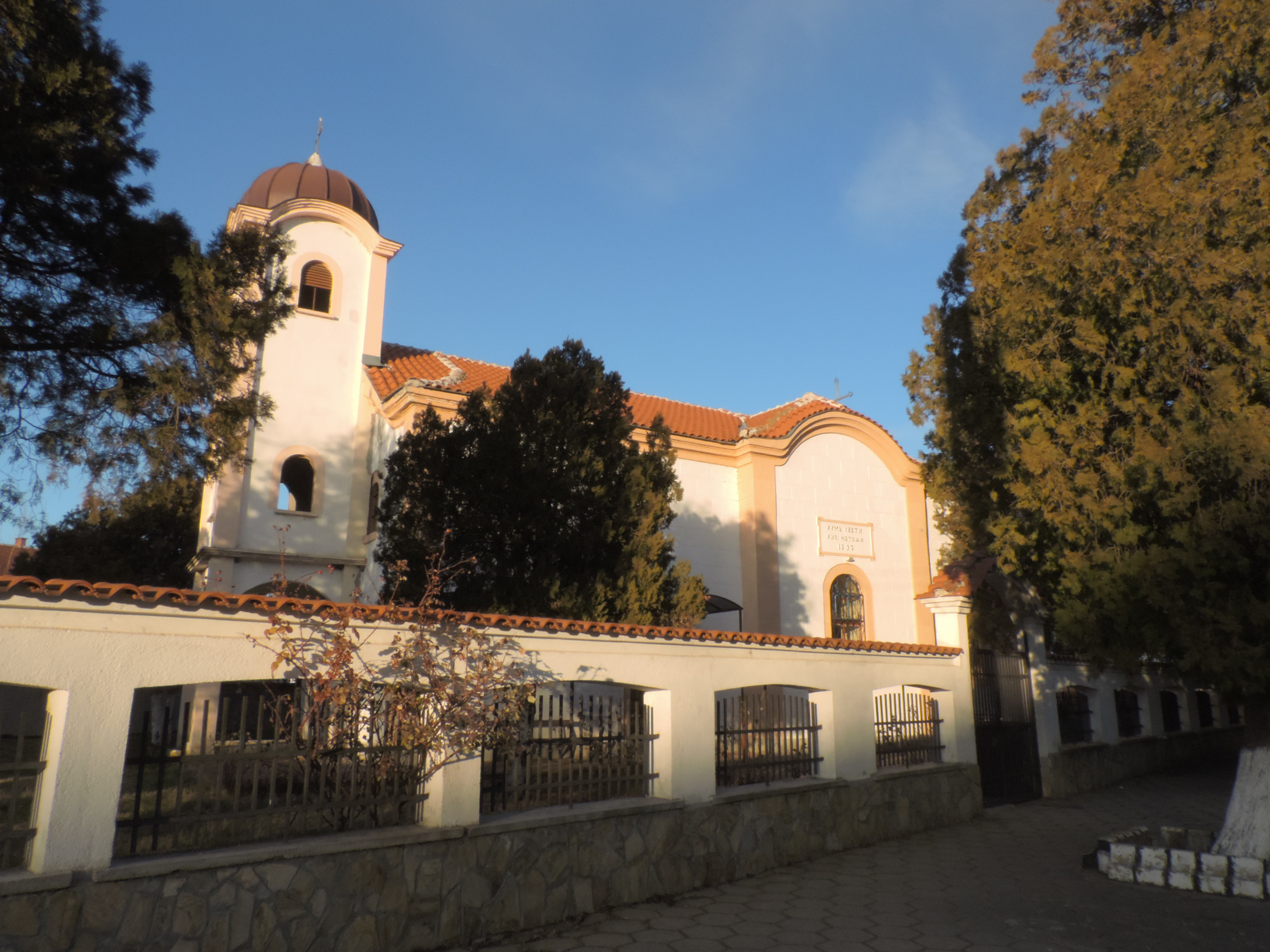

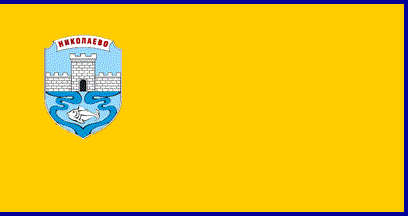
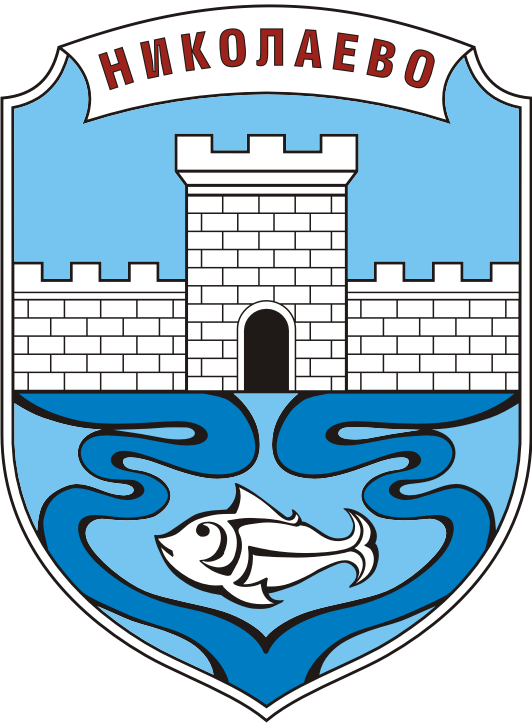
- Flag Coat of arms

- Location of Nikolaevo in Bulgaria
- Coordinates: 42°38′N 25°48′E
- Country: Bulgaria
- Province (Oblast): Stara Zagora

Government
  - Mayor: Konstantin Kostov

Area
  - Total: 14.87 km^{2} (5.74 sq mi)
- Elevation: 274 m (899 ft)

Population (2011)
  - Total: 2,699
- Time zone: UTC+2 (EET)
  - Summer (DST): UTC+3 (EEST)
- Postal Code: 6190
- Area code: 04330

Nikolaevo (Bulgarian: Николаево Bulgarian pronunciation: [nikoˈɫaɛvo]) is a small town in Stara Zagora Province, in central Bulgaria. It is the administrative centre of the homonymous Nikolaevo Municipality. It is situated in the Kazanlak Valley at the foothills of the Balkan Mountains. As of December 2024, the town had a population of 2,564.
