= Tvarditsa, Sliven Province =

Tvarditsa Твърдица
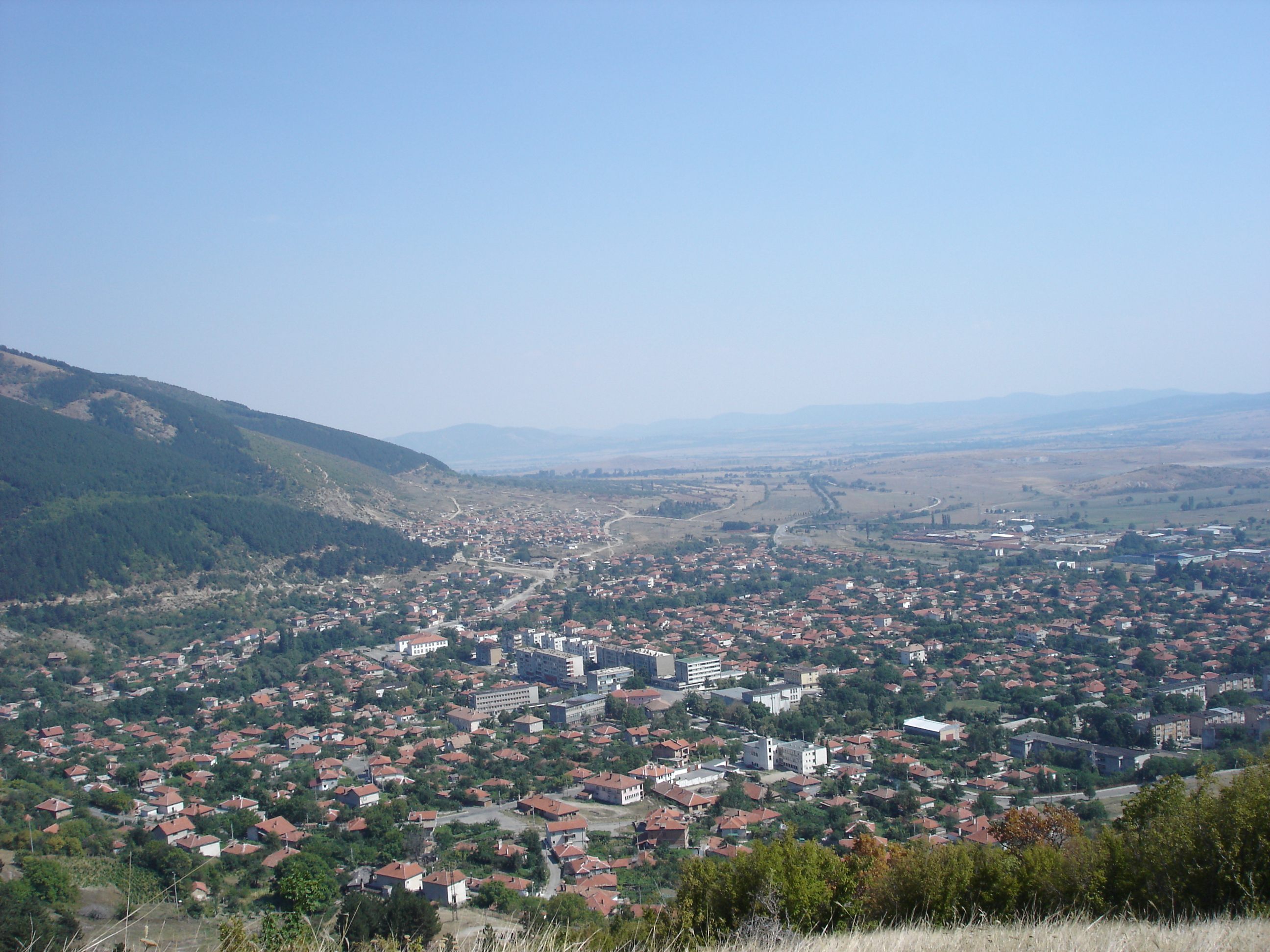
- Overview of Tvarditsa

- Coat of arms

- Location of Tvarditsa, Bulgaria
- Coordinates: 42°42′N 25°54′E
- Country: Bulgaria
- Provinces (Oblast): Sliven

Government
  - Mayor: Maria Gvozdeikova
- Elevation: 396 m (1,299 ft)

Population (2018-12-31)
  - Total: 5,659
- Time zone: UTC+2 (EET)
  - Summer (DST): UTC+3 (EEST)
- Postal Code: 8890
- Area code: 0454
- License plate: CH

Tvarditsa (Bulgarian: Твърдица [tvɐrˈdit͡sɐ]) is a town in Sliven Province, Southeastern Bulgaria. It is the administrative centre of the homonymous Tvarditsa Municipality. As of December 2018, the town had a population of 5,659.

Tvarditsa is located in the Tvarditsa Valley on the southern slopes of Stara Planina. The area around is known as the Tvarditsa Coal Basin, the only place in the country where soft coal is mined.

Tvarditsa Rocks in the South Shetland Islands, Antarctica are named after Tvarditsa. The Bessarabian Bulgarian village of Tvardiţa in Taraclia District, Moldova, was founded by refugees from Tvardisa, who named it after their ancestral town.

== Population ==
As of December 2018, the town of Tvarditsa has 5,659 inhabitants, while the municipality of Tvarditsa has 13,413 inhabitants. Most inhabitants are ethnic Bulgarians (89%), followed by a large Romani minority (9%). The main faith is Orthodox Christianity.

== Gallery ==
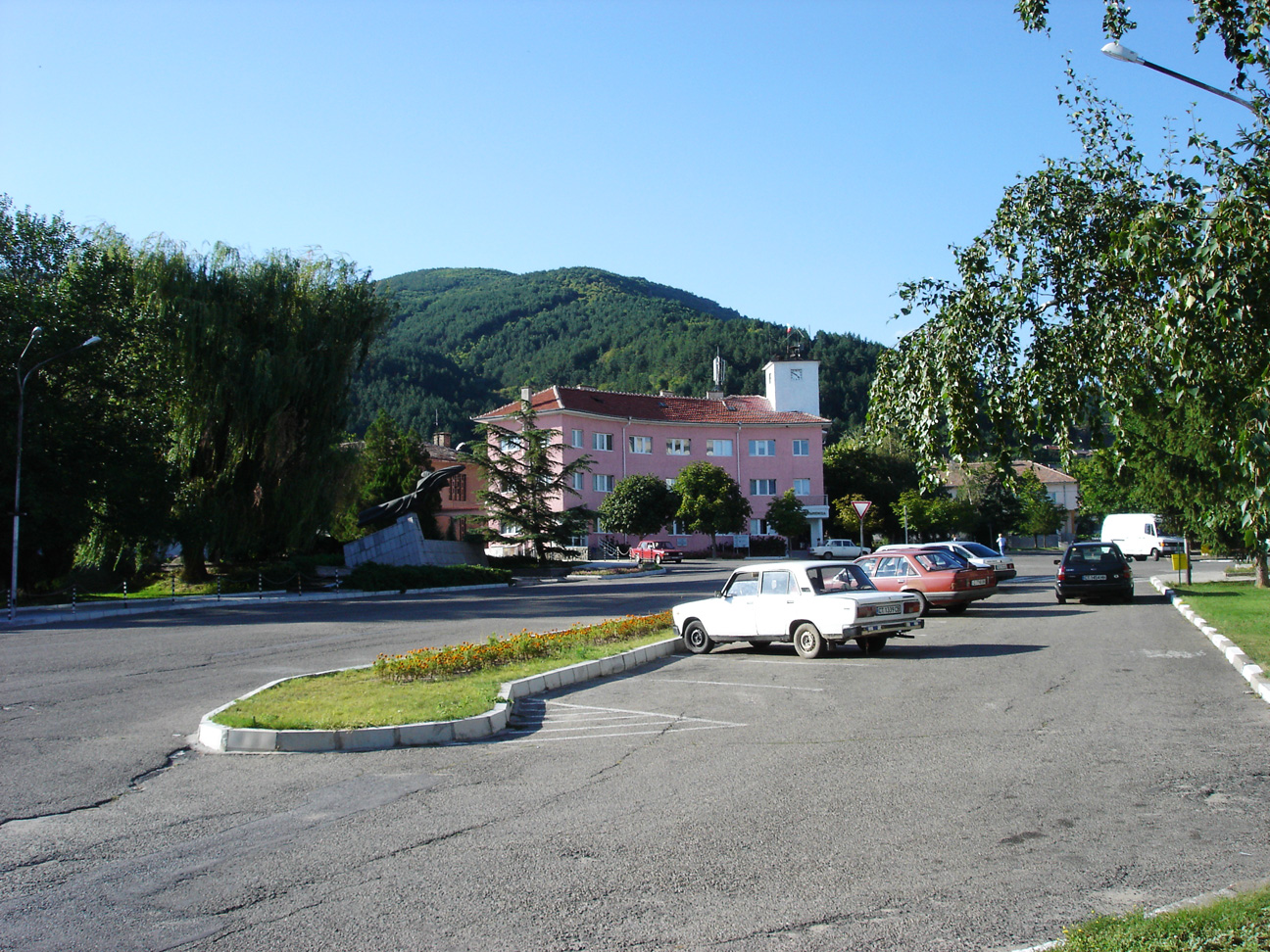
Main square and city hall

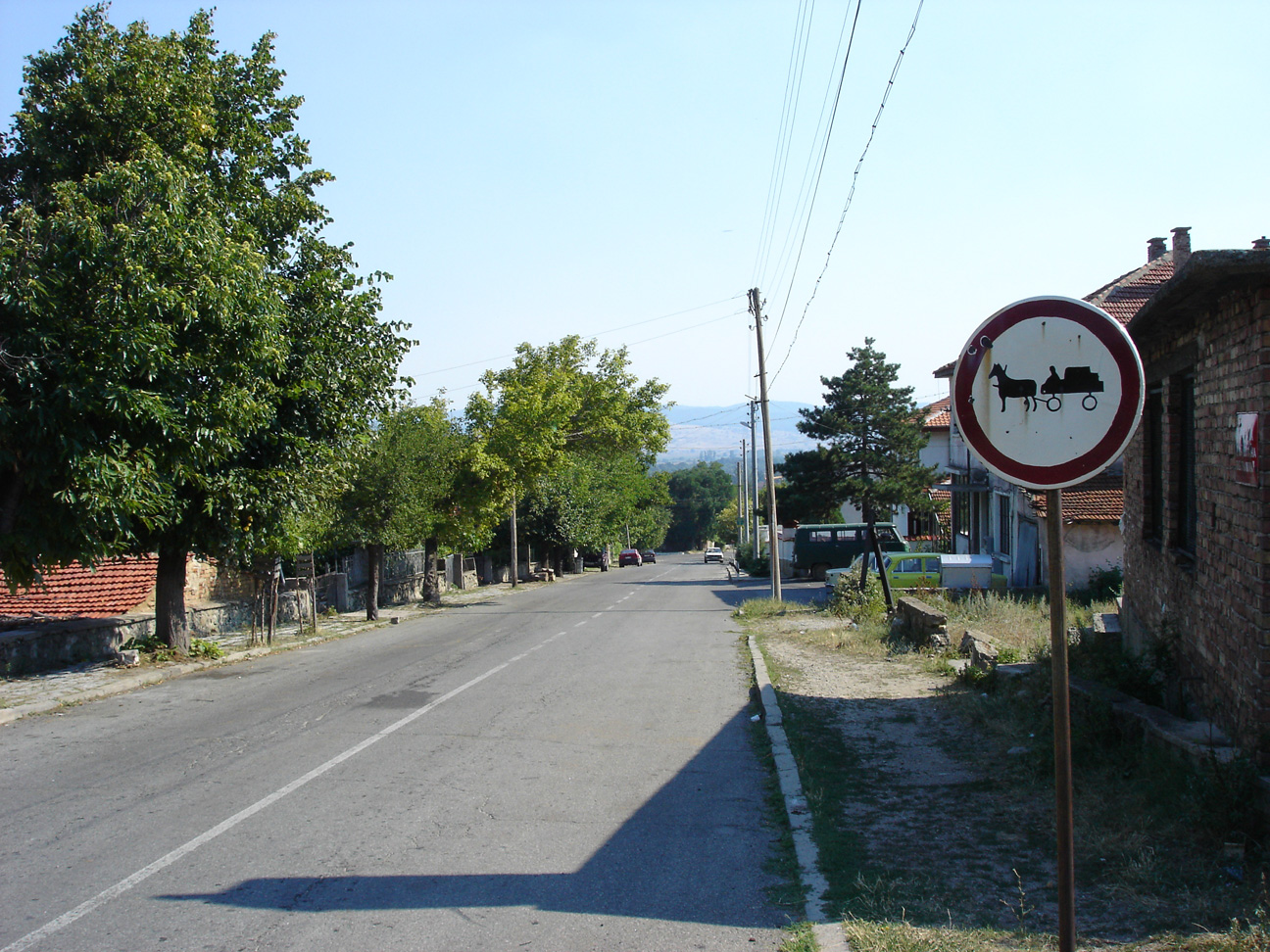
The main road to the Balkan pass

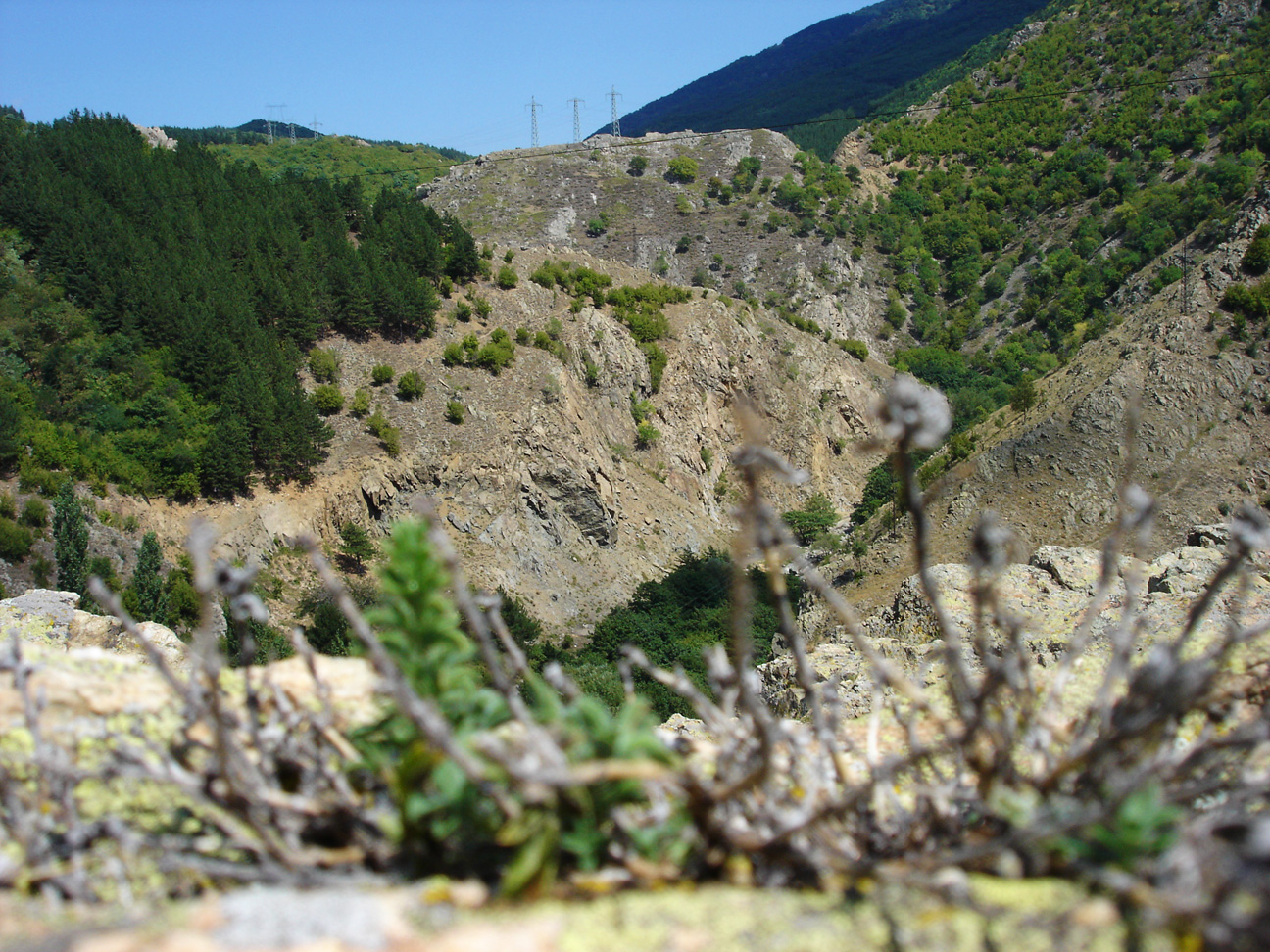
Balkan mountains

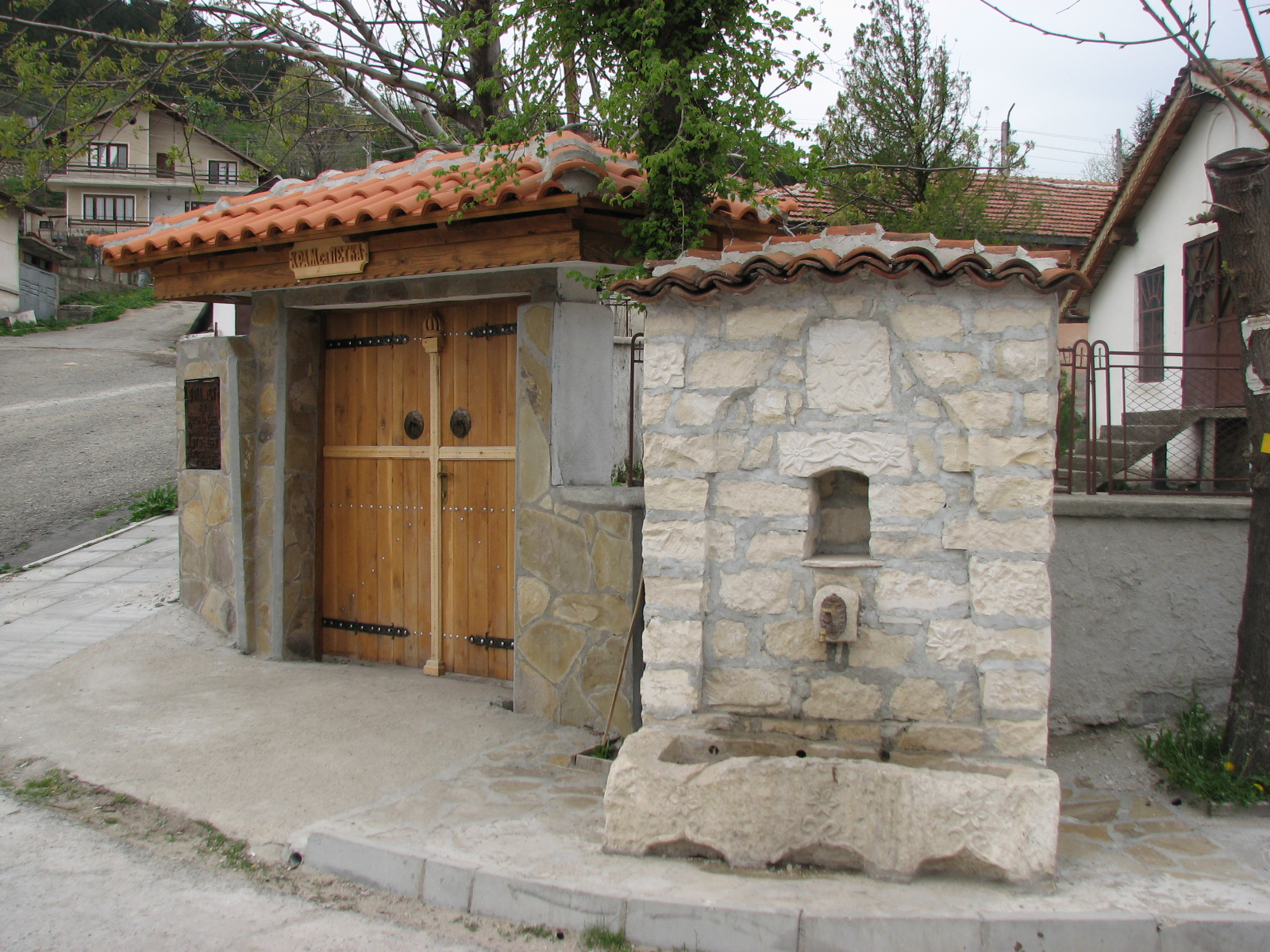
Entrance to the Church of Saint Petka
