= Lyuba Ognenova-Marinova =

Bulgarian underwater archaeologist

- Born: Bulgarian: Люба Левова Огненова; 17 June 1922; Ohrid, Kingdom of Serbs, Croats and Slovenes
- Died: 18 November 2012 (aged 90); Sofia, Bulgaria
- Other names: Luba Ognenova, Lyuba Ognenova, Ljuba Levova Ognenova-Marinova, Luba Ognenova-Marinova, Liubae Ognenova-Marinova
- Occupation: archaeologist
- Years active: 1948-2006
- Known for: Thracian archaeology

Lyuba Ognenova-Marinova (Bulgarian: Люба Левова Огненова-Маринова 1922–2012) was a pioneering Bulgarian archaeologist. She was the first underwater archaeologist in the country and headed the investigations of the ancient Thracian city of Nesebar. She became one of the leading Bulgarian researchers specializing in ancient and Thracian archeology, authoring over 100 scientific publications. She served on the faculty of Sofia University and as a senior researcher at the National Archaeological Museum in Sofia.

== Early life ==
Lyuba Levova Ognenova was born 17 June 1922 into a family of Bulgarian intellectuals in Ohrid, Kingdom of Serbs, Croats and Slovenes. She graduated from a French primary school in Bitola in 1932 and went on to complete her high school training in Tirana. After completing a correspondence course from Rome, she entered the history department of Sofia University, St. Clement Ohridski, graduating in 1946 in classical archaeology.

== Career ==
In 1948, Ognenova began working at the Regional Museum of History in Shumen, as a curator. She conducted excavations with Vera Mavrodinova and Ivanka Zhandova, preparing an inventory of artifacts found at Madara and Preslav, which led to her publication in 1950 of an article Рисунки на конници върху вътрешната крепост на Преслав (Drawings of horsemen on the inner fortress of Preslav). By the end of the year, she accepted a position in the antiquities department of the National Archaeological Museum in Sofia. Assigned to a team to research the site of Sevtopolis under the direction of professor Dimitar P. Dimitrov (Bulgarian: Димитър П. Димитров), Ognenova honed her skill becoming an expert in Thracian research. Sevtopolis, also known as Seuthopolis, was discovered during the construction of the Koprinka Reservoir near Kazanlak in the 1940s and completely unearthed between 1948 and 1954. Though the ancient city was the only Thracian site to ever be fully researched and excavated, the communist regime of the People's Republic of Bulgaria allowed the artificial lake created by the dam to cover the site when excavation was completed. In addition to Ognenova, others on the team included Anna Balkanska, Gergana Canova, Mariya Chichikova and Dimitar Nikolov. In 1957, Ognenova discovered a Thracian religious complex near Babyak, when a television tower was being erected atop Bendida Peak.

Between 1958 and 1963, the work led by Ognenova at the Nesebar site uncovered many significant monuments, including the Temple of Zeus Hiperdeksios, the Botros Temple of Zeus and Hera and others. She also was noted for her epigraphic work with Greek and Latin texts found in Bulgaria. Her study on inscription of the ring found in Ezerovo, and an Illyrian inscription found on a ring from Koman, Albania, allowed Ognenova to conclude that the Illyrian text, despite previous conjectures of its meaninglessness was significant. Tracing the origin of the ring and its shape, she was able to date the ring to the 8th century. Presenting a paper on her findings in Lidice, Czechoslovakia, she caused a sensation and was invited to study from 1959 to 1960 at the École Française d'Athène, one of the archaeological institutes operated by foreign governments in Athens.

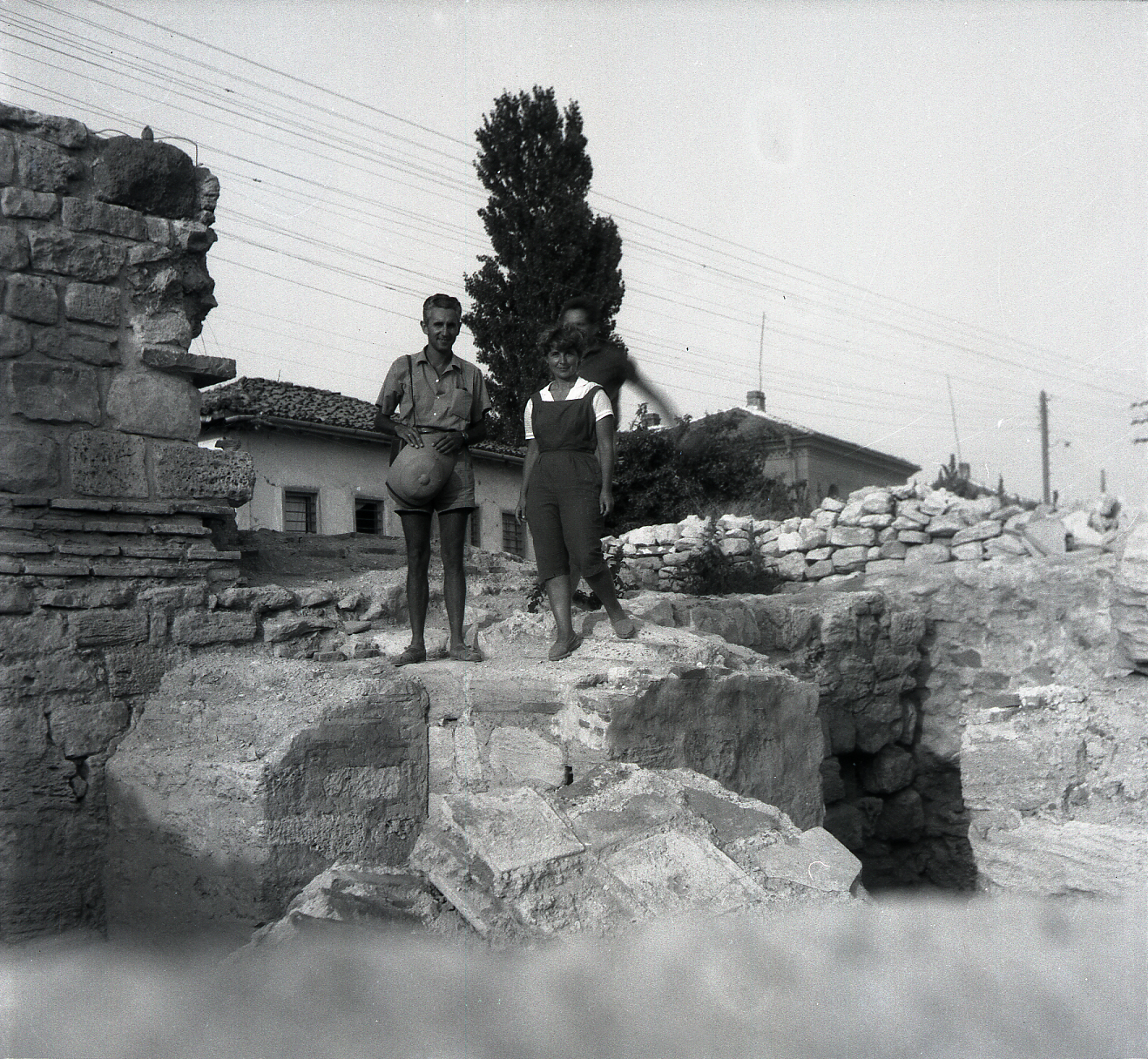
Velizar Velkov and Lyuba Ognenova in Nesebar during the 1960s

In 1961, Ognenova became the country's first archaeological diver while working with professor Velizar Velkov, researching along the Bulgarian Black Sea Coast. Writing about her training, Ognenova said that her dive master overcame her fear of deep water by showing her pottery beneath the water. Her particular areas of interest and expertise focused on Thracian culture between the first and second millennium BC. Ognenova led six underwater archaeological expeditions for the Bulgarian Academy of Sciences (BAS) between 1961 and the early 1970s. Her work led to the identification of five chronological periods of urbanization on the peninsula surrounding Nesebar through the end of the second millennium B.C., which included the Thracian protopolis, the Greek colony Mesambria, a Roman-ruled village to the Early Christian Era, the Medieval settlement and a Renaissance era town, known as Mesemvria or Nessebar. Her research confirmed that earthquakes and flooding had been significant in the area. Studying the artworks, Ognenova became an expert in Greek and Roman art, and interpretations of the various images found on coins. Knowledge of the work of Athenion of Maroneia allowed her to identify that the murals on the Kazanlak Tomb likely originated from his school.

Ognenova returned to diving at Nesebar in 1977, leading eight UNESCO sponsored dives between 1977 and 1984 in which the team found evidence of both Roman and early Byzantine walls and towers. They also identified several acropoles and basilicas of the Medieval period while conducting underwater surveys in the north and south bays of the peninsula in an attempt to locate and clarify the chronology of urban ports along the shore.

After attending the 1980 International Congress of Ancient Bronze Age held in Hungary, Ognenova proposed that the following congress be held in Bulgaria in 1983. She helped organize more than 800 exhibits for the meeting, "Roman Bronze Age Art" from the collections of National Archaeological Institute and Museum of BAS. The exhibit toured abroad in Austria, Germany, India and Syria, before it was shown for a year in Sofia. That same year, Ognenova was made a Senior Fellow of the National Archaeological Institute. She was a longtime member of the scientific councils for the Institute of Archaeology and Institute of Thracology, as well as a lecturer on Thracian archaeology at Sofia University. Ognenova authored more than 100 scientific publications, in varying languages over the course of her career. She created a database of the known sites of Thrace based on a combination of research and interpretation of ancient springs and archaeological artifacts which linked Greece and the eastern Mediterranean to the area. At the time of her death, the work completed in the 1960s, was still the benchmark used to develop the cultural history of Thrace.

== Death and recognition ==
In 1983, after successfully attaining UNESCO World Heritage Site status for Nesebar, Ognenova was made an honorary citizen of the city. In 2005, the National Archaeological Institute and Museum of the BAS in conjunction with the Department of Archaeology at Sofia University, published a volume articles, Heros Hephaistos: Studia in Honorem Lubae Ognenova-Marinova, from the international convention held in 2002 in honor of Ognenova's 80th birthday. The book contained the works of more than 50 scholars reporting on the latest studies and research on her areas of expertise, Thracian and Greco-Roman archaeology, art and religion. She was awarded the Order of Saints Cyril and Methodius in the Second degree for her scientific contributions to Bulgaria. Ognenova died on 18 November 2012 in Sofia.

== Selected works ==
- Огненова, Люба (1958). "Илирийският" надпис от Северна Албания (in Bulgarian). Sofia, Bulgaria: Българска Академия На Науките (Bulgarian Academy of Sciences).
- Venedikov, Ivan; Ognenova-Marinova, Ljuba (1969). Nessebre I (in French). Sofia, Bulgaria: Éditions de l'Académie bulgare des sciences. OCLC 174343739.
- Ognenova-Marinov, Ljuba (1975). Statuettes en bronze du Musée National Archéologique à Sofija: statuettes de culte (in French). Sofia, Bulgaria: Éditions de l'Académie bulgare des sciences. OCLC 2963512.
- Velkov, Velizar; Ognenova-Marinova, Ljuba; Šimbuleva, Žana (1987). Mesambria–Mesemvria–Nessebur (in Bulgarian). Sofia, Bulgaria: Svyat. OCLC 247486254.
- Ognenova-Marinova, Liubae; Preshlenov, Christo (2004). "Past and Future of the Underwater Archaeological Research in Nesebar, Bulgaria". In Maniscalco, Fabio (ed.). Tutela, conservazione e valorizzazione del patrimonio culturale subacqueo (2nd ed.). Napoli, Italia: Massa. pp. 263–269. ISBN 88-87835-50-0.
- Ognenova-Marinova, Lyuba; et al. (2005). Nessebre, III (in Bulgarian). Burgas, Bulgaria: Spring Ltd. ISBN 978-95-49159-547.
- Огненова-Маринова, Люба (30 October 2009). "Как Започнаха Подводните Археологически Проучвания В Несебър" [What started underwater archaeological research in Nessebar]. Morski Vestnik (in Bulgarian). Varna, Bulgaria: Morski Svyat Publishing House. Archived from the original on 14 April 2016.
