= Valley of the Thracian Rulers =

Terminology for Kazanlak Valley

Coordinates: 42°35′0″N 25°32′42″E

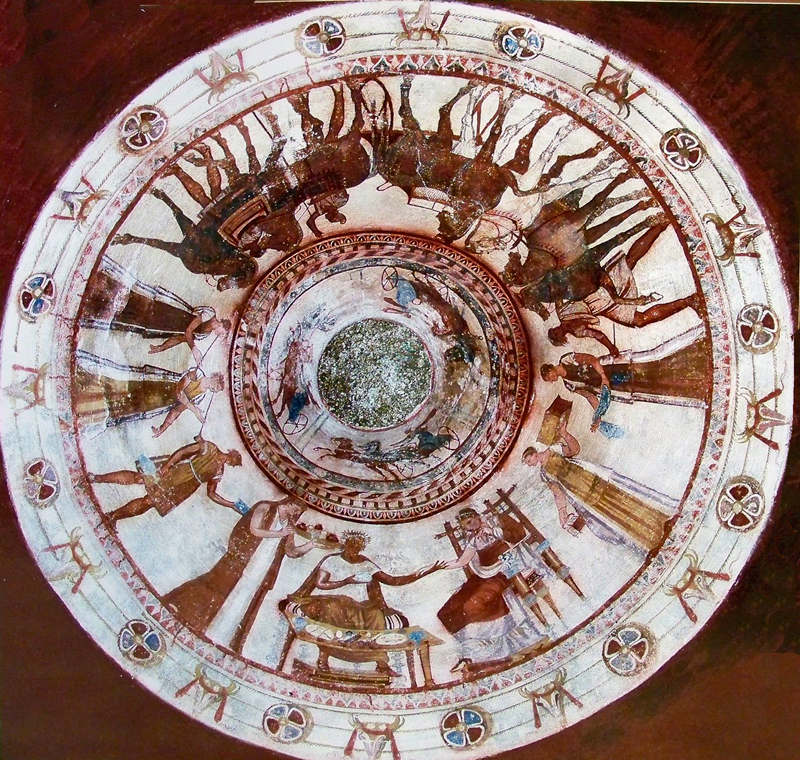
Reproduction of the Thracian Tomb of Kazanlak

The Valley of the Thracian Rulers (Bulgarian: Долина на тракийските владетели, romanized: Dolina na trakiĭskite vladeteli) is a name which was made popular by the archaeologist Georgi Kitov and describes the extremely high concentration and variety of monuments of the Thracian culture in the Kazanlak Valley in central Bulgaria, also known as the Rose Valley. It is believed that there are over 1500 tumuli in the region, with only 300 being researched so far.

The Kazanlak Tomb was discovered in 1944. Between 1948 and 1954 the ancient town of Seuthopolis was studied. Between the 1960s and the 1980s people made researches of the mound necropolis which belonged to residents of Sevtopolis. Another two brick tombs were found there. The Maglizh and Kran tombs were discovered in 1965. The 60s also marked the research of Thracian tombs from the Roman era in the regions of the villages of Tulovo and Dabovo, made by Prof. L. Getov. During the 70s M. Domaradski, Ph. D., researched a habitation and its surrounding necropolis in the Atanastsa region, village of Tazha.

The period between 1992 and 2006, with short interruptions, marked the research made by Senior Research associate G. Kitov, Ph. D., and the expedition TEMR (Thracian Expedition for Mound Research) led by him. As a result of their activity over 200 mounds, which represent funeral practices of the Thracians during the Iron and Roman Eras in the Kazanlak Valley, were studied. Among all the monuments one can distinguish over 15 tombs in a different stage of preservation, 3 masonry graves, a lot of rich funerals, etc.

In recent years, work by archaeologists has been going on successfully with the research of tombs near the villages of Dolno Izvorovo and Buzovgrad.

== Seuthopolis ==
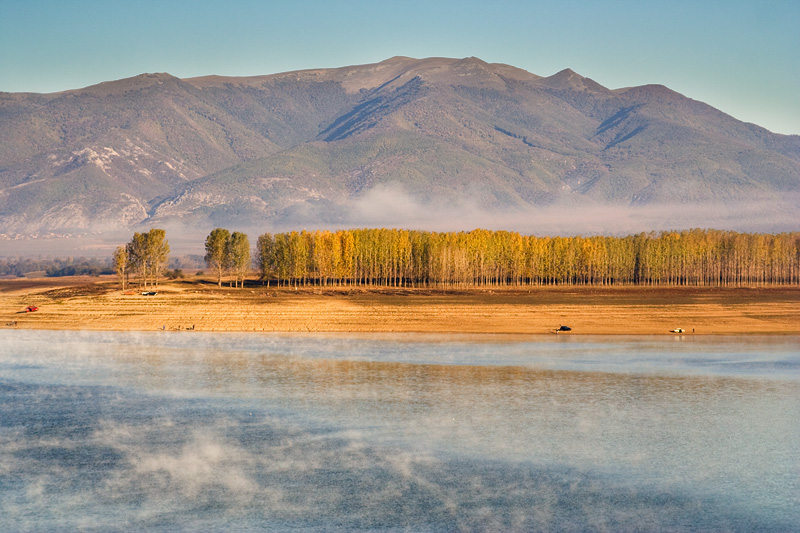
Koprinka Reservoir, the site of Seuthopolis

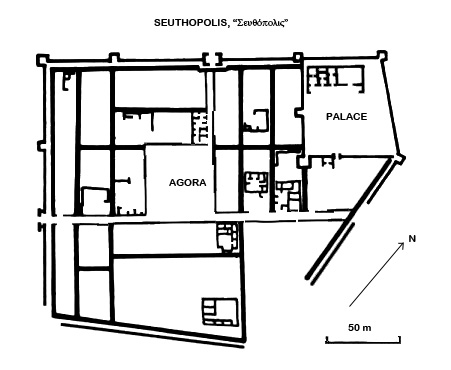
Seuthopolis city plan

The city was situated on a low terrace downstream the Tundzha river which surrounded it to the South and South-West, while the town was surrounded to the East by the Goliama Varovita river, a feeder of the Tunzdha river. Sevtopolis was found during construction works of the Koprinka Reservoir (former Georgi Dimitrov dam), with research taking place between 1948 and 1954. Excavation works were led by Prof. D. P. Dimitrov and Prof. M. Chichikova. The city now lies at the bottom of the lake.

Sevtopolis has an irregular pentagonal form and is situated over a surface of 50 decares. Its fortress wall is 890 meters long with rectangular towers and bastions being located along it, mainly to the North-West and North-East. The wall is 2 meter thick with a fundament of crushed stones, while the superstructure was made of adobe leveled by wooden beams.

The town construction was done at a single stage while preserving the principles of orthogonal design (the so-called “Hippodamus system”). The two gates were located to the North-West and South-West and represented a starting point of the main streets which crossed each other under right angle at the square (the “Agora” Greek άγορά). Another street was used to pass through the inner side, along the whole fortress wall. The town was equipped with a water and sewerage system while several wells satisfied the citizens’ needs for fresh water. The Agora took central place and, according to Sevtopolis’ sign, Dionysius's sanctuary was situated there. All important social buildings were situated around the Agora.

The Northern sector of the town contains the citadel, surrounded by an independent fortress wall, also reinforced by towers. A monumental entrance – propylon (Greek πρόπυλον) represented the transition to the inner yard. To the far side of the yard there was a representative building which was identified as one of the King's residences. It had a wide antechamber, probably with a colonnade, behind which there was a big hall of rendering, colored in the so-called “structural style”, and residence sectors. It is believed that ordinary citizens lived beyond the fortress walls where workshops were also located. An indirect proof of that are numerous artifacts found during the excavation works of the town – ceramic materials, various instruments for stone processing, wood processing and metal processing.

A significant portion of all goods were imported – amphora tare, imported Greek ceramics, luxury goods, coins, etc. The most common were stamps from Thassos island, followed by stamps from Sinope, Rhodes and Chios. Black-firnis ceramics are a proof of connections to the coastal areas. As far as coins are concerned – they represented Macedonian rulers (Philip II, Alexander III, Cassander, Lysimach, etc.) together with single coins from towns such as Messambria, Apollonia Pontica, Enos, Lysimachia.

The town's coin production is entirely dynastical, i.e. it belongs to the town's founder Seuthes III. The small par of the coins is a proof that they served the local coin circulation, while the range in which those coins were used, defines the territories controlled by Seuthes III.

The town existed for a relatively short period of time – from the beginning of the last quarter of the 4th century BC to the middle of the 3rd century BC, while there is also some evidence that its existence continued a little longer.

Simultaneously with the research of the town, excavation works of the nearby mound necropolis in the Nine Mounds area and partial excavation works of the surrounding flat necropolises were also performed. Results from those excavation works provide important evidence about specific features of the Thracians’ funeral rituals, in particular – about the funeral rituals of Sevtopolis’ inhabitants.

== Tomb of Seuthes III ==
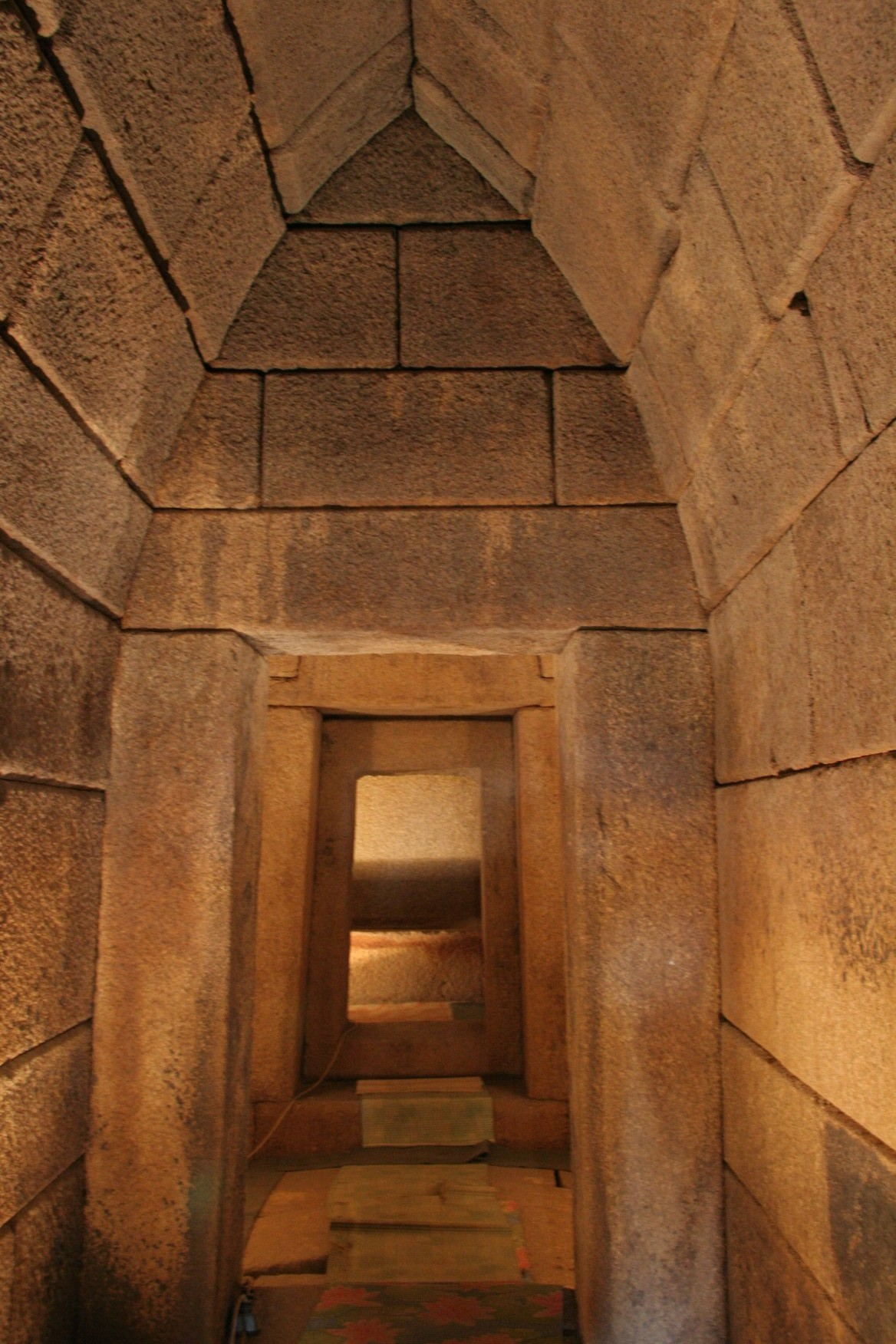
Tomb of Seuthes III

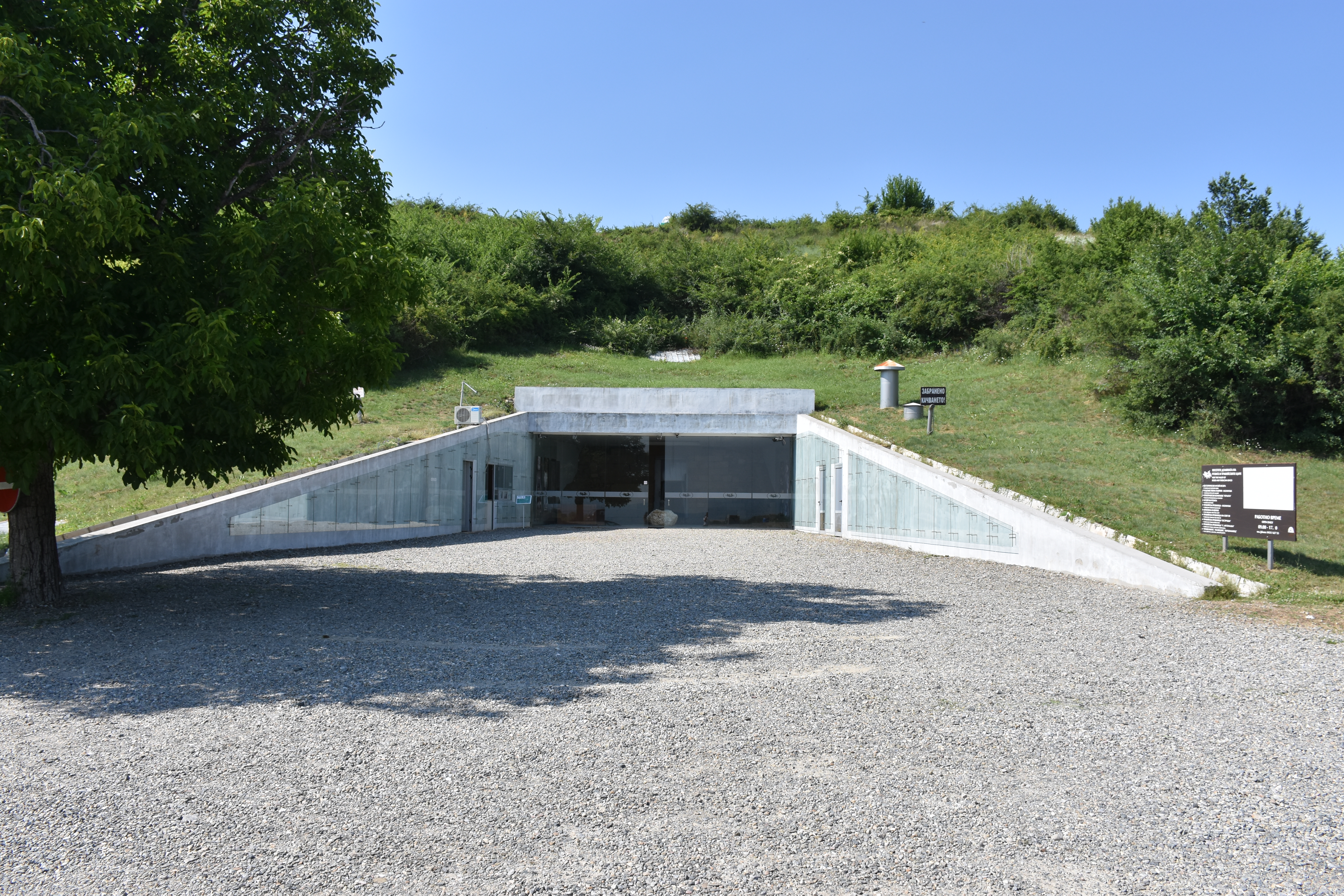
Tomb of Seuthes III

The monument in Golyama Kosmatka mound was found in the autumn of 2004 during regular archaeological excavations, performed by TEMP-expedition led by Georgi Kitov.

Seuthes III was the King of the Odrysian Kingdom of Thrace from c. 331-300 BC.

The mound was piled up as a sacred hill in the first half of the 5th century BC. Probably in the second half of the century a monumental temple was built, consisting of a representative façade and three rooms - a rectangular one with a double-pitch coverage, a round one with a dome-shaped coverage and a sarcophagus-like chamber, made of a 60 t granite block.

At the beginning of 3rd century BC in the central chamber the building was transformed into a tomb for a Thracian aristocrat. In the first chamber a horse sacrifice was made.

At the façade a 13m long corridor with stone walls and a wooden roof were built. On closing the tomb the corridor was burnt down and filled with mound earth deposits. 7m to the south of the entrance there is a head of a bronze statue - probably a portrait of a Seuthes III.

The inventory is exceptionally rich, presenting personal and grave goods made of gold, silver, bronze, alabaster, glass, clay, leather. Among the findings three subjects were of special interest – a bronze helmet, a silver jug and a silver cup, upon which one can read the name ΣΕΥΘΟΥ / the name of Seuthes/. This fact, the finding of three bronze coins with the image of Seuthes III at the beginning of the corridor and the extraordinary similarity of the bronze head with the images on the coins of this Thracian ruler are the reasons why the discoverer G. Kitov makes the assumption that this is the tomb of the founder of Sevtopolis.

== Kazanlak tomb ==
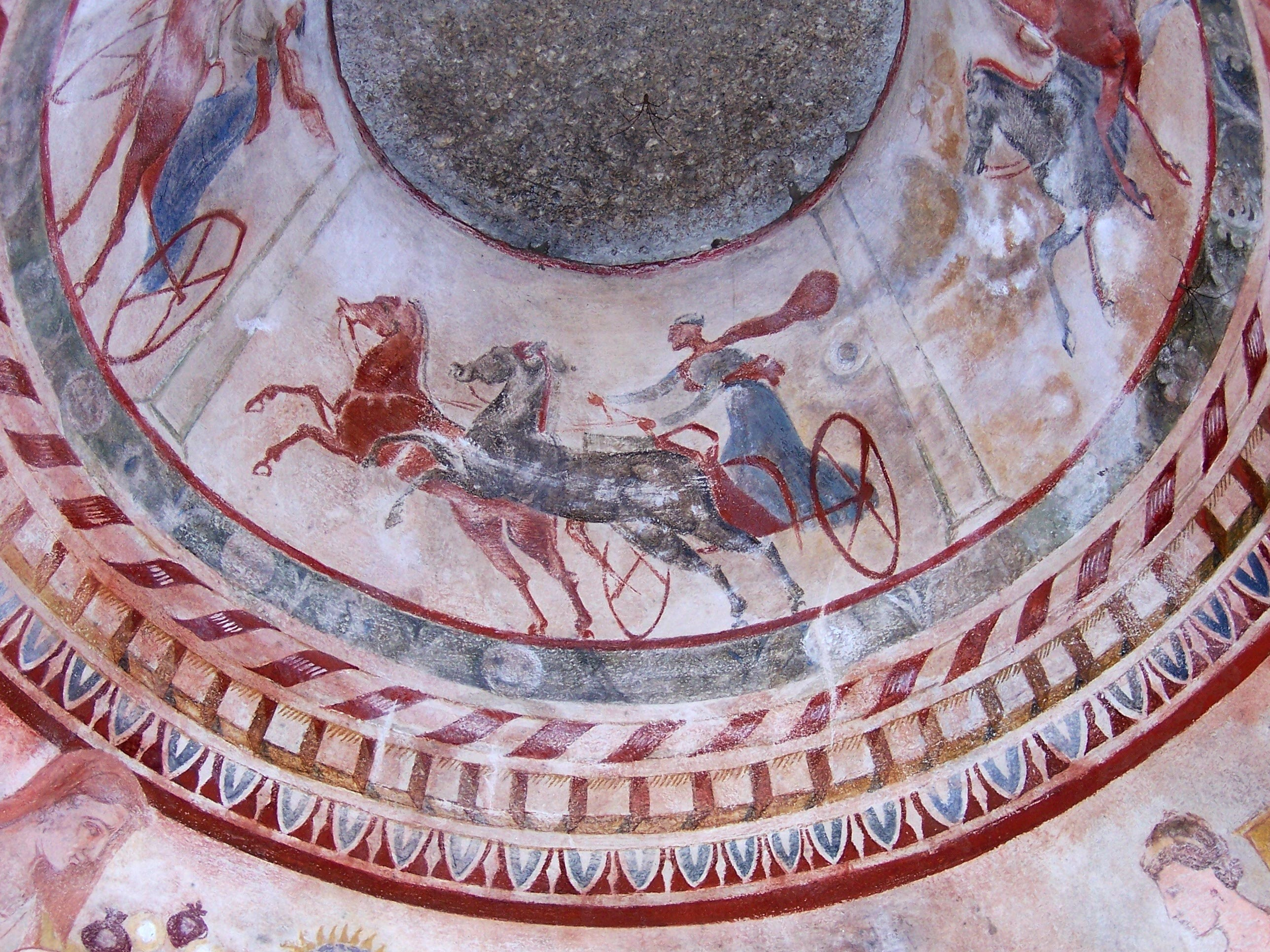
The Thracian Tomb of Kazanlak

The Kazanlak Tomb was found accidentally on 19 April 1944 by soldiers who were digging for entrenchment against aircraft. The Tomb was constructed on the same level as the surrounding terrain and is oriented to the north–south direction with its entrance to the South. It consists of a corridor, a rectangular pre-funeral chamber and a circular funeral chamber.

The scheme, construction, style and technique of the wall paintings, as well as the objects found nearby date the Kazanlak Tomb back to the first half of 3rd century BC.

The common concept between the architecture and the wall paintings, the painters’ unique style and workmanship have turned the Kazanlak Tomb into one of the masterpieces of Thracian art and the antique cultural heritage. In 1979 the Tomb was pronounced a monument of global significance and was put under UNESCO’s custody.

== Maglizh tomb ==
The tomb was found and studied in the summer 1965 by Prof. L. Getov. It consists of a small antechamber, flanked at both sides by a single rectangular premise, a long two-sector corridor (dromos Greek Δρόμος), two rectangular sections and a funeral chamber.

The funeral chamber and its constructively connected II compartment were built from bricks, while the rest of the premises were built from crushed stones of various dimensions, which were connected to each other with mud solution. While the roof construction of the corridor and the I compartment were made of wooden beams, the II compartment and the chamber had a fake arch formed by the sloping of the internal surfaces of the bricks. At the far side of the funeral chamber there are remains from a broken brick funeral bed. The walls of the premises were plastered with clay coating that has absorbed a huge amount of moisture with time which, in turns, has led to the disappearance of most of the wall paintings. On the Eastern wall of premise II there is a frieze part, which consists of rhythmically alternating four palmettes and three amphorae. Upon each amphora one can see Nike, the victory Goddess, standing on a chariot (“biga” from Latin bīga) and galloping to the left. On the triangular section above the funeral chamber's entrance one can see images of arms objects – a quiver with a bow and arrows which has a freely falling mantle from its upper end.

The tomb was long used as a family tomb, the proof of which comes in the form of additional reconstructions and amendments both to the scheme, and the decorations. It dates back to the middle of the 3rd century BC.

== Ostrusha ==
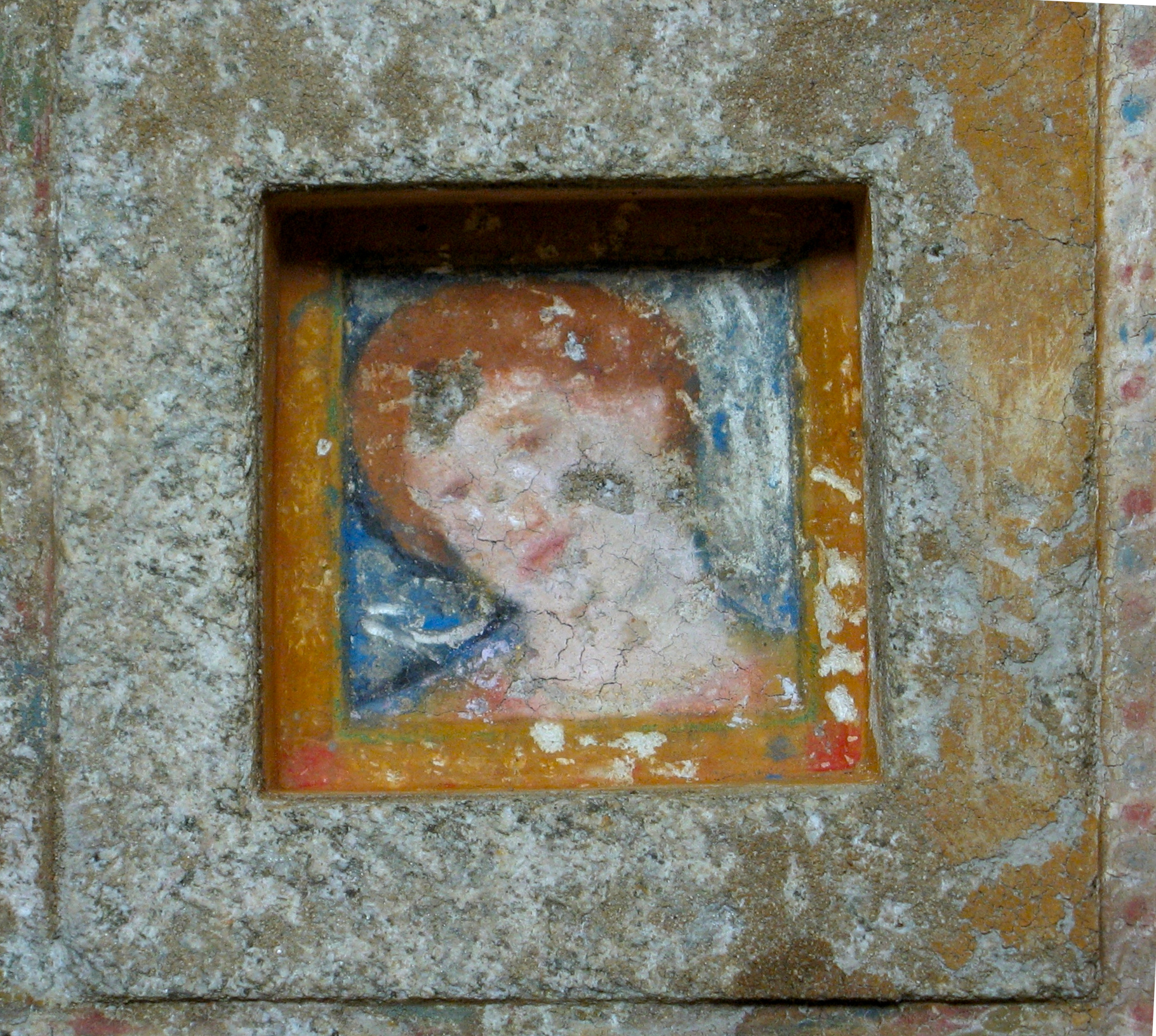
Ostrusha - view of a woman face in the central chamber

The facilities under the mound were discovered in 1993 and represent a funeral-cult complex expanded on a surface of 100 square meters. They consist of six premises, one of which is a sarcophagus-like chamber. Under the complex there was a ritual piling of a lot of crushed ceramic utensils and architectural details.

Three different periods of utilization of the facilities were defined. The first period dates back to the middle of the 4th century BC when a monolithic chamber with a funeral bed and roof paintings was mounted over a stereobat of huge stone plates. The latter had a cassette-like construction on three levels. All sections were decorated with wall paintings in blue, red, yellow and green. The central circle was covered with golden foil, while the rest of the sections were painted with scenes of human and animal images as well as plant and geometrical ornaments.

At a later stage, the remaining 5 premises were built to the central chamber. During the third period at the end of the century a sarcophagus-like grave was built in front of the entrance while no funeral took place in it. It was probably at that time when the trizna (remains of commemoration eating/table) in front of the facilities was performed. Finally, the complex was buried. Its raid took place in the 4th century AD and it was probably at that time when most of the wall paintings were destroyed with the South-Western chamber remaining the only one to be intact.

== Golyama Arsenalka ==
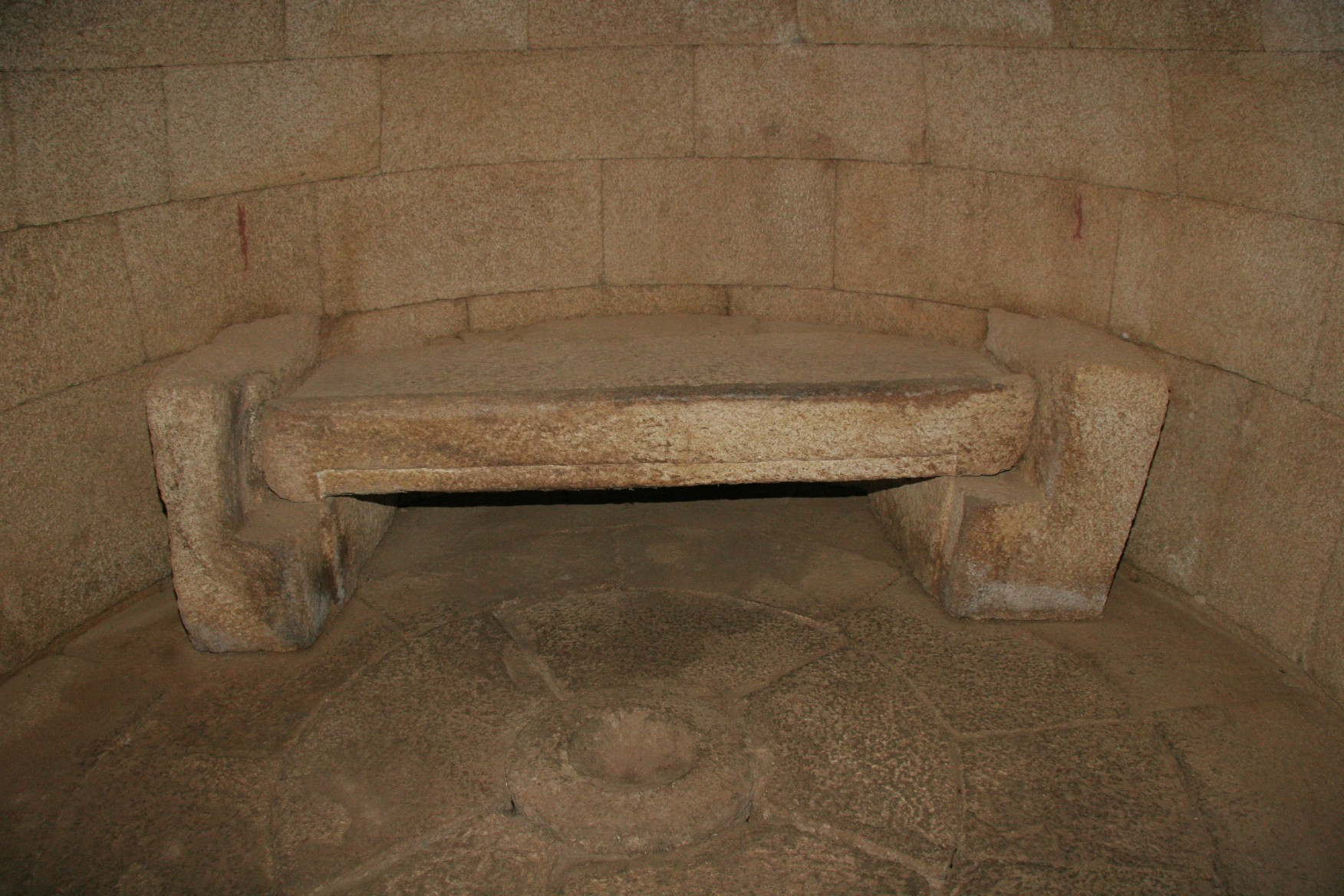
Golyama Arsenalka - view of the tomb

The mound is situated 2 km to the South-West of the town of Shipka. The tomb was found after preliminary geophysical research on 31 August 1995 during regular archaeological excavations under Senior Research Assistant Georgi Kitov, Ph. D.

The tomb consists of a façade and two chambers, with the entrance pointing to the South. The façade was built from eight rows of processed granite blocks. The entrance was equipped with a two-wing stone door.

The first chamber has a rectangular form and was also built from granite blocks. The floor was built from compressed soil, while the roof is double-pitched.

In the central circular chamber vaulting begins from the second row. The walls were built from 11 block rows. The vault ends with a horizontal key stone. The floor has 28 stone plates, lined into three concentric fasciae around a circular stone block. The chamber's entrance was equipped with a two-wing stone door, lacunared from the inside.

A stone bed was built against the entrance and perpendicular to it.

The tomb was raided in ancient times. A horse was buried in the first chamber while its bones were disarranged during the raids. Individual archaeological materials, which were found there – golden, bronze and iron objects – date the funeral back to the middle or the second half of the 4th century BC.

== Sashova mound ==
The mound is situated 4 km to the west of the town of Shipka. A non-raided Thracian tomb was found in the mound on 24 August 1995 during regular archaeological excavations under Senior Research Assistant Georgi Kitov, PhD.

It consists of a corridor and two chambers with the entrance pointing to the South-East. The corridor was built from river and crushed stones, at two construction stages.

The first chamber has a rectangular form by plan. The walls and the roof were built from well processed white, black, red and green limestone and granite blocks. The roof has three levels. The floor was built from compressed soil.

The central chamber is situated transversely to the axis line, it has a rectangular form and half-cylinder cover. Vaulting begins after the fifth row.

A primitive stone bed was built to the left of the entrance. Upon it one can find remains from a man's funeral executed through body laying. The inventory consists of over 50 objects made of gold, silver, bronze, iron and clay. A horse was buried in the North-Eastern half of the chamber.

Stylized images of warriors were deeply cut into the sides of the central chamber's entrance.

The plan and the space formation are proofs of a combination of various construction traditions while the archaeological materials allow the chamber funeral to be dated back to the first half of the 2nd century BC.

== Sarafova mound (Kran II) ==
The mound is situated 7 km to the South of the town of Shipka. The tomb was found on 27 September 1995 during regular archaeological excavations under Senior Research Assistant Georgi Kitov, Ph. D.

The tomb consists of a corridor and two rectangular chambers. The corridor was built from stone blocks covered with colored lime plaster. It had a double-pitch roof covered with tiles which has collapsed and piled the sacrificed horse on the floor. The tomb's façade is also covered with colorful horizontal fasciae.

The two chambers were built from bricks, the floors were built from lime plaster while the walls were covered with a thick layer of rendering upon which one can find formed colorful fasciae in white, red and black. The side walls narrow steadily and end in a sharp-edge arch. The contours of common premises are repeated at the entrances to both chambers.

The entrance to the second chamber is closed by a single-wing stone door, lacunared from the inside. The tomb was raided in ancient times and several small findings allow it to be dated back to the second half of the 4th century BC.

== Helvetia mound ==
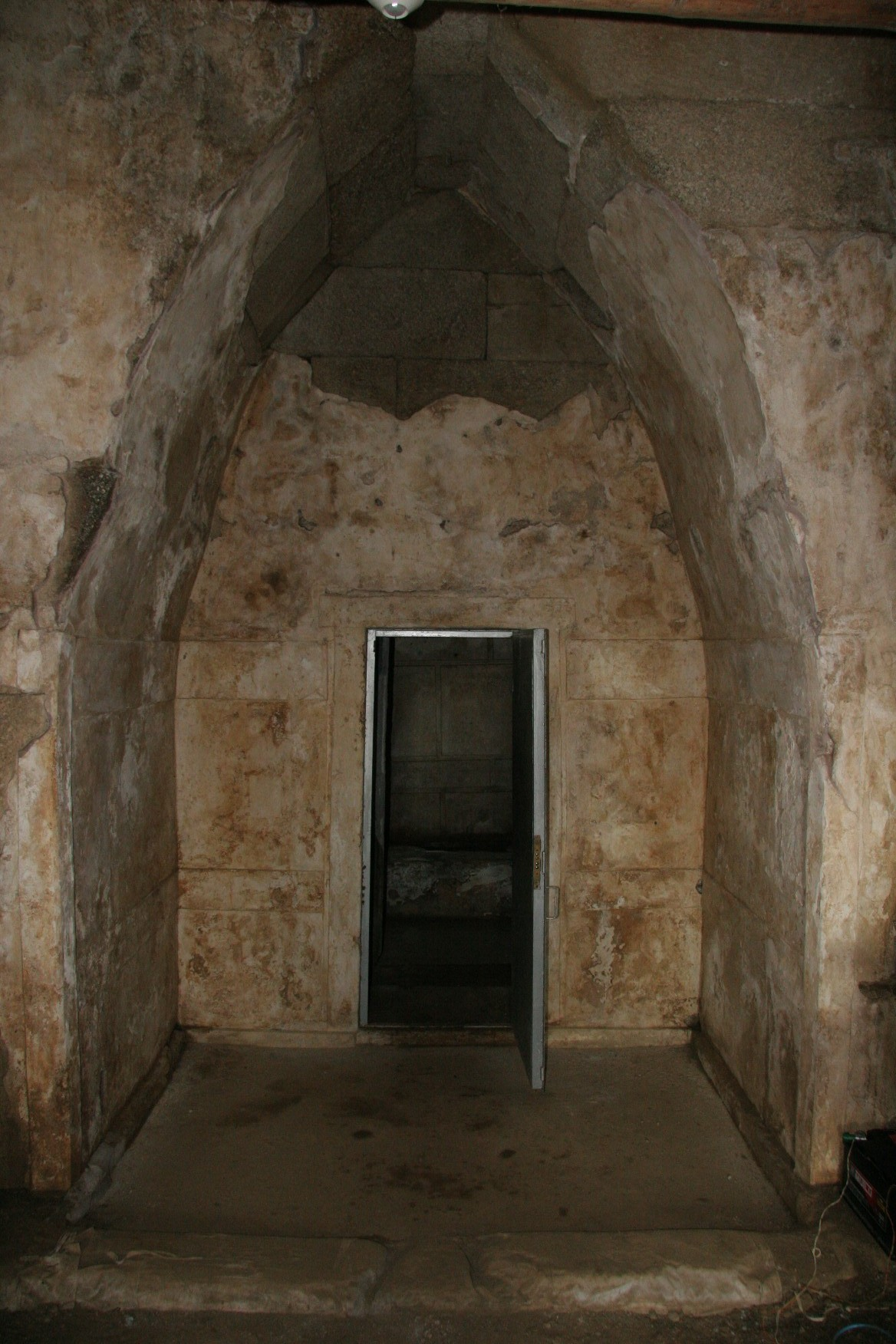
Helvetia - entrance to the tomb

The mound is located 0.5 km southeast of the town of Shipka. The tomb was discovered on 28 July 1996 during regular archaeological excavations led by Senior Research Associate Georgi Kitov, Ph. D.

The tomb consists of a long, wide corridor, an antechamber and a rectangular chamber.

The Dromos (Greek Δρόμος) was built from different-sized crushed and processed stones based on mud soldering and contacts with the façade by a joint. Its floor and the floors of both rooms are covered with thick lime plaster whose level shows an appreciable slope of the southeast exit.

The antechamber and the chamber are completely and perfectly preserved. They have a common spatial solution and uniform construction - large, well-processed blocks, soldered with lead inundated iron clamps. The walls are covered with thick lime plaster - an imitation of stone construction by means of deep horizontal and vertical grooves. The plastering refers at least to two construction periods. The walls are vertical up to a certain height, followed by a double-pitched, slightly curved coverage, which is interrupted by a horizontal fascia.

At the bottom of the burial chamber a ritual bed is adhered, which is made from small stones and plastered the same way as the walls. Each of the lateral walls has a stone bench. The access to the central room is through an inward opening two-winged lacunar stone door.

The tomb was robbed way back in ancient times. In the antechamber a horse skeleton in anatomical order was discovered. Another horse skeleton was found in front of the corridor's east wall head. The monument dates back to the 4th century BC.

== Griffons’ mound ==
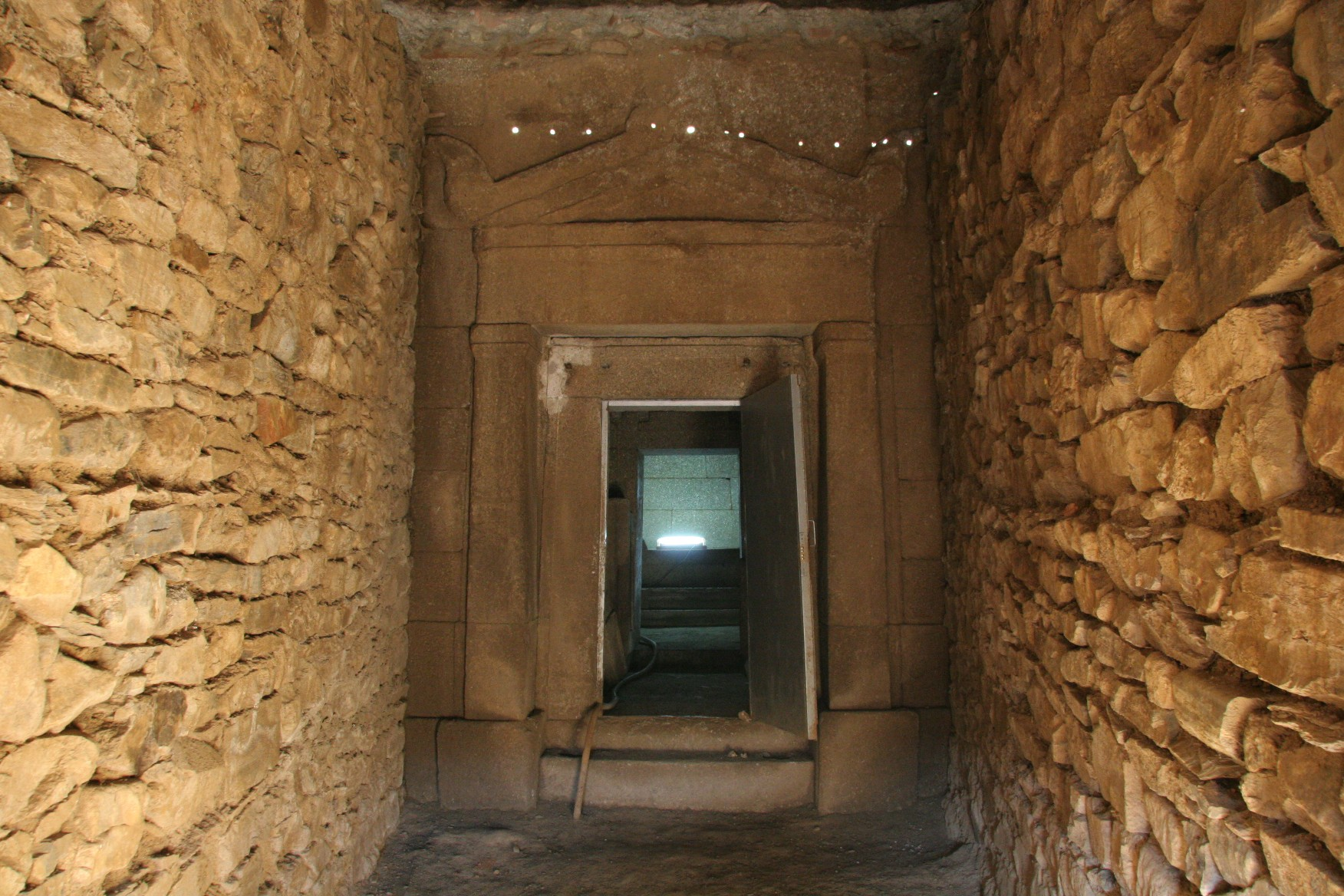
Griffins - entrance to the tomb

The Griffons’ (Greek γρύφων) mound is located 0.5 km southeast of the town of Shipka. The tomb was discovered on 18.08.1996 during regular archaeological excavations led by Senior Research Associate Georgi Kitov, PhD. It consists of a long corridor and two chambers, has an imposing façade and fake raised pediment located above the entrance to the first chamber. The façade is facing to the South-East, its lateral edges are hidden by additional clinging of the corridor's sides, which shows two construction periods. During these periods it was opened, over the façade there was a shed or a hood, made from flat and curved tiles.

The first chamber is rectangular with a double-pitch coverage, while the second one is round with a dome-shaped coverage. The entrances to both chambers are equipped with outward opening double-wing stone doors. The floors of both rooms are covered with thick lime plaster.

In the round chamber there are large plates on the floor towards the side walls - platforms. The stone ritual bed is made precisely and on the front plate there is a plastically represented wedge. In front of the bed there is a rolling stone block with a profiled face.

The facility was robbed in ancient times. During the excavations two gold beads and unusual fragments, made of silver and bronze, were found. It dates back to the 4th century BC.

== Shushmanets temple ==
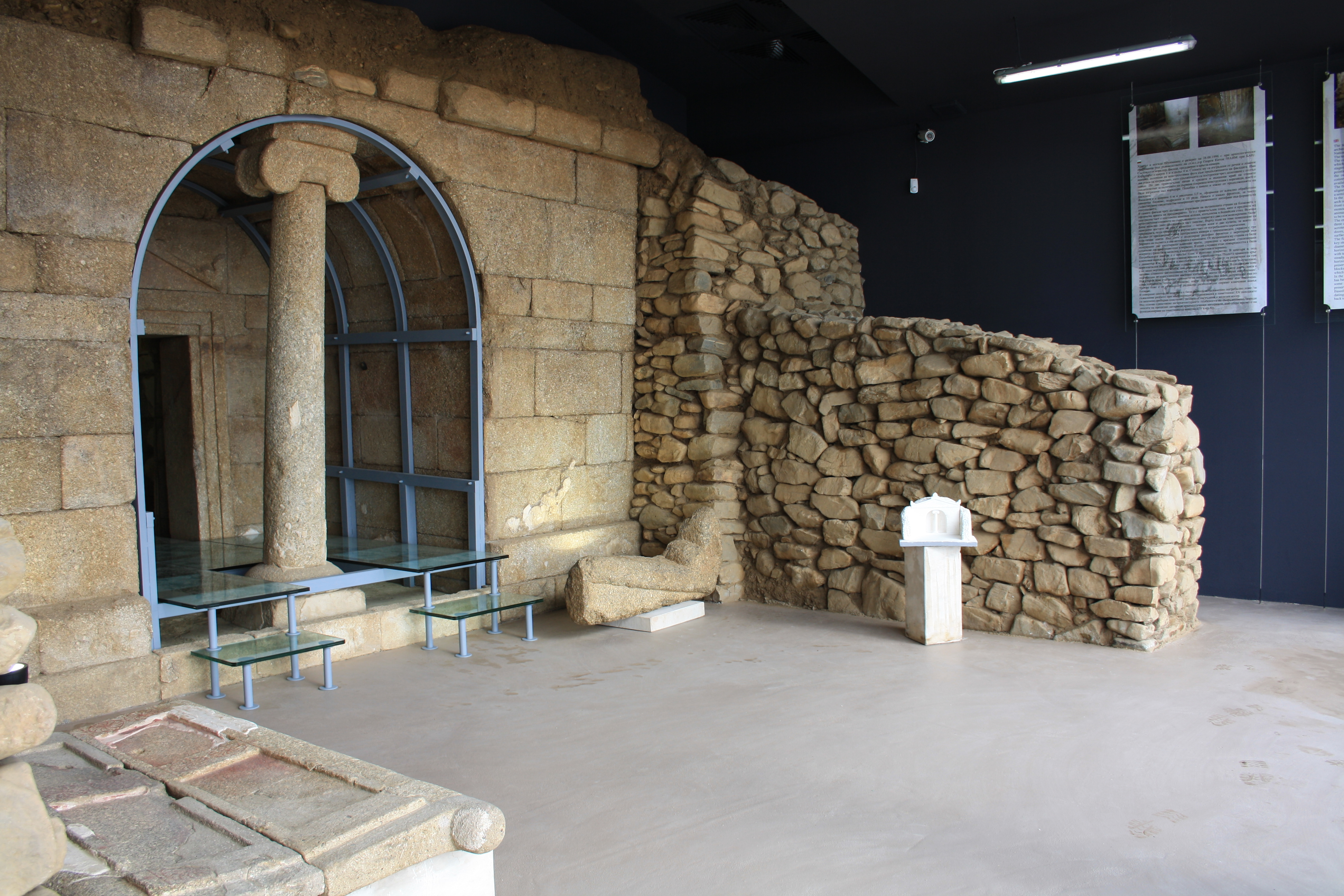
Shushmanets temple - inside view

The temple in the Shushmanets mound was discovered on 28 August 1996.

The temple consists of a corridor, a façade, an antechamber and a circular chamber. It was built in a previously mound earth-deposits.

The corridor's walls were built from river and crushed stones, with a total of two construction stages. The façade is formed by perfectly processed granite blocks aligned in 10 rows. Once, there had been a pediment, the existence of which is proven by a semi-palmette-form antefix found during the archaeological excavations.

In the façade itself, through an arch-like cutting of the blocks’ internal sides, the antechamber's arch is formed. The antechamber has a rectangular form with a stone Ionic-styled column in its front center part. Bones from six animals were found during the archaeological excavations on the premise's floor – four horses and two dogs which are believed to have been sacrificed during the funeral ceremony.

Above the entrance to the central chamber, there is an embossed pediment with a palmette-shaped acroter and two antefixes in the ends. On the inside, there used to be two lacunar stone doors, decorated by indented stylized solar disks painted in red.

The funeral chamber has a round shape and a vault-like cover. Its entire surface was covered with white rendering. In its center, below the key stone, there is a fine Doric-style column. The walls are divided into three horizontal beams. The first one is divided into several fields of seven Dorian-style semi-columns.

In the chamber's northern sector there used to be a stone bed. Based only on the architectural features of the premise, and due to the lack of precise dating archeological material it is difficult to make the precise dating. The tomb dates back to the 4th century BC.

== Svetitsa mound ==
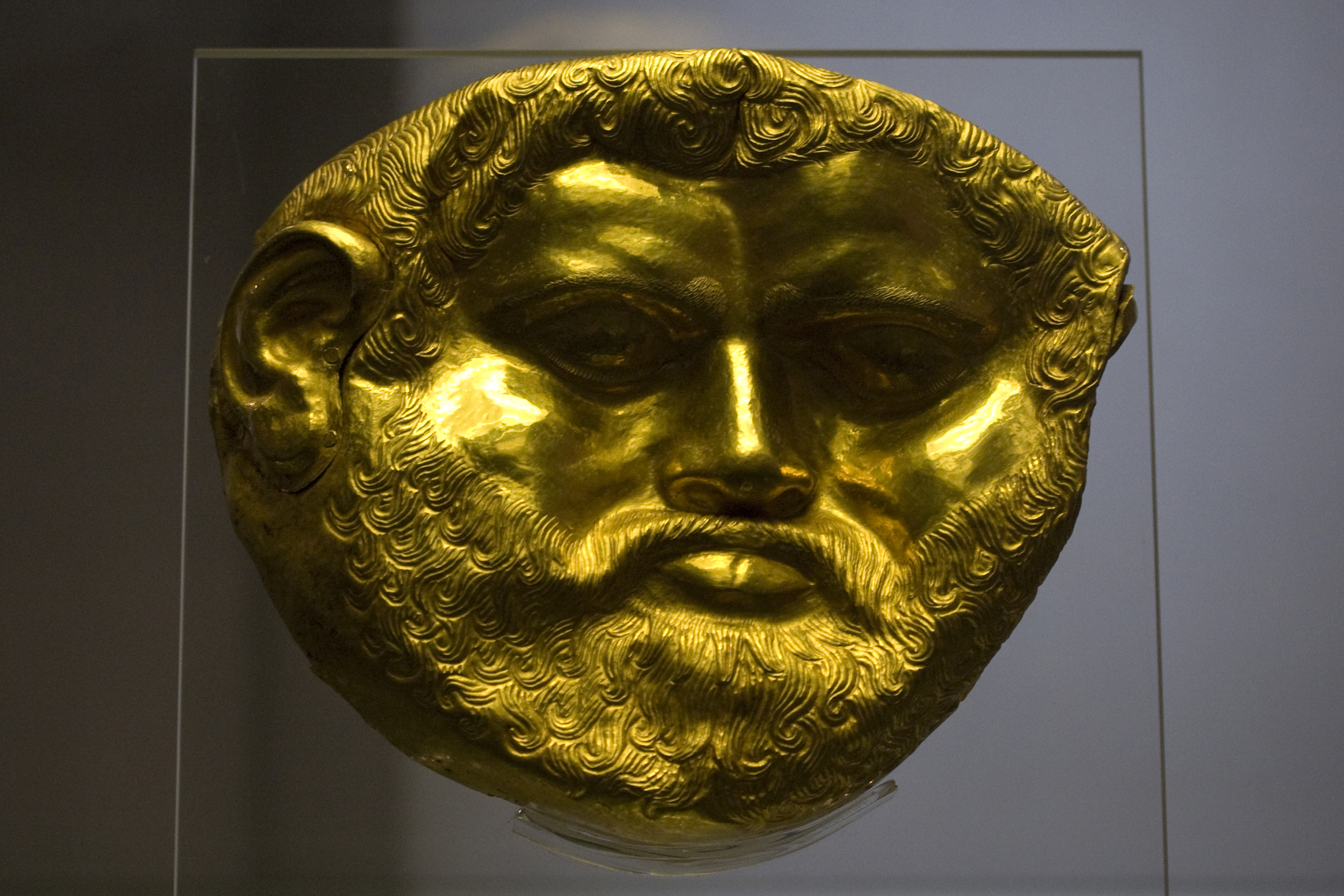
A golden mask of a Thracian ruler found in the tumulus

A masonry grave was discovered in the mound on 19 August 2004, in which a funeral of a representative of the Thracian aristocracy from the second half of the 5th century BC had taken place.

Some of the skeleton bones were found in the tomb in anatomical order, but others were missing, which makes researchers assume that the buried person had been a follower of Orpheus. The body had been laid with complete armaments – bimetal breast-plate, two swords, tips for spears and arrows. As burial gifts one had placed a silver cup, a bronze hydria, two, probably made in Athens, dishes with red figures, two clay amphorae.

Undoubtedly, the most impressive item of the funeral equipment is the gold mask, which was laid on the face of the deceased person. It was made of a solid 673-g gold plate with individual features - thick hair, beard and mustache, the eyes half-closed. This is one of the earliest and richest tombs discovered in the Valley.

== See also ==
- Thracian tomb of Aleksandrovo
- Thracian tomb of Cotys I (Mogilan mound)
- Thracian Tomb of Sveshtari
- Roman Tomb (Silistra)
- Gold wreaths from Thrace
- Thracian treasure

== Sources ==
- Royal Insignia, Tombs and Temples in the Valley of the Thracian rulers - Archaeologia Bulgarica. III. 1, 1-20
- New Discoveries in the Thracian Valley of the Kings in the Region of Kazanluk. Excavations by a Thracian Expedition for Tumular Investigations (TEMP) in the Region of Kazanluk from 1995 till 1997. - TALANTA, XXX-XXXI, 1998–1999, Amsterdam 31-54 (with D. Dimitrova)
- The Thracian Valley of the kings in the Region of Kazanluk - In: Tombes tumularies de I`Age du fer dans le Sud - Est de L~Europe. Ates du II-e Colloque International d`Archeologie Funeraire organize a Tulcea, 119-137
- Долина на тракийските царе. - Българска енциклопедия А-Я, С., 348
- Могила Голяма Арсеналка. - Българска енциклопедия А-Я, С.,733
- Могила на Грифоните - Българска енциклопедия А-Я, С., 733
- Могила Оструша - Българска енциклопедия А-Я, С., 733
- Могила Хелвеция - Българска енциклопедия А-Я, С.,733
- Могила Шушманец - Българска енциклопедия А-Я, С., 733
- Сарафова Могила - Българска енциклопедия А-Я, С., 1011
- Сашова могила - Българска енциклопедия А-Я, С., 1013
- Славчова могила - Българска енциклопедия А-Я, С.,1053
- Долината на тракийските владетели (I). Археология XLIV, 1, 13-28
- The Griffin Tumulus. - Thracia XV, In honorem Annorum Alexandri Fol. 202-312
