= Batak Point =

Point in the South Shetland Islands, Antarctica

Coordinates: 63°02′30.2″S 62°39′26″W

Location of Smith Island in the South Shetland Islands.

Topographic map of Smith Island.

Batak Point (Bulgarian: нос Батак, ‘Nos Batak’ \'nos ba-'tak\) is a point on the northwest coast of Smith Island, South Shetland Islands situated 7 km north-northeast of Cape James, 2.5 km south-southwest of Lista Point and 1.7 km northwest of Organa Peak. Bulgarian early mapping in 2009. Named after the town of Batak in southern Bulgaria.

== Maps ==
- Chart of South Shetland including Coronation Island, &c. from the exploration of the sloop Dove in the years 1821 and 1822 by George Powell Commander of the same. Scale ca. 1:200000. London: Laurie, 1822.
- L.L. Ivanov. Antarctica: Livingston Island and Greenwich, Robert, Snow and Smith Islands. Scale 1:120000 topographic map. Troyan: Manfred Wörner Foundation, 2010. ISBN 978-954-92032-9-5 (First edition 2009. ISBN 978-954-92032-6-4)
- South Shetland Islands: Smith and Low Islands. Scale 1:150000 topographic map No. 13677. British Antarctic Survey, 2009.
- Antarctic Digital Database (ADD). Scale 1:250000 topographic map of Antarctica. Scientific Committee on Antarctic Research (SCAR). Since 1993, regularly upgraded and updated.
- L.L. Ivanov. Antarctica: Livingston Island and Smith Island. Scale 1:100000 topographic map. Manfred Wörner Foundation, 2017. ISBN 978-619-90008-3-0
