= Thracian Tomb of Kazanlak =

UNESCO World Heritage Site
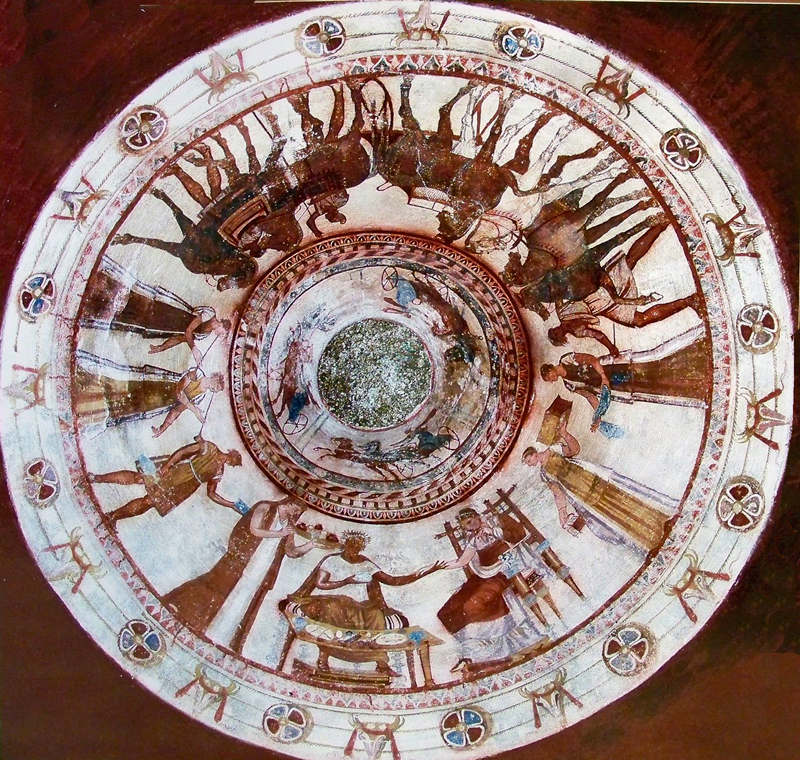
- fresco painting inside the dome of the tomb

- Location within Bulgaria
- Location: Kazanlak, Stara Zagora Province, Bulgaria
- Criteria: Cultural: (i), (iii), (iv)
- Reference: 44
- Inscription: 1979 (3rd Session)
- Area: 0.0155 ha (1,670 sq ft)
- Buffer zone: 7.09 ha (763,000 sq ft)
- Coordinates: 42°37′33″N 25°23′57″E

The Thracian Tomb of Kazanlak (Bulgarian: Казанлъшка гробница, Kazanlǎška grobnica) is a vaulted-brickwork "beehive" (tholos) tomb that is located near the town of Kazanlak in central Bulgaria. The tomb is part of a large royal Thracian necropolis in the Valley of the Thracian Rulers near their ancient capital of Seuthopolis in a region where more than a thousand tombs of royalty and members of the Thracian aristocracy can be found. It lies in the Kazanlak Valley, enclosed between the Balkan Mountains to the north and the Sredna Gora mountain range to the south.

The monument dates back to the fourth century BC and has been on the UNESCO protected World Heritage Site list since 1979. The paintings in this small tomb are Bulgaria's best-preserved artistic masterpieces from the Hellenistic period.

== Description ==
The site consists of a narrow corridor leading to a round, domed chamber of the size required for the burial. Both are painted and decorated with murals representing a Thracian couple at a ritual funeral feast. The murals were created in fresco. The walls were painted with a sanguine or dark reddish color.

The dome mural in this tomb shows a seated couple grasping each other's wrists as others approach in a procession with trays and various items as well as attendees. The couple is seated separately on differing ornate chairs. Bulgarian art historian Lyudmila Zhivkova interprets the shared gesture between the central figures as indicative of a moment of tenderness and equality, but that interpretation is not shared by all specialists. Horn musicians are shown playing their instruments as they walk in the procession. The mural shows horses in several situations: saddled horses are being led or held without riders, an attendant holds the team of horses drawing an awaiting chariot, and a chariot race in progress is depicted at the top of the dome. The main border at the foundation of this dome ceiling mural features cattle skulls that are draped with scarfs of material across their horns that alternates with images of an equilateral-cross design interpreted as a flower. Among other borders that are dividing the dome mural, one band of ornamentation contains an egg-and-dart pattern of Hellenistic style while others display stripes, dentation, and imagery that may have had specific cultural or familial significance.

To preserve the delicate paintings, the tomb is not open to the public, however, a full-size and exact replica was built nearby for public access.

== In contemporary culture ==
The seated woman of the tomb mural is depicted on the reverse of the Bulgarian 50 stotinki coin that was issued in 2005.

== Gallery ==
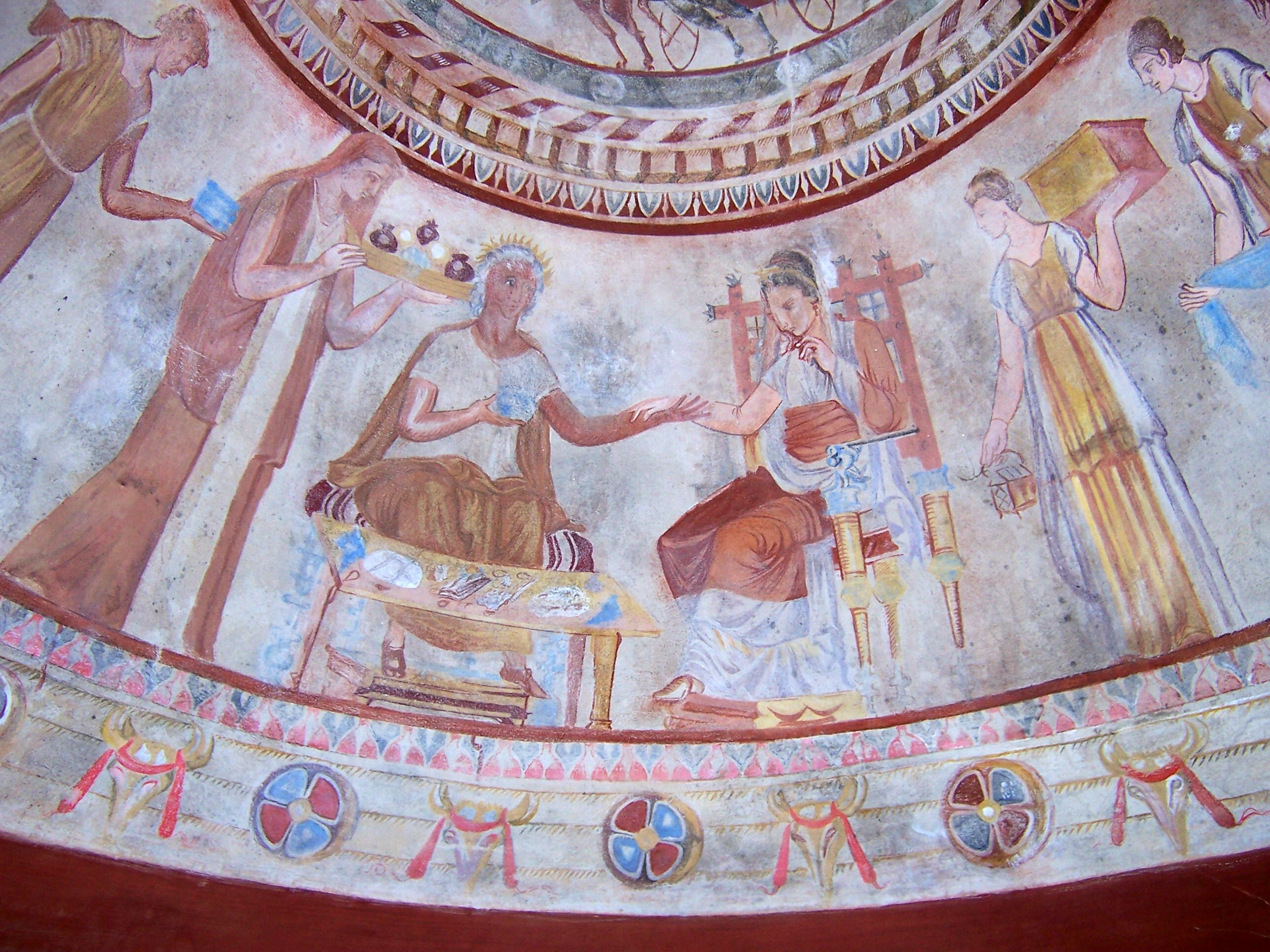
Mural of the Thracian couple with border detail

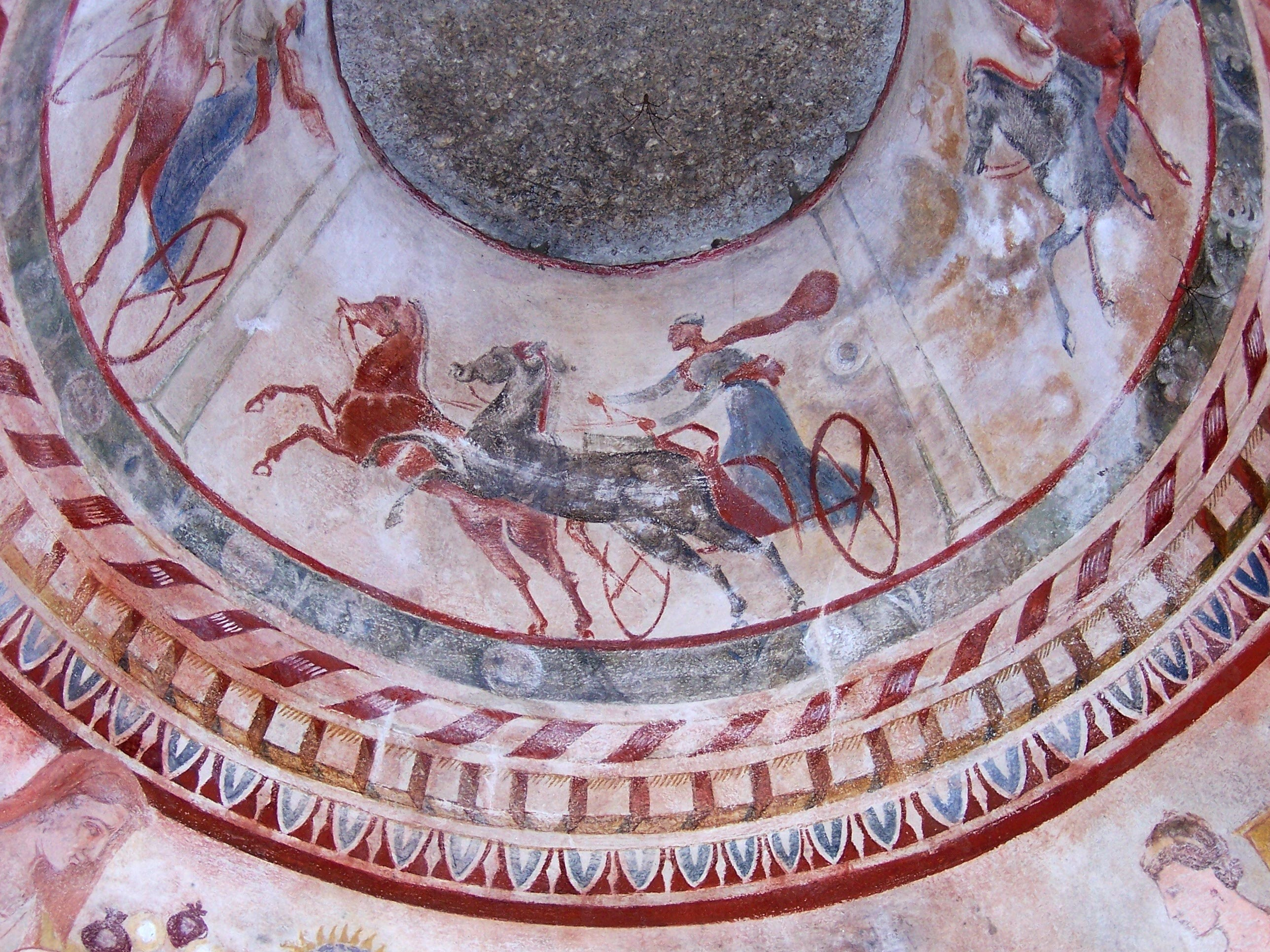
Mural of the Chariot race with border detail

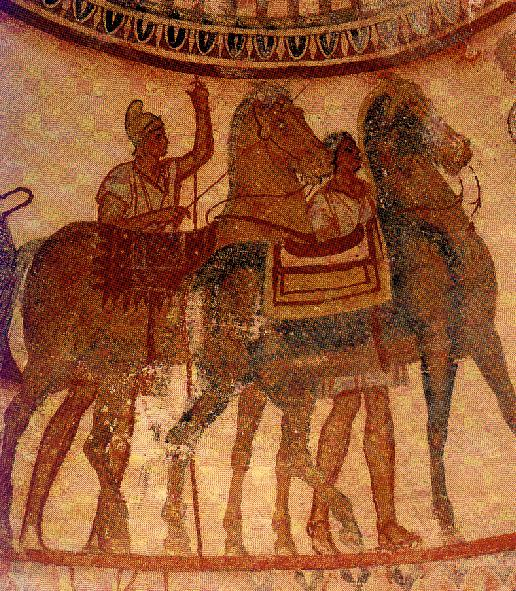
Mural of riderless saddled horses

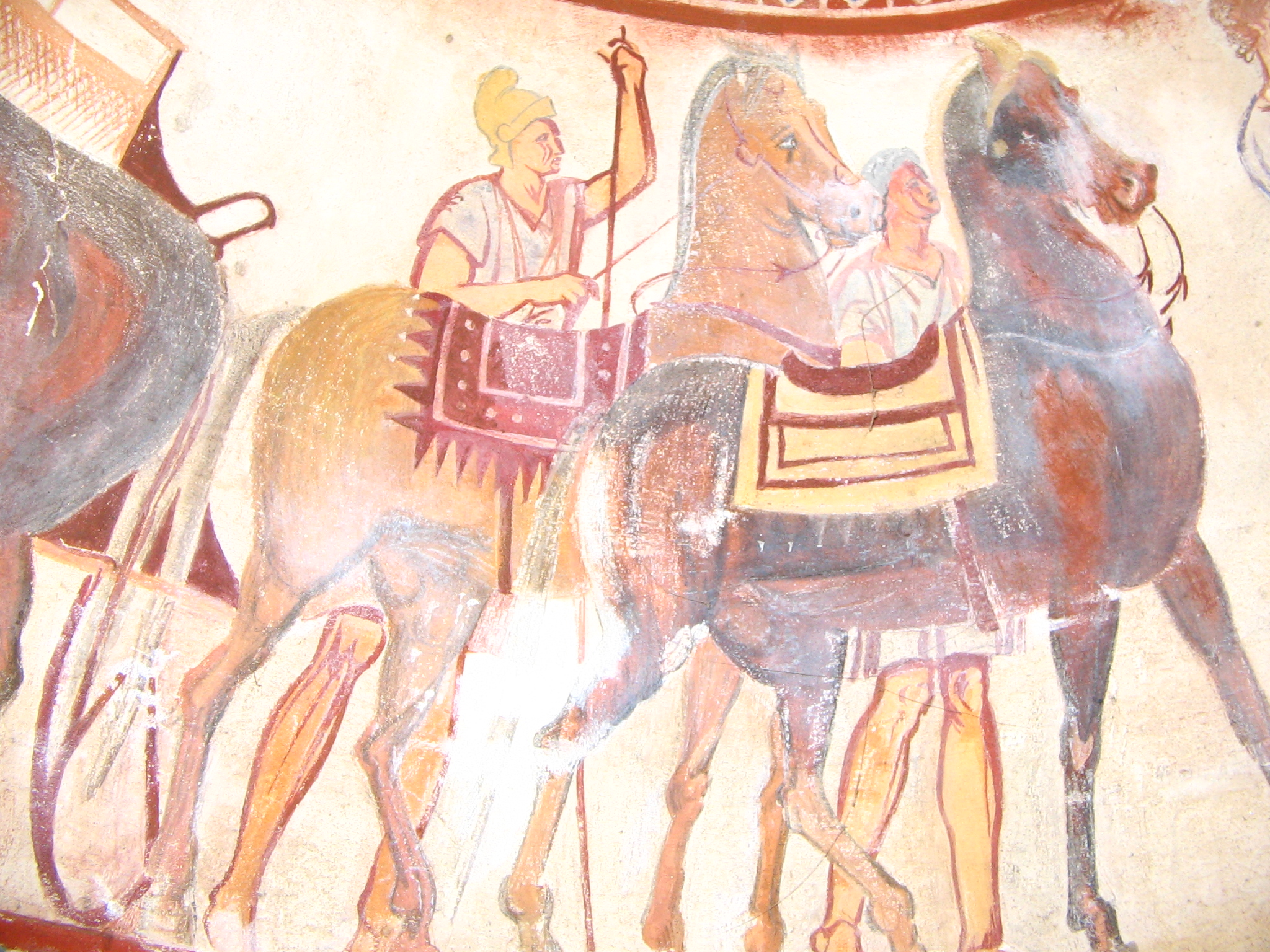
Mural of riderless saddled horses in detail

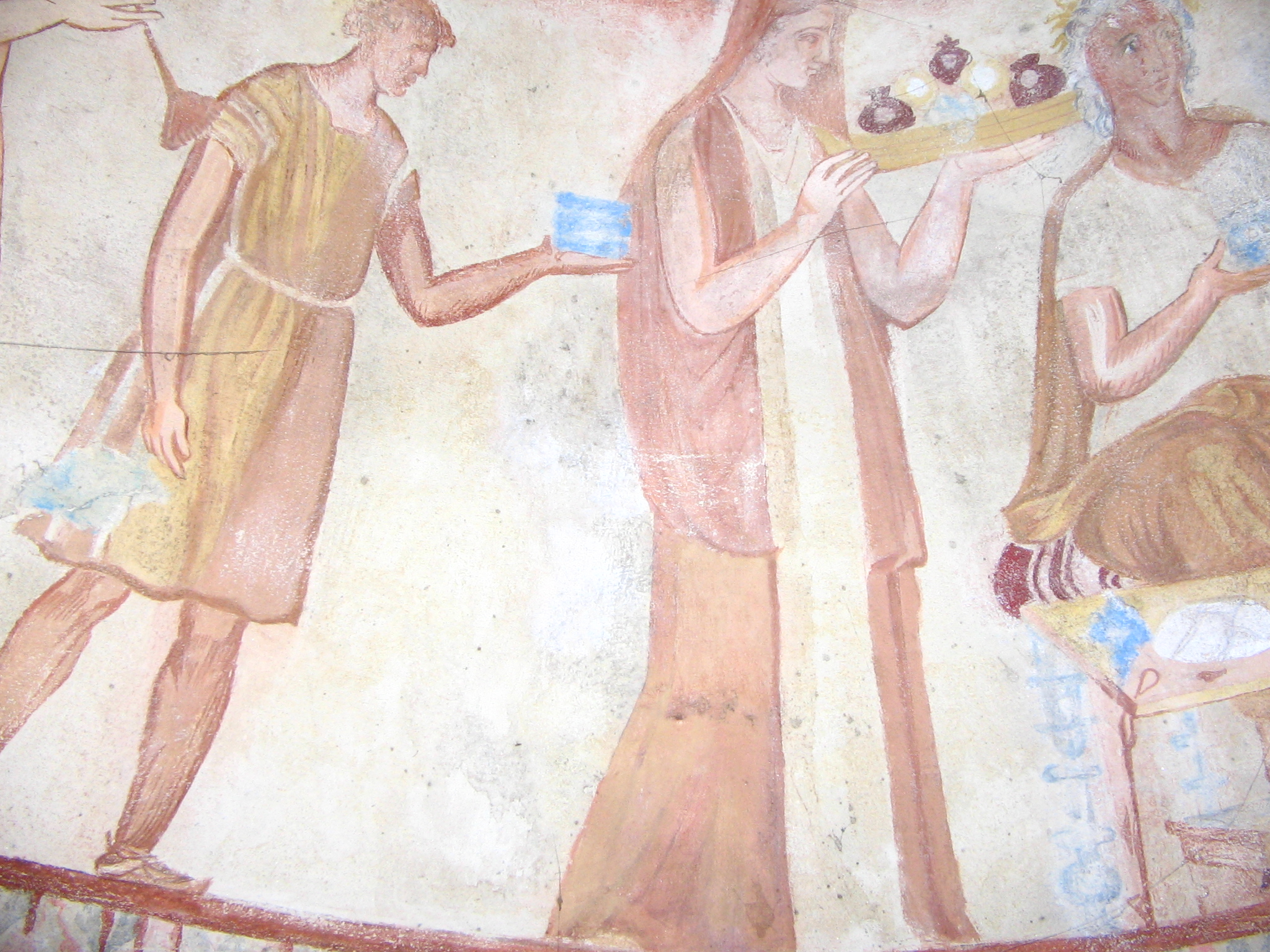
Mural of attendees bearing artifacts

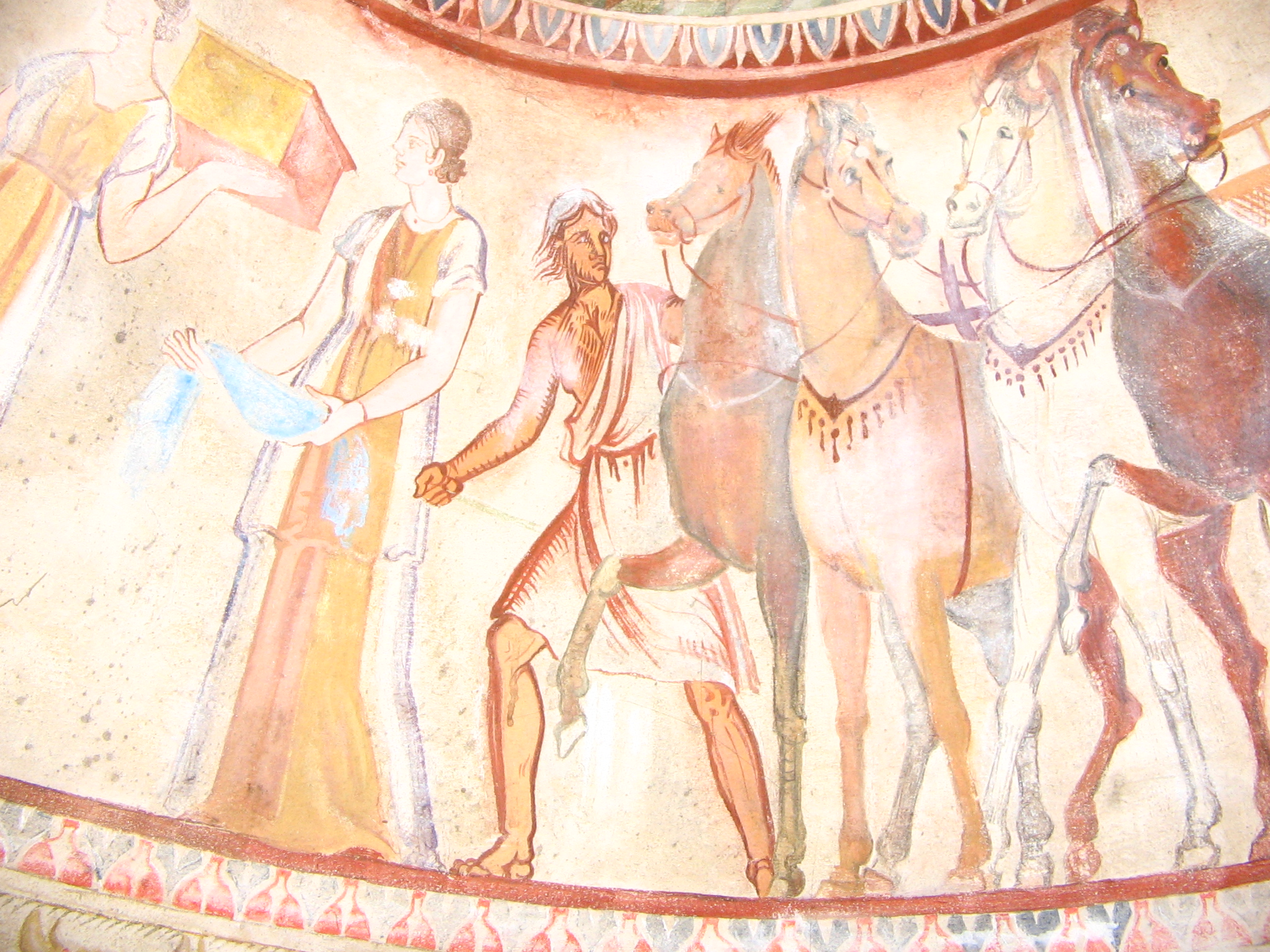
Mural of attendees bearing artifacts and holding an awaiting chariot

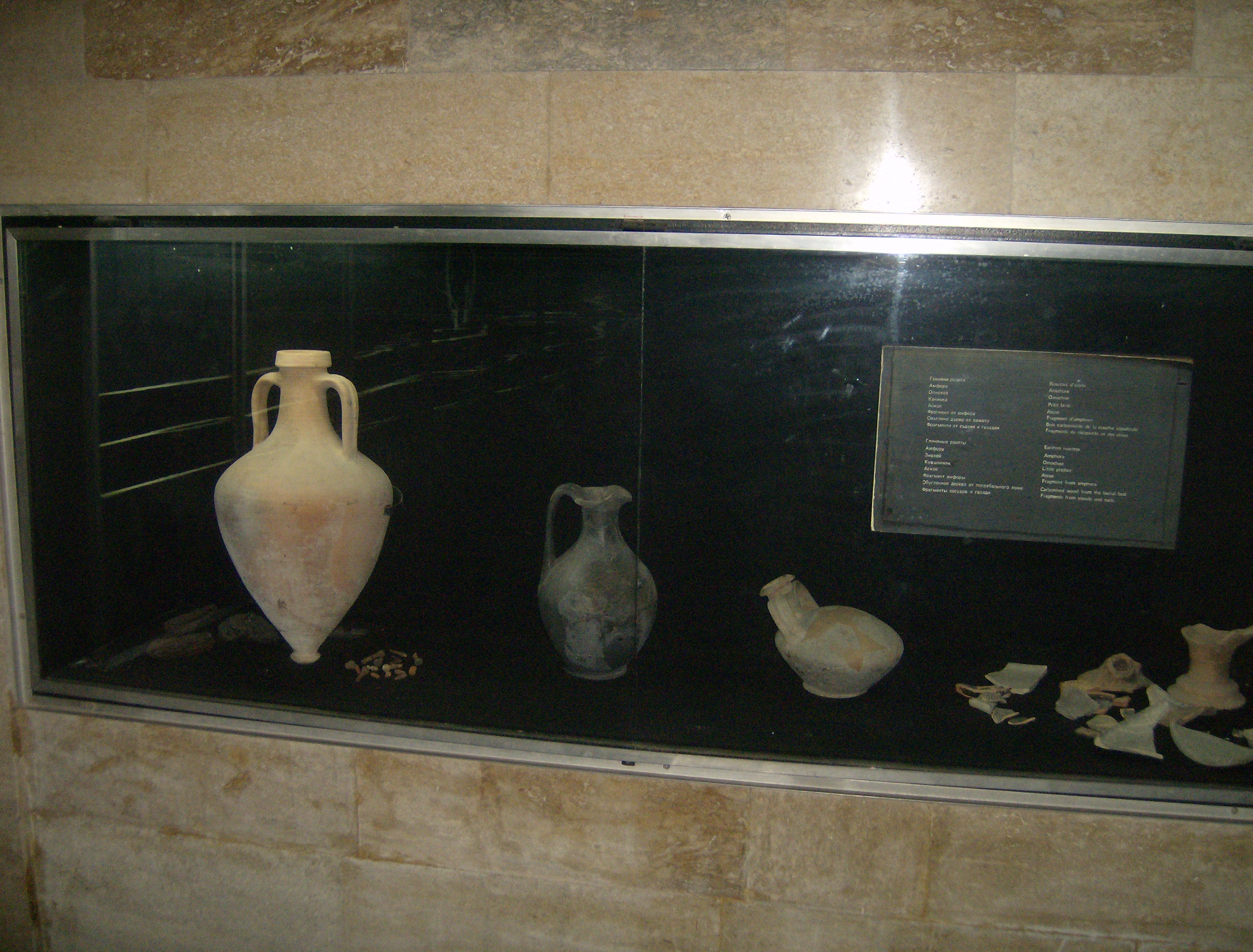
Artifacts from the tomb

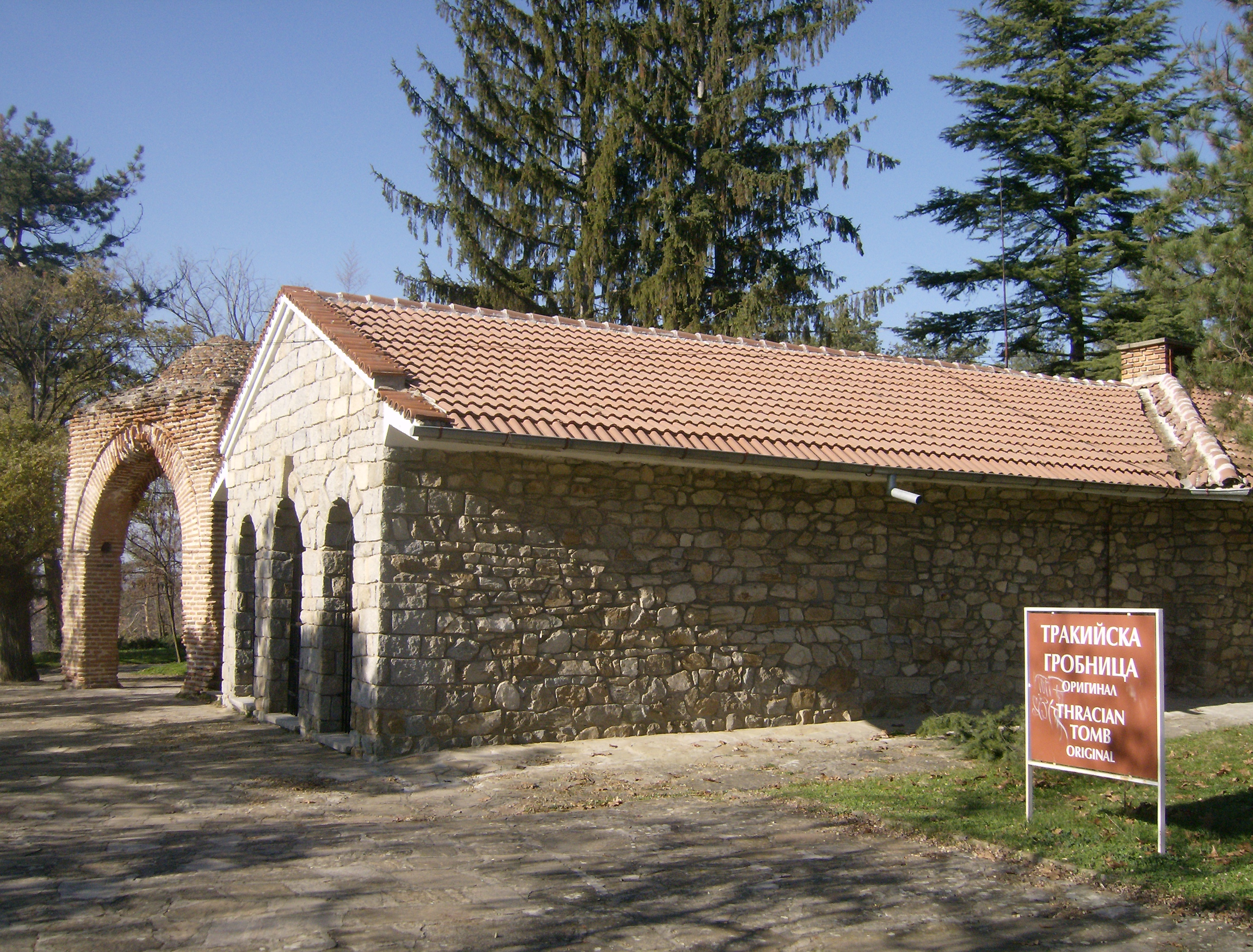
Protective structure built over tomb and sign

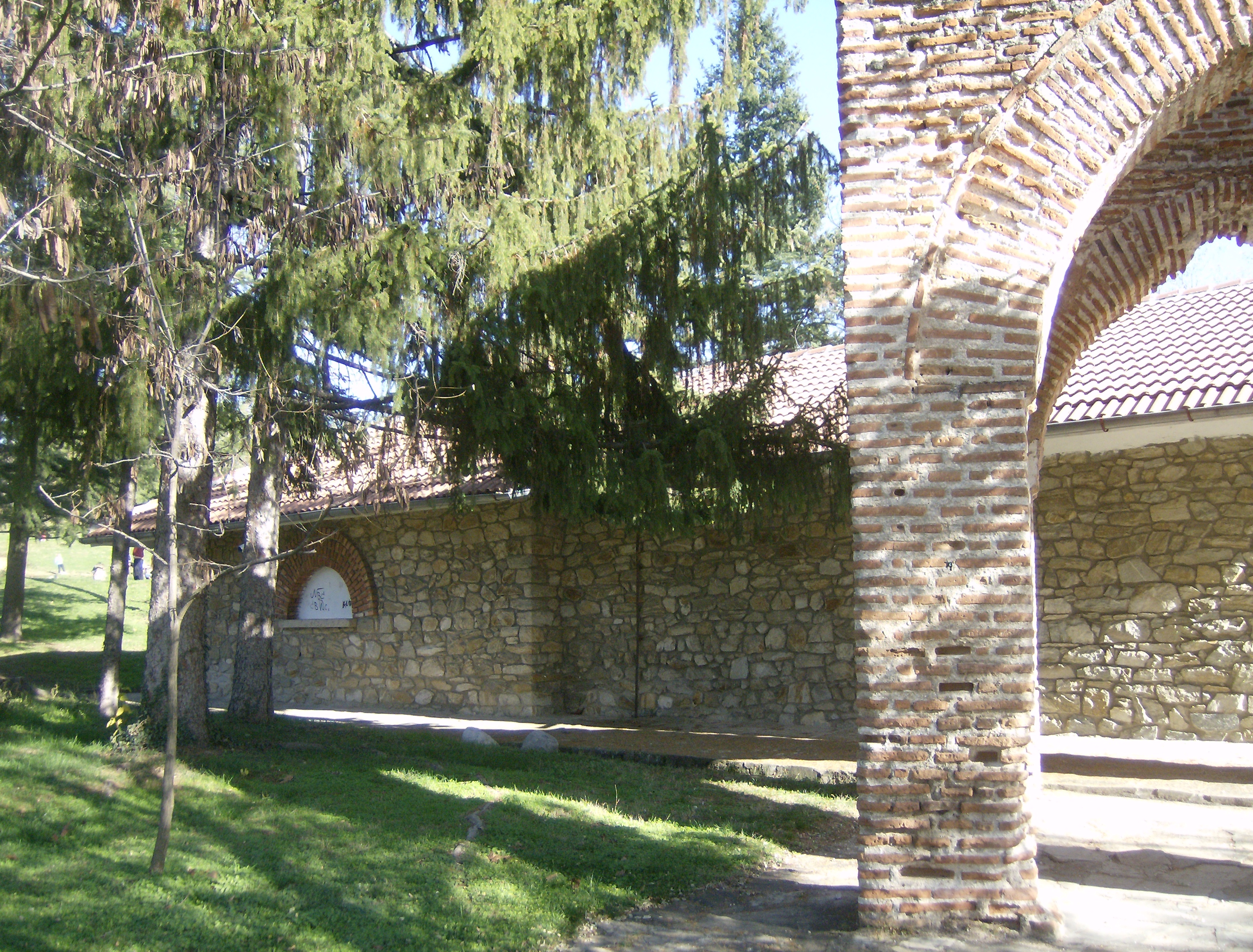
View of protective buildings

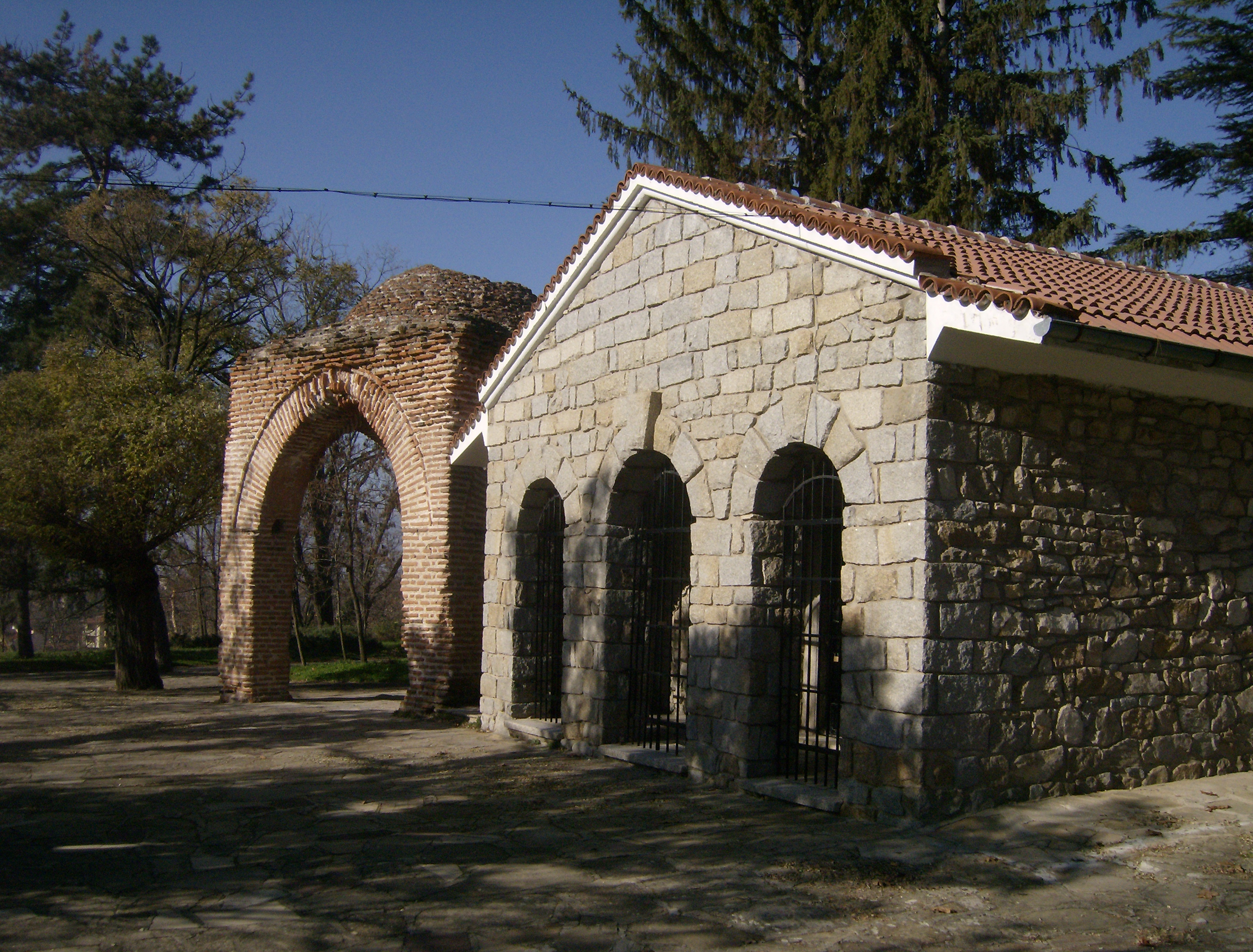
View of protective buildings

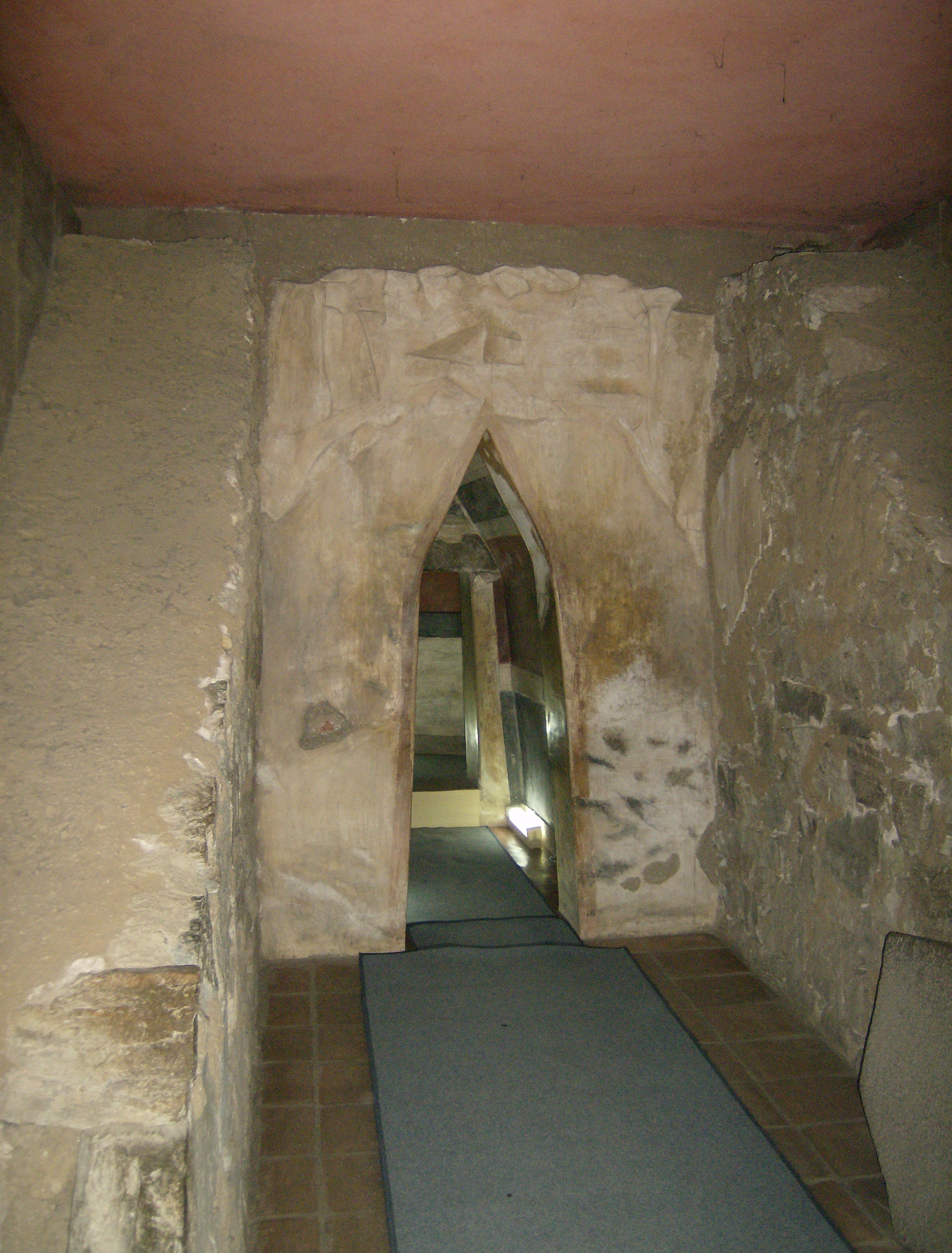
Entrance to replica tomb

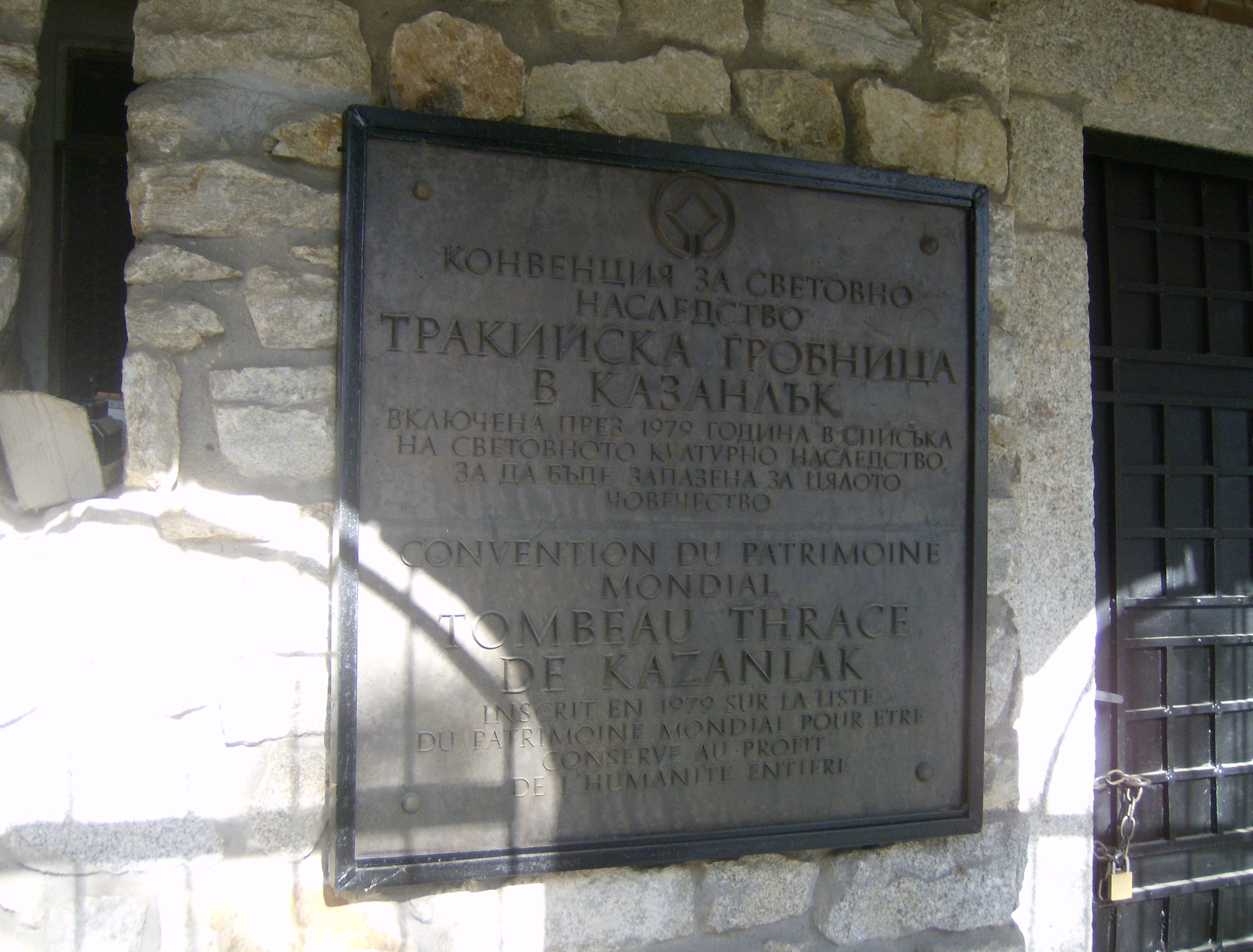
Interpretive sign

== See also ==
- Thracian tomb of Aleksandrovo
- Thracian tomb of Cotys I (Mogilan mound)
- Thracian tomb Golyama Arsenalka
- Thracian tomb Griffins
- Thracian tomb Helvetia
- Thracian tomb Ostrusha
- Thracian tomb of Seuthes III
- Thracian tomb Shushmanets
- Thracian Tomb of Sveshtari
- Valley of the Thracian Rulers
- Roman Tomb (Silistra)
- Gold wreaths from Thrace
- Thracian treasure
