= Maglizh =

Coordinates: 42°36′N 25°33′E

Maglizh Мъглиж (Bulgarian)
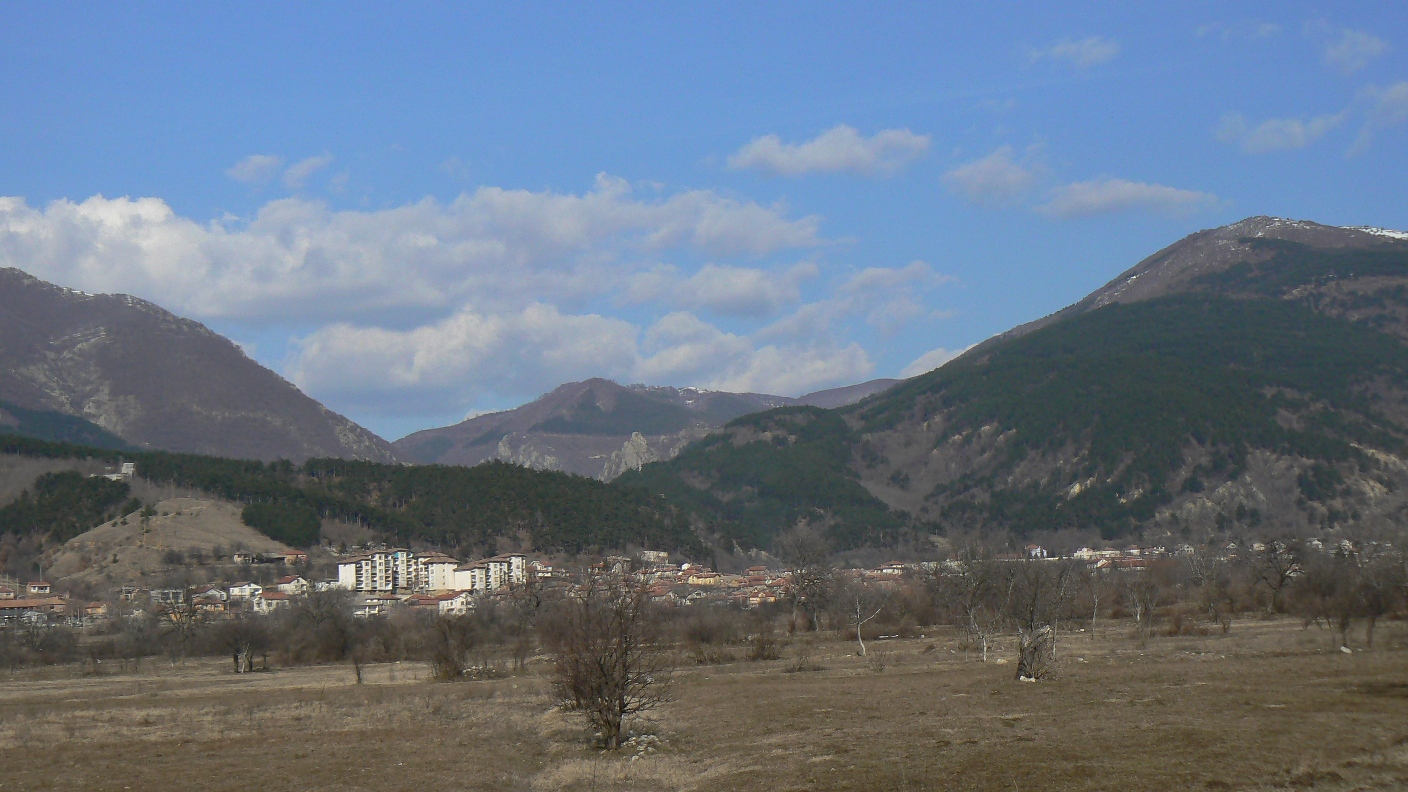

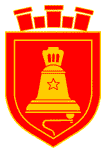
- Coat of arms

- Location within Bulgaria
- Elevation: 375 m (1,230 ft)
- Time zone: UTC+2 (EET)
  - Summer (DST): UTC+3 (EEST)
- Postal code: 6180
- Area code: (+359) 4321
- Website: www.maglizh.bg

Maglizh (Bulgarian: Мъглиж [mɐɡˈliʃ]) is a town in Stara Zagora Province, south-central Bulgaria. It is the administrative centre of the homonymous Maglizh Municipality. As of December 2009, the town had a population of 3,426.

== Geography ==
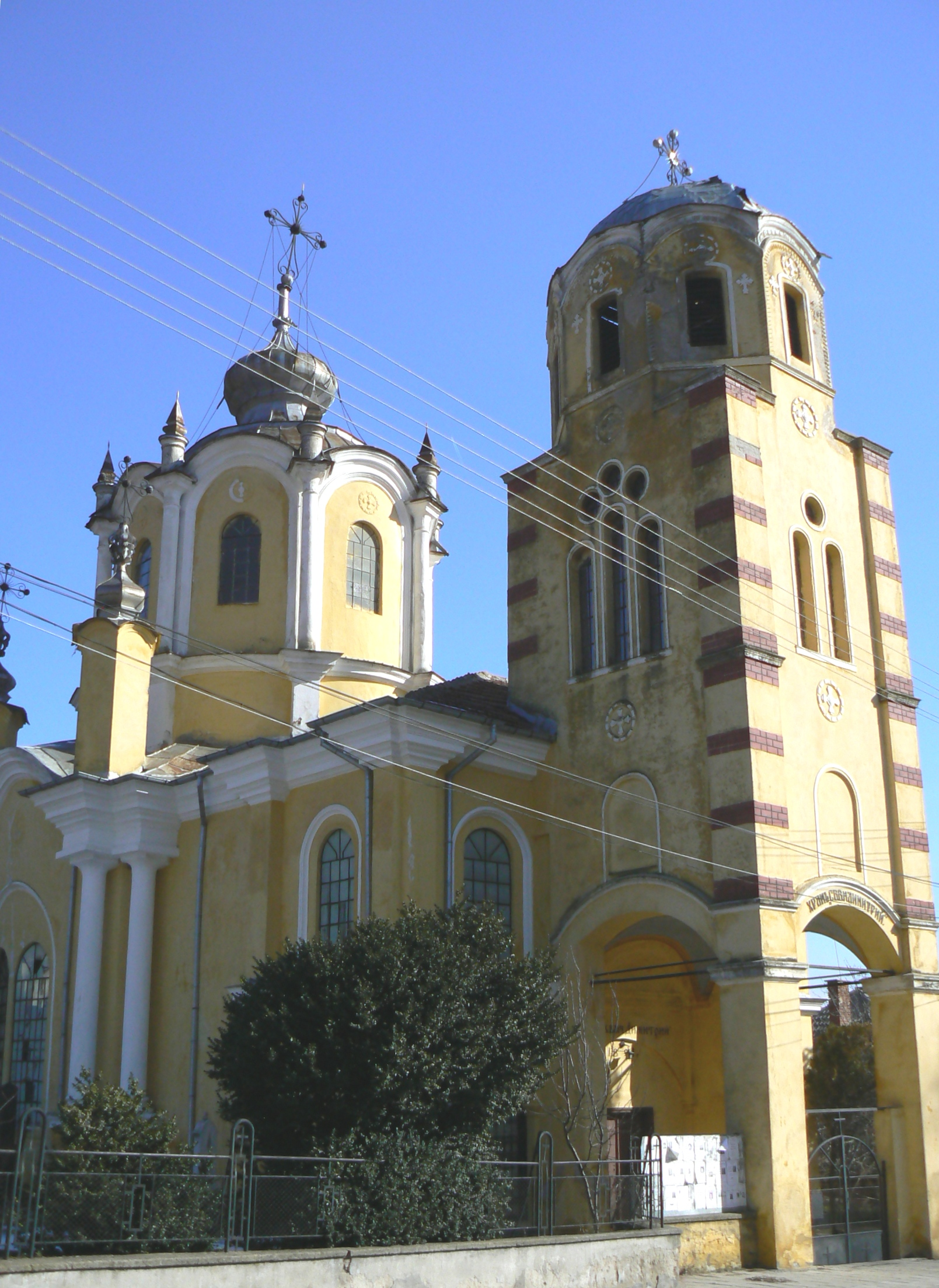
Church Saint Dimitar

Maglizh is located in the Kazanlak Valley at the foothills of the Balkan Mountains.

== Religion ==
The population is composed mostly of Christians. There are two churches in the town and a monastery outside it:

- Orthodox Church of St Demetrius in the upper quarter of the city. The construction of the church was begun by master Kolyu Ficheto (Nikola Fichev), but shortly afterwards he fell ill and the construction was continued by one of his best students - Gencho Novakov. The alst is also the author of the iconostasis. The church is unique in terms of architecture and was declared a monument of culture. The foundation stone of the temple was laid in the 1880s, and the consecration took place in 1891 on St. Demetrius' Day.
- Orthodox Church of the Assumption of the Virgin Mary.
- Monastery of St Nicholas . The Saint Nicholas Maglizh Monastery (Saint Nicholas of the Fog Monastery) is located a mile north of the city Maglizh on the slopes of the Central Balkans, 13 km east of the city Kazanlak and 33 km from the city of Stara Zagora. The monastery complex includes a church, living quarters, stables, and two chapels – The Saints Peter and Paul Chapel and The Archangel Michael Chapel. The monastery is recognized by all three of these names: The Saint Nicholas Monastery, The Saints Peter and Paul Monastery, and The Archangel Michael Monastery. The oldest object at the monastery is a censer on which there is a Greek inscription dated 1233, which was during the reign of the Bulgarian emperor Ivan Asen II (r. 1218–1241), so the history of the monastery has some connection with the Second Bulgarian Empire (1185-1393). After the invasion of the Ottoman Turks during the 14th century, the monastery was often plundered and burned, and then rebuilt. In 1834, the current church at the monastery was erected, which is a single-nave, single-apse construction without a cupola. A point of interest in the church is that some of the Bulgarian saints depicted by the masters on the church's icons are wearing traditional Bulgarian clothing. During the Russo-Turkish war (1877-1888), the Ottomans again set fire to the monastery, but the local residents were able to rebuild it in just a year and a half. The monastery maintained a school for rug weaving, and it also provided shelter for revolutionaries who fought to liberate the country from the Ottomans. Vasil Levski (1837-1873), known as an apostle of the Bulgarian revolution, stayed at the monastery on several occasions. In 1922, the monastery was converted into a convent, and there are still a few nuns living on the premises.

== Main sights ==
=== Museums ===
- Maglizh has one of the richest collections of ores and minerals in Bulgaria. It was donated to the city by Academician Yovcho Smilov Yovchev, originally from Maglizh. The collection is on display in the community center.
- Exhibition of paintings by artists from Maglizh, and paintings on silk by the young artists of the city can be seen in the children's center - in the building of the cinema 3rd floor.

=== Nature ===
- "Skokovete" - thus are called the two waterfalls that are located on the "Selchenska" River, descending through a picturesque gorge above the town of Maglizh. The falls were declared a natural wonder in 1965. The "Golemia Skok"(The Big Drop) waterfall is located about 40 minutes away along fearsome cliffs, shady glades and pools, and after crossing the river several times. Its height is 15 m. The "Malkia Skok"(The Little Drop) is a fall before the big fall and is a small pool formed by a drop.
- Vinishki Rock Nature Reserve, where an icon dedicated to The Holy Trinity has been carved into the cliff. It is a rock formation above the Maglizhki monastery, to the north. A large cross was erected on top of the rock, visible from afar. Suitable for rock climbing.

=== Other ===
- Maglishka tomb - belongs to the architectural style of the domed tombs. It is a cultural monument of national importance. In the summer of 1965, about 3 km west of Maglizh, in connection with the construction of an industrial facility, was conducted an excavation of Thracian burial mound with a height of 13 m, and a diameter of 48 m. It is part of a large necropolis, located over a large area to the southern slopes of the mountain, and one of the many tombs in The Valley of the Thracian Rulers.
- Memorial monument to those who died in battle. The monument is located in the central square of the city. It represents an inclined structure coated with dark gray marble and dark green granite. It consists of four parts - three are marble and thereon are inscribed the names of the 166 residents from the city who have died during World War I, the Balkan Wars, and World War II. The 4th part - granite, has an embossed honorary sign and the inscriptions "Bulgaria, they died for you ..." and "From the grateful descendants of the town of Maglizh."

== Events ==
Every year on Palm Sunday the citizens of Maglizh celebrate their town's holiday. Citywide celebrations with diverse cultural and musical program are organized.

== Honour ==
Maglizh Rocks off Smith Island, South Shetland Islands are named after Maglizh.

== Literature ==
- Vapirev, N., Collection of articles and materials on the history of the city of Maglizh, Samizdat, 2008, page 130 (in Bulgarian)
- Vapirev, N., Collection of articles and materials on the history of the city of Maglizh, Samizdat, 2011, page 242 (in Bulgarian)
- Joint scientific study, Maglizh and the people of Maglizh in the 20th century. SU „Sv. Kliment Ohridski”, 2013, page 312, ISBN 9789540736099 (in Bulgarian)
