= Maglizh Rocks =

Group of rocks in Antarctica

- Location of Smith Island in the South Shetland Islands

- Location within Antarctica Location within Antarctic Peninsula

Geography
- Location: Antarctica
- Coordinates: 63°01′06″S 62°38′11″W
- Archipelago: South Shetland Islands
- Area: 10.6 ha (26 acres)

Administration
- Administered under the Antarctic Treaty System

Demographics
- Population: Uninhabited

Topographic map of Smith Island.

Maglizh Rocks (Bulgarian: Мъглижки скали, ‘Maglizhki Skali’ m&-'glizh-ki ska-'li) are a group of rocks off the northwest coast of Smith Island, South Shetland Islands. The two adjacent principal rocks, extending 460 m (503 yd) in east-west direction and 140 m (153 yd) wide are situated 300 m (328 yd) north of Lista Point, with the third major one, 300 by 100 m, situated 320 m (350 yd) northwest of them. The rocks have a combined surface area of 10.6 hectares (26 acres). The rocks are named after the town of Maglizh in southern Bulgaria.

== Maps ==
- Chart of South Shetland including Coronation Island, &c. from the exploration of the sloop Dove in the years 1821 and 1822 by George Powell Commander of the same. Scale ca. 1:200000. London: Laurie, 1822.
- L.L. Ivanov. Antarctica: Livingston Island and Greenwich, Robert, Snow and Smith Islands. Scale 1:120000 topographic map. Troyan: Manfred Wörner Foundation, 2010. ISBN 978-954-92032-9-5 (First edition 2009. ISBN 978-954-92032-6-4)
- South Shetland Islands: Smith and Low Islands. Scale 1:150000 topographic map No. 13677. British Antarctic Survey, 2009.
- Antarctic Digital Database (ADD). Scale 1:250000 topographic map of Antarctica. Scientific Committee on Antarctic Research (SCAR). Since 1993, regularly upgraded and updated.
- L.L. Ivanov. Antarctica: Livingston Island and Smith Island. Scale 1:100000 topographic map. Manfred Wörner Foundation, 2017. ISBN 978-619-90008-3-0

== See also ==
- Composite Antarctic Gazetteer
- List of Antarctic islands south of 60° S
- SCAR
- Territorial claims in Antarctica
