= Koprinka Reservoir =

Koprinka Dam
- Язовир Копринка (Bulgarian)
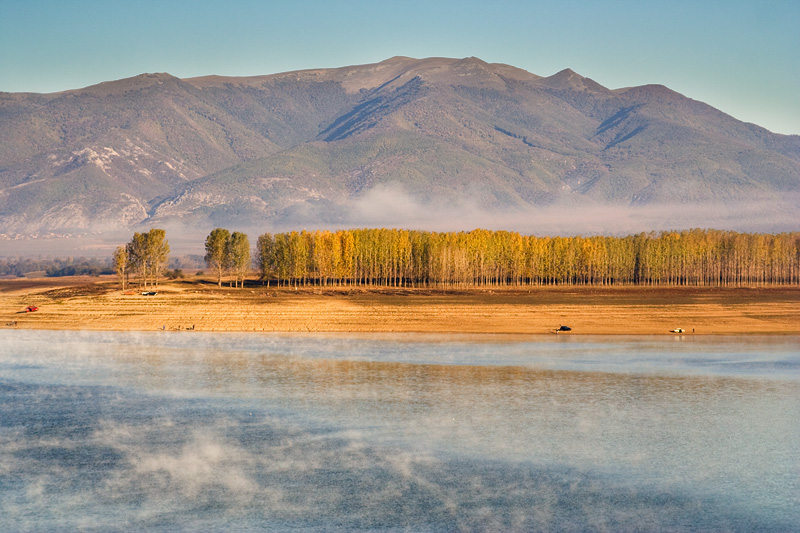
- A view of Koprinka

- Location within Bulgaria
- Location: Stara Zagora Province
- Coordinates: 42°37′N 25°19′E
- Type: reservoir
- Basin countries: Bulgaria
- Max. length: 7.4 km (4.6 mi)
- Max. width: 1.2 km (0.75 mi)
- Surface area: 11.2 km^{2} (4.3 sq mi)
- Water volume: 140×10^{6} m^{3} (110,000 acre⋅ft)
- Surface elevation: 390 m (1,280 ft)

Koprinka (Bulgarian: Копринка) is a reservoir and dam in the Rose Valley, central Bulgaria.

Its construction began after 1944 and was finished in 1956. It was built on the Tundzha river at 7 km to the west of the city of Kazanlak near the village of Koprinka. It is situated at 300 m to the south of the main sub-Balkan road between the capital Sofia and Burgas. The reservoir is around 7 km in length and covers an area of 11.2 km². The depth varies between 44 and 78 metres. The shores are rugged with many branches and bays.

== Seuthopolis ==
During the construction of the dam was discovered the ancient Thracian city Seuthopolis which was the capital of the Odrysian kingdom. The remains of the city were carefully studied and the artifacts were collected in the Regional Museum of History. In 2005, the Bulgarian architect Zheko Tilev proposed a project to uncover, preserve and reconstruct the city of Seuthopolis which is the best preserved Thracian city in Bulgaria by means of a dam wall surrounding the ruins in the middle of the dam, enabling the site's inscription as a UNESCO World Heritage Site and making it a tourist destination of world importance. Tourists would be transported to the site by boats. The round wall, 420 metres in diameter, would enable visitors to see the city from 20 metres above and would also feature "hanging gardens", glass lifts, a quay, restaurants, cafés, shops, ateliers, etc. It would be illuminated at night.

The project was donated by the architect to Kazanlak municipality and funds are being raised to begin construction. According to Tilev, it would cost minimum €50 million.

== Leisure ==
Many citizens of Kazanlak spend their leisure time around the reservoir which offers good conditions for water sports. It is also a good place for fishing with the abundance of barbel, chub, carp, catfish and other species of freshwater fish. Many birds use Koprinka as a winter place.
