= Seuthopolis =

Ancient city

Coordinates: 42°37′05″N 25°18′20″E

Seuthopolis (Ancient Greek: Σευθόπολις) was an ancient Hellenistic city founded by the Thracian king Seuthes III between 325–315 BC which was the capital of the Odrysian kingdom.

Its ruins are now located at the bottom of the Koprinka Reservoir near Kazanlak, Stara Zagora Province, in central Bulgaria.

Several kilometres north of the city is the Valley of the Thracian Rulers, where many Thracian royal tombs are located.

== Description ==
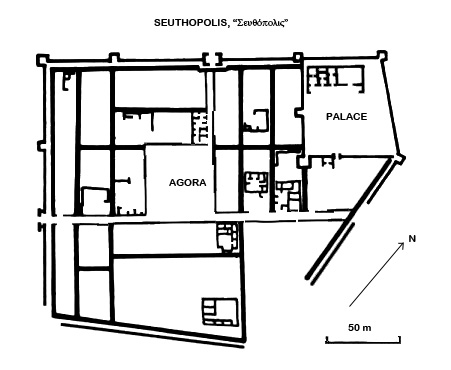
Seuthopolis city plan

Seuthopolis was not a true polis, but rather the seat of Seuthes and his court. His palace had a dual role, functioning also as a sanctuary of the Cabeiri, the gods of Samothrace. Most of the space within the city was occupied not by homes but by official structures, the majority of the people living outside the city. It had Thracian and Greek populace. In 281 BC it was sacked by Celts.

The dual role of Seuthes' palace (royal court and sanctuary) indicates that Seuthes was a priest–king: the high priest of the Cabeiri among the Odrysian Thracians. According to Seuthopolis’ sign, the sanctuary of Dionysius/Sabazios was situated on the square.

The cemetery of Seuthopolis included a number of brick tholos tombs, some covered by tumuli, in which the upper-class were interred, sometimes along with their horses. The less affluent were cremated, with modest grave goods laid alongside.

== Dam flooding ==
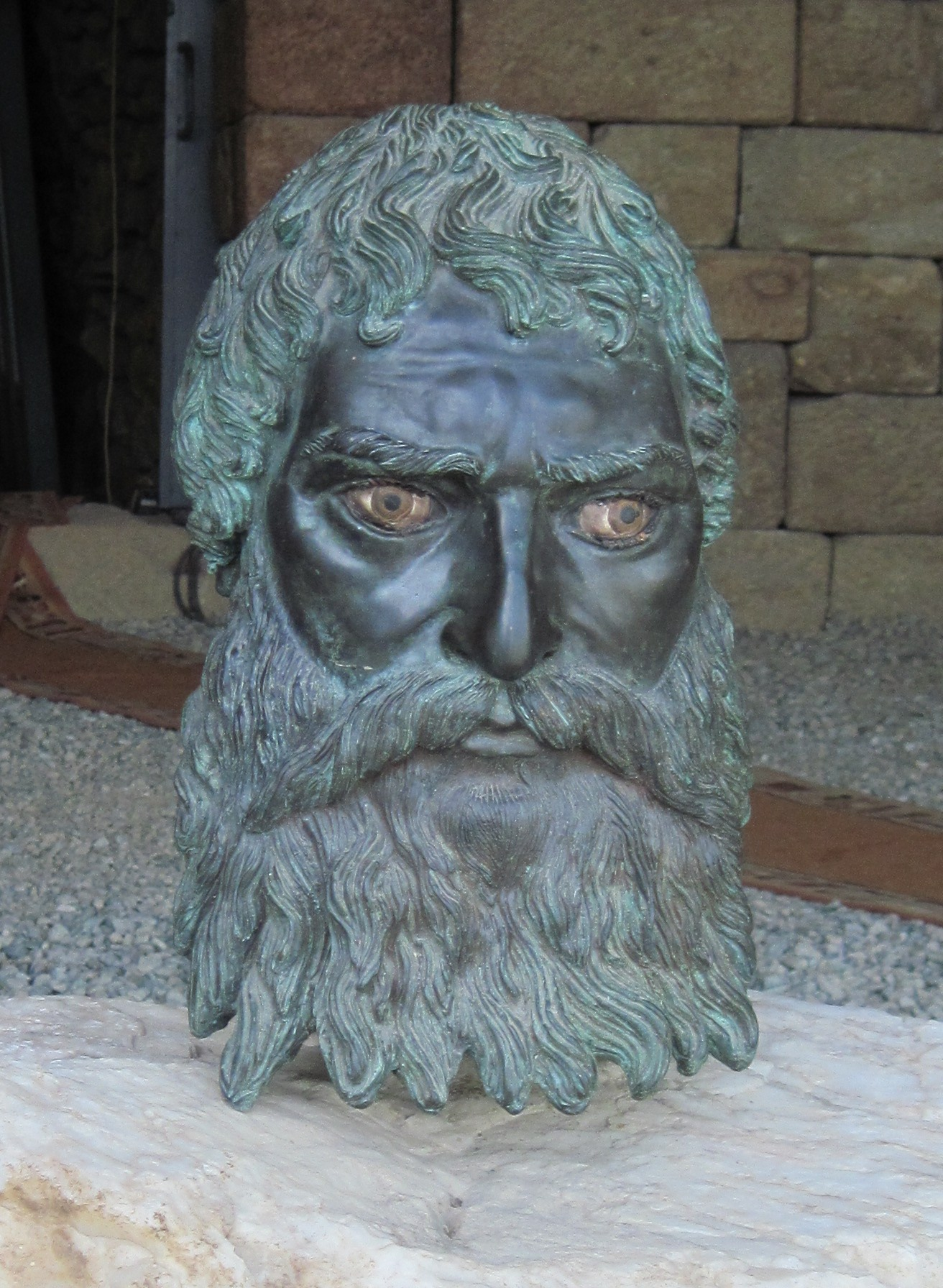
Bronze head of King Seuthes III

The ruins of the city were discovered and excavated in 1948 by Bulgarian archeologists during the construction of the Georgi Dimitrov (later renamed Koprinka) Reservoir. However, it was decided to continue with the construction and flood the dam, leaving Seuthopolis at its bottom. Despite the importance of the discovery, the government gave the archaeologists 6 years to research and preserve as much of the city as they could.

One of the most important archaeological finds is the so-called "Great inscription" found in 1953 in the palace-citadel. It is written in Greek, which indicates that Thracians were already hellenised in the 3rd century BC.

== Dam wall proposal ==
In 2005, Bulgarian architect Zheko Tilev proposed a project to uncover, preserve and reconstruct the city of Seuthopolis (the best-preserved Thracian city in Bulgaria) by means of a dam wall surrounding the ruins in the middle of the dam, enabling the site's inscription as a UNESCO World Heritage Site and making it a tourist destination of world importance. Tourists would be transported to the site by boats. The round wall, 420 metres in diameter, would enable visitors to see the city from 20 metres above and would also feature "hanging gardens", glass lifts, a quay, restaurants, cafés, shops, ateliers, etc. It would be illuminated at night.

The project was donated by the architect to Kazanlak municipality and funds are being raised to begin construction. According to Tilev, it would cost minimum €50 million.

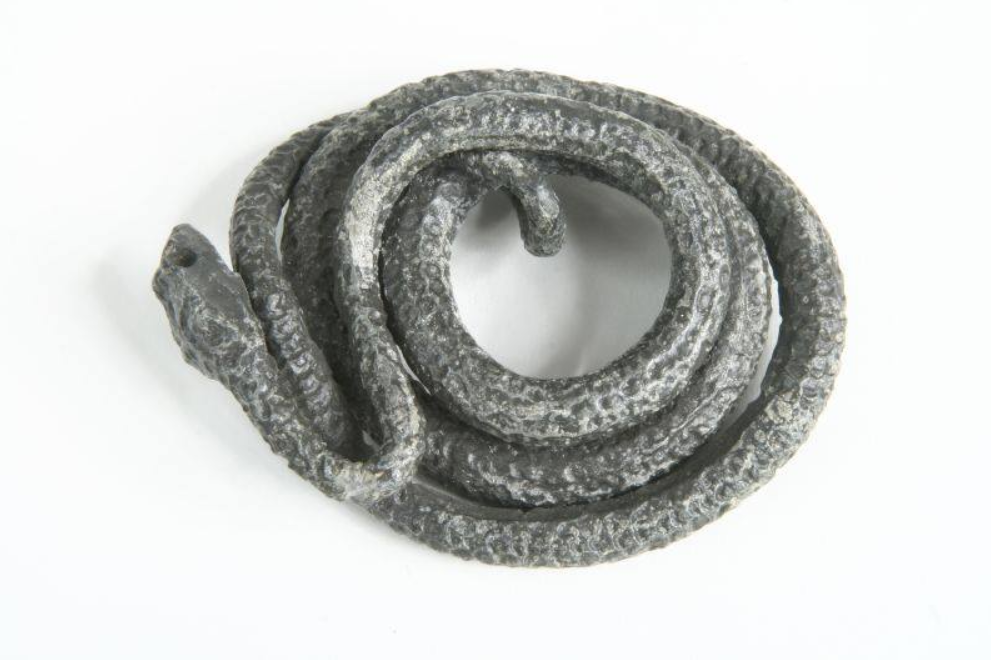
Lead serpent from Seuthopolis, Kazanlak region, Bulgaria.IV-III century BC

== Legacy ==
Sevtopolis Peak on Greenwich Island in the South Shetland Islands, Antarctica is named for Seuthopolis.

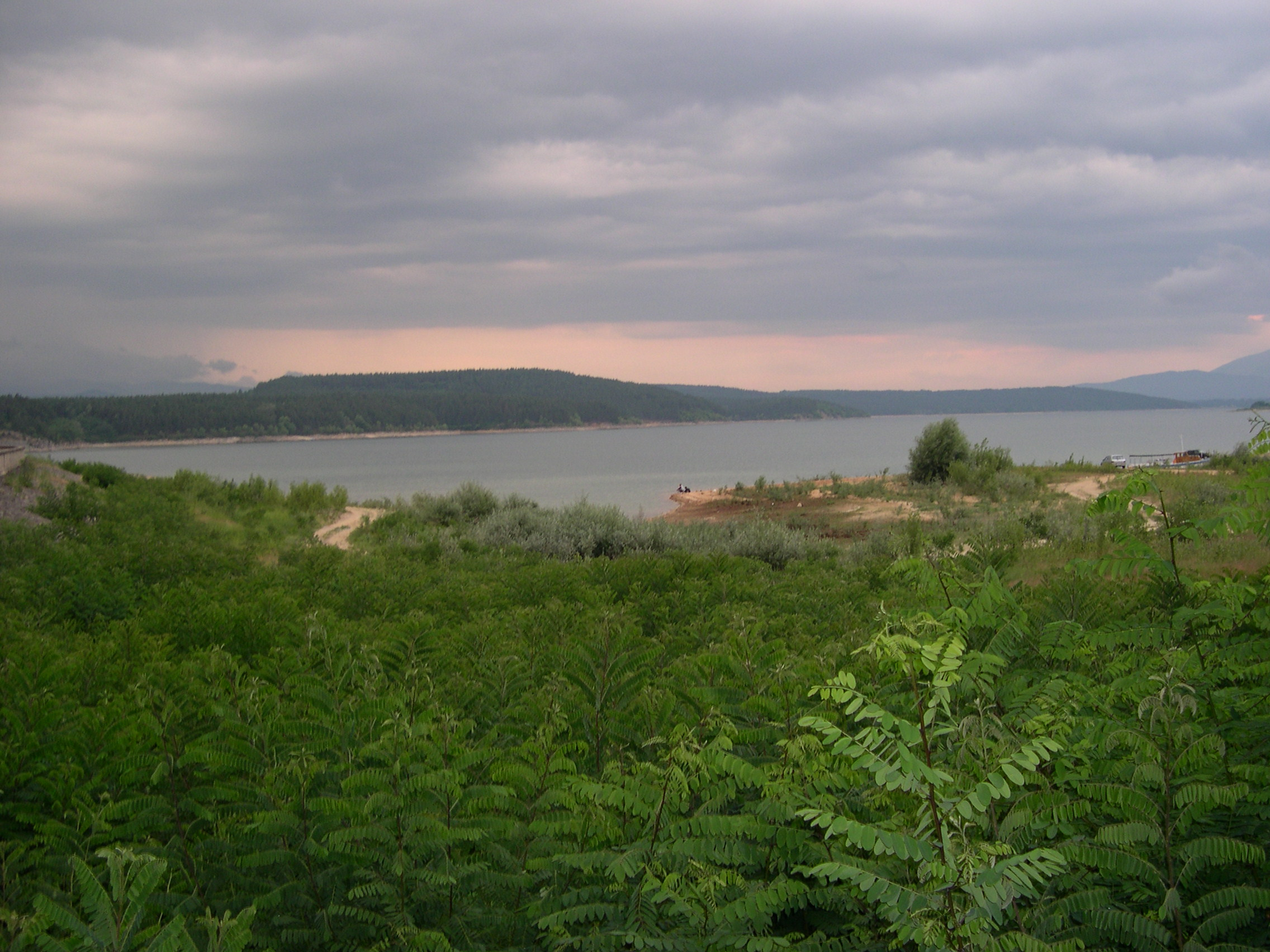
Artificial lake of Kazanlak, the site of the Seuthopolis excavation

== See also ==
- List of ancient Thracian cities
