= List of villages in Stara Zagora Province =

This is a list of villages in Stara Zagora Province, Bulgaria.

- Benkovski
- Bratya Daskalovi
- Bratya Kunchevi
- Byal Izvor
- Darzhava
- Daskal-Atanasovo
- Dimitrievo
- Dolno Selo
- Dolno Novo Selo
- Edrevo
- Elhovo
- Gita
- Gledachevo
- Golyam Dol
- Gorno Botevo
- Granit
- Iskritsa
- Kanchevo
- Kazanka
- Khan Asparuhovo
- Kolyu Marinovo
- Konare
- Kovachevo
- Kozarevets
- Madrets
- Malak Dol
- Malka Vereya
- Malko Dryanovo
- Markovo
- Matsa
- Mirovo
- Musachevo
- Naidenovo
- Nova Mahala
- Novo Selo
- Opalchenets
- Opan
- Orizovo
- Oslarka
- Ostra Mogila
- Panicherevo
- Pastrovo
- Plodovitovo
- Ploska Mogila
- Podslon
- Pomoshtnik
- Pravoslav
- Pryaporets
- Pshenichevo
- Razhevo
- Rumanya
- Saedinenie
- Samuilovo
- Sarnevets
- Sladak Kladenets
- Slavyanin
- Srednogorovo
- Starozagorski bani
- Sulitsa
- Tselina
- Vasil Levski
- Veren
- Viden
- Zlatna Livada

== See also ==
- List of villages in Bulgaria
