= Vesselina Breskovska =

Bulgarian geologist (1928–1997)

- Веселина Василева Бресковска
- Born: 6 December 1928; Granit, Stara Zagora Province, Kingdom of Bulgaria
- Died: 12 August 1997 (aged 68); Sofia, Republic of Bulgaria
- Resting place: Central Sofia Cemetery; 42°43.074′N 23°19.904′E
- Citizenship: Bulgarian
- Education: Leningrad State University; Sofia University "St. Kliment Ohridski"
- Known for: ardaite
- Children: а daughter and a son
- Parent(s): Vassil Stoychev Breskovski (father); Paraskeva (née Nedelcheva Slavova) Breskovska (mother)
- Relatives: Stoycho Vassilev Breskovski (brother)
- Scientific career
- Fields: mineralogy geology X-ray crystallography
- Workplaces: Sofia University "St. Kliment Ohridski"
- Thesis: Минералогия и генезис на Маджаровската и други оловно-цинкови минерализации от Авренско-Маджаровския руден пояс (1988)

Vesselina Vassileva Breskovska (Bulgarian: Веселина Василева Бресковска) (December 6, 1928, Granit, Stara Zagora Province, Bulgaria – August 12, 1997, Sofia, Bulgaria) was a 20th-century Bulgarian geologist, mineralogist and crystallographer.

== Biography ==
Vesselina Breskovska was born in Granit, the only daughter of educators Vassil Stoychev Breskovski and Paraskeva (née Nedelcheva Slavova) Breskovska. Her younger brother was the late paleontologist, Stoycho Vassilev Breskovski. After successfully completing Second Young Women's High School in Plovdiv she was admitted to study in the Soviet Union. In 1952, she took her degree in mineralogy at Leningrad State University. Upon her return to Bulgaria she was appointed assistant professor in mineralogy at Sofia University. Later she became docent and full professor, and taught the main courses in mineralogy, crystallography, X-ray analysis to students of natural sciences. Her favorite lecture course was "Minerals in Bulgaria" and students appreciated it. She taught it for many years, and dedicated a major portion of her research to treating the subject in a systematic manner. In 1988 she was awarded the title Doctor of Science by Sofia University. Breskovska was noted for her thorough research on sulfosalt, chlorosulfosalt minerals and on artificial minerals containing selenium. In 1978 her efforts were rewarded with the discovery of a new mineral, which she named Ardaite after river Arda.

Another part of her scientific work focused on paragenesis and mineralogy of gold and silver ores as well as on the polymetallic ore deposits containing gold in Sredna Gora and eastern Rhodope Mountains. She was successful in identifying more than 100 minerals and their varieties in these ore deposits.

Vesselina Breskovska's administrative positions included: Scientific Secretary of the Bulgarian Academy of Sciences (1973–1977), Dean of the Faculty of Geology and Geography (1980–1984) and Vice Rector in Charge of International Relations of Sofia University (1984–88). Since 1959 she had been a member of New Minerals Nomenclature and Classification Commission of the International Mineralogical Association, and was the general secretary of their 13th Congress. At the time of her death in 1997 she was president of the Bulgarian Mineralogical Society.

Her collection of minerals was preserved in the Museum of Mineralogy at Sofia University.

Breskovska had been a foreign member of the Russian Academy of Natural Sciences, honorary member of the Russian Mineralogical Society and a member of New York Academy of Sciences.

Her daughter, son-in-law and son have also been scientists.

== Publications ==
She was author of more than 130 scientific publications, including:

- Kostov, Ivan; Minčeva-Stefanova, J.; Breskovska, V.; Kirov, G. (1964). The Minerals in Bulgaria (in Bulgarian). Sofia: Bulgarian Academy of Sciences. OCLC 30695814.
- Kostov, Ivan; Breskovska, Vesselina (1989). Phosphate, Arsenate and Vanadate minerals: Crystal Chemistry and Classification. Sofia: Kliment Ohridski University Press. OCLC 30695814.

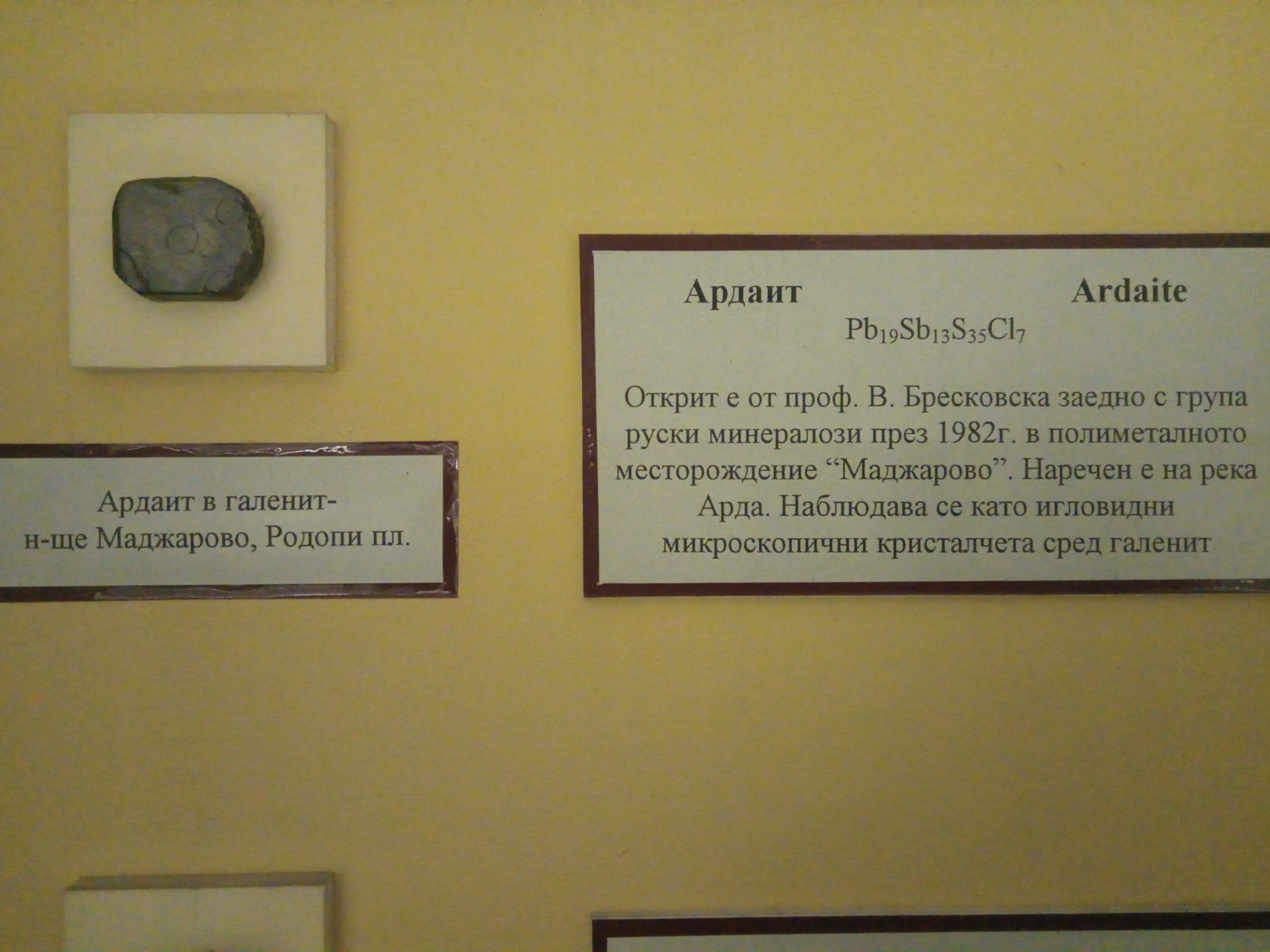
The mineral ardaite on display at the National Museum of Natural History, Bulgaria

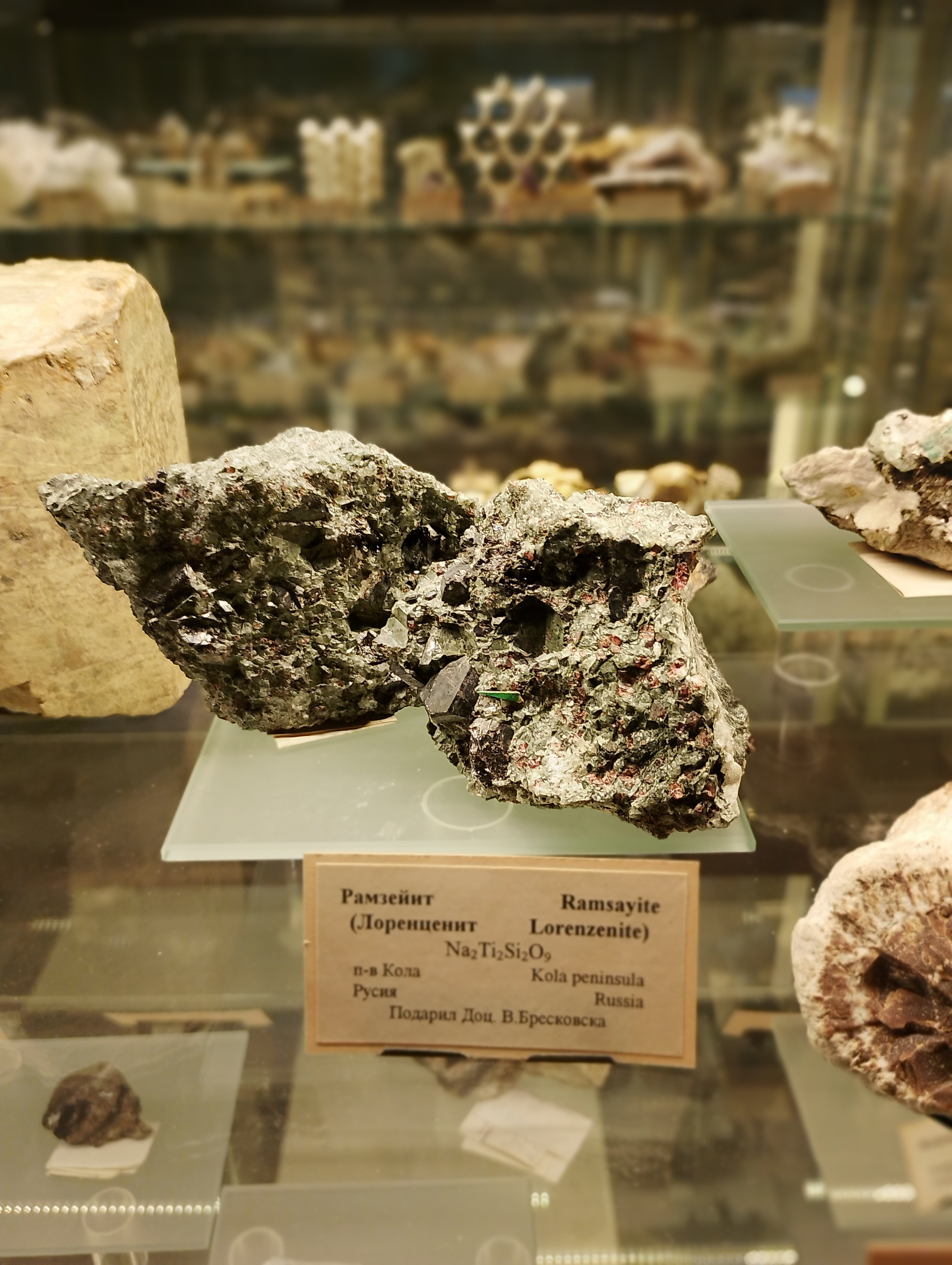
RAMSAYITE (Lorenzenite) from Kola Peninsula, Russia (coll. V. Breskovska) at the National Museum of Natural History, Bulgaria

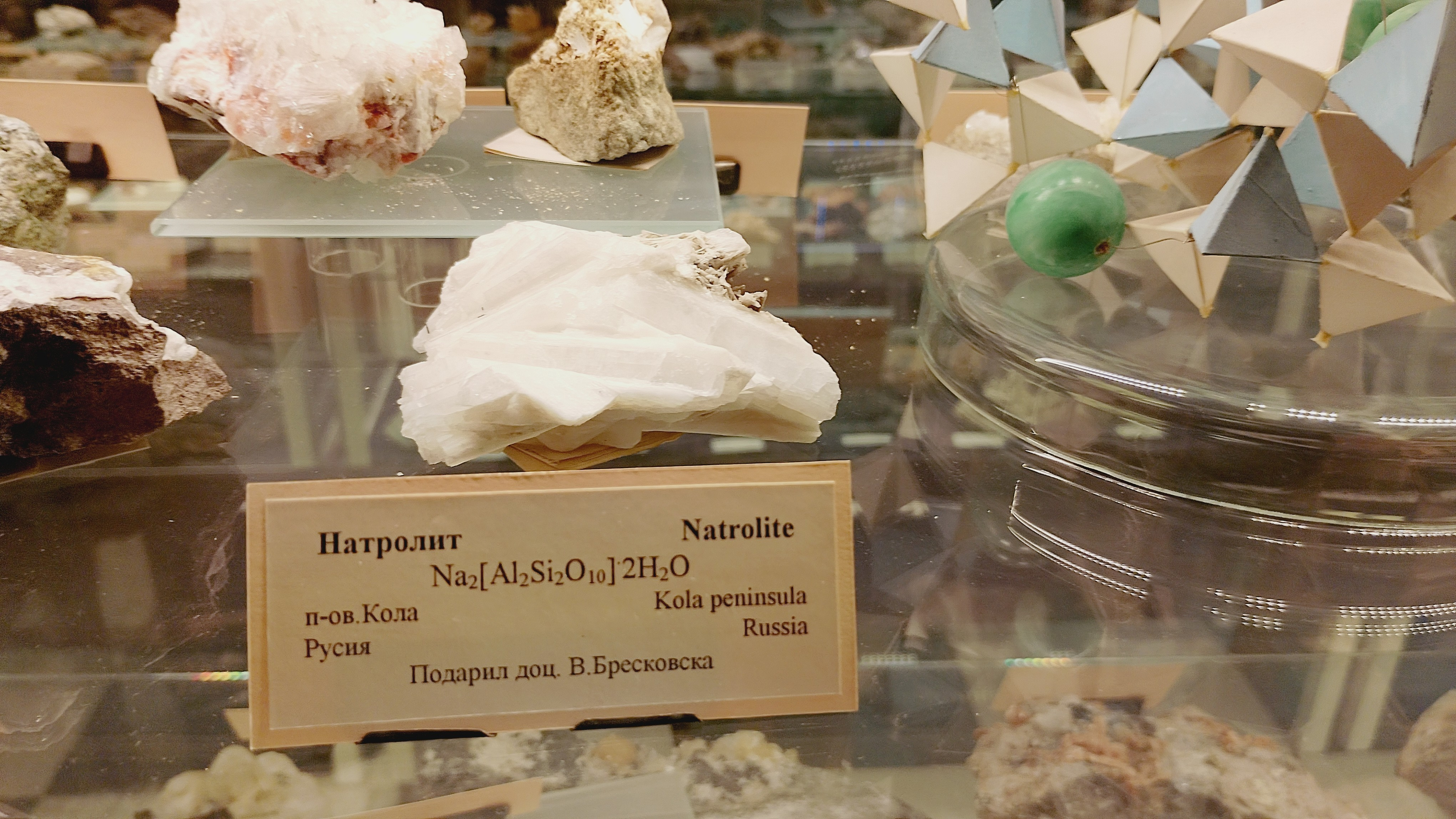
Natrolite from Kola Peninsula, Russia (coll. V. Breskovska) at the National Museum of Natural History, Bulgaria

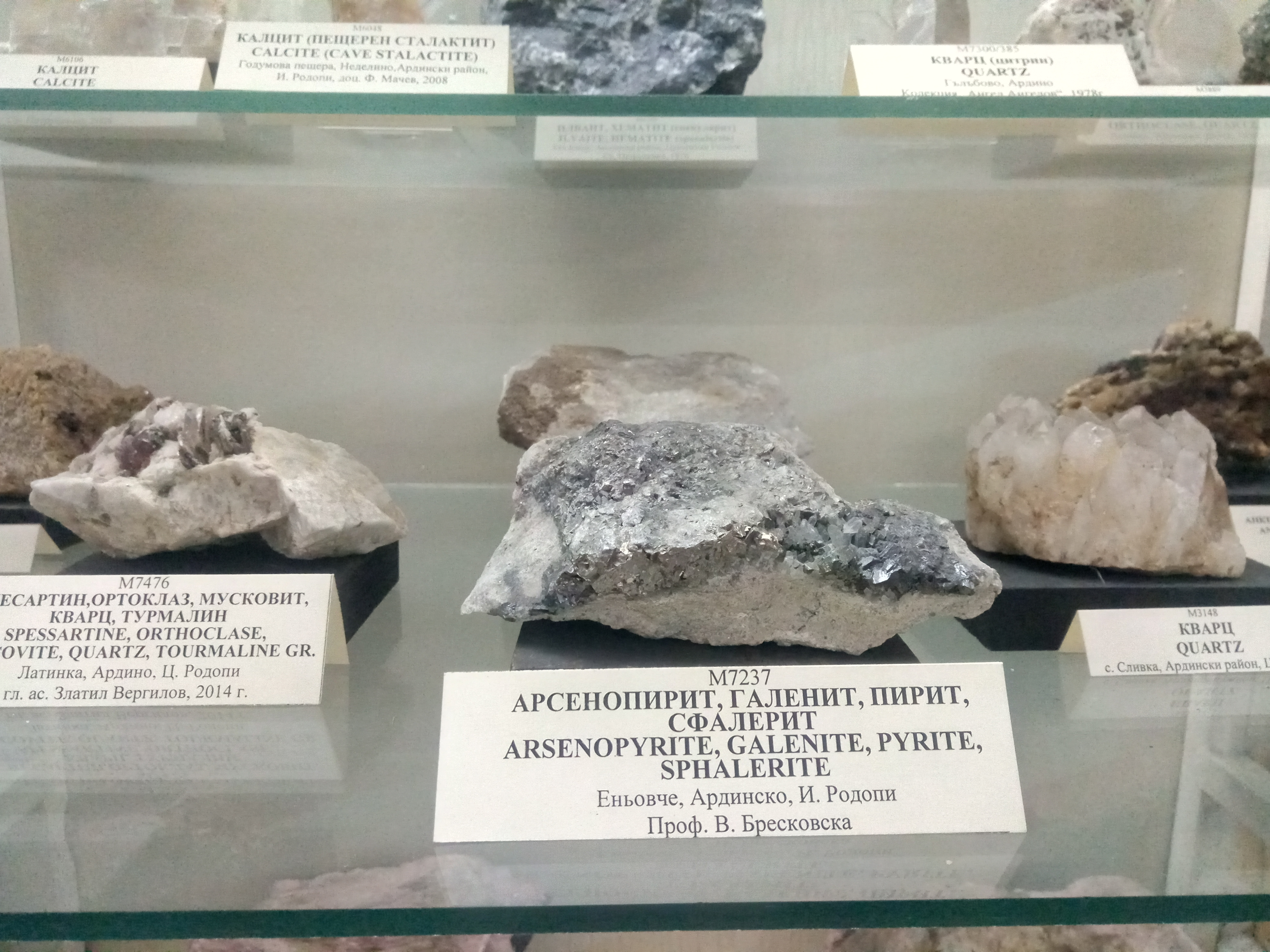
Arsenopyrite, Galena, Pyrite, Sphalerite (Enyovche, Eastern Rhodopes) - Collection of V. Breskovska at the Sofia University "St. Kliment Ohridski" Museum of Mineralogy, Petrology and Mineral Resources

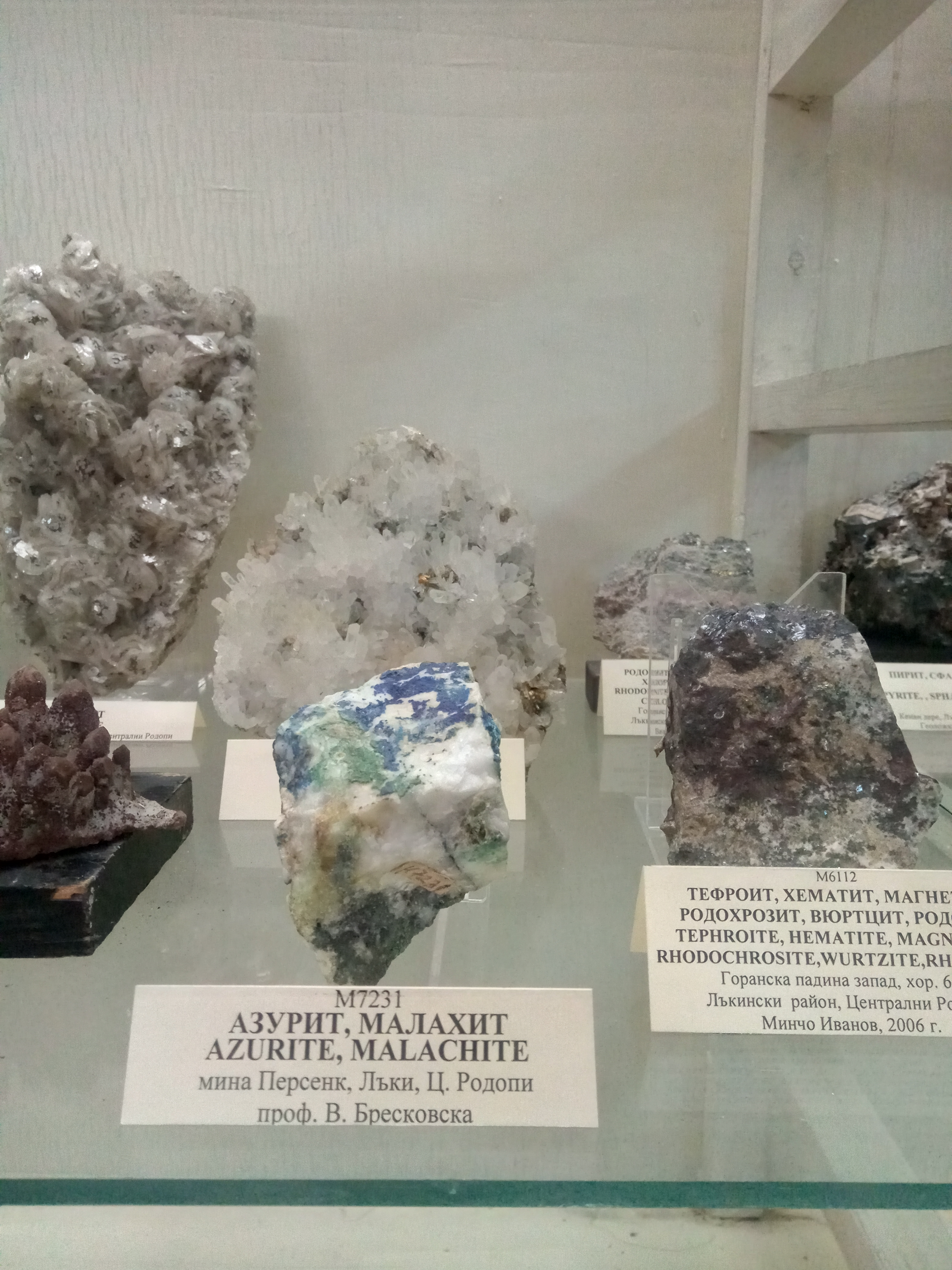
Azurite, Malachite (Laki, Plovdiv Province, Rhodope Mountains) - Collection V. Breskovska at the Sofia University "St. Kliment Ohridski" Museum of Mineralogy, Petrology and Mineral Resources

Gipsum (Madzharovo, Eastern Rhodopes) - COLL. V. BRESKOVSKA at the Sofia University "St. Kliment Ohridski" Museum of Mineralogy, Petrology and Mineral Resources

Molybdenite, Chalcopyrite, Quartz from Kladnitsa, Pernik Municipality, Vitosha - coll. V. Breskovska at the Sofia University "St. Kliment Ohridski" Museum of Mineralogy, Petrology and Mineral Resources

== See also ==
- List of minerals recognized by the International Mineralogical Association
