= Knyazhevsko =

Knyazhevsko Княжевско
- Village
- Location within Bulgaria
- Coordinates: 42.216667°N 25.783333°E
- Country: Bulgaria
- Province: Stara Zagora Province
- Municipality: Opan Municipality

Area
  - Land: 15,496 km^{2} (5,983 sq mi)
- Elevation: 199 m (653 ft)

Population
  - Total: 128
  - Density: 826/km^{2} (2,140/sq mi)

Knyazhevsko is a village in Southern Bulgaria, located in Stara Zagora Province, Opan Municipality. As of the June 2020 Bulgarian Census, Knyazhevsko has a population count of 128 inhabitants.

== Geography ==
The village is located 14 kilometers away from Galabovo and 28 kilometers away from the regional center Stara Zagora. The village is at elevation between 100 and 199 meters above sea level.

== History and culture ==
The former names of the village used to be "Pishmana", "Tsaritsa Yoana", and "Razkayanie". It bears its current name Knyazhevsko since 1980. It was named after Zahari Knyazhevski.

The Agriculture in Knyazhevsko is well developed. People mainly grow fodder crops – barley, wheat, corn; oilseeds – sunflower, rapeseed; vegetable and fruit trees.

Sheep and goats are also raised in herds and cows can be found in nearby farms. The village is like most Bulgarian villages, which have more elderly people left. Younger folk often return to their homes for the weekends.

There are several small and medium enterprises operating in the village, which develop trade, agriculture and animal husbandry. The fair of the village is in October on Petkovden.

=== Infrastructure ===
There is a church and a community hall in the village.

The community hal was built in 1931 and was named after "Zaharii Knyazhevski", the patron of the village.

There is no school in the village.
