= Viden =

Viden or Vídeň may refer to places:

- Vídeň, a municipality and village in the Czech Republic
- Vienna, called Vídeň in Czech, a city in Austria
- Viden, Bulgaria, a village in Stara Zagora Province, Bulgaria

== See also ==
- Vidin, a city in Bulgaria
