= Veren =

Veren Верен
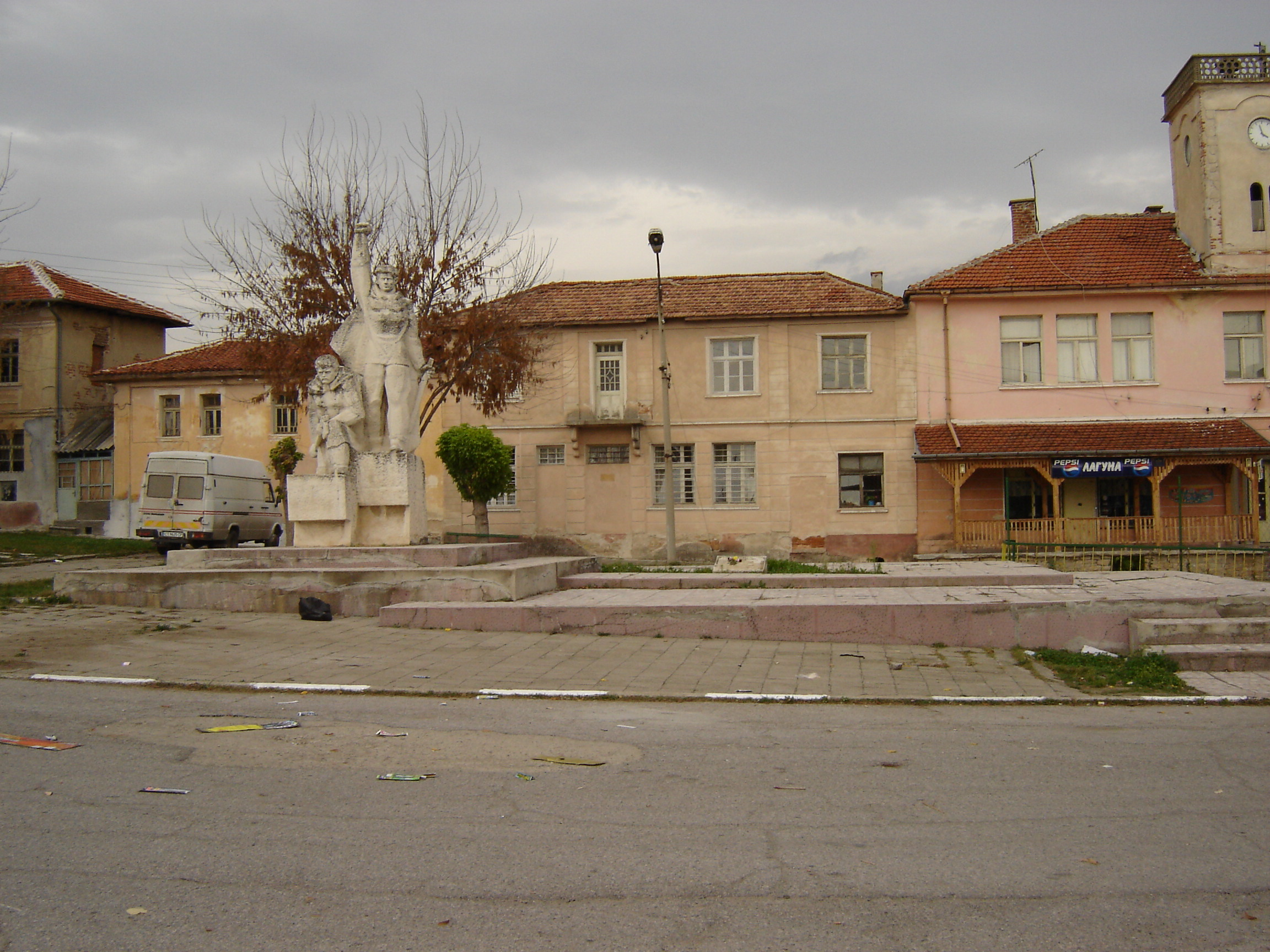

- Location of Veren, Bulgaria
- Coordinates: 42°20′56.1″N 25°11′19.72″E
- Country: Bulgaria
- Provinces (Oblast): Stara Zagora Province
- Elevation: 280 m (920 ft)

Population (15.09.2022)
  - Total: 178
- Time zone: UTC+2 (EET)
  - Summer (DST): UTC+3 (EEST)
- Postal Code: 6244
- Area codes: 04137 from Bulgaria, 003594137 from outside

Veren (Bulgarian: Верен) is a village in central Bulgaria. It has a population of 178 as of 2022.

== Geography ==
Veren is located in Stara Zagora Province and has a territory of 19.787 km^{2}. It is part of Bratya Daskalovi Municipality and lies 6 km north of the municipal center Bratya Daskalovi. It also has a direct road connection to the neighbouring villages of Pravoslav to the west and Medovo to the northeast. Veren is situated in the Chirpan Heights of the Sredna Gora mountain range.

== Economy ==
Agriculture is the most important economic sector. To the north of the village there are meadows and forests, while to the south there are farmlands, growing cereals, sunflower, maize, orchards and grapes.
