= Kovachevo, Stara Zagora Province =

Coordinates: 42°14′N 026°04′E

Kovachevo (Bulgarian: Ковачево) is a village in southern Bulgaria, located in the municipality of Radnevo in the Stara Zagora Province.

Kovachevo is the location of the Maritsa Iztok-2 power station. This power station was ranked as the industrial facility that is causing the highest damage costs to health and the environment in Bulgaria and the entire European Union.
