= Ivan Kostov Nikolov =

Bulgarian mineralogist

Ivan Kostov HonFGS HonFMinSoc
- Иван Костов Николов
- Born: 24 December 1913 O.S. Plovdiv, Kingdom of Bulgaria
- Died: 31 March 2004 (aged 90); Sofia, Republic of Bulgaria
- Resting place: Central Sofia Cemetery; 42°42′45.3″N 023°20′09.6″E
- Citizenship: Bulgarian
- Education: Sofia University "St. Kliment Ohridski"; Royal School of Mines; London Imperial College
- Known for: Kostov's Classification of Minerals
- Spouse: Maria Zgurova Slavova-Kostova
- Children: Ruslan Ivanov Kostov; Fanny Ivanova Bratanova
- Parents: Kosta Nikolov Stoilov (father); Fanko Nikolova (mother)
- Scientific career
- Fields: mineralogy geology X-ray crystallography
- Workplaces: Sofia University "St. Kliment Ohridski"; London Imperial College; Bulgarian Academy of Sciences; National Museum of Natural History (Bulgaria)
- Thesis: Genesis of the Iron Ore Castle Deposit Krepost (Bulgaria); D.I.C. (1941)

Ivan Kostov Nikolov (Bulgarian: Иван Костов Николов) HonFGS HonFMinSoc (December 24, 1913 (O.S.) in Plovdiv, Bulgaria – March 31, 2004 in Sofia, Bulgaria), Aka Ivan Kostov, was a Bulgarian geologist, mineralogist and crystallographer.

== Biography ==
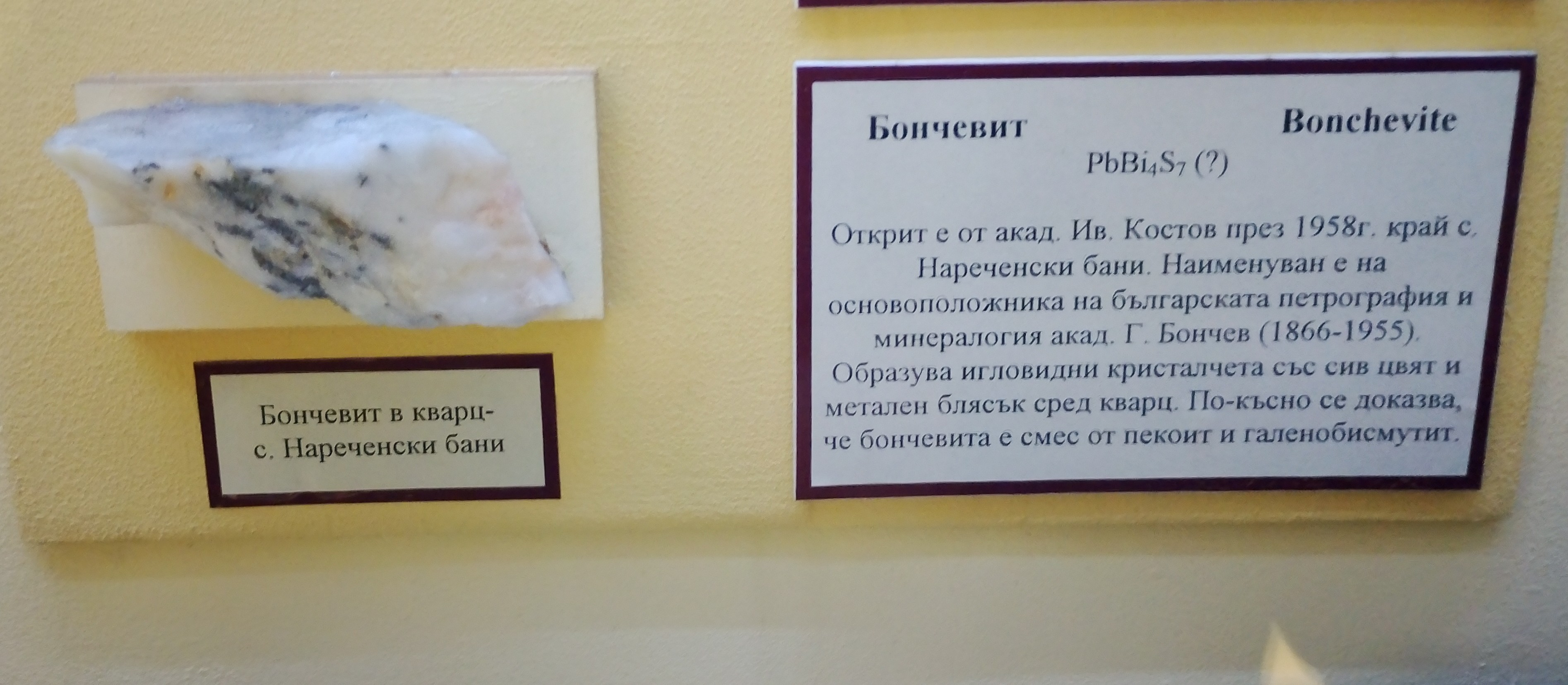
EXHIBIION OF THE MINERAL BONCHEVITE FROM NARECHENSKI BANI, DISCOVERED BY IVAN KOSTOV IN 1958 - NATIONAL MUSEUM OF NATURAL HISTORY, SOFIA, BULGARIA

Ivan Kostov Nikolov was born in Plovdiv on 24 December 1913 (O.S.). He was the second son in the numerous family of Kosta Nikolov, a real estate developer, and his wife, Fanka Nikolova, a housewife. He attended primary and secondary school in his native town and was inspired by walking trips in the Rhodope Mountains. In 1932 he commenced his studies in natural history at Sofia University, graduating in 1936. In 1936 Ivan Kostov was appointed assistant in the Mineralogical-Petrographical Institute at Sofia University. In 1940 he was awarded a scholarship by the British Council and began his studies at the Royal School of Mines of Imperial College in London. In 1941 he received D.I.C. In 1943 he was elected Fellow of the Geological Society of London. He remained in London during the Second World War and published papers on ore deposits in Bulgaria and other parts of the world in the Mining Magazine. He also worked as a translator for the Bulgarian Service of the BBC.

Upon his return to Bulgaria in 1945 he was elected associate professor and later to the chair of mineralogy, petrology and crystallography at Sofia University.

In 1961 Ivan Kostov was elected corresponding member of the Bulgarian Academy of Sciences and later, in 1966, a full member of the Bulgarian Academy of Sciences.

In 1965 he was elected Foreign Member of the Geological Society of London (the title was later changed to Honorary Fellow).

He served as Director of the National Museum of Natural History in Sofia from 1974 until his retirement in 1989.

== Honors and recognitions ==
- President of the International Mineralogical Association (1982–1986)
- Honorary Fellow of the Geological Society of London
- Honorary Member of the Mineralogical Society of Great Britain and Ireland
- Honorary Member of the German Academy of Sciences Leopoldina
- Foreign Honorary Member of the Russian Mineralogical Society
- Foreign Member of the USSR Academy of Sciences
- Founder and Honorary President of the Bulgarian Mineralogical Society
- Doctor Honoris Causa of the Bulgarian Academy of Sciences
- Honorary citizen of Plovdiv
- The Institute of Mineralogy and Crystallography at the Bulgarian Academy of Sciences was named after him.
- The mineral kostovite was named in his honour.
- A genus of cretaceous ammonites was named in his honour.

== Selected publications ==
- Костов, Иван (2003). "Минералите - парадигма на живота" (PDF). Списание на българското геологическо дружество (in Bulgarian and English). 64 (1–3): 5–13.
- Kostov, I. (2000). "Mineral classifications re-visited with emphasis on paragenetic-structural system" (PDF). Geochemistry, Mineralogy, Petrology (37): 5–11.
- Kostov, Ivan; Kostov, Ruslan I. (1999). Crystal Habits of Minerals. Sofia: Academic Publishing House "Marin Drinov". ISBN 9789546420602. OCLC 488807766.
- Kostov, Ruslan I.; Kostov, Ivan (1989). "Infinite Symmetry Applied to Crystals and Crystal Aggregates". Crystal Research and Technology. 24 (9): 847–852. Bibcode:1989CryRT..24..847K. doi:10.1002/crat.2170240902.
- Kostov, Ivan; Breskovska, Vesselina (1989). Phosphate, Arsenate and Vanadate minerals: Crystal Chemistry and Classification. Sofia: Kliment Ohridski University Press. OCLC 30695814.
- Kostov, Ivan; Minčeva-Stefanova, J. (1982). Sulphide Minerals: Crystal Chemistry, Paragenesis and Systematics. Stuttgart: Schweizerbartische Verlagsbuchhandlung. OCLC 9306473 – via Internet Archive.
- Kostov, Ivan (1972). "Mineralogia". In Castellucci, Emilio; Golino, Gilberto; Maglietta, Marino; Martini, Giacomo; Ponticelli, Fabio; Priami, Licia; Torrini, Marco (eds.). Enciclopedia della Chimica (in Italian). Vol. VII. Firenze: Uses Edizione Scientifiche. pp. 556–567.
- Kostov, I. (1972). "The Structural Patterns of Crystal Faces and Crystal Growth". Kristall und Technik. 7 (1–3): 27–35. doi:10.1002/crat.19720070106.
- Kostov, Ivan (1968). Embrey, Peter G.; Phemister, James (eds.). Mineralogy. Translated by Kostov, Ivan. Edinburgh & London: Oliver & Boyd. ISBN 978-0-05-001667-1. OCLC 42358.
- Kostov, Ivan (1965). "Paragenesis, crystal chemistry and classification of minerals". Годишник на Софийския университет. Геолого-географски факултет. Книга 1 - Геология; Annuaire de l'Université de Sofia. Faculté de géologie et géographie. Livre 1 - Géologie. 58 (1): 99–116.
- Kostov, Ivan; Minčeva-Stefanova, J.; Breskovska, V.; Kirov, G. (1964). The Minerals in Bulgaria (in Bulgarian). Sofia: Bulgarian Academy of Sciences. OCLC 30695814.
- Kostov, Ivan (1961). "The Genesis of Kyanite in Quartz Veins". International Geology Review. 3 (8): 645–651. Bibcode:1961IGRv....3..645K. doi:10.1080/00206816109473627.
- Kostov, Ivan (June 1958). "Bonchevite, PbBi_{4}S_{7}, a New Mineral" (PDF). Mineralogical Magazine. 31 (241): 821–828. Bibcode:1958MinM...31..821K. doi:10.1180/minmag.1958.031.241.02.

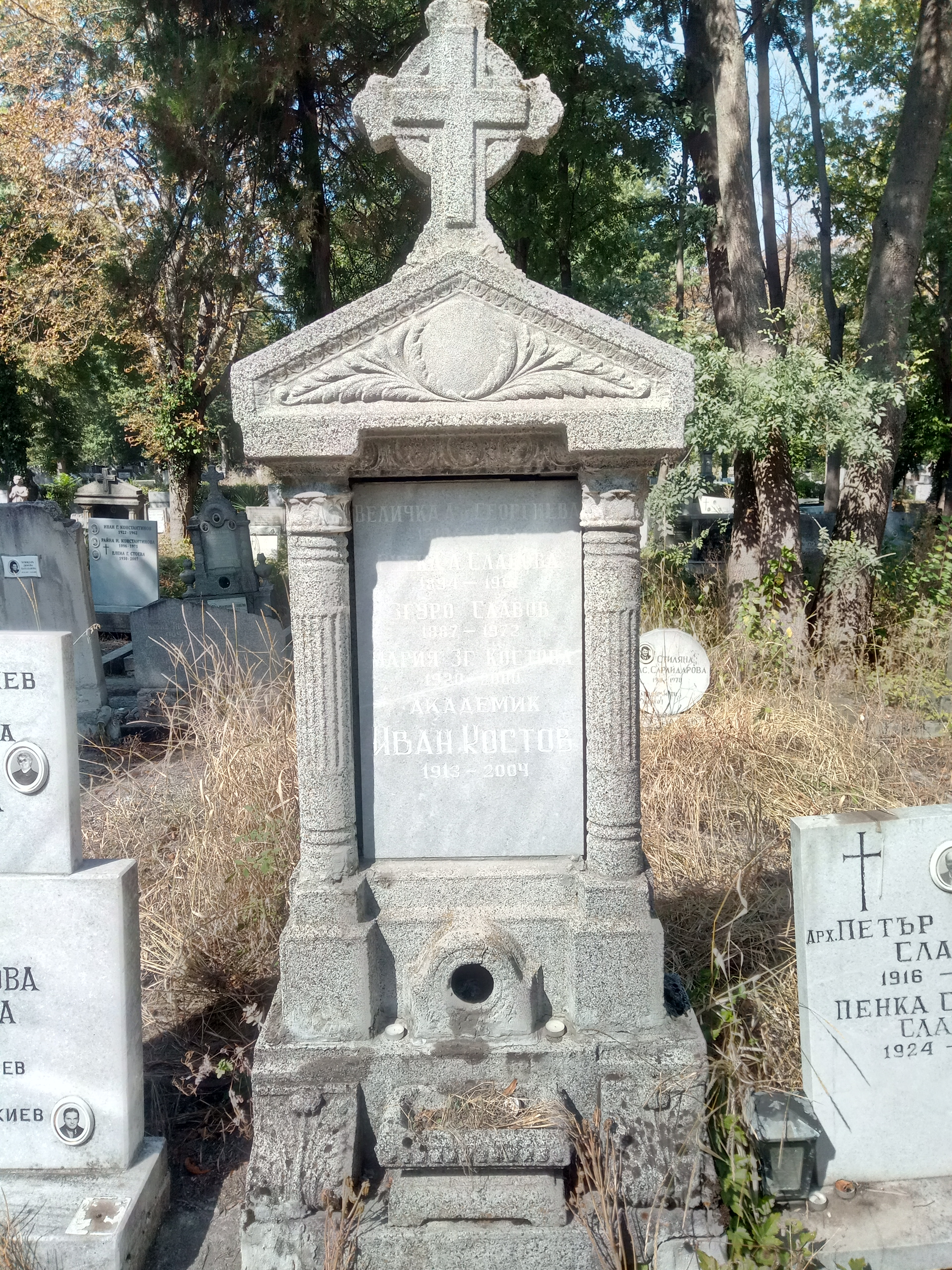
The grave of Ivan Kostov at Sofia Central Cemetery - 42°42′45.3″N 023°20′09.6″E

== See also ==
- List of minerals recognized by the International Mineralogical Association
- Sigmund Zois
