= Sredets =

Sredets may refer to:

- Sredets, Burgas Province, a town in eastern Bulgaria previously known as Karabunar and Grudovo
- Sredets (medieval Bulgaria), a historical name of today's Sofia, Bulgaria
- Sredets, Sofia, a city district in Sofia
- Sredets, Stara Zagora Province, a village in Opan Municipality, central Bulgaria
- Sredets, Smolyan Province, a village in Nedelino Municipality, south-central Bulgaria
