= Granit oak =

Ancient tree in Granit, Bulgaria

Coordinates: 42.254067°N 25.136080°E

Granit Oak
- Гранитски дъб
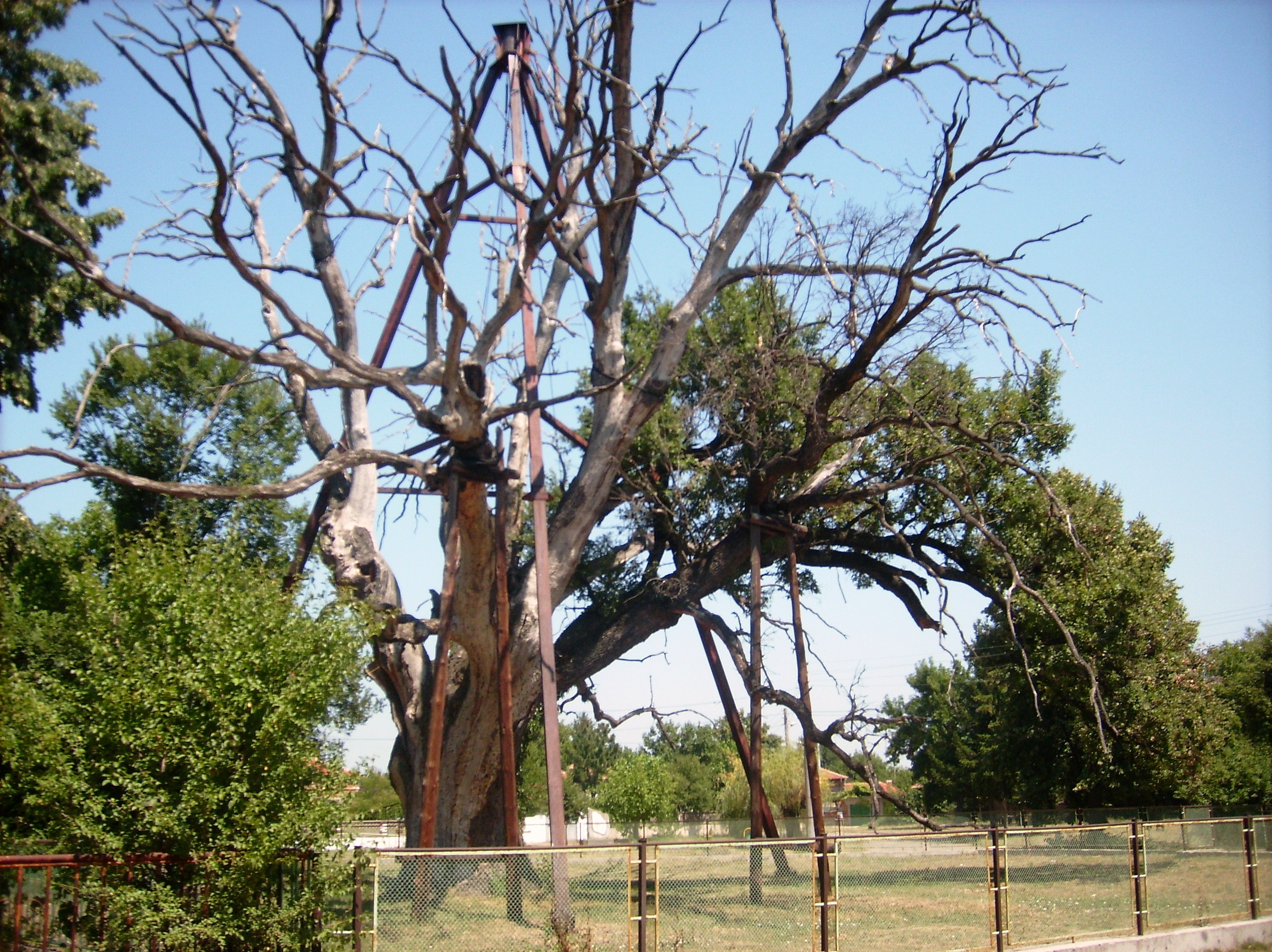
- Interactive map of Granit Oak
- Location: Granit, Bulgaria

The Granit oak (Bulgarian: Гранитски дъб) is a pedunculate oak (Quercus robur) tree that grows within the boundaries of Granit village, Bulgaria.

== Description ==
The oak measures 2.38 m (7 ft 10 in) in diameter and 7.46 m (24.5 ft) in girth at waist level and reaches 23.4 m (77 ft) in height, but only eastern side branches remain alive.

== History ==
In March 1982, samples were taken with a pressler drill, from which it was estimated that the tree was 1637 years old. With an estimated germination date of 345 AD, it is the oldest tree in Bulgaria and one of the oldest in Europe.

In 1967 the Granit oak was declared a protected tree and included in the list of the natural monuments of Bulgaria.

In 2010 the oak was featured prominently in a documentary Live Eternity (in Bulgarian: Жива Вечност).

== See also ==
- Baikushev's pine
- List of individual trees
- List of oldest trees

== Gallery ==
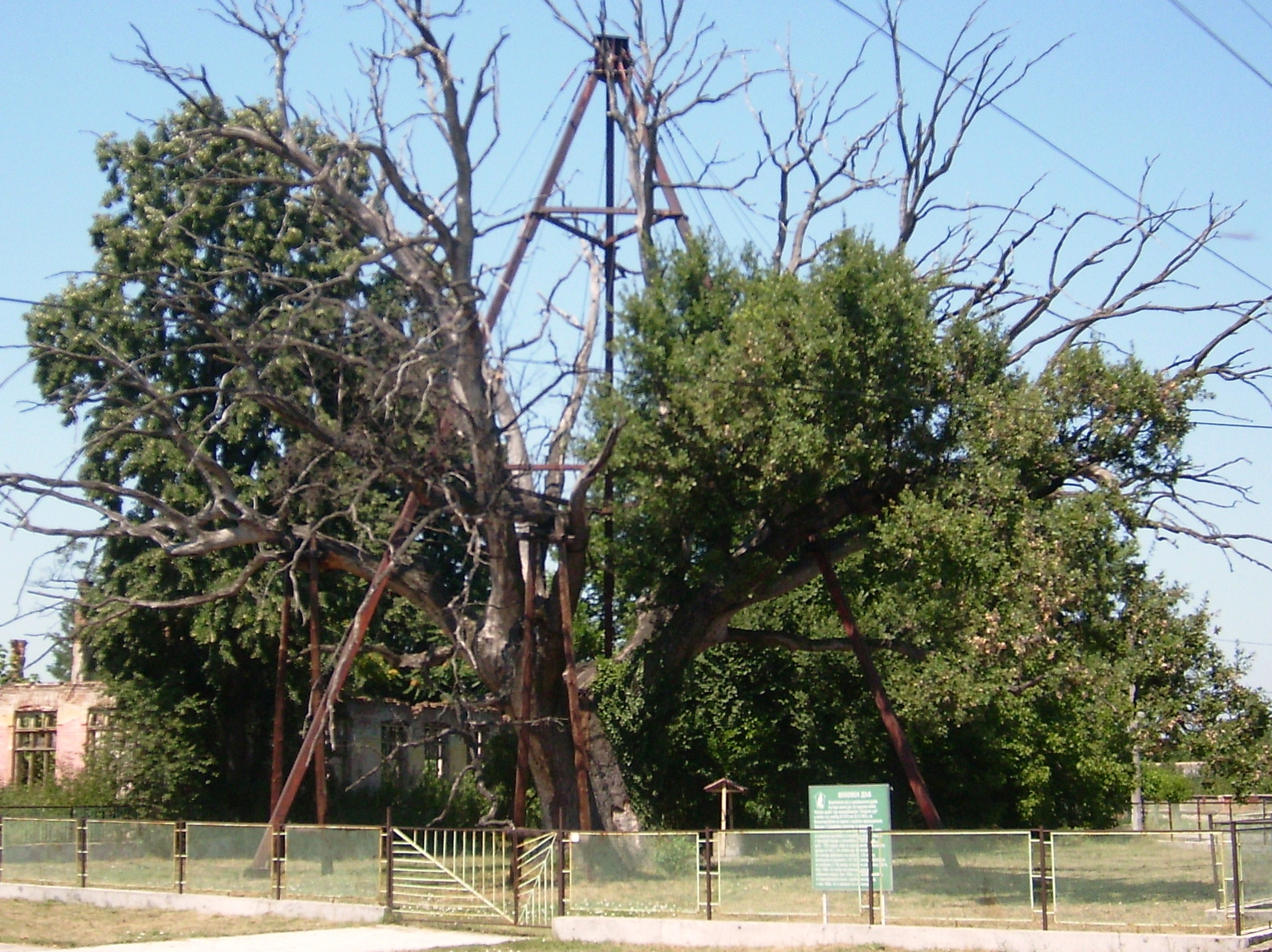
The Granit oak in August 2011

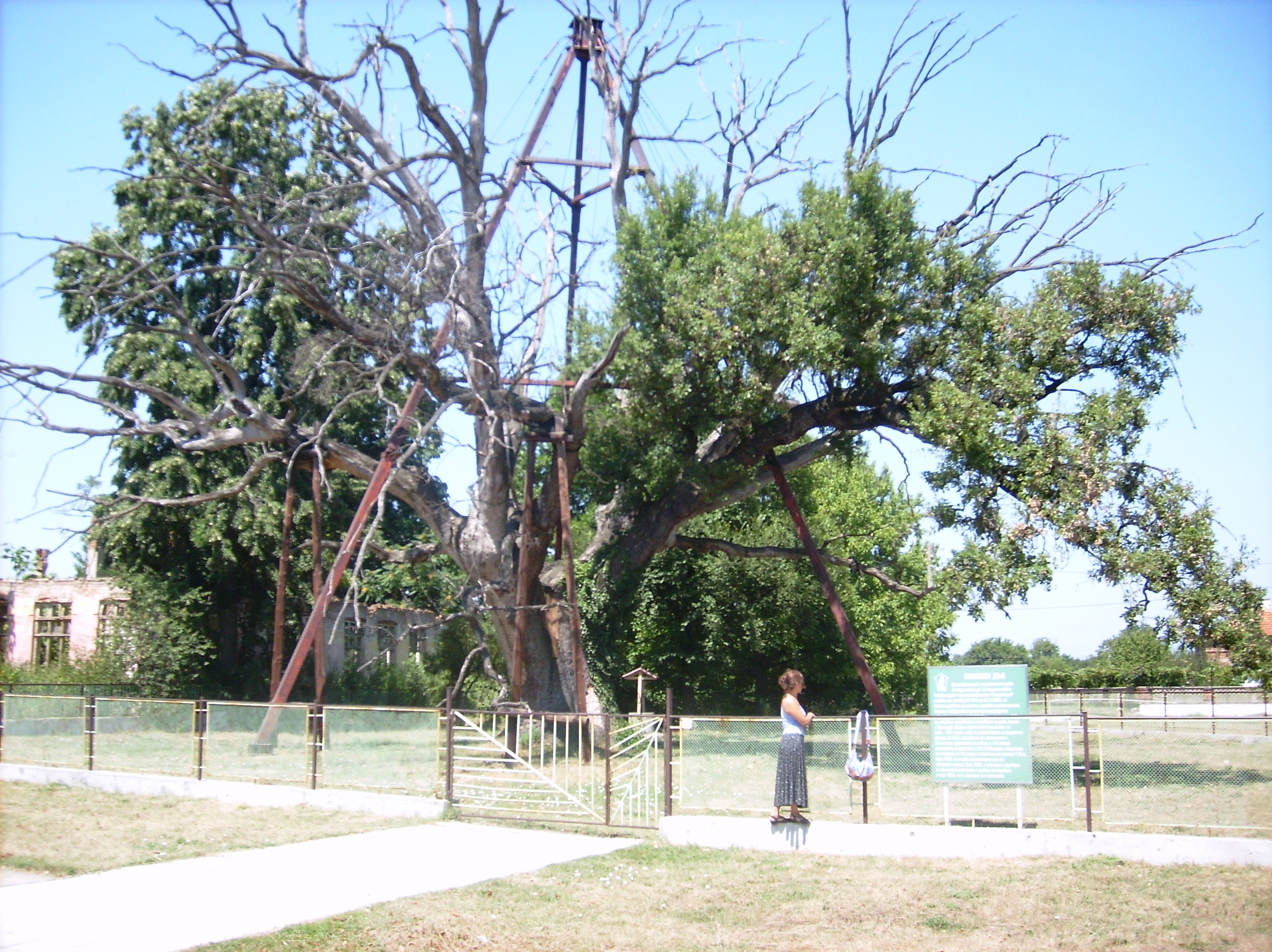
The Granit oak

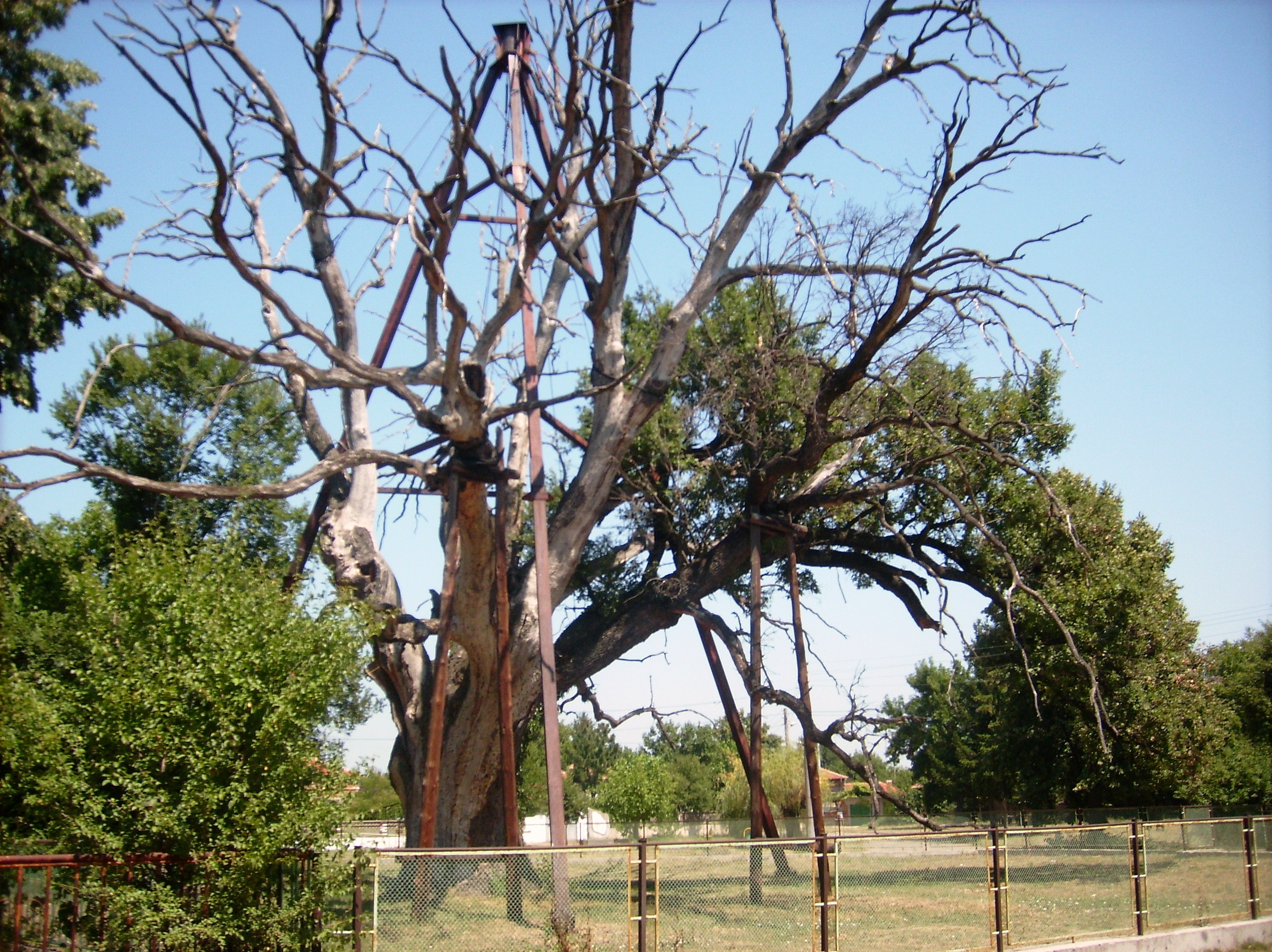
The Granit oak

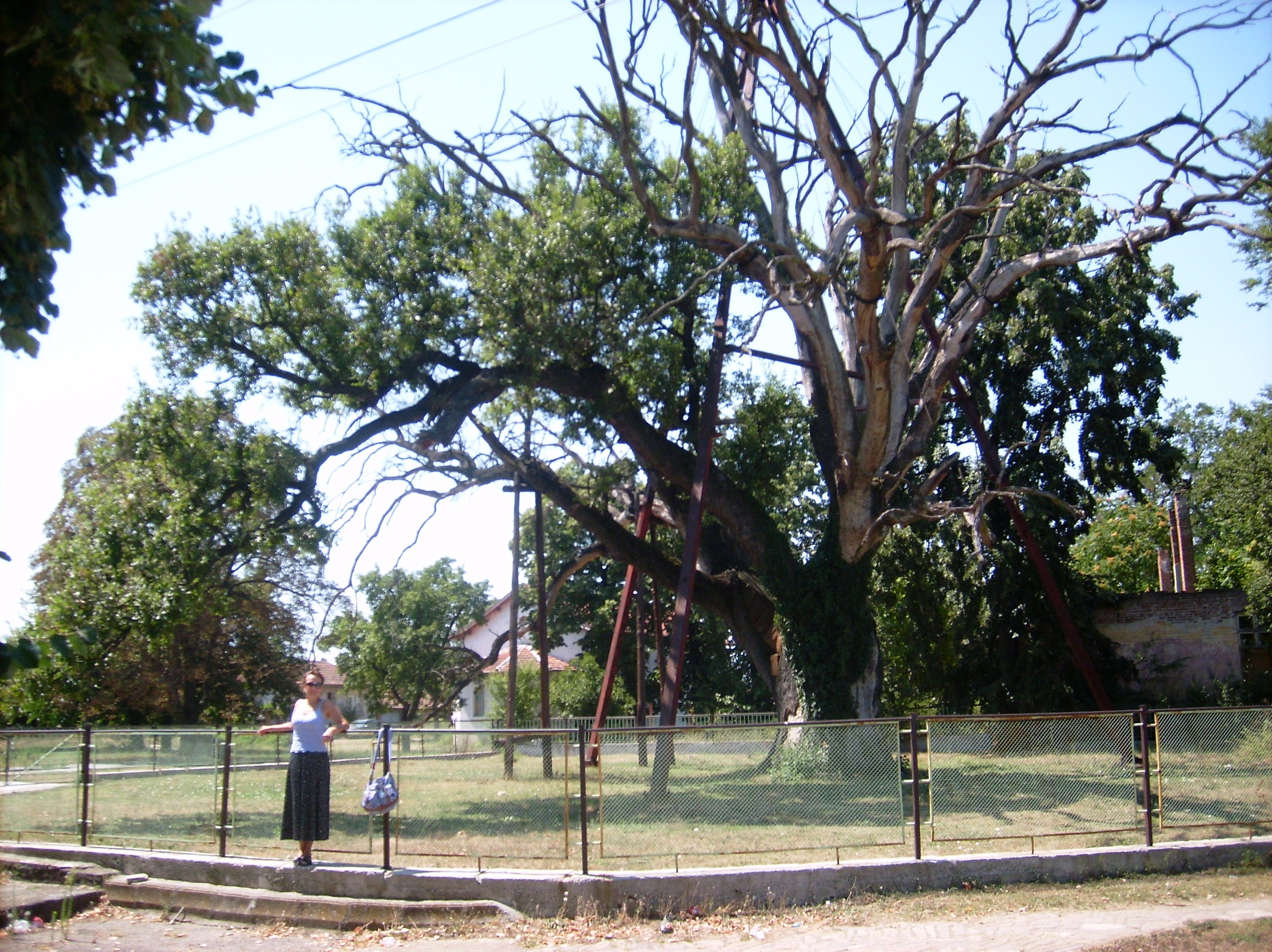
The Granit oak
