= Sulitsa (village) =

Sulitsa Cyлицa
- Village
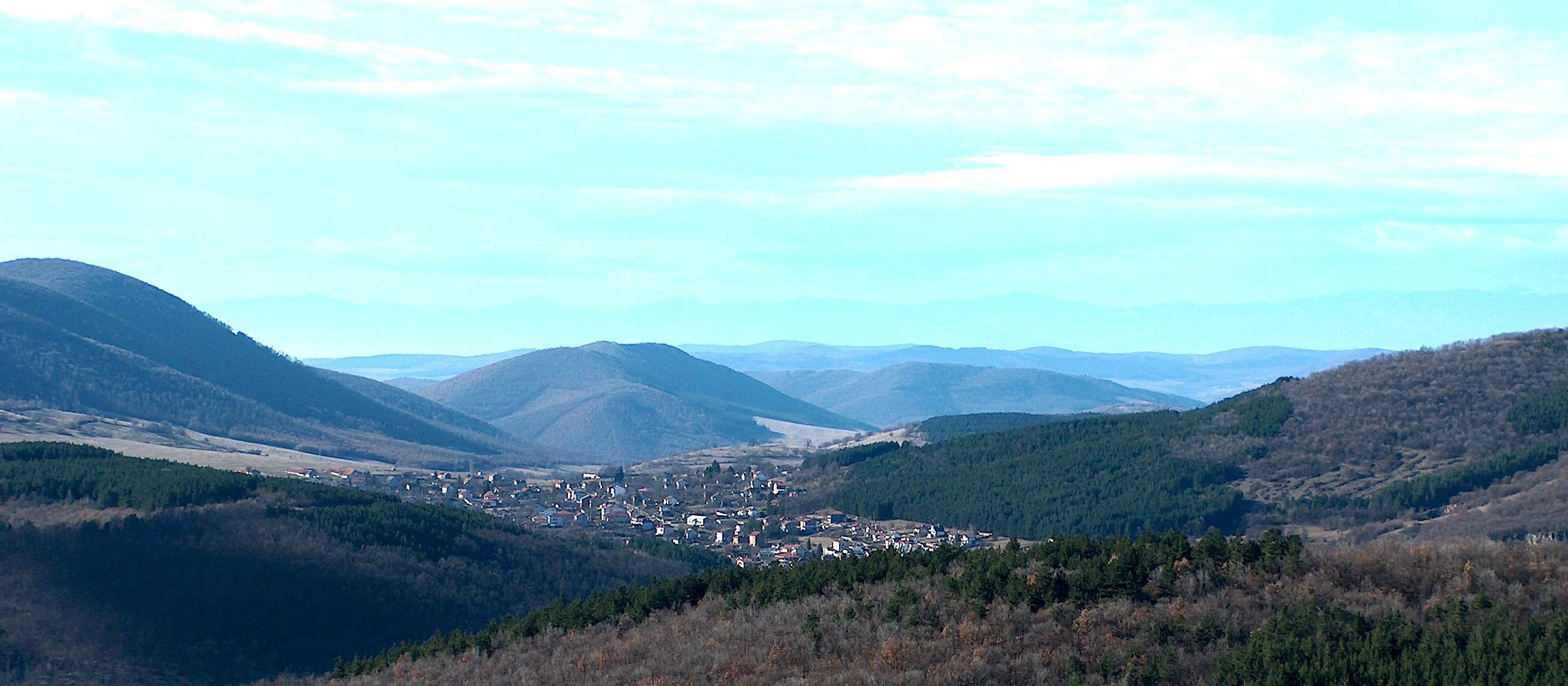
- Sulitsa from afar

- Location within Bulgaria
- Coordinates: 42.438363°N 25.480553°E
- Country: Bulgaria
- Province: Stara Zagora Province
- Municipality: Stara Zagora Municipality

Population (2014)
  - Total: 146

Sulitsa (Bulgarian: Cyлицa, pronounced [soˈlit͡sɐ]) is a village in Stara Zagora Municipality, Stara Zagora Province, Bulgaria.

== Geography ==
Sulitsa is located below Stara Planina and Sredna Gora. It is situated in a shallow valley, as it is surrounded on almost all sides by high hills. On road, Sulitsa is 18 kilometers from Stara Zagora, the nearest city.
