= Viden, Bulgaria =

Viden Виден
- Village
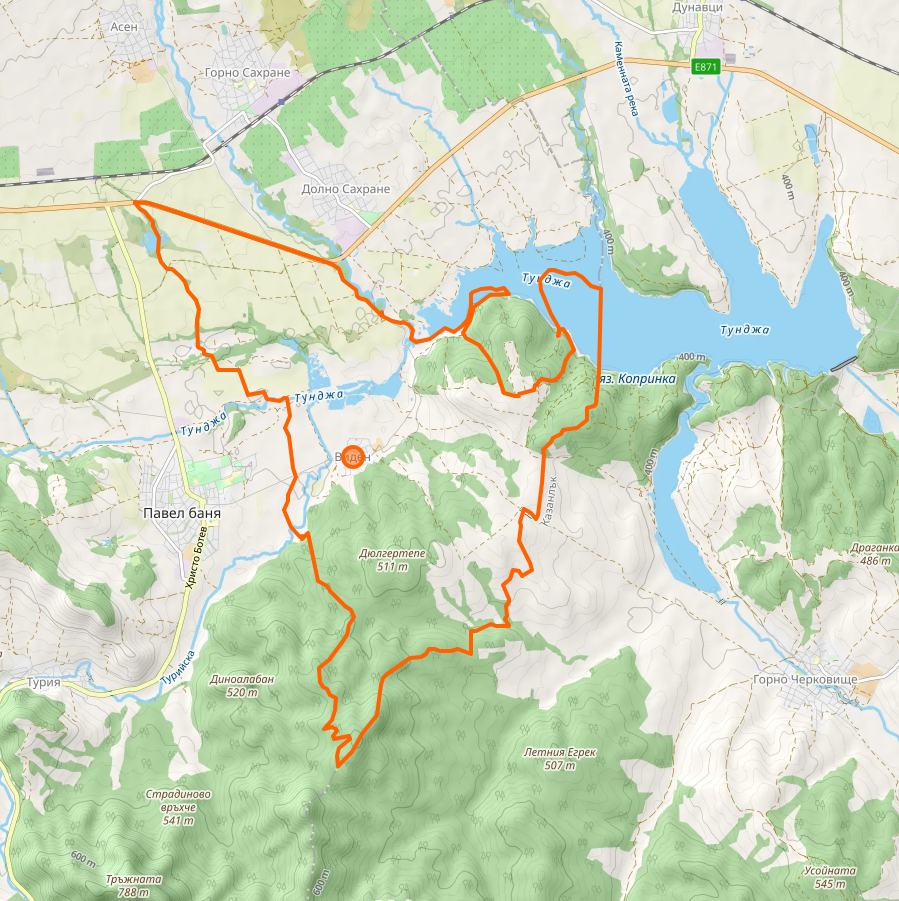
- Map showing the location of Viden village

- Location in Bulgaria
- Coordinates: 42.602°N 25.237°E

Population (2021)
  - Total: 83
- Time zone: UTC+2 (EET)
  - Summer (DST): UTC+3 (EEST)
- Postal code: 6158
- Area code: +359 4361

Viden (Bulgarian: Виден; Bulgarian pronunciation: [ˈvidɛn]) is a small village in central Bulgaria, located within the Pavel Banya Municipality of the Stara Zagora Province. Viden is located in the Karlovo Valley. It lies near where the Tundzha river flows into the Koprinka Reservoir. As of 2021, the village has 83 inhabitants.
