= Kostovite =

Rare orthorhombic-pyramidal gray white telluride mineral

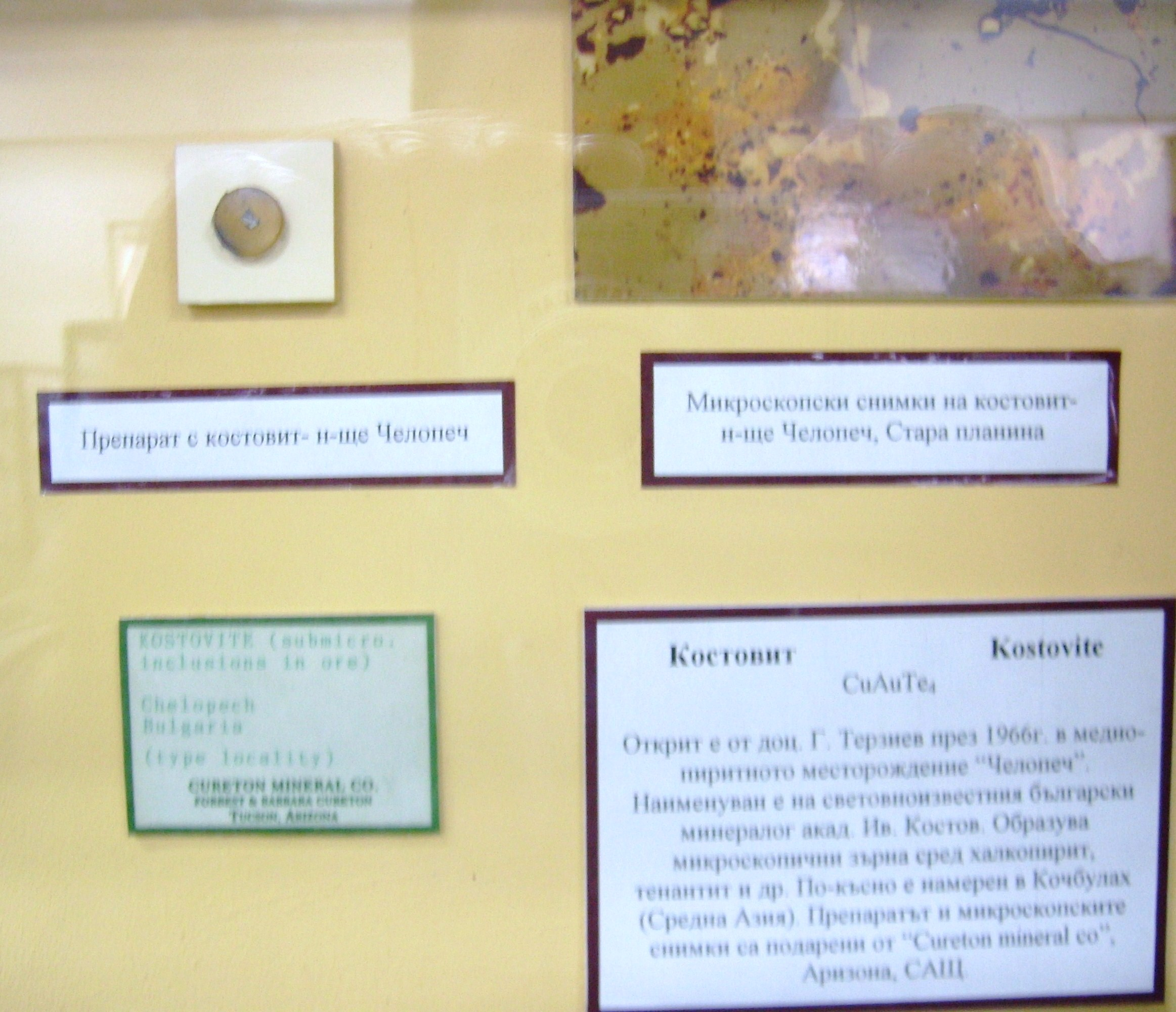
- Exhibition of Kostovite in the National Natural History Museum, Sofia, Bulgaria

General
- Category: Telluride mineral
- Formula: AuCuTe_{4}
- IMA symbol: Ktv
- Strunz classification: 2.EA.15 (10 ed); 2/D.16-10 (8 ed)
- Dana classification: 02.12.13.4
- Crystal system: Orthorhombic
- Crystal class: Pyramidal (mm2); H-M Symbol: (mm2)
- Space group: Pma2

Identification
- Color: Grayish white
- Twinning: Fine lamellar
- Cleavage: Distinct/good
- Tenacity: Brittle
- Mohs scale hardness: 2 – 2.5
- Luster: Metallic
- Diaphaneity: Opaque
- Specific gravity: 7.94
- Optical properties: Anisotropic
- Pleochroism: Visible

Kostovite (IMA symbol: Ktv) is a rare orthorhombic-pyramidal gray white telluride mineral containing copper and gold with chemical formula AuCuTe_{4}.

== Discovery and occurrence ==
It was discovered by Bulgarian mineralogist Georgi Ivanov Terziev, who named it in honor of his professor Ivan Kostov (Иван Костов) (1913–2004). In 1965 kostovite was approved as a new species by the International Mineralogical Association. The type locality is Chelopech copper ore deposit, Bulgaria. Small deposits have also been found in Kochbulak (Eastern Uzbekistan), Commoner mine (Zimbabwe), Kamchatka (Russian Far East), Ashanti (Ghana), Buckeye Gulch (Leadville, Colorado, US), Bisbee (Arizona, US), Kutemajärvi (Finland), Coranda-Hondol (Romania), Glava (Sweden), Bereznjakovskoje (Southern Urals, Russia), Moctezuma (Sonora, Mexico), Panormos Bay (Tinos Island, Greece), Guilaizhuang Mine, Tongshi complex (Linyi Prefecture, Shandong Province, China), Kalgoorlie-Boulder City, (Goldfields-Esperance region, Western Australia, Australia).

== See also ==
- List of minerals named after people
