= Ardaite =

Very rare sulfosalt mineral

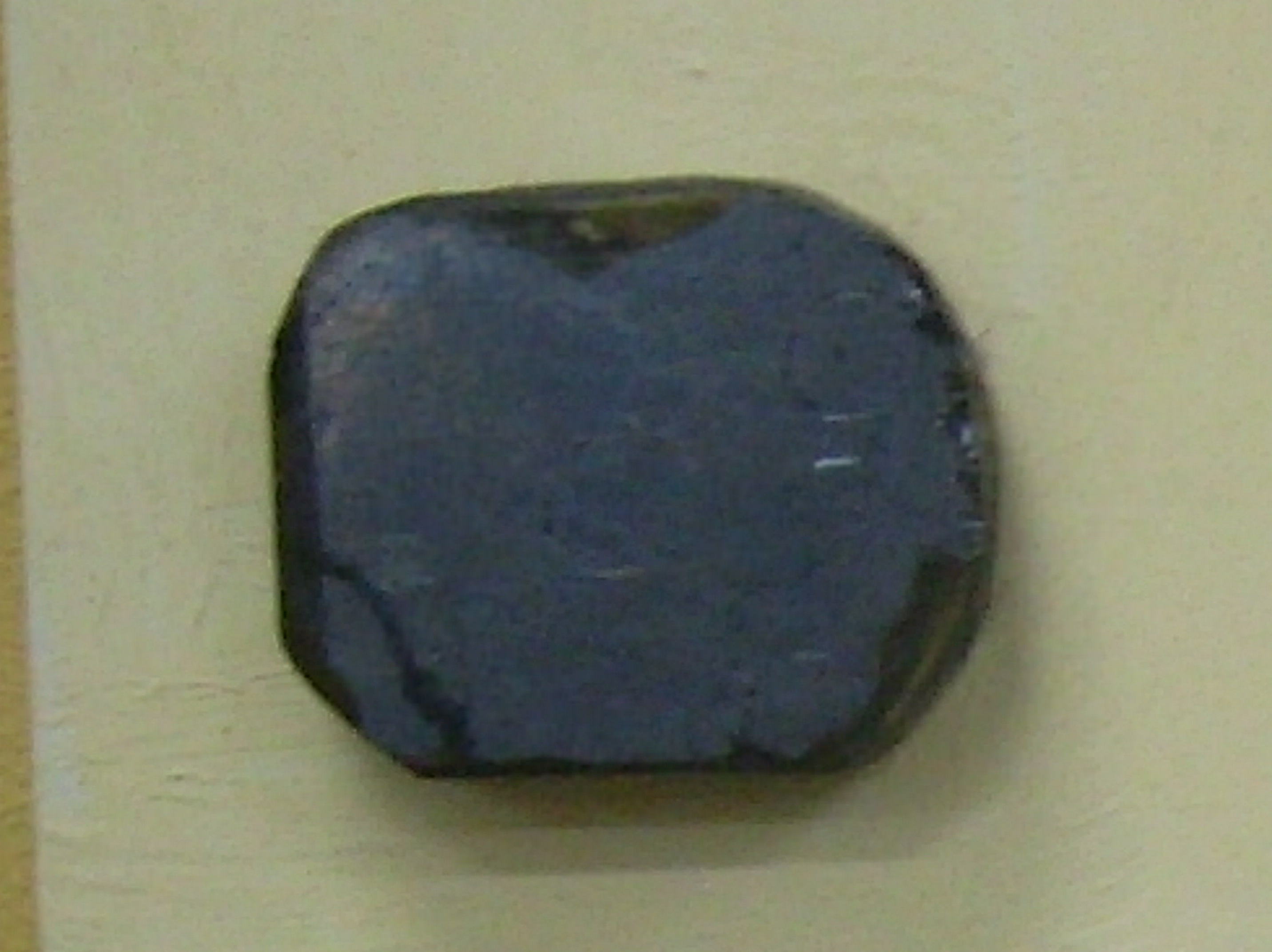
- Ardaite associated with galena, Madjarovo polymetallic ore deposit, National Museum of Natural History, Bulgaria

General
- Category: Sulfosalt minerals, Lead minerals
- Formula: Pb_{19}Sb_{13}S_{35}Cl_{7}
- IMA symbol: Ada
- Strunz classification: 2.LB.30 (10 ed); 2/E.19-20 (8 ed)
- Dana classification: 02.15.01.01
- Crystal system: Monoclinic; Unknown space group

Identification
- Color: Greenish gray or bluish green
- Mohs scale hardness: 2.5-3
- Luster: Metallic
- Density: 6.44
- Pleochroism: Weak
- References: Breskovska, V. V.; Mozgova, N. N.; Bortnikov, N. S.; Gorshkov, A. I.; Tzepin, A. I. (1982), "Ardaite, a new lead-antimony chlorsulphosalt" (PDF), Mineral. Mag., 46 (340): 357–361, Bibcode:1982MinM...46..357B, doi:10.1180/minmag.1982.046.340.10, S2CID 128756669

Ardaite is a very rare sulfosalt mineral with chemical formula Pb_{19}Sb_{13}S_{35}Cl_{7} in the monoclinic crystal system, named after the Arda River, which passes through the type locality.

== Discovery and occurrence ==
It was discovered in 1978 and approved by the International Mineralogical Association in 1980. It was the second well-defined natural chlorosulfosalt, after dadsonite.

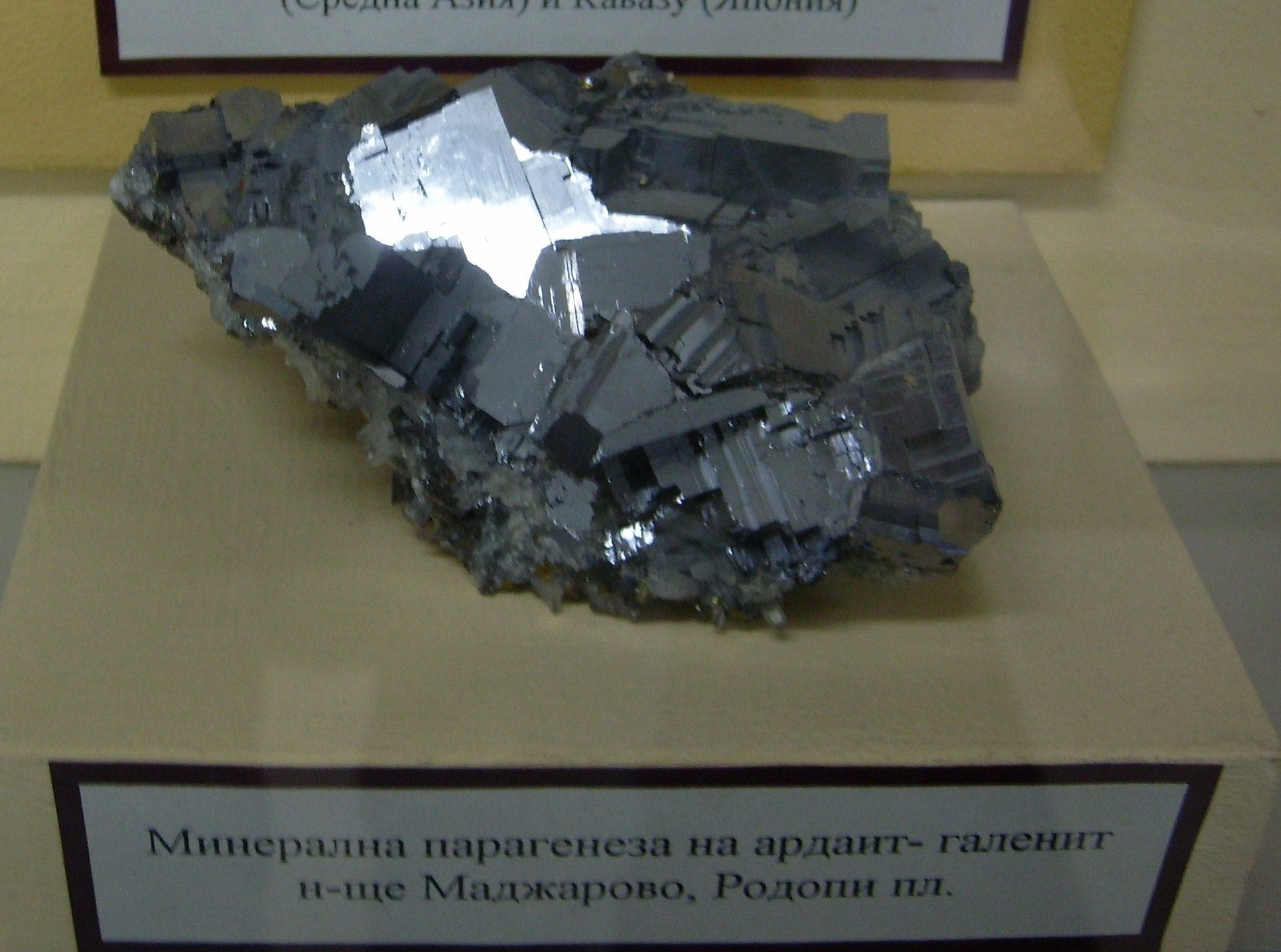
Paragenesis of ardaite and galena, Madjarovo ore deposit, Bulgaria, at the National Museum of Natural History, Bulgaria

Greenish gray or bluish green in color, its luster is metallic. Ardaite occurs as 50 μm fine-grained aggregates of acicular crystals associated with galena, pyrostilpnite, anglesite, nadorite, and chlorine-bearing robinsonite and semseyite, in the Madjarovo polymetallic ore deposit in Bulgaria. Ardaite has a hardness of 2.5 to 3 on Mohs scale and a density of approximately 6.44.

The type locality is the Madjarovo polymetallic ore deposit in the Rhodope Mountains. Later its occurrence was proved in the Gruvåsen deposit, near Filipstad, Bergslagen, Sweden.

== See also ==
List of minerals recognized by the International Mineralogical Association
