= Georgi Ivanov Terziev =

Bulgarian mineralogist

- Георги Иванов Терзиев
- Born: March 6, 1935; Gorichevo, Razgrad Province, Kingdom of Bulgaria
- Died: September 29, 1972 (aged 37); India
- Education: M.Sc., Geology – Moscow State University (1957); Ph.D. Bulgarian Academy of Sciences (1967)
- Known for: Contributions in the field of mineralogy kostovite hemusite
- Spouse: Tamara Hissina (m. 1957; died 1972)
- Children: one son
- Scientific career
- Fields: Geology, Mineralogy
- Workplaces: Bulgarian Academy of Sciences; Sofia_University_of_Mining_and_Geology; United Nations

Georgi Ivanov Terziev (Bulgarian: Георги Иванов Терзиев) (6 March 1935 – 29 September 1972) was a Bulgarian geologist and mineralogist. Georgi Terziev was an exceptional figure in the field of mineralogy and made major contributions to the study of the mining regions and deposits near Panagyurishte and Madan.

Terziev is credited for the discoveries of the minerals kostovite and hemusite.

He died, together with his wife and colleague Tamara Hissina, in a car accident at the age of 37.
