= Yordanka Mincheva-Stefanova =

Bulgarian mineralogist

Yordanka Hristova Mincheva - Stefanova
- Йорданка Христова Минчева - Стефанова
- Born: 29 August 1923; Stara Zagora; Kingdom of Bulgaria
- Died: 28 April 2007 (aged 83); Sofia; Republic of Bulgaria
- Education: M.Sc., Natural History – Sofia University (1946)
- Known for: Contributions in the field of mineralogy оf sulphides strashimirite
- Scientific career
- Fields: Geology; Mineralogy; Crystallography
- Workplaces: Bulgarian Academy of Sciences; Sofia University

Yordanka Hristova Mincheva - Stefanova (Bulgarian: Йорданка Христова Минчева - Стефанова) (29 August 1923 – 28 April 2007), Aka Jordanka Mincheva - Stefanova, Jordanka Minčeva - Stefanova, was a Bulgarian geologist, mineralogist and crystallographer. Her scientific interests were in sulphide mineralogy, crystal chemistry and genesis of minerals - sulphides, carbonates, arsenates, silicates etc.

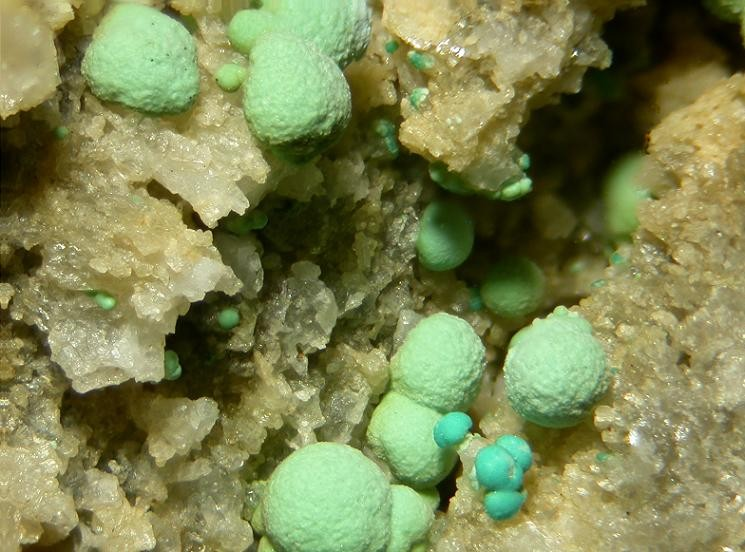
Strashimirite from Schwarzleo District, Schwarzleograben, Hütten, Leogang, Saalfelden, Salzburg, Austria

== Selected publications ==
- Kostov, Ivan; Minčeva-Stefanova, J. (1982). Sulphide Minerals: Crystal Chemistry, Paragenesis and Systematics. Stuttgart: Schweizerbartische Verlagsbuchhandlung. OCLC 9306473 – via Internet Archive.
- Kostov, Ivan; Minčeva-Stefanova, J.; Breskovska, V.; Kirov, G. (1964). The Minerals in Bulgaria (in Bulgarian). Sofia: Bulgarian Academy of Sciences. OCLC 30695814.
- Kostov, I.; J. Minčeva-Stefanova (2008). "Whewellite - a mineral new for Bulgaria" (PDF). Geochemistry, Mineralogy, Petrology (46): 31–34.
