= Baikushev's pine =

Ancient pine tree in Bulgaria

Coordinates: 41°46′01″N 23°25′23″E

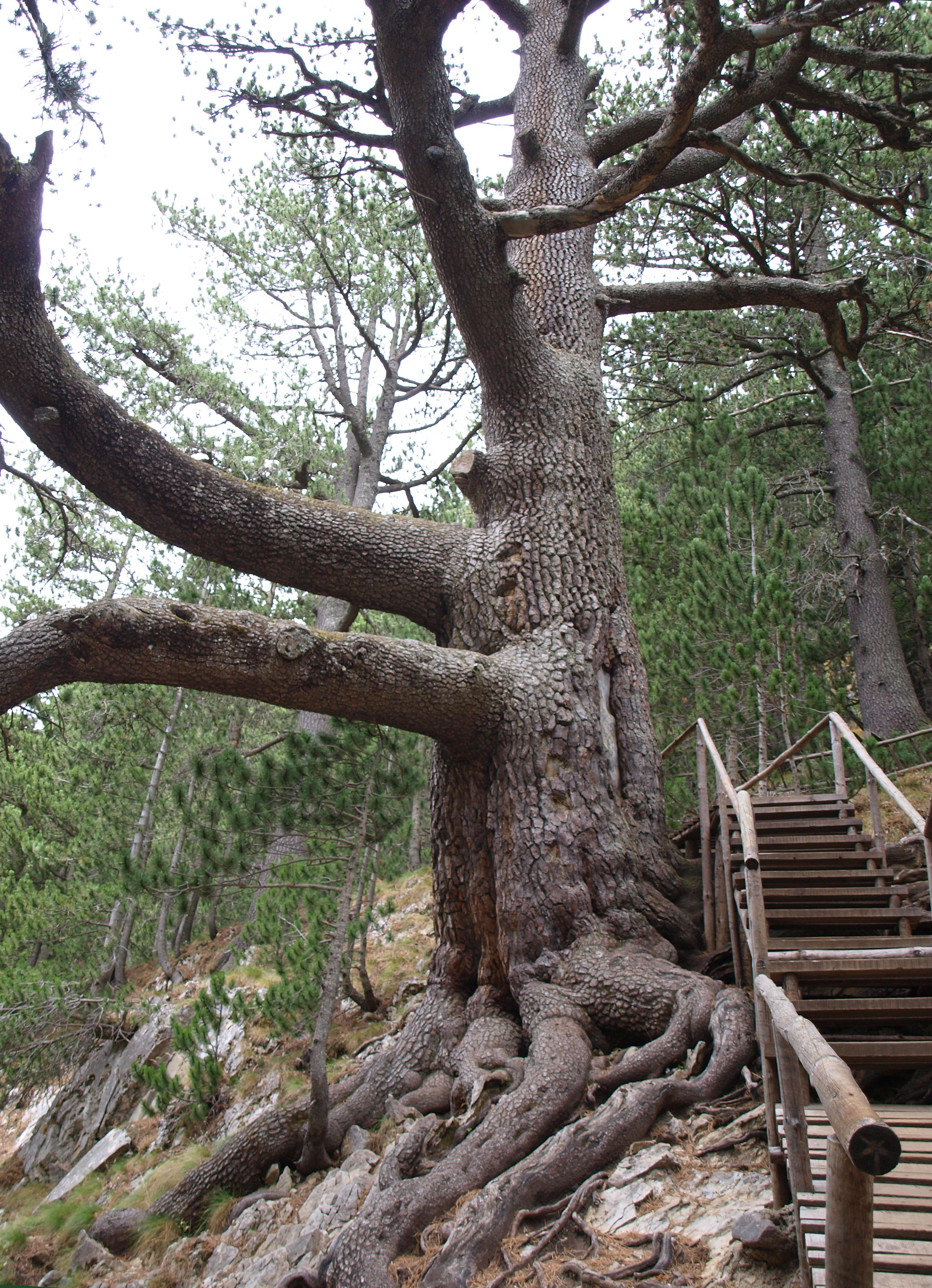
Baikushev's pine

Baikushev's pine (Bulgarian: Байкушевата мура) is a coniferous tree from the species Pinus heldreichii (Bosnian pine) situated in the Pirin mountains of southwestern Bulgaria. It is named after its discoverer, forest ranger Kostadin Baikushev, and is located near the Banderitsa refuge. With an estimated age of about 1,300 years, Baikushev's pine is one of the oldest trees in Europe and is arguably contemporary with Bulgaria's founder, Khan Asparukh. It has a height of 24 m (79 ft), is 2.22 m (7 ft 3 in) in diameter (7.8 m (26 ft) in circumference).

== See also ==
- Granit Oak
- List of oldest trees
- List of individual trees
