= Hemusite =

Very rare isometric gray mineral

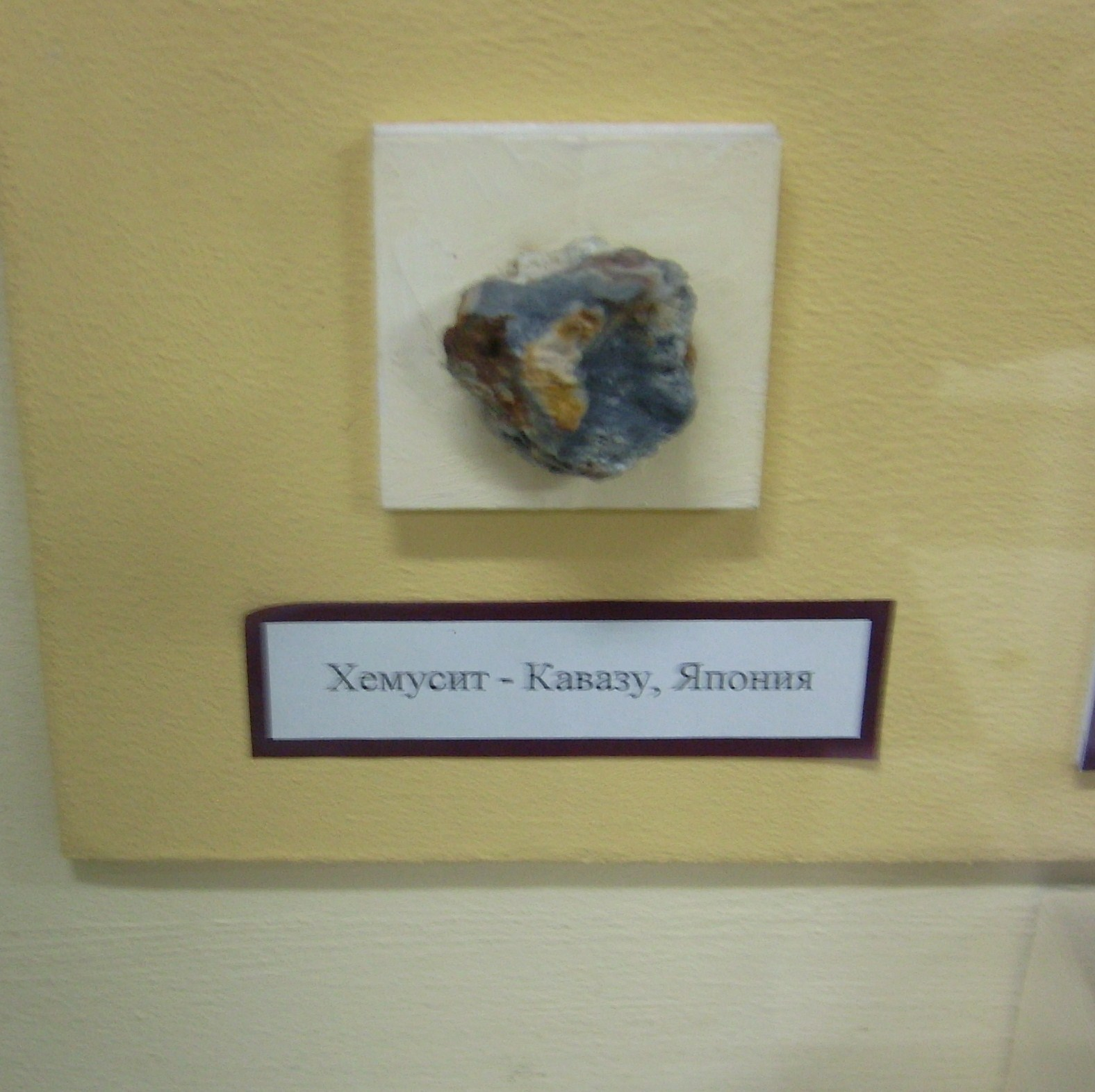
- Hemusite from Kawazu mine, Japan at The National Museum of Natural History, Bulgaria

General
- Category: Sulfosalt minerals, Sulfides
- Formula: Cu_{6}SnMoS_{8}
- IMA symbol: Hm
- Strunz classification: 2.CB.35a (10 ed); 2/C.09-10 (8 ed)
- Dana classification: 2.9.6.1
- Crystal system: Isometric
- Space group: P432 (no. 207), F4̅3m (no. 216), or Fm3̅m (no. 225)

Identification
- Color: gray
- Mohs scale hardness: 4
- Luster: metallic
- Diaphaneity: Opaque
- Density: 4.469

Hemusite (IMA symbol: Hm) is a very rare isometric gray mineral containing copper, molybdenum, sulfur, and tin with chemical formula Cu_{6}SnMoS_{8}.

== Discovery and occurrence ==
It was discovered by Bulgarian mineralogist Georgi Ivanov Terziev in 1963. He also described it and named it after Haemus, the ancient name of Stara planina (Balkan) mountains in Europe. The type locality is Chelopech copper ore deposit, Bulgaria. Later tiny deposits of hemusite were found in Ozernovskoe deposit, Kamchatka, Russia; Kawazu mine, Rendaiji, Shimoda city, Chūbu region, Honshu Island, Japan; Iriki mine, Iriki, Satsuma-gun, Kagoshima Prefecture, Kyushu Region, Japan; Kochbulak deposit, Tashkent, Uzbekistan. Hemusite occurs as rounded isometric grains and aggregates usually about 0.05 mm in diameter and in association with enargite, luzonite, colusite, stannoidite, renierite, tennantite, chalcopyrite, pyrite, and other minerals.

== See also ==
- List of minerals recognized by the International Mineralogical Association
