= Opan =

Opan Опан
- Location of Opan
- Coordinates: 42°13′N 25°42′E
- Country: Bulgaria
- Province (Oblast): Stara Zagora

Government
  - Mayor: Gencho Kolev
- Elevation: 142 m (466 ft)

Population (2017)
  - Total: ▼314
- Time zone: UTC+2 (EET)
  - Summer (DST): UTC+3 (EEST)
- Postal Code: 6078
- Area code: 04101

Opan (Bulgarian: Опан, pronounced [oˈpan]) is a village in southern Bulgaria, part of Stara Zagora Province. It is the administrative centre of Opan Municipality, which lies in the southern part of Stara Zagora Province. The village is located south of the provincial capital of Stara Zagora, in the Upper Thracian Plain, the historical region of Thrace. The village was first mentioned in an Ottoman tax register of 1655.

== Population ==
According to the 2011 census, village of Opan has a dwindling population of 385 people, down from its peak of 1,531 people in 1934. Most inhabitants are Bulgarians (97%), with a small Roma minority (3%). Orthodox Christianity is the main religion in the village of Opan.
