= Opan Municipality =

Coordinates: 42°13′N 25°42′E

Opan Municipality Община Опан
- Municipality
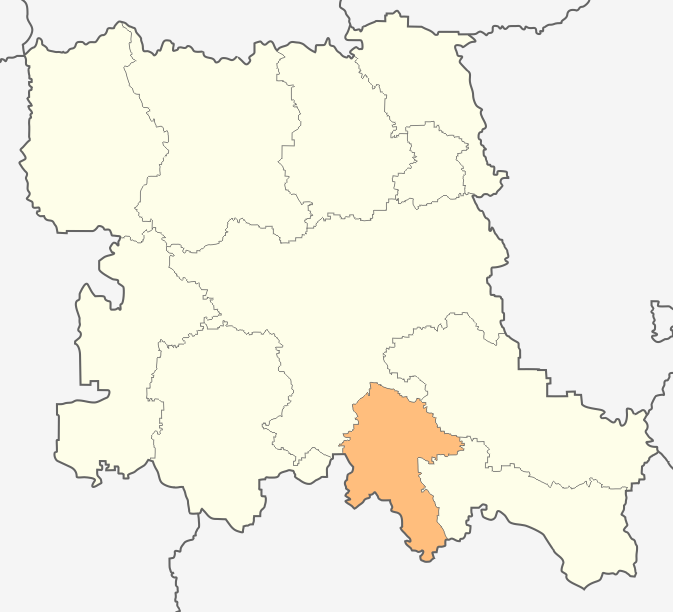
- Country: Bulgaria
- Province: Stara Zagora Province
- Seat: Opan

Population (2009)
  - Total: 3 358

Opan Municipality is located in Bulgaria. The administrative centre is in Opan. It has an area of 257.5 square kilometres, has 3 358 inhabitants and includes the following 13 places:

- Bashtino
- Byal Izvor
- Byalo Pole
- Knyazhevsko
- Kravino
- Opan
- Pastren
- Sredets
- Stoletovo
- Trakiya
- Vasil Levski
- Venets
- Yastrebovo

== Demography ==
=== Religion ===
According to the latest Bulgarian census of 2011, the religious composition, among those who answered the optional question on religious identification, was the following:

Religious composition of Opan Municipality
| Orthodox Christianity | 90.1% |
| Catholicism | 0.0% |
| Protestantism | 0.8% |
| Islam | 0.6% |
| No religion | 3.6% |
| Prefer not to answer, others and indefinable | 4.9% |
