= Vídeň =

- Municipality
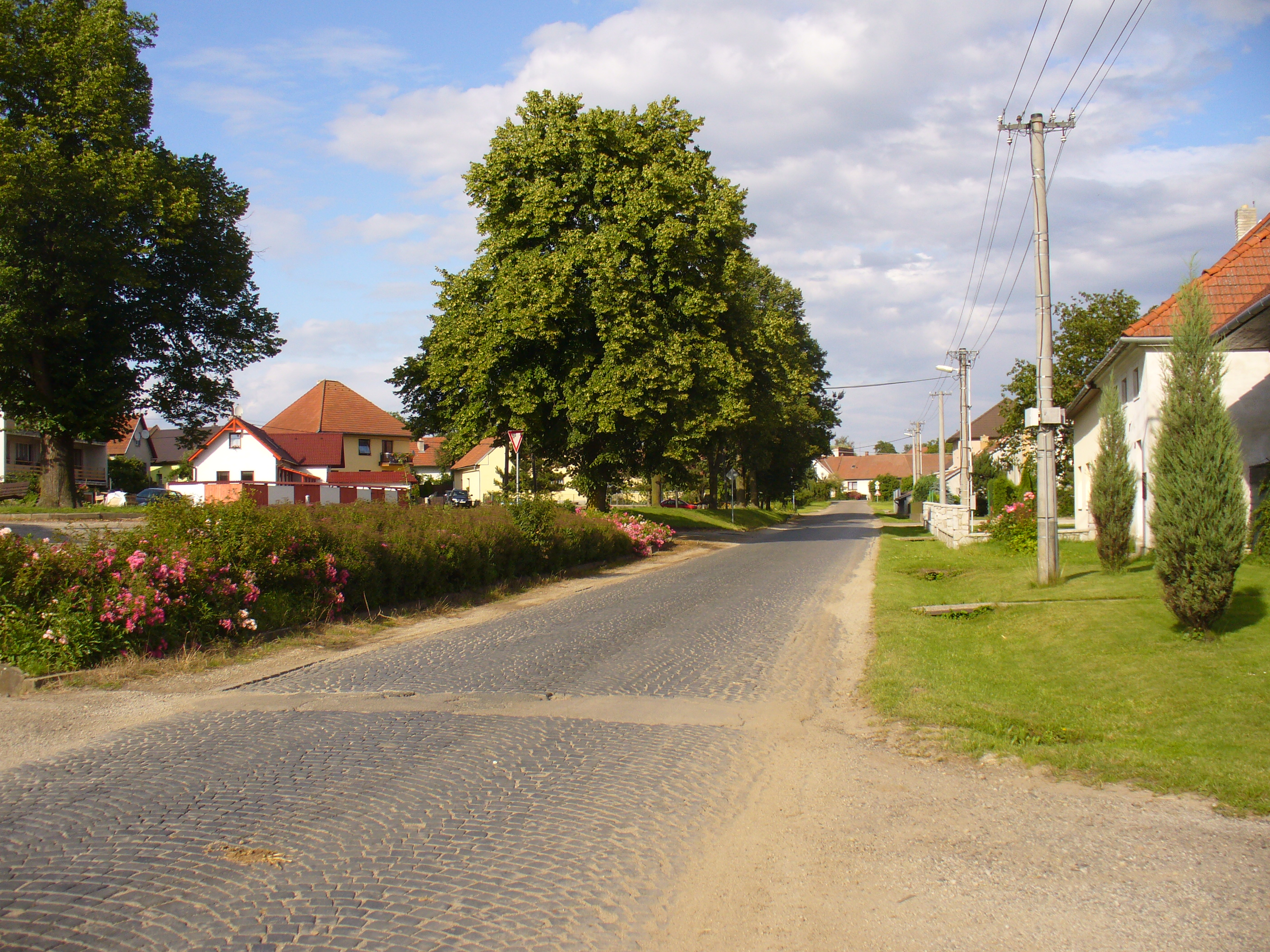
- A street in Vídeň

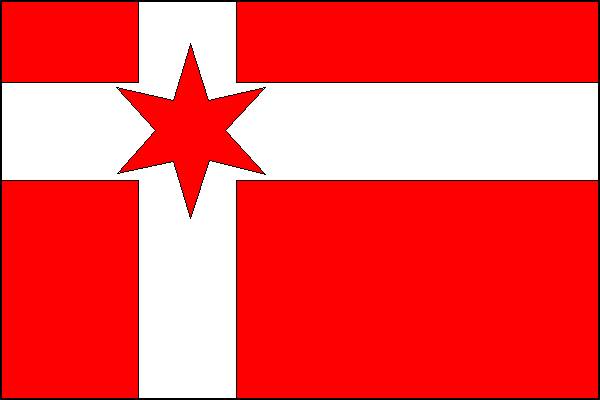
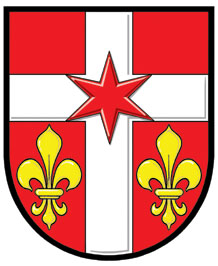
- Flag Coat of arms

- Location in the Czech Republic
- Coordinates: 49°23′32″N 16°1′54″E
- Country: Czech Republic
- Region: Vysočina
- District: Žďár nad Sázavou
- First mentioned: 1370

Area
  - Total: 7.84 km^{2} (3.03 sq mi)
- Elevation: 514 m (1,686 ft)

Population (2026-01-01)
  - Total: 469
  - Density: 59.8/km^{2} (155/sq mi)
- Time zone: UTC+1 (CET)
  - Summer (DST): UTC+2 (CEST)
- Postal code: 594 01
- Website: www.obecviden.cz

Vídeň is a municipality and village in Žďár nad Sázavou District in the Vysočina Region of the Czech Republic. It has about 500 inhabitants.

Vídeň lies approximately 20 kilometres (12 mi) south of Žďár nad Sázavou, 32 km (20 mi) east of Jihlava, and 139 km (86 mi) south-east of Prague.

== History ==
The first written mention of Vídeň is from 1370.

== Demographics ==
Historical population
Year	Pop.	±%
1869	441	—
1880	400	−9.3%
1890	404	+1.0%
1900	408	+1.0%
1910	426	+4.4%
1921	437	+2.6%
1930	443	+1.4%
1950	376	−15.1%
1961	366	−2.7%
1970	380	+3.8%
1980	409	+7.6%
1991	355	−13.2%
2001	374	+5.4%
2011	434	+16.0%
2021	454	+4.6%
Source: Censuses
