= Galabovo =

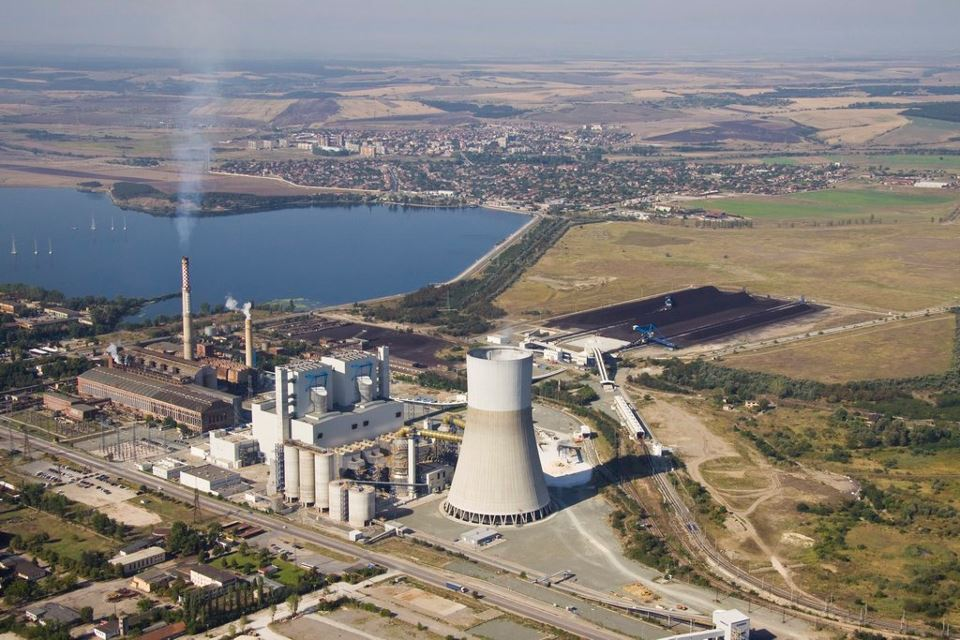
- Galabovo

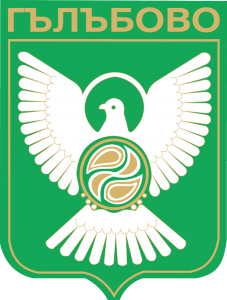
- Coat of arms

- Location of Galabovo
- Coordinates: 42°8′N 25°51′E
- Country: Bulgaria
- Province (Oblast): Stara Zagora

Government
  - Mayor: Nikolay Tonev
- Elevation: 83 m (272 ft)

Population (2009-12-31)
  - Total: 8,404
- Time zone: UTC+2 (EET)
  - Summer (DST): UTC+3 (EEST)
- Postal Code: 6280
- Area code: 0418

Galabovo (Bulgarian: Гълъбово Bulgarian pronunciation: [ˈɡɤɫɐbovo], from гълъб galab, "dove" + -ovo) is a town in south-central Bulgaria, part of Stara Zagora Province. It is the administrative centre of the homonymous Galabovo Municipality. As of December 2022, the town had a population of 6,845.

Galabovo is located in the southeastern part of the Upper Thracian Plain, in a region economically important due to the extraction of coal and production of electricity in the region. The Maritsa Iztok-1 power plant is situated nearby. The population is predominantly Bulgarian and Bulgarian Orthodox, the employment is pretty high, with the residents employed for the most part in the coal, compressed slacks and electricity industry.

== Municipality ==
Galabovo is also the seat of Galabovo municipality (part of Stara Zagora Province), which in addition to the town also includes the following 10 villages:

- Aprilovo
- Glavan
- Iskritsa
- Madrets
- Mednikarovo
- Musachevo
- Obruchishte
- Pomoshtnik
- Razdelna
- Velikovo
