= EET =

EET or eet may refer to:

- EET (library), a software library
- Eet (symbol) (⊥), a mathematical symbol
- "Eet" (song), a song from Regina Spektor's album Far
- Eastern European Time, (UTC+2)
- EE Technologies, an American electronics manufacturing company
- EE Times, an electronics industry magazine
- Electrical engineering technology
- Electronic energy transfer
- Epoxyeicosatrienoic acid
- Extra element theorem
- School of Engineering of Terrassa (Catalan: Escola d'Enginyeria de Terrassa), in Spain
- Shelby County Airport (Alabama)
- KEET, PBS member television station in Eureka, California
- EET, expected execution time (in Information technology and System Operation)
