= Granit, Bulgaria =

Granit Гранит
- Location of Granit
- Coordinates: 42.250°N 25.140°E
- Country: Bulgaria
- Provinces (Oblast): Stara Zagora
- Elevation: 171 m (561 ft)

Population (December 2017)
  - Total: ▼665
- Time zone: UTC+2 (EET)
  - Summer (DST): UTC+3 (EEST)
- Postal Code: 6252
- Area code: 041331

Granit (in Bulgarian: Гранит) is a village in southern Bulgaria, Bratya Daskalovi municipality, Stara Zagora Province. The village is famous for the oldest tree in Bulgaria and one of the most ancient in the world, the Granit Oak (Quercus robur), estimated to be about 1,700 years old. It was formed in 1945 upon the merger of two villages, Golobradovo and Skobelovo. In 1989 its population was 1103, while this number declined to 665 in December 2017.

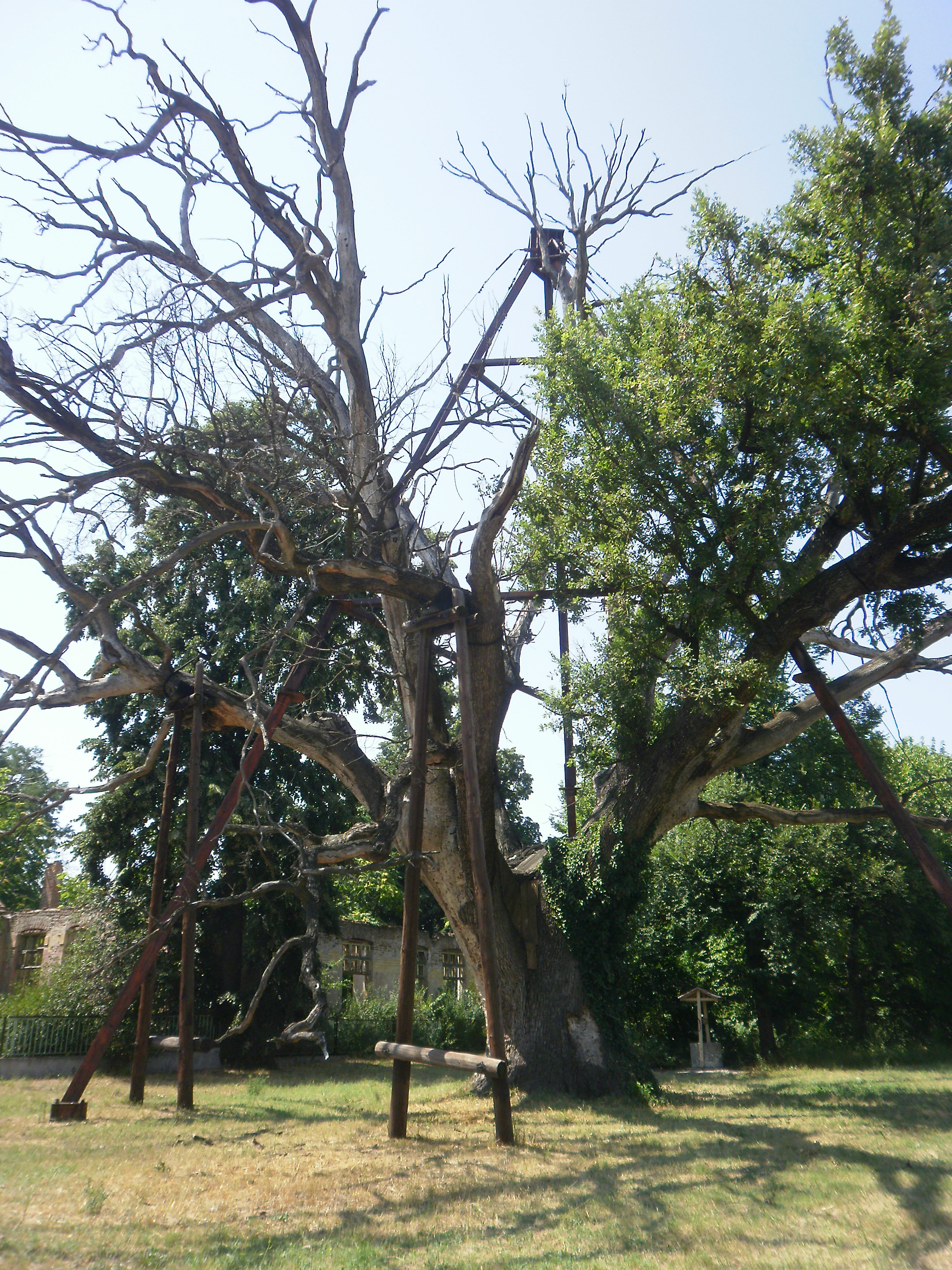
The Granit oak is considered to be the oldest tree in Bulgaria.

== Population ==
As of December 2017, the village of Granit has a dwindling population of 665 people. Bulgarians (54%) and Romani people (45%) make up the largest ethnic groups.
