= Maritsa Iztok Complex =

Coal power plant

Maritsa Iztok-1 (TPS AES Galabovo)
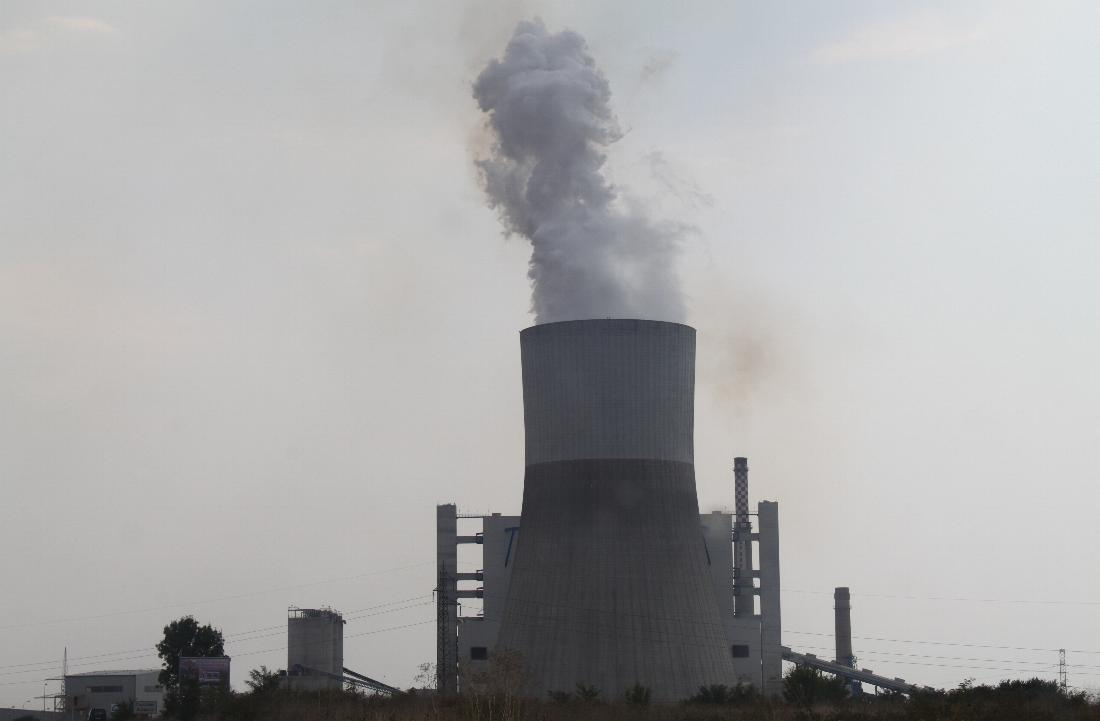
- TPS AES Galabovo
- Country: Bulgaria
- Location: Galabovo
- Coordinates: 42°9′16″N 25°54′41″E
- Status: Operational
- Construction began: June 2006
- Commission date: 3 June 2011
- Owner: AES Corporation

Thermal power station
- Primary fuel: Lignite

Power generation
- Units operational: 2 X 335 MW
- Make and model: Alstom
- Nameplate capacity: 670 MW

External links
- Commons: Related media on Commons

Maritsa Iztok-2
- Country: Bulgaria
- Location: Radetski village
- Coordinates: 42°15′14″N 26°7′55″E
- Status: Operational
- Construction began: 7 May 1962
- Commission date: 10 November 1966
- Owner: Bulgarian Energy Holding EAD
- Operator: Maritsa East-2 TPP

Thermal power station
- Primary fuel: Lignite

Power generation
- Units operational: 4 X 150 MW; 2 X 210 MW; 2 X 215 MW
- Make and model: LMZ; Electrosila
- Nameplate capacity: 1,465 MW

External links
- Commons: Related media on Commons

Maritsa Iztok-3
- Country: Bulgaria
- Location: Bulgaria
- Coordinates: 42°8′40″N 26°0′12″E
- Status: Operational
- Construction began: 1978
- Commission date: 1980
- Operator: Energiina Kompaniya Maritsa Iztok 3 AD

Thermal power station
- Primary fuel: Lignite

Power generation
- Units operational: 4 X 225 MW
- Make and model: LMZ
- Nameplate capacity: 900 MW

External links
- Commons: Related media on Commons

The Maritsa Iztok Complex generates coal power in Bulgaria. Maritsa Iztok 1 and 3 located entirely within Stara Zagora Province in south-central Bulgaria while Maritsa Iztok 2 is split with eastern neighboring Sliven Province. It consists of three lignite-fired thermal power stations. The complex is located in a large lignite coal basin, which includes several mines, enrichment plants, a briquette plant and its own railway system. The development of the thermal power and mining complex at Maritsa Iztok began in 1952, but the lignite deposits used to be known well in the mid-19th century. The Maritsa Iztok mines and power plants are interdependent as the only market for coal is the power plants, while the power plants have no other supplier of coal but the mines.

The complex is the largest source of CO_{2} emissions in Bulgaria with over 10 million tons in 2024. The complex is politically controversial; it has badly polluted local towns but many people rely on it for jobs.

== Maritsa Iztok-1 (TPS AES Galabovo) ==
Maritsa Iztok-1 is located near Galabovo. In October 1998, the old power plant with a capacity of 500 megawatts (MW) was privatized and sold to Consolidated Continental Commerce (3C), later purchased by AES Corporation. On 15 February 2000, AES and the Bulgarian grid operator Natzionalna Elektricheska Kompania EAD (NEK) signed a 15-year tolling agreement, according to which AES has an obligation to replace the old power station with a new facility. In June 2006, AES started construction of the new 670 MW power station. It became operational on 3 June 2011. The new power station consists of two pulverised coal boilers of 335 MW each, two steam turbines, two generators and desulphurisation facilities. The plant was constructed by Alstom. It cost €1.2 billion.

== Maritsa Iztok-2 ==
Maritsa Iztok-2 is the largest thermal power plant in the Balkans. It is located 60 kilometres (37 mi) from Stara Zagora in the vicinity of the village of Radetski and the dam lake Ovcharitsa. The construction of Maritsa Iztok-2 started on 7 May 1962; it was inaugurated on 10 November 1966. Between 1979 and 1995 the power station was expanded by four additional units. 1977 and 1980 two new 325 metres (1,066 ft) tall chimneys were built. Maritsa Iztok-2 has a total installed capacity of 1,465 MW and generates 30% of Bulgaria's electricity. It consists of eight generating units, two of which are equipped with flue gas desulphurization plants. The rehabilitation of the older power units, including construction of FGD plants for units 1 to 6, are in progress.

Maritsa Iztok-2 is wholly state-owned. It is a subsidiary of Bulgarian Energy Holding EAD.

In November 2014 the power station was ranked as the industrial facility that is causing the highest damage costs to health and the environment in Bulgaria and the entire European Union by the European Environment Agency.

In June 2019 a fire thought to be caused by routine maintenance broke out on the smokestack of the flue gas desulphurisation system at Unit 8.

== Maritsa Iztok-3 ==
Maritsa Iztok-3 is Bulgaria's third-largest power plant. It is located 40 kilometres (25 mi) from Stara Zagora. The power plant has an installed capacity of 900 MW, which is produced by four units of each 225 MW. It has a 325 metres (1,066 ft) tall chimney.

In 1998, the United States power utility Entergy Corporation purchased 73% of Maritsa Iztok-3 shares for US$375 million from the Bulgarian state. Entergy also has the obligation to modernize the power station. In 2002, the Italian power company Enel joined the project; in 2006 Enel acquired Entergy's stake. At present, Maritsa Iztok-3 is owned and operated by Energiina Kompaniya Maritsa Iztok 3 AD, a joint venture of ContourGlobal (73%) and NEK (27%).

== See also ==
- Bobov Dol Power Plant
