= Bratya Daskalovi =

Bratya Daskalovi Братя Даскалови
- Location of Bratya Daskalovi
- Coordinates: 42°17′43.83″N 25°12′31.76″E
- Country: Bulgaria
- Provinces (Oblast): Stara Zagora

Government
  - Mayor: Vanya Stoeva
- Elevation: 671 m (2,201 ft)

Population (December 2009)
  - Total: 750
- Time zone: UTC+2 (EET)
  - Summer (DST): UTC+3 (EEST)
- Postal Code: 6250
- Area code: 04134

Bratya Daskalovi (Bulgarian: Братя Даскалови, pronounced [ˈbratʲɐ dɐskɐˈɫɔvi]; also transliterated Bratja Daskalovi or Bratia Daskalovi) is a village in southern Bulgaria, part of Stara Zagora Province with a population of 750 inhabitants as of December 2009. It is the administrative centre of the homonymous Bratya Daskalovi Municipality, which lies in the western part of Stara Zagora Province. It is located in the Upper Thracian Plain, the historical region of Thrace.

The village was administratively formed in 1956 through the merger of the villages of Grozdovo (until 1906 Burnusus, 1906-1947 Malko Borisovo) and Voynitsite (until 1906 Voynik Mahle), on the opposite banks of the Omurovo River. Its name means "Daskalovi Brothers" and it was named after the brothers Dimitar, Ivan and Nikola, participants in the September Uprising who were executed by firing squad by the authorities on 4 October 1923.

== Population ==
As of December 2017, the village of Bratya Daskalovi has a dwindling population of 579 people. Nearly all inhabitants are ethnic Bulgarians (97%), with a few Romani people. Most inhabitants belong to the Bulgarian Orthodox Church.

== Geography ==
The Bratya Daskalovi municipality lies in a typical rural area with 63% landmass resource eligible for agricultural development. This fact makes agriculture the main sector driving the local economy.

Popular crops among villages in Bratya Daskalovi are vineyards, lavender plantations, rose plantations, orchards, and cherries.

The soil and climatic conditions are suitable for the cultivation of lavender, cotton, and oil-bearing roses.

== Municipality ==
Bratya Daskalovi municipality covers an area of 497 square kilometres and includes the following 23 places:

- Bratya Daskalovi
- Cherna Gora
- Dolno Novo Selo
- Golyam Dol
- Gorno Belevo
- Gorno Novo Selo
- Granit
- Kolyu Marinovo
- Malak Dol
- Malko Dryanovo
- Markovo
- Medovo
- Mirovo
- Naydenovo
- Opalchenets
- Orizovo
- Partizanin
- Plodovitovo
- Pravoslav
- Saedinenie
- Sarnevets
- Slavyanin
- Veren
