= Russian Mineralogical Society =

- Abbreviation: RMS
- Formation: June 24, 1817; 208 years ago
- Type: Scientific society
- Purpose: Promoting the development of fundamental and applied areas of Earth sciences and Mineralogy in Russia
- Headquarters: Saint Petersburg, Russia
- Coordinates: 59°55′48″N 30°16′08″E
- Leader: Sergei Krivovichev,
- Main organ: Zapiski RMO (Proceedings of the Russian Mineralogical Society)
- Affiliations: International Mineralogical Association
- Website: www.minsoc.ru (in Russian)

The Russian Mineralogical Society (RMS) is a public scientific organization uniting specialists and scientific groups working in the field of mineralogy and adjacent sciences. RMS was founded in 1817 Saint Petersburg, Russia, and is the world oldest mineralogical society among present. From 1869 until nowadays its residence is the Saint Petersburg Mining Institute.

RMS represents the Russian Federation with regard to the science of mineralogy in any international context. RMS is a member and one of the establishers (Madrid, 8 April 1958) of the International Mineralogical Association.

== Publications ==
- Proceedings of the Russian Mineralogical Society, is the print journal of the society, and it has been published continuously since 1830. It publishes scientific articles on mineralogy, petrology, deposits study, crystallography and geochemistry, and also articles on science history, critical and discussional announcements are published in the journal. In the part «Chronicles» information about the results of work of congresses, conferences and symposiums in the field of these sciences is given, and in the part «Bibliography» new monographs, reference books and text-books on mineralogy and adjacent disciplines are discussed.

== Special Interest Commissions and Working Groups (WG) ==
- History,
- Cosmic Mineralogy,
- Crystal Genesis,
- Mineralogy of Gemstone Deposits and Gemology,
- Museums,
- New Minerals and Mineral Names,
- Organic Mineralogy,
- High School Teaching in Mineralogy,
- Crystal Chemistry and X-ray Diffraction of Minerals,
- Ore Mineralogy,
- Mineral Processing,
- Physical Methods of Investigation of Minerals,
- Environmental Mineralogy and Geochemistry,
- Experimental Mineralogy, and
- WG on Modern Mineral-Bearing Processes.

== Awards ==
- Diploma,
- Honorary Certificate,
- Honorary Testimonial,
- Status of an Honorary Member.

== Membership ==
Membership in the society is open to any person interested in mineralogy and related sciences regardless of residence or citizenship.

== Annual meeting ==
The RMS organizes general meetings every 4 years and also annual scientific sessions.
