= Stara Zagora Province =

Province in south-central Bulgaria

Coordinates: 42°25′N 25°30′E

Stara Zagora Province Област Стара Загора
- Province
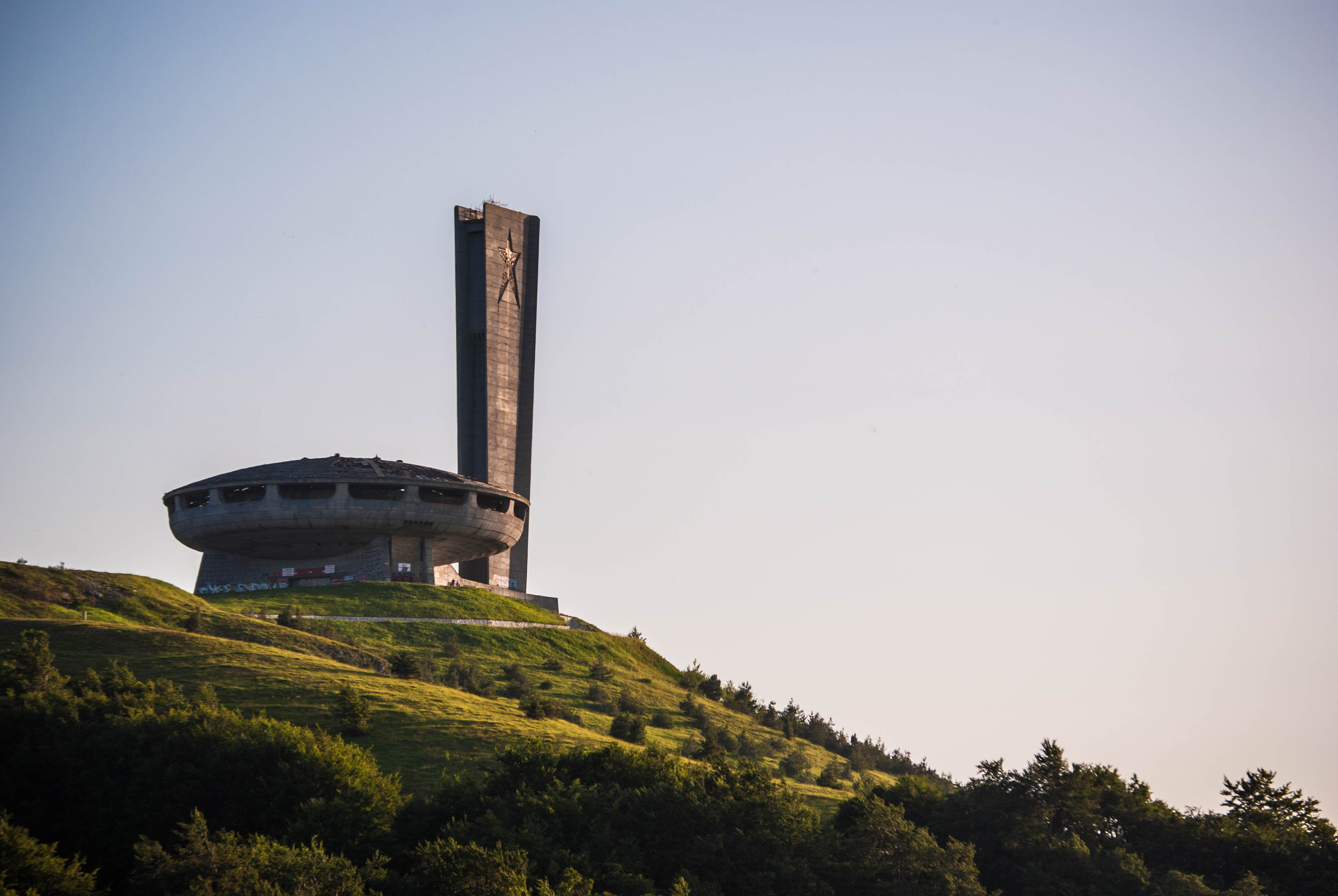
- Buzludzha Monument

- Flag

- Location of Stara Zagora Province in Bulgaria
- Country: Bulgaria
- Capital: Stara Zagora
- Municipalities: 11

Government
  - Governor: Gergana Mikova

Area
  - Total: 5,151.5 km^{2} (1,989.0 sq mi)

Population (December 2025)
  - Total: 286,722
  - Density: 55.658/km^{2} (144.15/sq mi)
- Time zone: UTC+2 (EET)
  - Summer (DST): UTC+3 (EEST)
- Postal codes: 6000–6014
- Area code: (+359) 42
- License plate: CT
- Website: sz.government.bg

Stara Zagora (Bulgarian: Област Стара Загора), formerly known as the Stara Zagora okrug, is a province of south-central Bulgaria. It is named after its administrative and industrial centre—the city of Stara Zagora—the sixth-biggest town in the country. The province embraces a territory of 5,151.1 km^{2} (1,988.9 sq mi) that is divided into 11 municipalities with a total population, as of December 2009, of 350,925 inhabitants.

In the southeastern part of the province on the edge of Radnevo Municipality there is a coal production facility. Between 1934 and 1949, the province included parts of the present Kardzhali Province.

== Municipalities ==
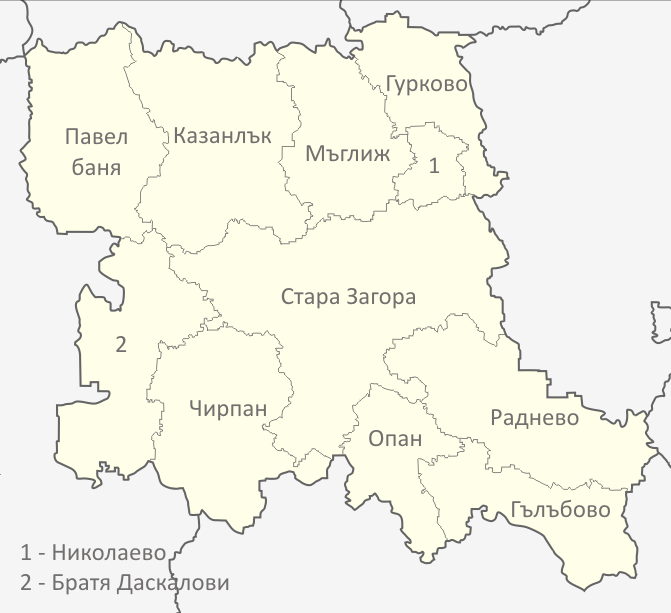
Map of Stara Zagora Province

The Stara Zagora province (област, oblast) contains 11 municipalities (Bulgarian: община, romanized: obshtina - plural: общини, obshtini). The following table shows the names of each municipality in English and Cyrillic, the main town or village (towns are shown in bold), and the population of each as of December 2009.

Municipality	Cyrillic	Pop.	Town/Village	Pop.
Bratya	Братя Даскалови	9,724	Bratya Daskalovi	750
Chirpan	Чирпан	23,470	**Chirpan**	16,355
Gurkovo	Гурково	5,273	**Gurkovo**	2,917
Galabovo	Гълъбово	14,269	**Galabovo**	8,404
Kazanlak	Казанлък	76,447	**Kazanlak**	49,506
Maglizh	Мъглиж	12,267	**Maglizh**	3,426
Nikolaevo	Николаево	4,840	**Nikolaevo**	2,872
Opan	Опан	3,501	Opan	466
Pavel Banya	Павел баня	14,703	**Pavel Banya**	2,918
Radnevo	Раднево	21,959	**Radnevo**	13,384
Stara Zagora	Стара Загора	164,472	**Stara Zagora**	140,456

== Demographics ==
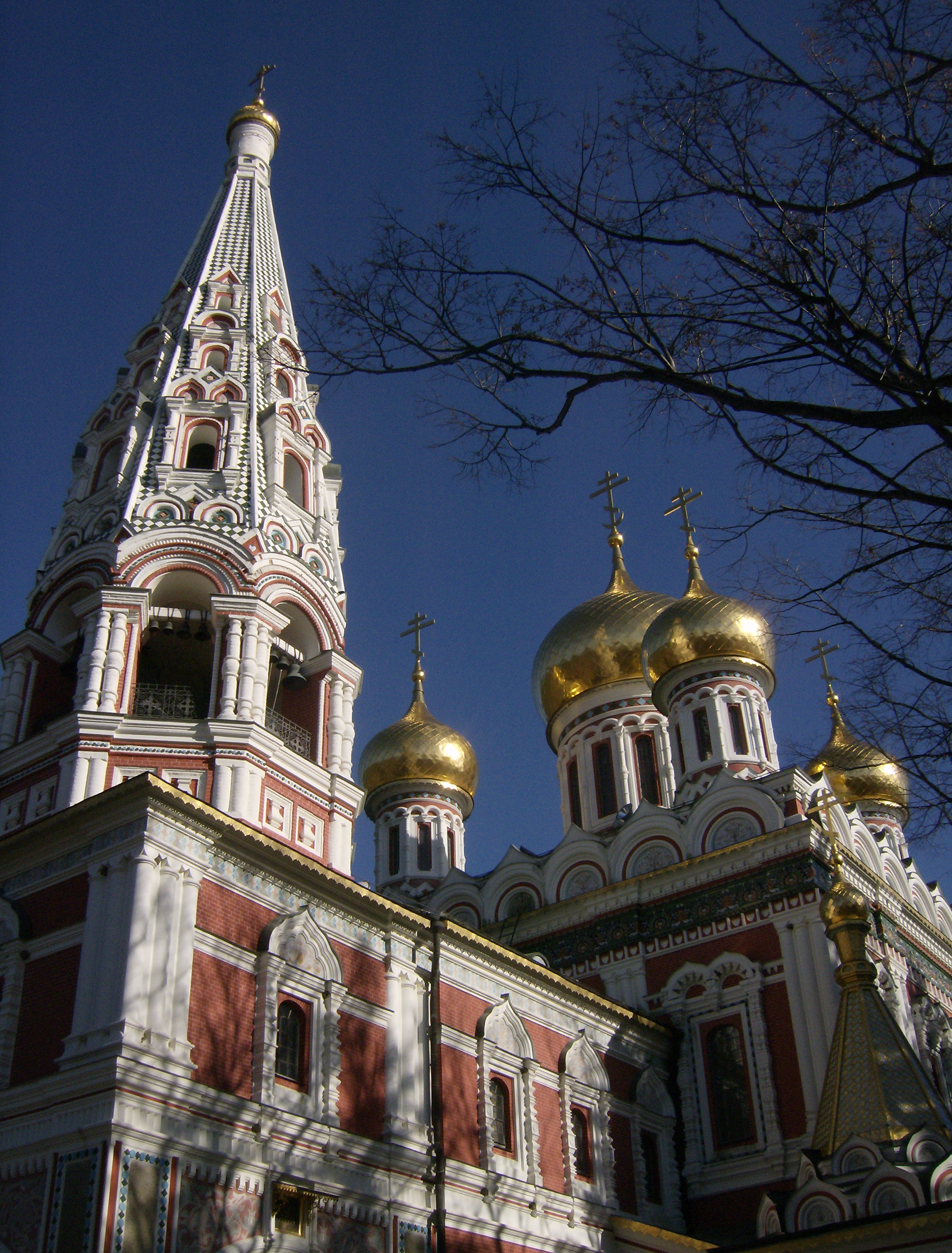
Shipka Memorial Church

Historical population
Year	Pop.	±%
1946	306,181	—
1956	322,252	+5.2%
1965	359,486	+11.6%
1975	394,607	+9.8%
1985	410,905	+4.1%
1992	397,339	−3.3%
2001	370,615	−6.7%
2011	333,265	−10.1%
2021	296,507	−11.0%
Source: pop-stat.mashke.org

The Stara Zagora province had a population of 370,665 (370,615 also given) according to a 2001 census, of which 48.9% were male and 51.1% were female.

As of the end of 2009, the population of the province, announced by the Bulgarian National Statistical Institute, numbered 350,925 of which 25.2% are inhabitants aged over 60 years.

=== Ethnic groups ===
Ethnic groups in Stara Zagora Province Province (2011 census)
Ethnic group	Percentage
Bulgarians	86.2%
Romani	7.8%
Turks	4.9%
others and indefinable	1.1%

According to the most recent 2011 census, out of the 333,265 people, 308,106 identified themselves:

- Bulgarians: 265,618 (86.21%)
- Romani: 24,018 (7.80%)
- Turks in Bulgaria: 15,035 (4.88%)
- Others and indefinable: 3,435 (1.11%)

A further 25,000 persons in the Province did not declare their ethnic group at the 2011 census.

Ethnic groups according to the 2001 census, when 370,615 people of the population of 370,665 of Stara Zagora Province identified themselves (with percentage of total population):

- Bulgarians: 319,379 (86.18%)
- Romani: 26,804 (7.23%)
- Turks: 18,529 (5.00%)
- Others: 5,903 (1.59%)

=== Religion ===
Religions in Stara Zagora Province (2011 census)
Religious group	Percentage
Orthodox Christians	63.14%
Muslim	3.5%
Protestant Christian	1.64%
Roman Catholic Christian	0.3%
others and indefinable	31.38%

Religious adherence in the province according to 2001 census:

Census 2001
religious adherence	population	%
Orthodox Christians	329,628	88.94%
Muslims	21,423	5.78%
Protestants	4,094	1.10%
Catholics	522	0.14%
Other	1558	0.42%
Religion not mentioned	13,390	3.62%
Total	370,615	100%

== Main city ==
Stara Zagora is a cultural centre of particular significance for Bulgaria as it is an ancient Thracian, subsequently Greek, Roman and Byzantine metropolis. The oldest Neolithic remains were found in Stara Zagora. The famous film of BBC The History of Europe starts with the Neolithic museum in Stara Zagora. It shows the remains of the first homes of the people in Europe. Stara Zagora is one of the oldest cities in Europe.

In October 2004, Stara Zagora Province was awarded for having the best quality of life in Europe, together with Greater Zürich (Switzerland), and ahead of Andalucia (Spain), and Flanders (Belgium). The award was given by fDi Magazine, produced by the renowned Financial Times Group, for the region's low-cost, newly built accommodation and rich cultural heritage.

In November 2014 the Maritsa Iztok-2 power station located in the East of Stara Zgora Province was ranked as the industrial facility that is causing the highest damage costs to health and the environment in Bulgaria and the entire European Union by the European Environment Agency.

== See also ==
- Provinces of Bulgaria
- List of villages in Stara Zagora Province
