= Tomb of Seuthes III =

Tomb in Bulgaria

Coordinates: 42°41′59.634″N 25°20′0.32″E

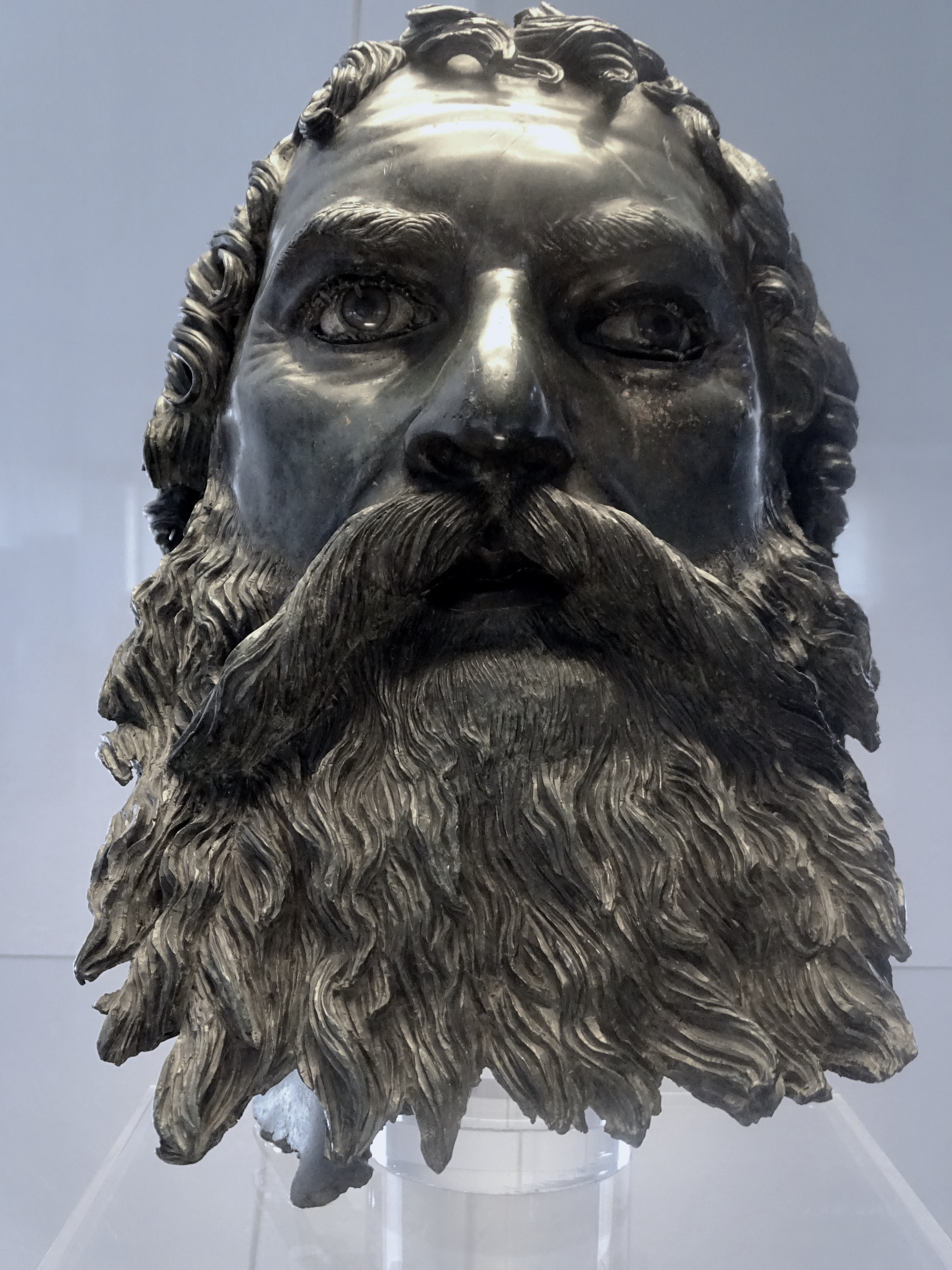
Bronze Head of Seuthes III, sculpted by Silanion or one of his circle of sculptors

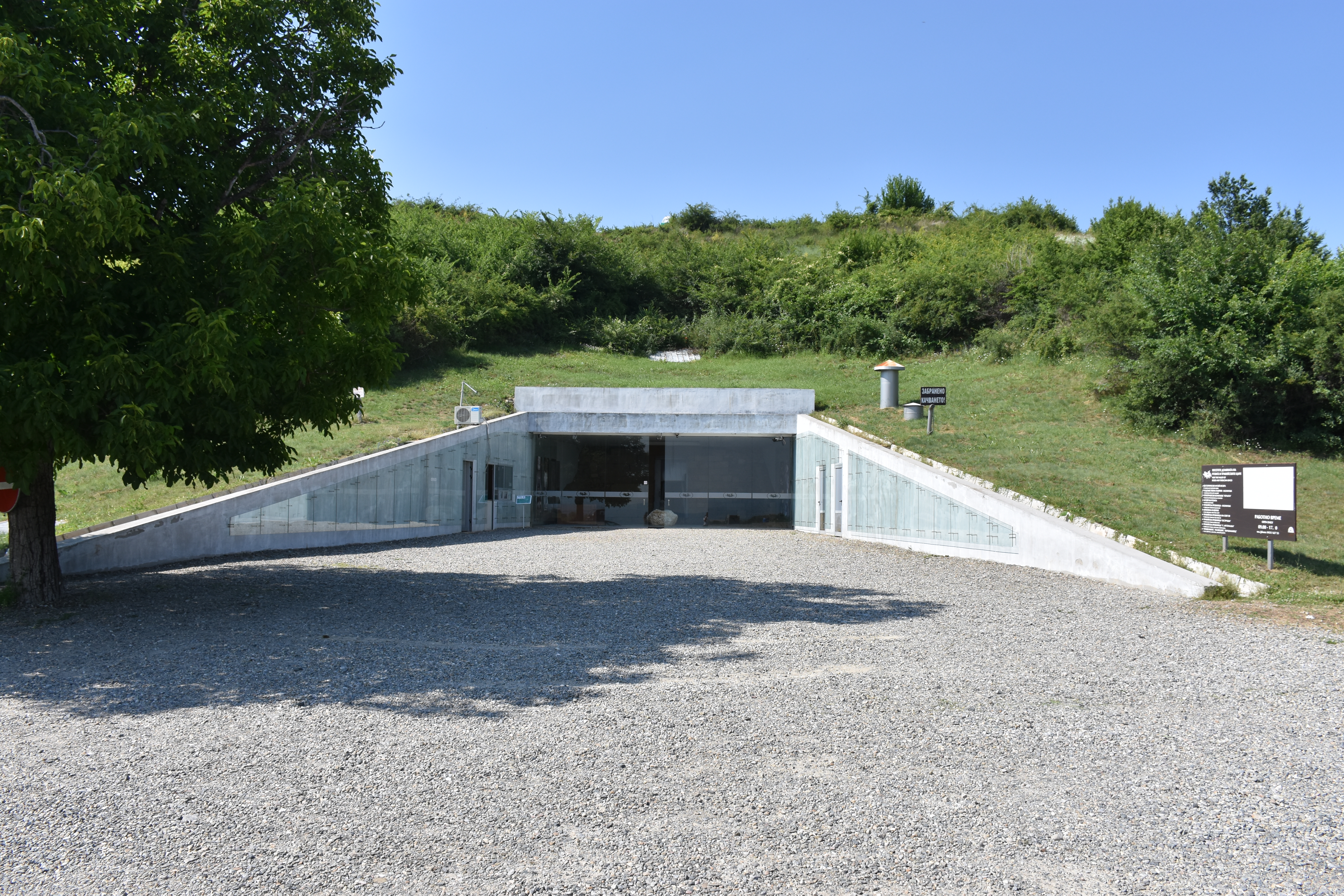
Tomb of Seuthes III

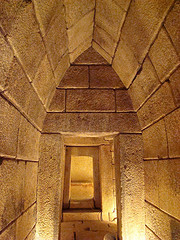
Interior

The Tomb of Seuthes III is located near Kazanlak, Bulgaria. Seuthes III was the King of the Odrysian Kingdom of Thrace from c. 331 to c. 300 BC and founder of the nearby Thracian city of Seuthopolis.

It is one of the most elaborate tombs in the Valley of the Thracian Rulers.

== Design ==
The tomb has an impressive façade, an unusual 13 metres (43 ft) long entry corridor and three consecutive spacious rooms. The first room is rectangular and has a rainbow-shaped, double-pitched roof. A horse had been sacrificed in this chamber. The next room is circular and domed, while the third room is carved in a huge stone block and has double-pitched covering (resembling a sarcophagus). Inside, there is a modeled funeral bed.

It is among the largest mounds in Thrace, with a maximum height of 23 metres (75 ft) and a diameter of 130 metres (430 ft). The tomb is built in a pre-accumulated mound embankment. A wide alley leads to the façade and entrance.

Also found was the now famous magnificent sculpted head believed to represent Seuthes III. The eyes are made of alabaster and glass paste and the eyelashes and eyebrows from copper strips.

== History and use ==
The tomb was originally a monumental temple at Golyama Kosmatka Mound, built in the second half of the 5th century BC. After extended use as a temple, around 300 BC, Seuthes lll was buried inside. The sarcophagus-chamber contained personal belongings that were necessary for the afterlife of the King. It includes knee pads, a gilded helmet with images, leather armour with a collar (plastron made of golden threads), a large sword and spears. There are bronze vessels, and three big ceramic amphora which were filled with thick Thracian wine. The floor and the ritual bed are covered by a carpet woven in gold thread. The total weight of the gold including all the objects is more than one kilogram. There are thirteen gold appliques for horse halters with images of human, animals and plants - objects which are rare in Thracian archaeology. Another two rectangular objects are golden with figures of standing warriors, used as a decoration for the sword sheath. There is a massive circular decoration for the King's armour. The handle of the rod is also golden. In the grave are placed golden vessels with two handles for drinking wine, also called kiliks, and a remarkable golden wreath with twigs, leaves and acorns and many other items.

After the funeral, the entrance to the first two rooms were walled, and the corridor was burned and filled with stones and soil. The façade was buried and hidden from view.

== Gallery ==
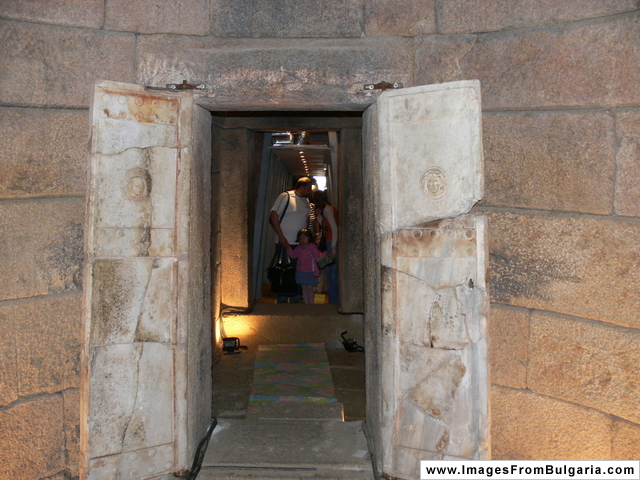

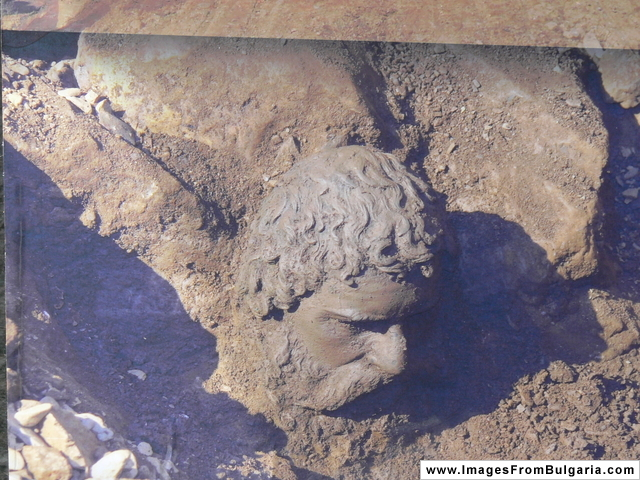

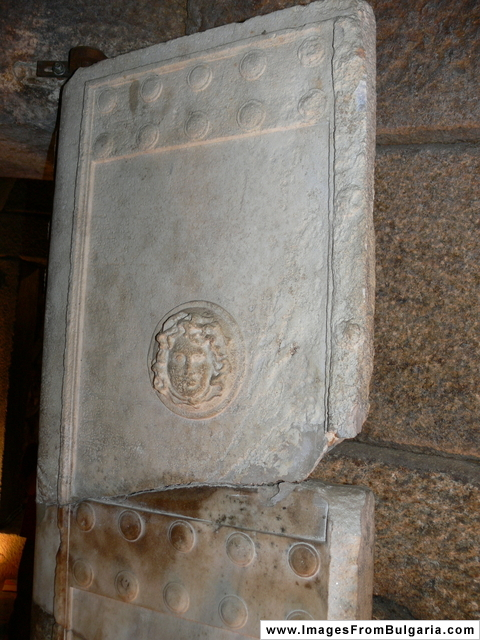

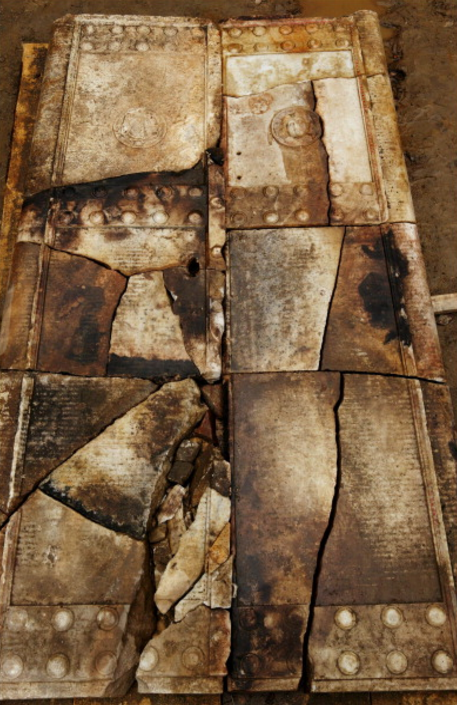
The marble door leading to the mausoleum.

== See also ==
- Georgi Kitov
- Thracian tomb of Aleksandrovo
- Thracian tomb of Cotys I (Mogilan mound)
- Thracian tomb Golyama Arsenalka
- Thracian tomb Griffins
- Thracian tomb Helvetia
- Thracian Tomb of Kazanlak
- Thracian tomb Ostrusha
- Thracian tomb Shushmanets
- Thracian Tomb of Sveshtari
- Valley of the Thracian Rulers
- Silistra Roman tomb
- Gold wreaths from Thrace
- Thracian treasure
