= Thracian tomb Shushmanets =

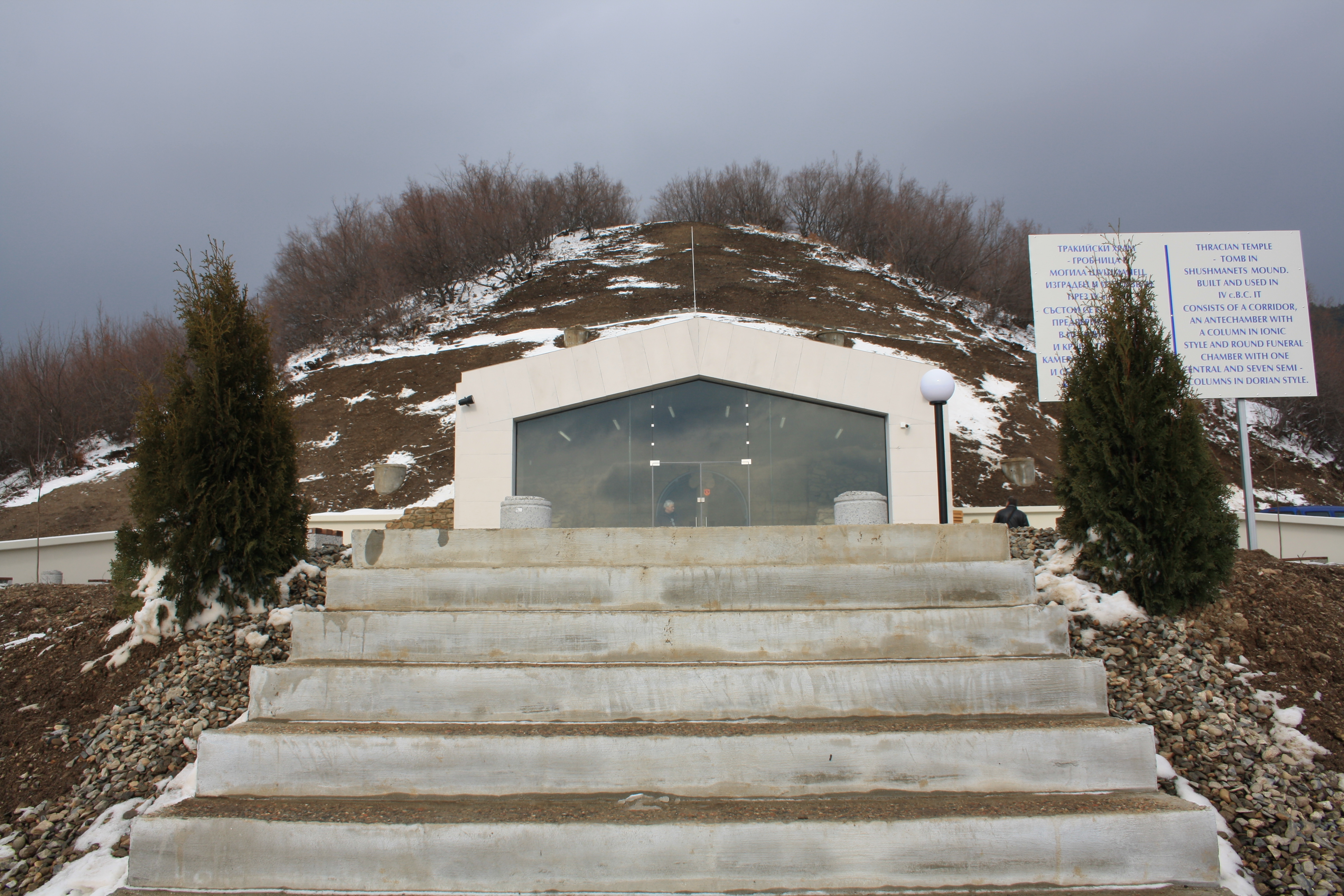
Outside view

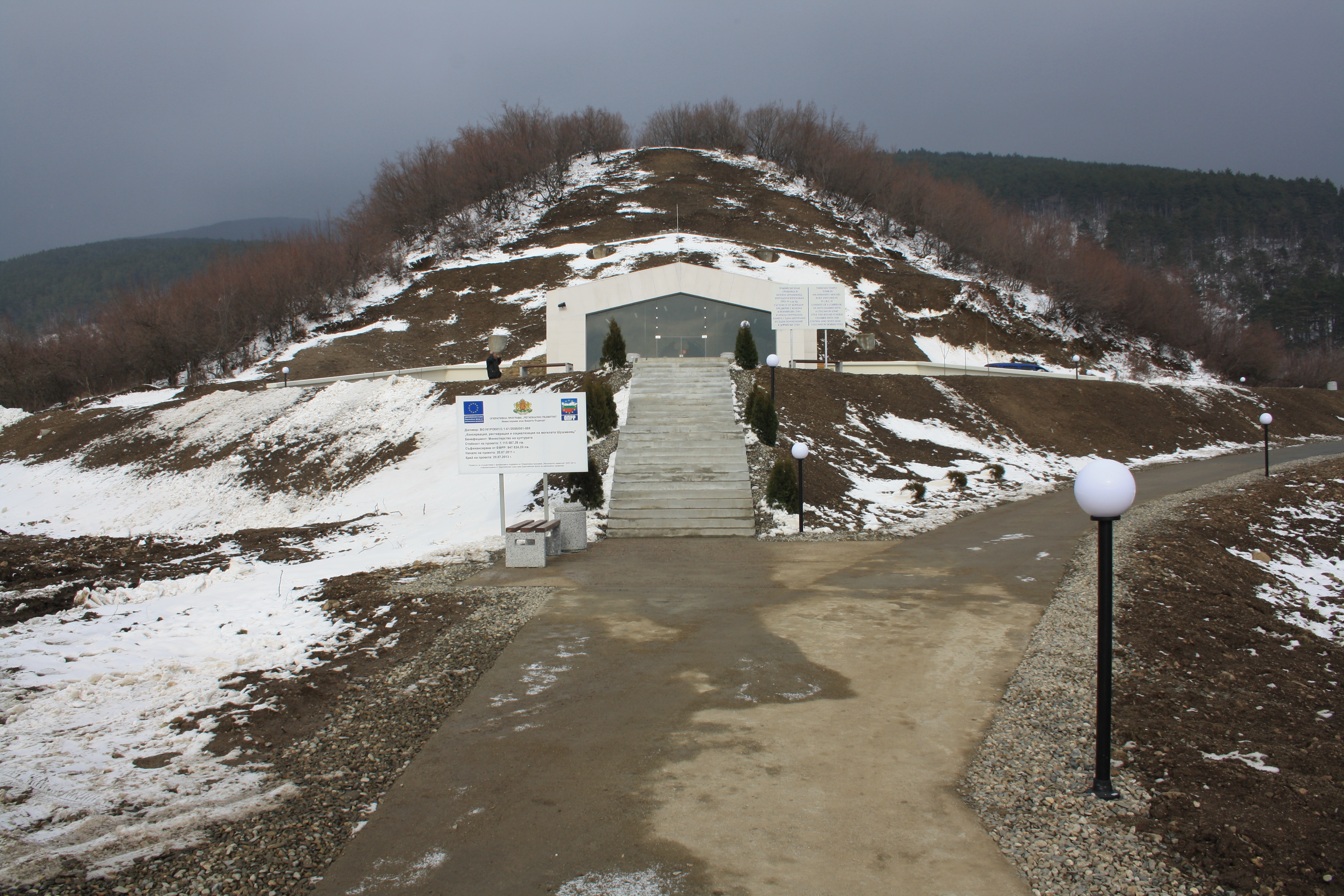
Panorama view

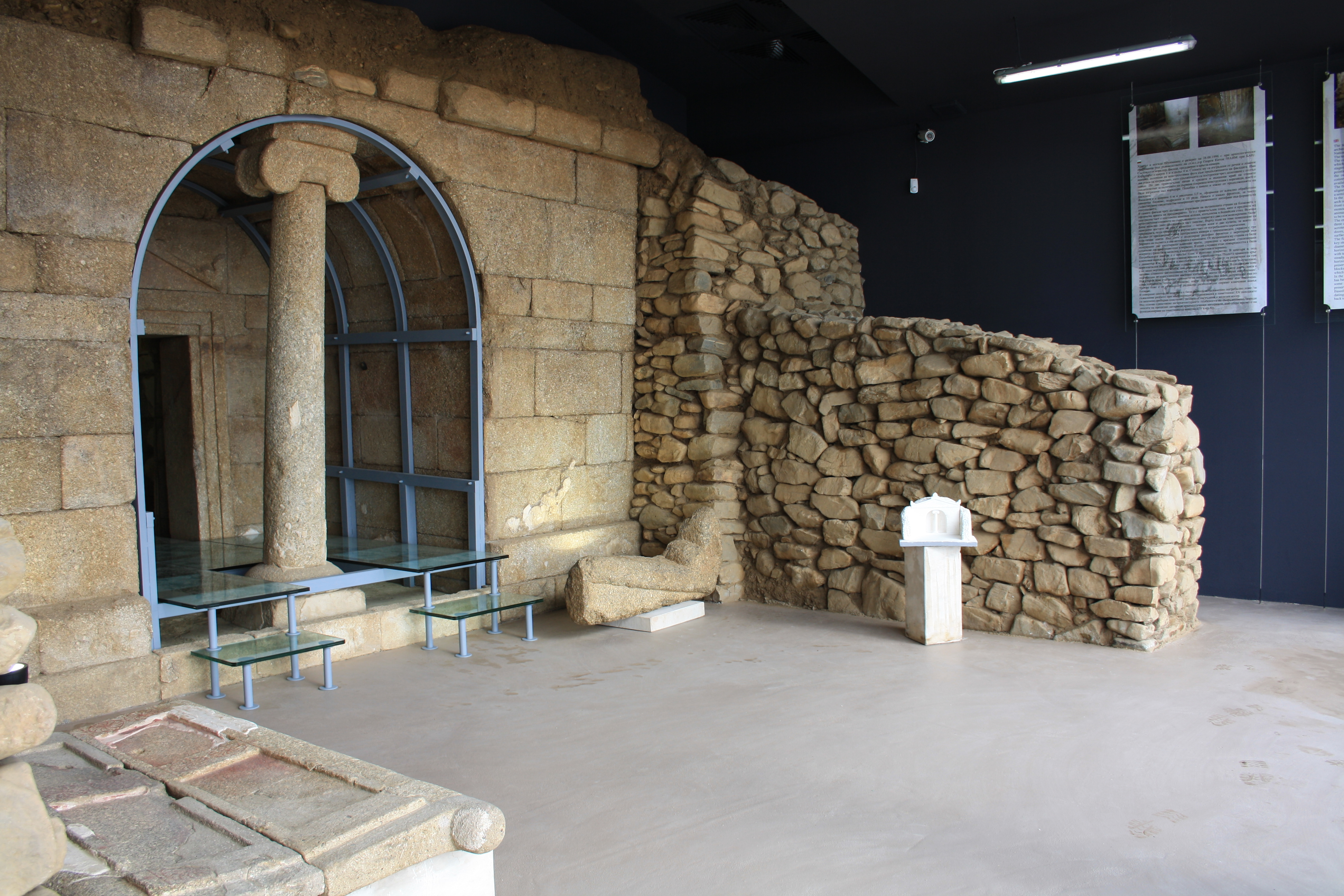
Inside view

The Thracian tomb at Shushmanets is a mound located in the Valley of the Thracian Rulers. It was built as a temple in the 4th century BC and later used as a tomb.

== Architecture ==
The temple has a long and wide entry corridor and an antechamber, a semi-cylindrical room supported by an elegant column. The top of this column has the form of a knucklebone. Four horses and two dogs were sacrificed in the antechamber. The central room is circular in shape, supported by a beautiful polished Doric column ending with a large disc symbolizing the sun. The tomb's columns represent Thracian beliefs about the universe and the creation myth. Archaeologist Georgi Kitov discovered the tomb in 1996.

== See also ==
- Thracian tomb of Aleksandrovo
- Thracian tomb of Cotys I (Mogilan mound)
- Thracian tomb Golyama Arsenalka
- Thracian tomb Griffins
- Thracian tomb Helvetia
- Thracian Tomb of Kazanlak
- Thracian tomb Ostrusha
- Thracian tomb of Seuthes III
- Thracian Tomb of Sveshtari
- Valley of the Thracian Rulers
- Roman Tomb (Silistra)
