= Mogilan mound =

- Могиланска могила (Bulgarian)
- Mogilanska mound
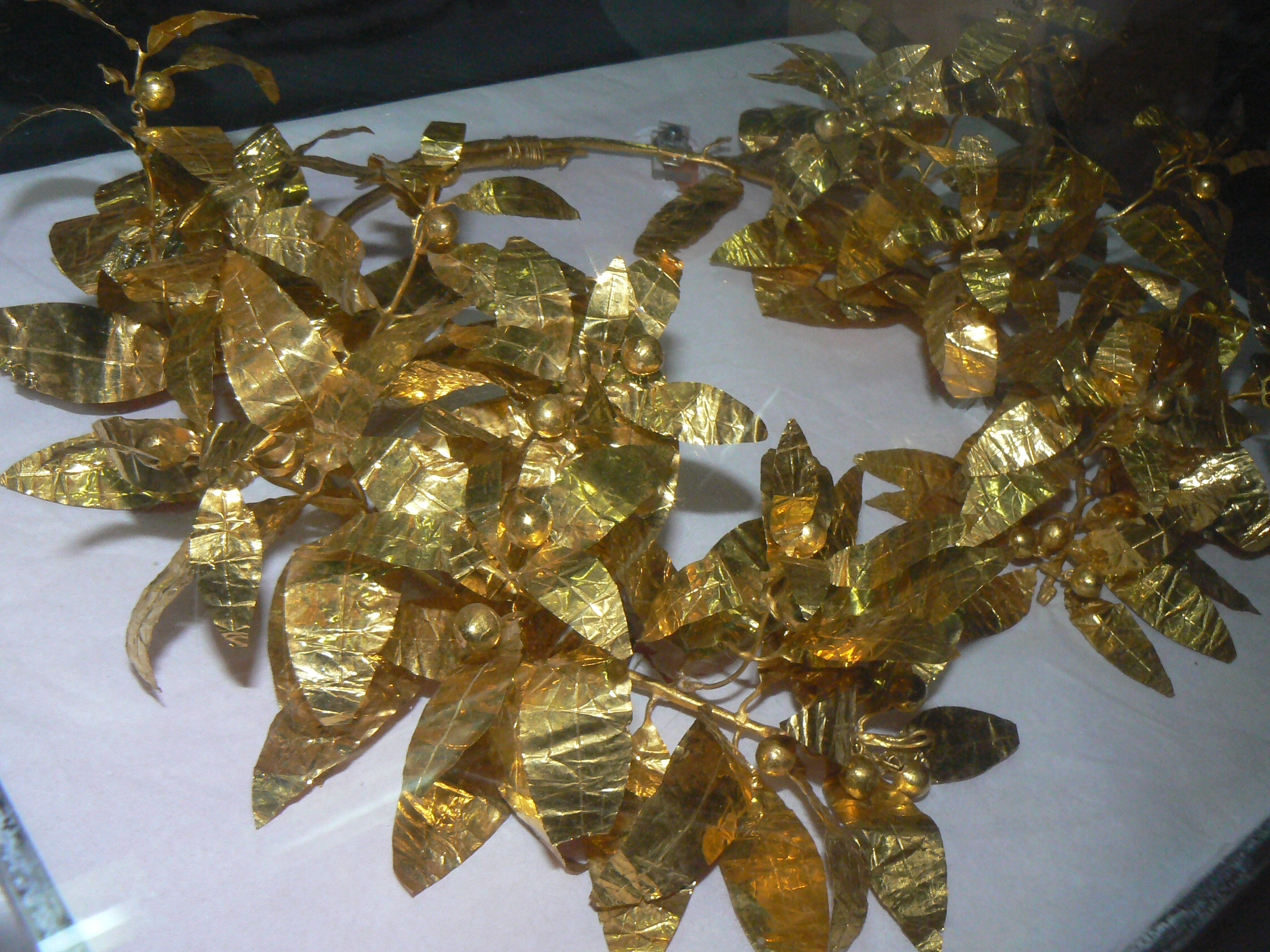
- The gold wreath from the Mogilan gold treasure

- Mogilan mound location - Bulgaria, Vratsa
- 43°12′3″N 23°33′3″E
- Type: Tumulus
- Periods: Classical antiquity
- Location: Vratsa
- Region: Vratsa Province

The Mogilan mound or Mogilanska mound is a burial mound in the center of Vratsa, Bulgaria.

During excavations in 1965–66, 3 tombs were found in it, built of stone. One of them - tomb No 2, was found intact and yielded a rich treasure-trove of artifacts.

Tomb No 2 consists of an anteroom and a chamber. In the anteroom there was a chariot and the remains of a sacrificed horse, whose ammunition has a complete set of silver decorations. In the chamber there was a funeral with many treasures: a gold wreath and earrings, a gilded silver knee pad with an image of the great mother goddess, a set of magic figurines, as well as different vessels and objects made of silver, bronze and ceramics. Some vessels bear the name of the Odrysian ruler Cotys I.

The other two tombs were looted in antiquity and yielded only a small amount of random objects – a gold and silver jug and others. It is likely that prominent members of the ruler dynasty of the Triballi were buried in those tombs in the 4th century BC.

The artifacts are stored in the regional historical muzeum of Vratsa.

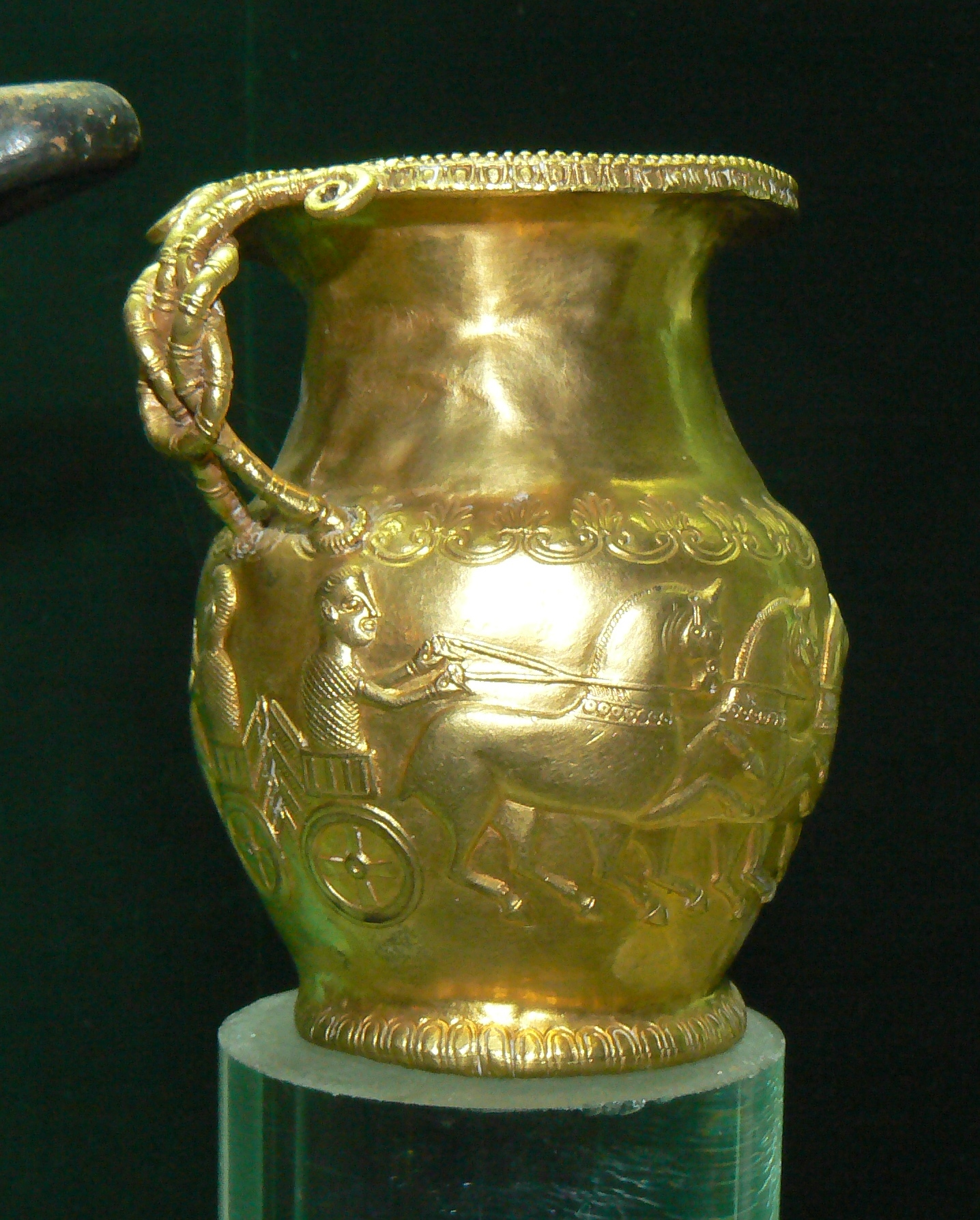
golden pitcher

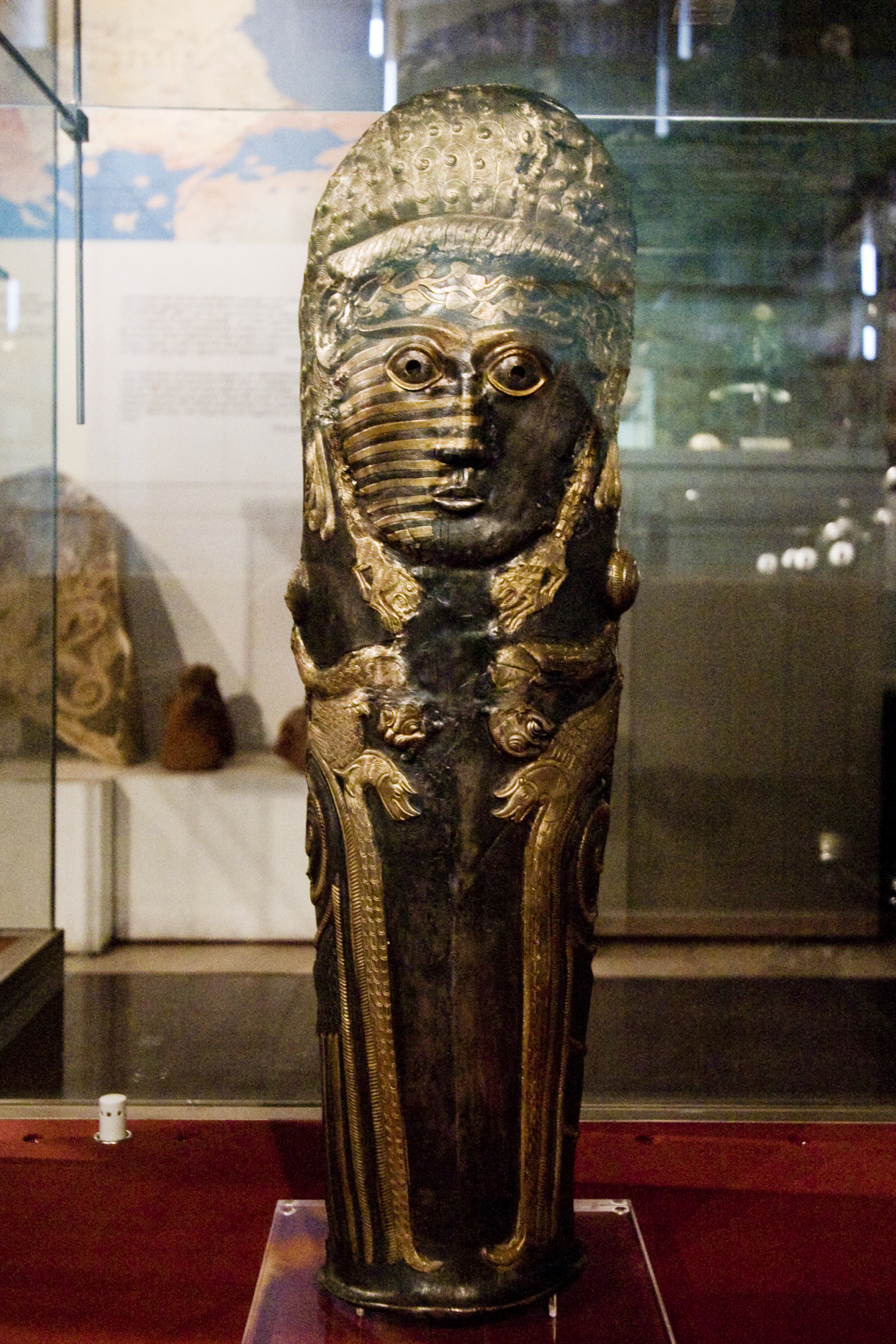
funeral offering

== See also ==
- Thracian tomb of Aleksandrovo
- Thracian tomb Golyama Arsenalka
- Thracian tomb Griffins
- Thracian tomb Helvetia
- Thracian Tomb of Kazanlak
- Thracian tomb Ostrusha
- Thracian tomb of Seuthes III
- Thracian tomb Shushmanets
- Thracian Tomb of Sveshtari
- Valley of the Thracian Rulers
- Roman Tomb (Silistra)
- Gold wreaths from Thrace
- Thracian treasure
