= Thracian tomb Helvetia =

Coordinates: 42°42′20.0154″N 25°20′47.184″E

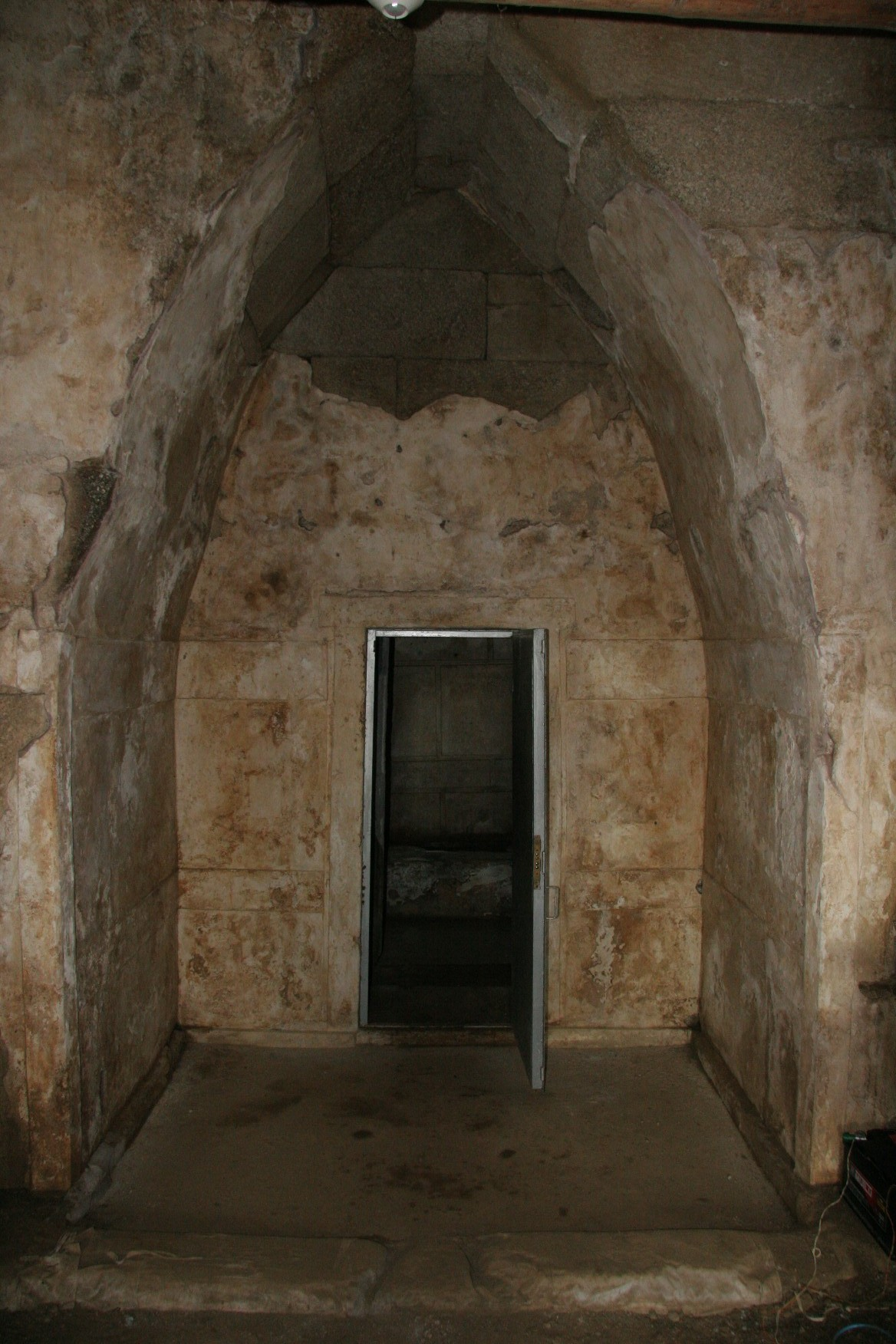
entrance of the tomb

The Thracian tomb "Helvetia" mound near Shipka, Bulgaria, was built in the middle of the 4th century BC.

== Construction ==
The walls of the tomb's entrance corridor are made of stone. After this corridor an antechamber is followed by a rectangular chamber with a unique covered ceiling. The ceiling is bent by the walls of both rooms, crossed by a horizontal zone.

This marks the transition from the double-pitched, to the semi-cylindrical, ceiling of chambers in Thracian architecture. The floor of the tomb is plastered, and the walls of the antechamber and the other rooms were covered with a coating.

Through the horizontal and vertical grooves, they were covered by large marble blocks. The chamber had a stone door that locked from the inside. Opposite the entrance, a ritual stone bed was located in the room. The last funeral that occurred in the antechamber is believed to be that of a horse.

== See also ==
- Thracian tomb of Aleksandrovo
- Thracian tomb of Cotys I (Mogilan mound)
- Thracian tomb Golyama Arsenalka
- Thracian tomb Griffins
- Thracian Tomb of Kazanlak
- Thracian tomb Ostrusha
- Thracian tomb of Seuthes III
- Thracian tomb Shushmanets
- Thracian Tomb of Sveshtari
- Valley of the Thracian Rulers
- Roman Tomb (Silistra)
