= Cothelas =

4th-century BC Thracian ruler

Cothelas (Ancient Greek: Κοθήλας), also known as Gudila (fl. 4th century BC), was a king of the Getae who ruled an area near the Black Sea, between northern Thrace and the Danube. His polity also included the important port of Odessos. Around 341 BC, he concluded a treaty with Macedonian king Philip II, becoming his vassal. This relation was further cemented when Cothelas' daughter, Meda of Odessos, became one of the Macedonian king's wives. The tomb of Cothelas is probably at the Getic burial complex near the present day Bulgarian village of Sveshtari, in North-Eastern Bulgaria.

A person by the name of Gudila is also mentioned in the Prosopography of the Later Roman Empire.
