= Thracian tomb Golyama Arsenalka =

Coordinates: 42°41′58.704″N 25°18′33.48″E

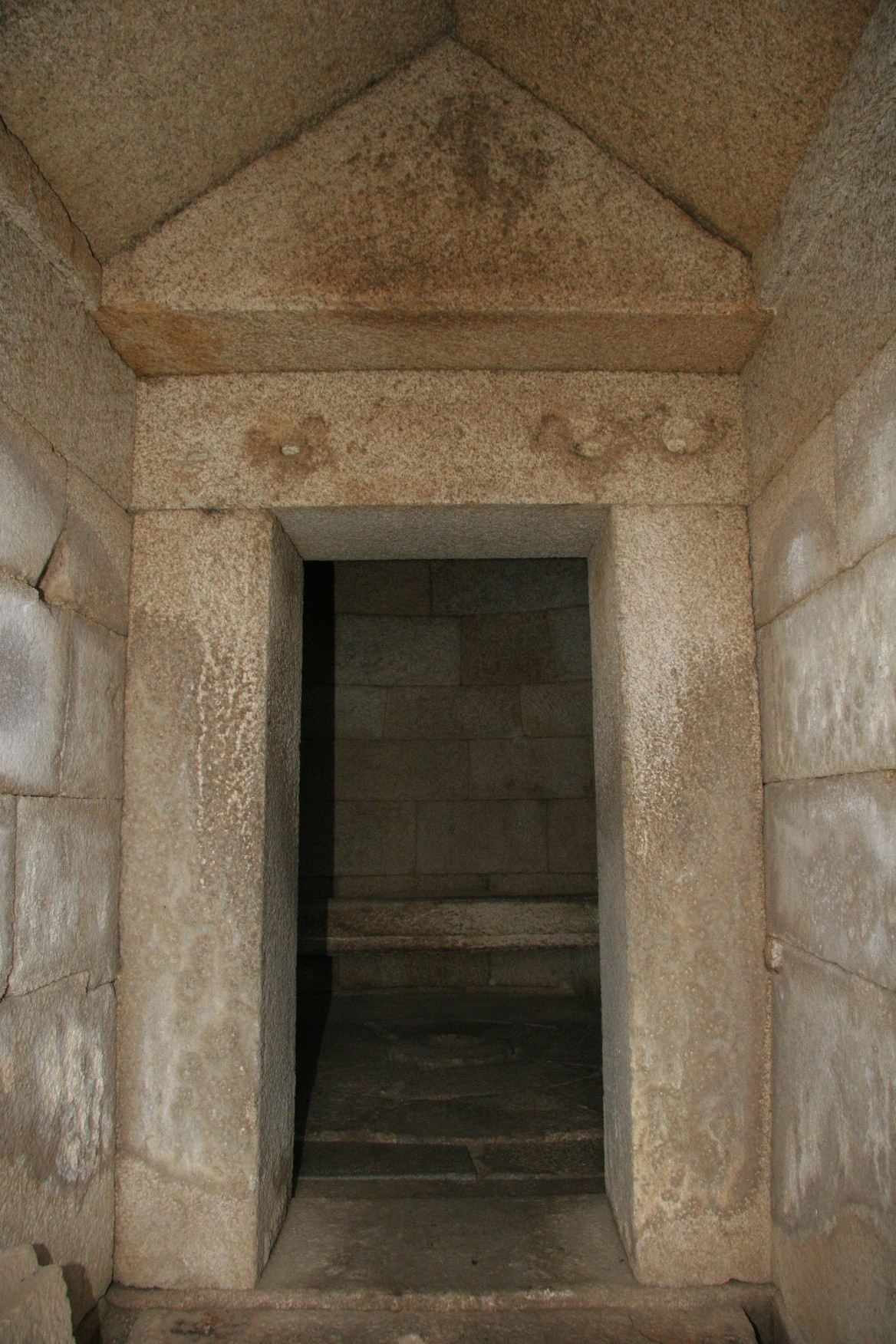
View from the antechamber

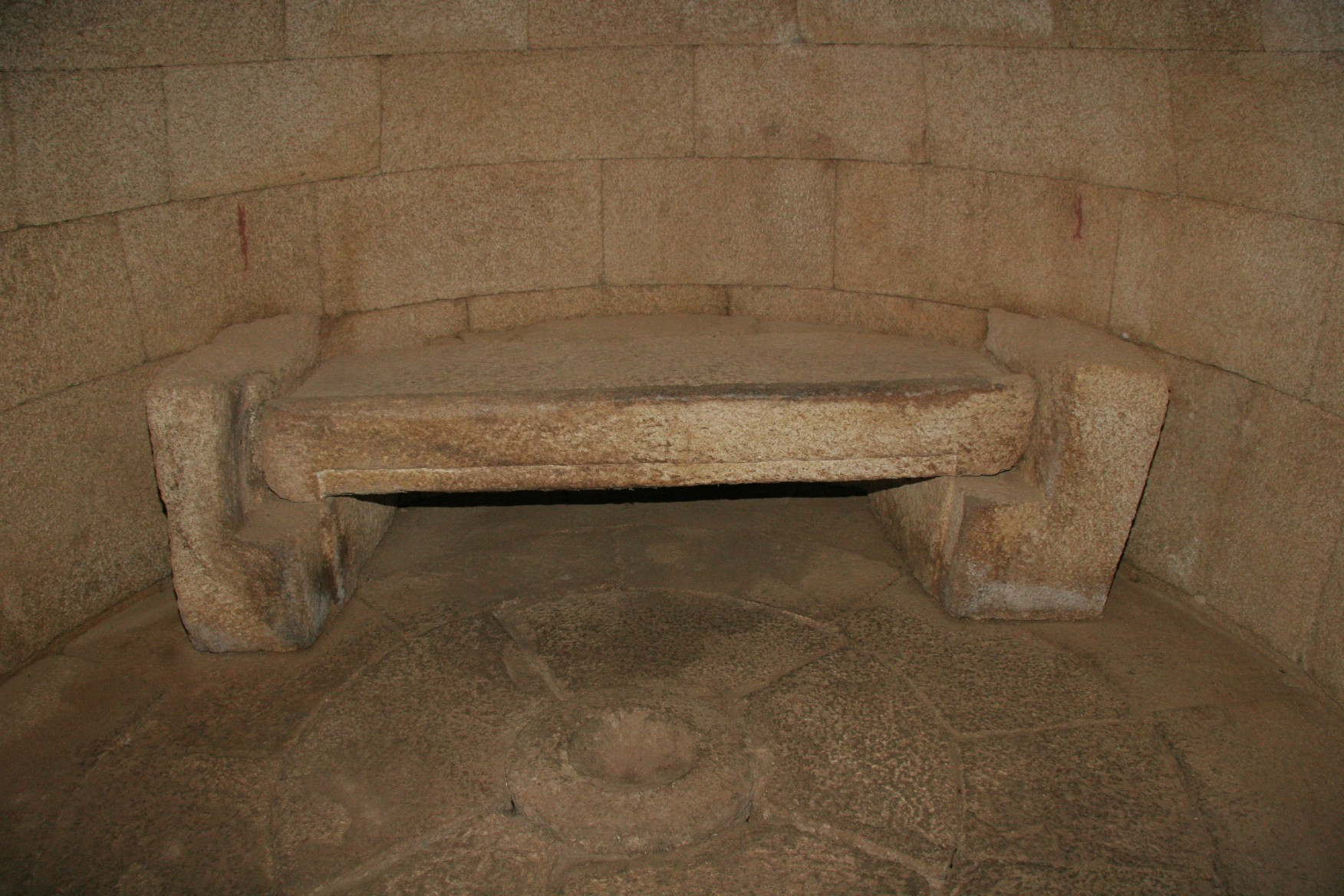
View from the domed main chamber

Golyama Arsenalka mound is a Thracian burial tumulus with a subterranean stone building near the Bulgarian town of Shipka. It dates from the end of 5th century BCE.

It is composed of a representative façade, a small antechamber and a domed chamber. The entrances have been closed with double stone doors. The floor of the antechamber is made of rammed soil, while the domed chamber is made up of specially fitted stones. In the center of the domed chamber there is a circular granite block. On the floor underneath it is a cavity surrounded by a ring of stones resembling the cult fireplaces in Seutopolis. Opposite to the entrance, there is a bed with east-west orientation. The temple was used for a funeral of a ruler or a nobleman. It was robbed of its valuables in antiquity, but parts of a gilt breast plate, two small gold ornaments, and bones of horses were found during excavations in the antechamber.

== See also ==
- Thracian tomb of Aleksandrovo
- Thracian tomb of Cotys I (Mogilan mound)
- Thracian tomb Griffins
- Thracian Tomb of Kazanlak
- Thracian tomb Helvetia
- Thracian tomb Ostrusha
- Thracian tomb of Seuthes III
- Thracian tomb Shushmanets
- Thracian Tomb of Sveshtari
- Valley of the Thracian Rulers
- Silistra Roman tomb
