= Roman Tomb (Silistra) =

Ancient Roman tomb in Bulgaria

Roman Tomb of Silistra
- Римска гробница в Силистра (Bulgarian); Rimska grobnitsa v Silistra (Bulgarian)
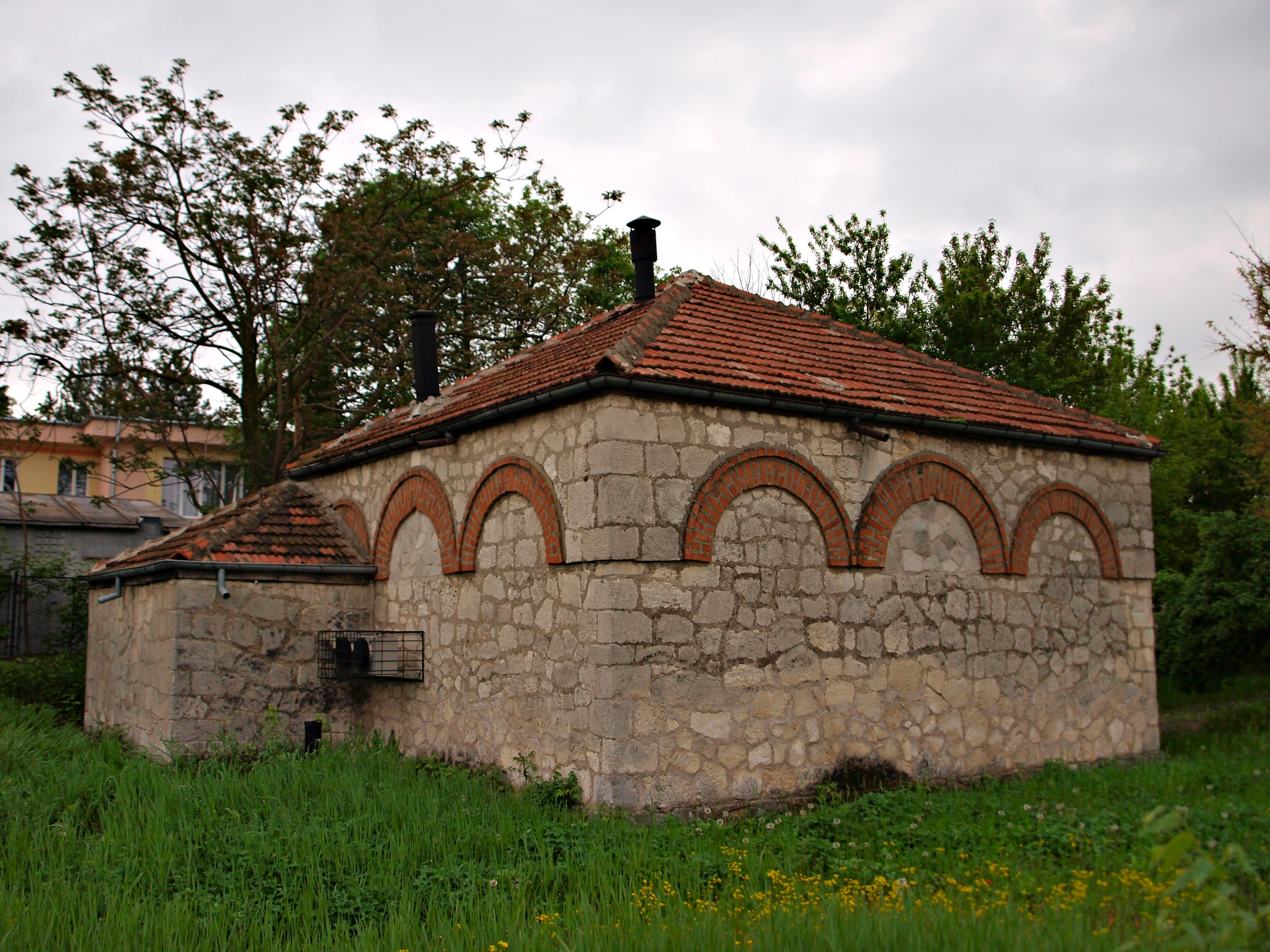
- Exterior view of the Roman Tomb of Silistra
- Interactive map of Roman Tomb of Silistra
- 44.110119°N 27.270892°E
- Type: Ancient Roman burial tomb
- Location: Silistra, Bulgaria

History
- Built: Mid-4th Century AD

Site notes
- Website: Regional Historical Museum of Silistra

The Roman Tomb of Silistra (Bulgarian: Римска гробница в Силистра, Rimska grobnitsa v Silistra) is an Ancient Roman burial tomb in the town of Silistra in northeastern Bulgaria. Dating to the mid-4th century AD, the Roman Tomb is the best-preserved architectural monument of the Ancient Roman city of Durostorum. The tomb is considered "one of the most investigated and most discussed monuments of the late antique art in Bulgaria" and the Balkans, owing in large part to the quality and extent of its interior frescoes.

== History ==
Though the influence of Christianity had reached Silistra by the time, the Roman Tomb is clearly an example of pagan art commissioned by a pagan owner. Thus, it is considered likely that it predates Theodosius I's persecution of Roman paganism. Its construction also likely preceded the Gothic invasion of Durostorum of 376–378, which caused great turmoil in the city. The invasion may have caused the master's family depicted in the tomb to flee the city, explaining the lack of burials in the tomb. In any case, the tomb must be stylistically ascribed to the 4th century and specifically to Theodosius I's reign.

The Roman Tomb was coincidentally discovered in 1942 in the southern outskirts of Silistra, a major town in Southern Dobruja on the banks of the Lower Danube. Silistra had only recently been transferred by Romania back to Bulgaria as part of the 1940 Treaty of Craiova. Since 1984, the Roman Tomb of Silistra has been on UNESCO's Tentative List of World Heritage Sites.

== Architecture and frescoes ==
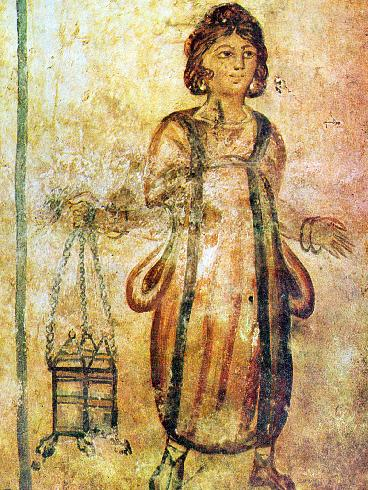
A fresco portraying a female servant carrying gifts to the master's family

The stone tomb features a single burial chamber and measures 3.30 by 2.60 metres (10.8 by 8.5 feet). It has a west–east orientation, with the entrance on the east wall and a semi-cylindrical brick vault. It is located amidst the ruins of a necropolis from Late Antiquity which included other similar structures.

Ceramic plates, rectangular in shape and painted using the fresco-secco technique, cover the entirety of its floor. In contrast to most other known Roman tombs from the period in the Balkans, the entire interior is covered by multi-coloured mural paintings. The northern, southern and eastern walls feature a procession of servants, whereas the frescoes of the western wall, directly opposite the entrances, depict the master and his wife.

A frieze running along the walls of the tomb contains 11 panels featuring the portraits of male and female slaves bringing various gifts and garments to the masters. The procession runs from either side of the central panel that portrays the masters, providing for a symmetrical composition. The tomb's decoration also includes hunting scenes, candlesticks, plants and animals, including peacocks and pigeons. Overall, the decoration's remarkable level of preservation and the quality of the mural paintings makes the tomb a "unique example of art and life" in the outer regions of the Roman Empire during the turbulent 4th century.

The Roman Tomb of Silistra is situated at the intersection of the Sedmi Septemvri and Boyka Voyvoda Streets in the town. As of 2016, it can only be toured after a prior reservation at the Regional Historical Museum of Silistra.

== See also ==
- Thracian tomb of Aleksandrovo
- Thracian tomb of Cotys I (Mogilan mound)
- Thracian tomb Golyama Arsenalka
- Thracian tomb Griffins
- Thracian tomb Helvetia
- Thracian Tomb of Kazanlak
- Thracian tomb Ostrusha
- Thracian tomb of Seuthes III
- Thracian tomb Shushmanets
- Thracian Tomb of Sveshtari
- Valley of the Thracian Rulers
