= Thracian tomb of Aleksandrovo =

Thracian burial mound

Coordinates: 41°58′47″N 25°44′17″E

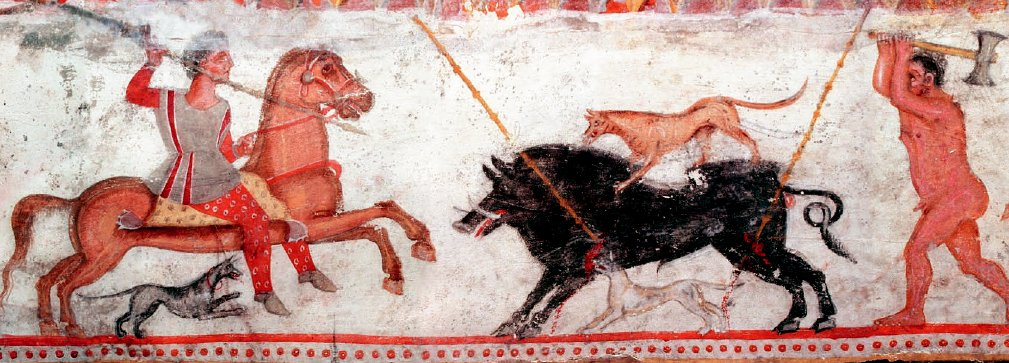
Hunting scene on the main chamber fresco

The Aleksandrovo tomb is a Thracian burial mound and tomb excavated near Aleksandrovo, Haskovo Province, South-Eastern Bulgaria, dated to c. 4th century BCE.

On December 17, 2000, the tomb was accidentally uncovered by an earth-moving machine. Looters subsequently entered the tomb, damaging some of its frescoes. In 2001 Bulgarian archaeologist Georgi Kitov led a rescue excavation of the tomb, discovering a round chamber of about 3 meters (9.8 ft) in diameter, accessible through a small antechamber and a tunnel, approximately 6 meters (20 ft) long. Both the antechamber and main chamber are decorated with well-preserved frescoes that reflect the artist's knowledge of Late Classical and Early Hellenistic art. The fresco in the main chamber depicts a hunting scene where a boar is attacked by a mounted hunter and a naked man wielding a double-axe. The double-axe is interpreted as representing royal power, the naked man as representing Zalmoxis, the Thracian solar god corresponding to Zeus.

A graffito in the chamber inscribed with the Thracian name Kozemases indicates either the tomb's noble patron or its artist.

The Thracian tomb of Alexandrovo is dated at early 4th century BCE. Wall paintings exhibit the change in appearance due to Greek influence. In the wall-paintings beards, tattoos, cloaks, boots, hats, top-knots have disappeared. Greek footwear replaces their boots. The tomb may be that of Triballi.

Also other changes are seen such as Thracians wearing gold or bronze torcs around their necks (usually three).

Nowadays, the original tomb has been preserved and closed for visitors but exact replica was built and presented in The Museum Center of Thracian art in Rhodope Mountain. The replica showcase the magnificent Thracian frescoes depicting their lifestyle in a distinctive "authentically Thracian art style".

In 2021, The tomb and The Museum Center of Thracian art in Rhodope Mountain was awarded European Heritage Label and became the first Bulgarian site to receive the honor.

== Gallery ==
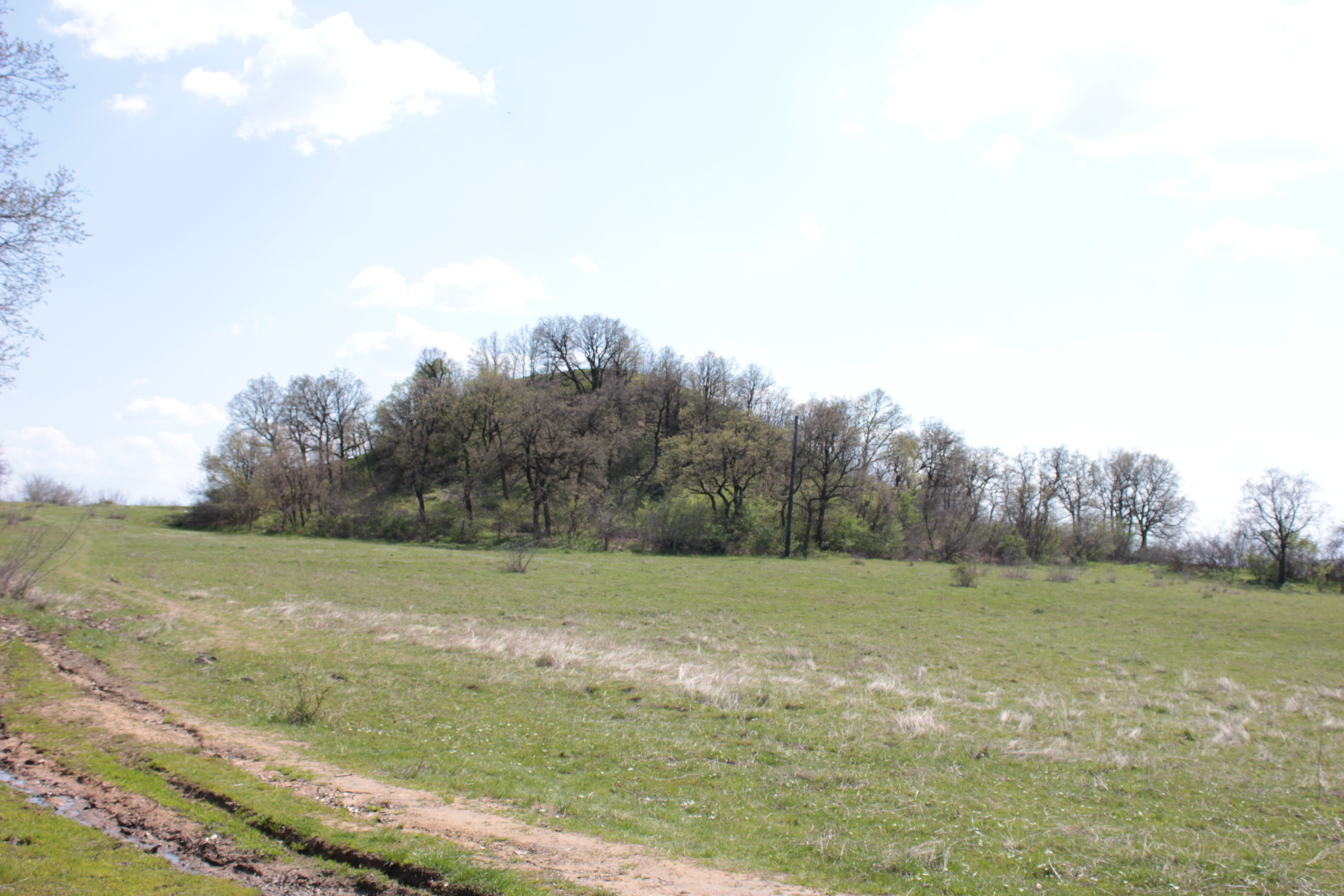
Alexandrovo Burial mound

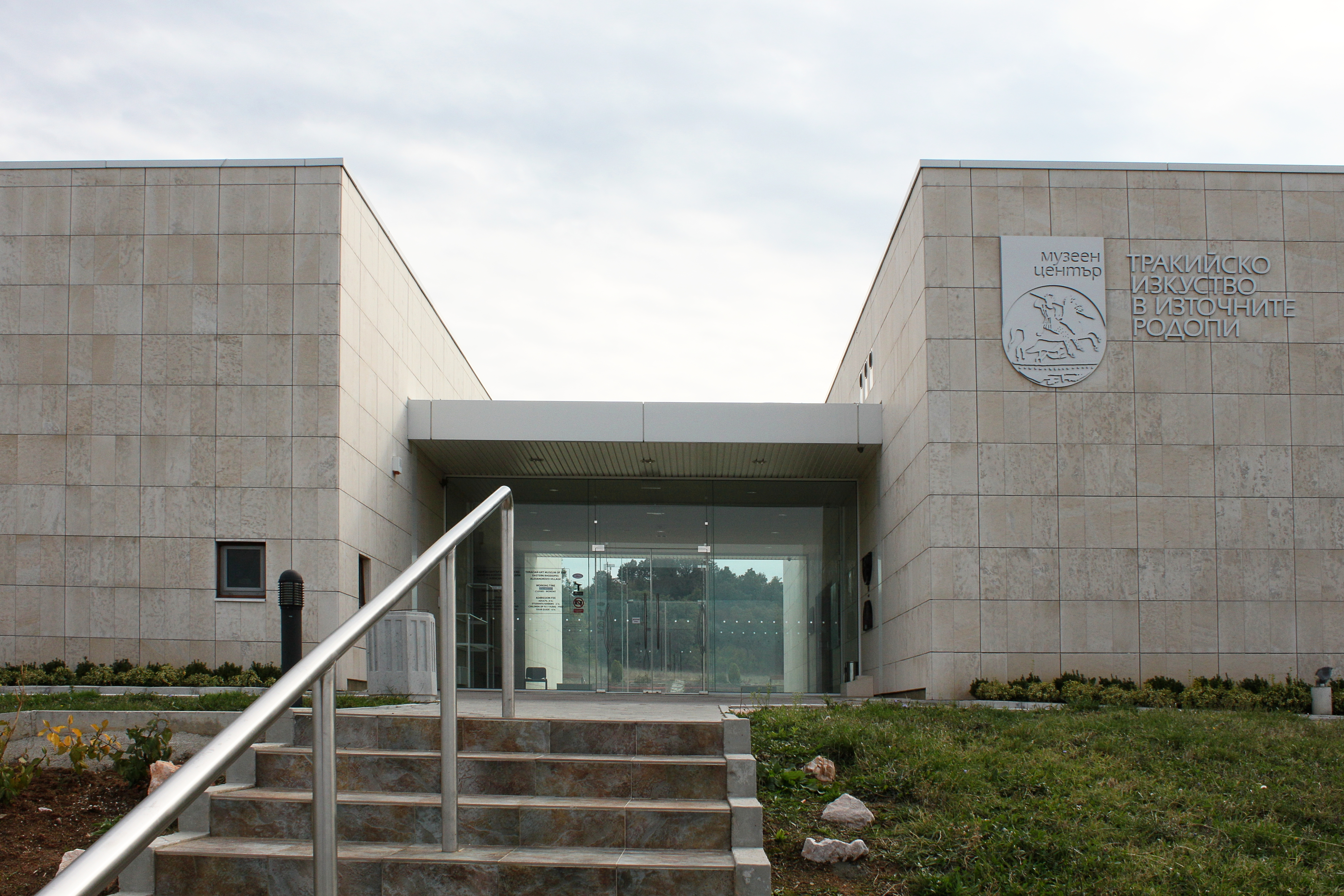

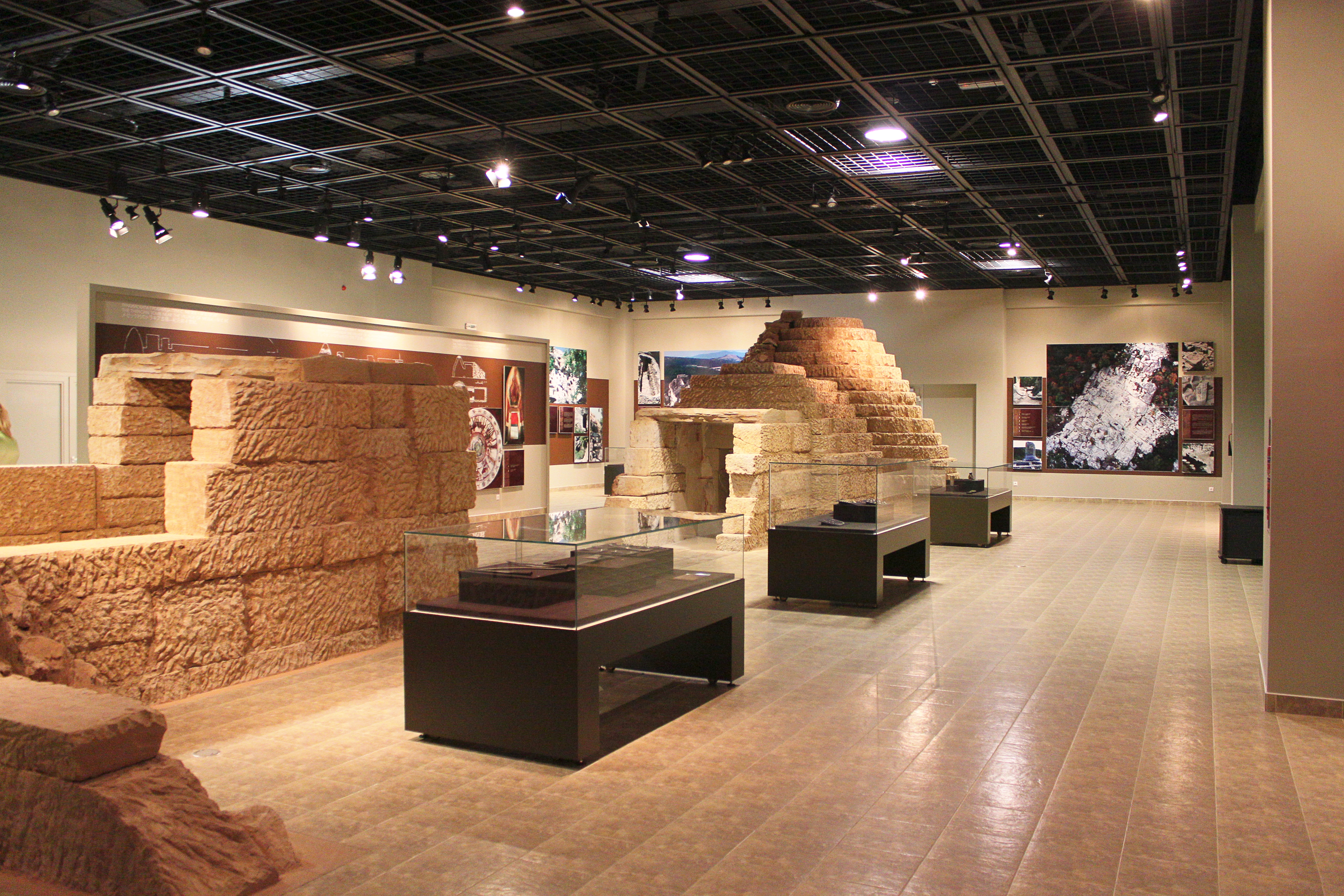

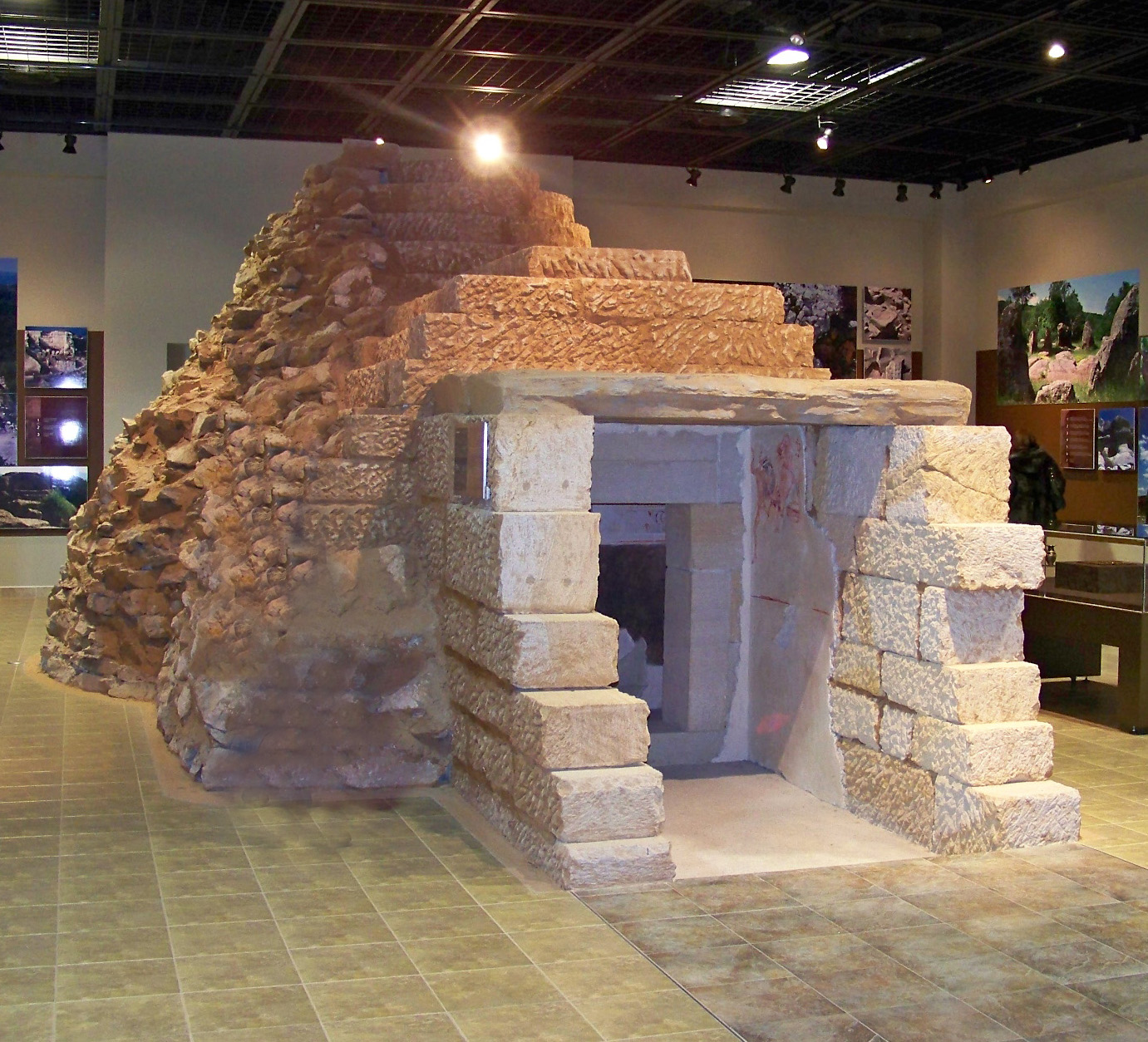

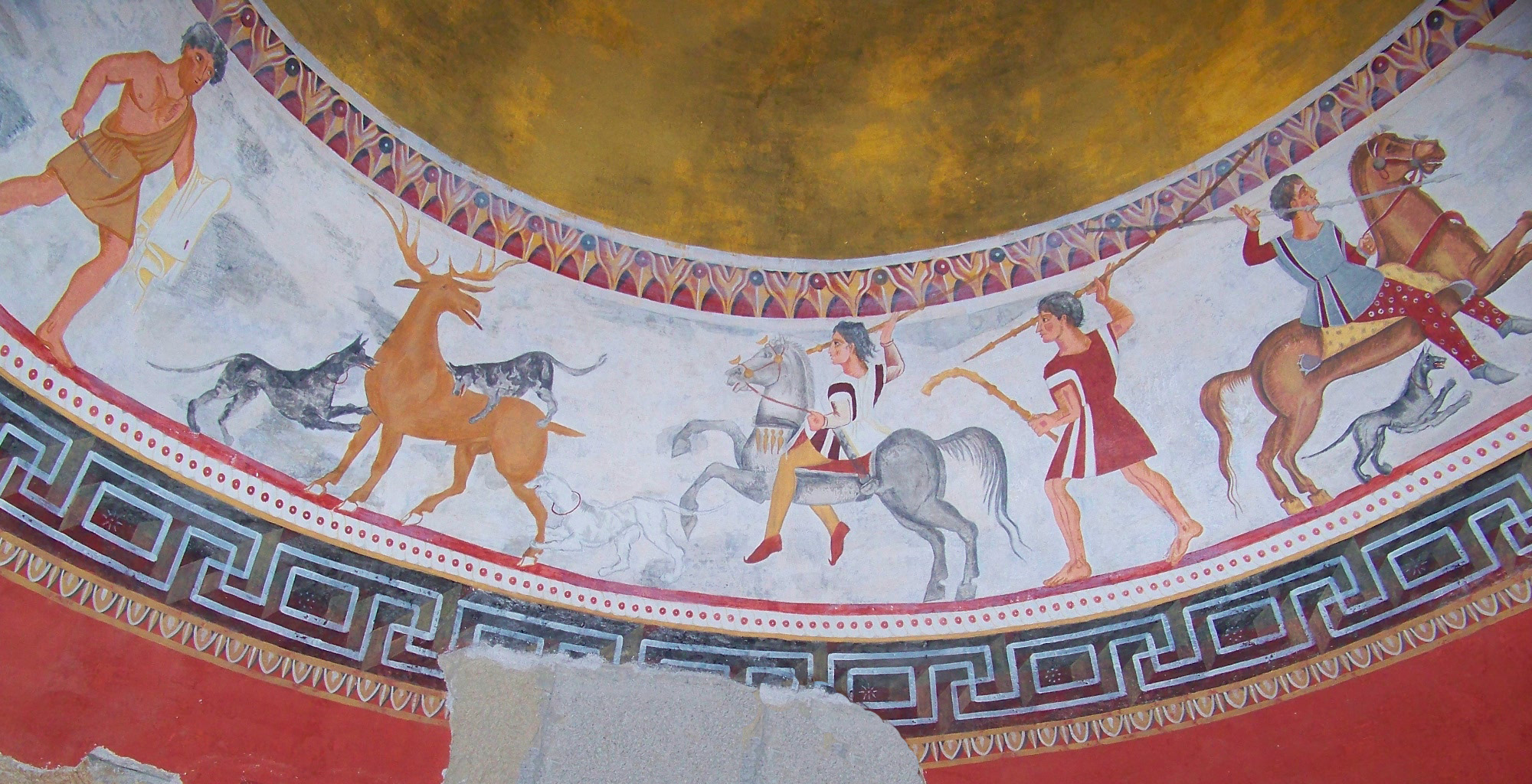

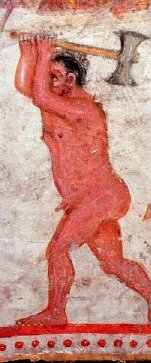

== See also ==
- Thracian tomb of Cotys I (Mogilan mound)
- Thracian tomb Golyama Arsenalka
- Thracian tomb Griffins
- Thracian tomb Helvetia
- Thracian Tomb of Kazanlak
- Thracian tomb Ostrusha
- Thracian tomb of Seuthes III
- Thracian tomb Shushmanets
- Thracian Tomb of Sveshtari
- Valley of the Thracian Rulers
- Roman Tomb (Silistra)
