= Thracian tomb Griffins =

Coordinates: 42°42′19.8714″N 25°20′40.9554″E

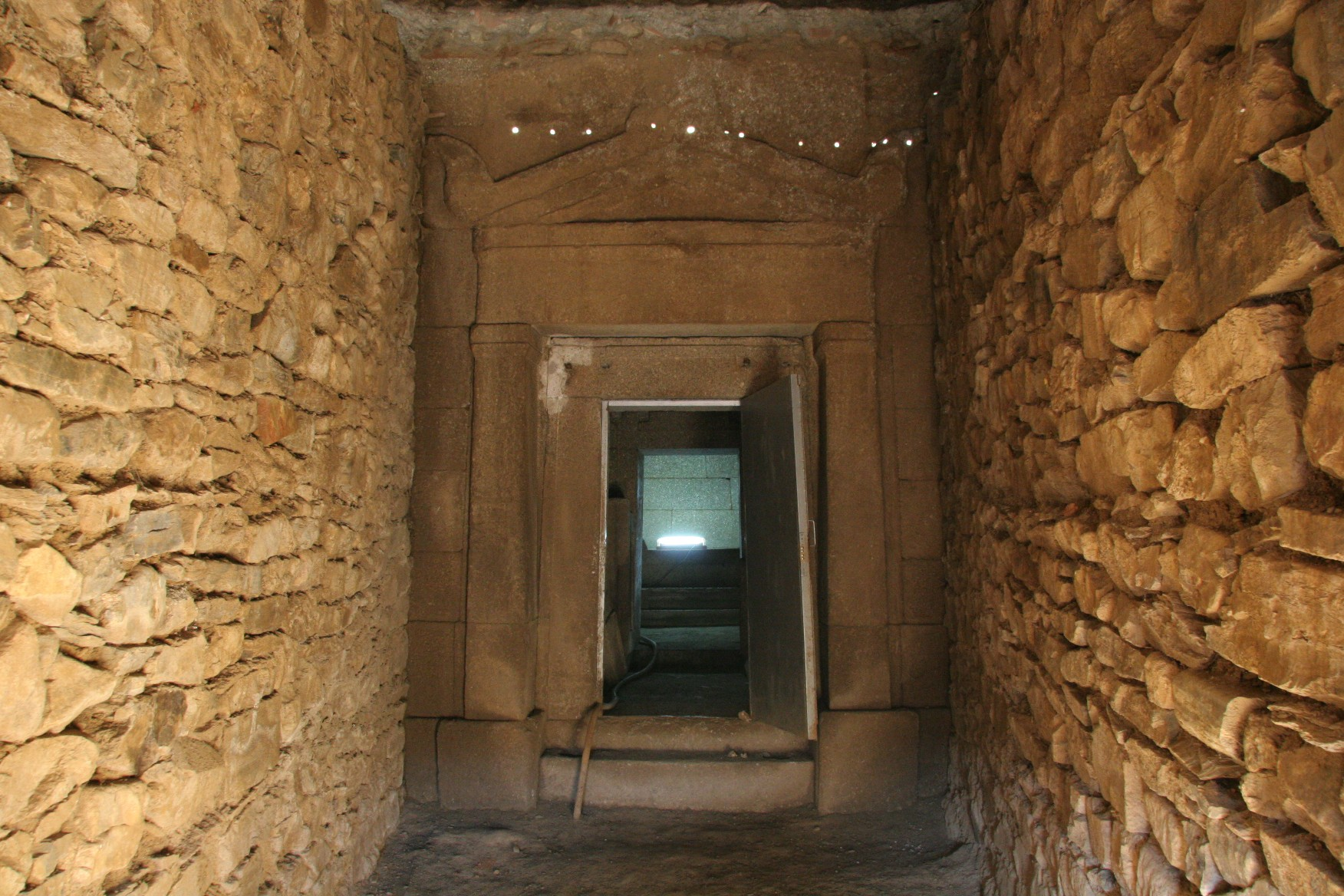
Entrance of the tomb

The Thracian tomb Griffins, found in Bulgaria, has a façade decorated with plastic columns and with a pediment above them. The pediment`s ends are semi-palmettes, the lower leaves of which are elongated and look like heads of griffins. The temple was built in the 5th century BC. There is a corridor made from river stones, floored with earth. The façade, the antechamber and the circular chamber are built of granite blocks. The entrances to the antechamber and the dome chamber had been closed by stone doors which were found broken during the research of the facility. The antechamber is of rectangular shape and has a double-pitched roof. The round chamber is covered with fine-made dome. The floors of both rooms are made of plastered granite slabs. Opposite the entrance of the circular chamber is situated a ritual stone bed with decorations. On a stone block in front of the bed were found gold paws. A funeral took place in the temple in the 4th century BC. The corridor was filled with river stones and soil. It was robbed in antiquity.

== See also ==
- Thracian tomb of Aleksandrovo
- Thracian tomb of Cotys I (Mogilan mound)
- Thracian tomb Golyama Arsenalka
- Thracian Tomb of Kazanlak
- Thracian tomb Helvetia
- Thracian tomb Ostrusha
- Thracian tomb of Seuthes III
- Thracian tomb Shushmanets
- Thracian Tomb of Sveshtari
- Valley of the Thracian Rulers
- Roman Tomb (Silistra)
