= Thracian Tomb of Sveshtari =

3rd-century BCE tomb in northeastern Bulgaria

Thracian Tomb of Svestari
UNESCO World Heritage Site
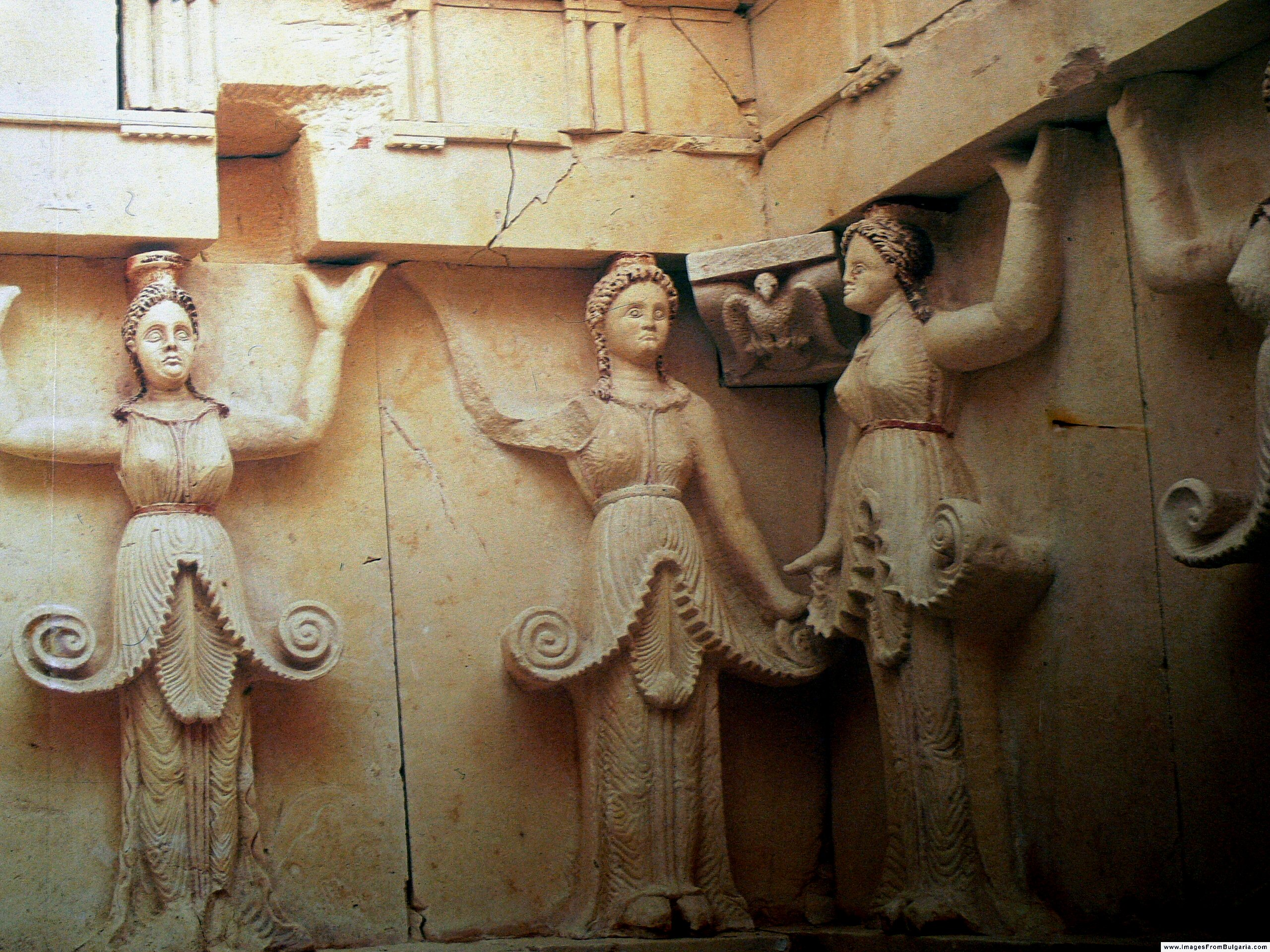

- Location within Bulgaria
- Location: Razgrad Province, Bulgaria
- Criteria: Cultural: (i), (iii)
- Reference: 359
- Inscription: 1985 (9th Session)
- Area: 647.6 ha (1,600 acres)
- Coordinates: 43°44′42″N 26°45′59″E

The Thracian Tomb of Svestari (Свещарска гробница, Sveshtarska grobnitsa) is 2.5 kilometers (1.6 mi) southwest of the village of Sveshtari, Razgrad Province, which is 42 kilometers (26 mi) northeast of Razgrad, in northeast Bulgaria. The tomb is probably the grave of Dromichaetes (Ancient Greek: Δρομιχαίτης, romanized: Dromichaites; c. 300 – c. 280 BC) who was a king of the Getae on both sides of the lower Danube (present day Romania and Bulgaria) around 300 BC, and his wife, the daughter of King Lysimachus (Greek: Λυσίμαχος, Lysimachos; c. 360 – 281 BCE) who was a general and diadochus (i.e., "successor") of Alexander the Great. The tomb is a UNESCO World Heritage Site.

== General information ==
The tomb was discovered and excavated in 1982 during excavations at Mound No 7 of the East Mound Necropolis of Sboryanovo (Ginina Mogila) – a tumulus of the early Hellenistic period. The Sveshtari tomb was built in the first quarter of the 3rd century BC. The tomb's construction reflects the fundamental structural principles of Thracian cult buildings. The tomb's architectural decor is considered to be unique, with polychrome half-human, half-plant caryatids and painted murals. The ten female figures carved in high relief on the walls of the central chamber and the decorations of the lunette in its vault are the only examples of this type found so far in the Thracian lands. It is an exceptional monument of the Getae, a Thracian people who were in contact with the Hellenistic and Hyperborean worlds, according to ancient geographers.

In 2012, archaeologists uncovered a significant treasure near the village. The treasure included a golden ring, 44 female figure depictions and 100 golden buttons, found in 150 tombs from the 4th century BC. It has been suggested that it is part of the site of the Getan city of Helis.

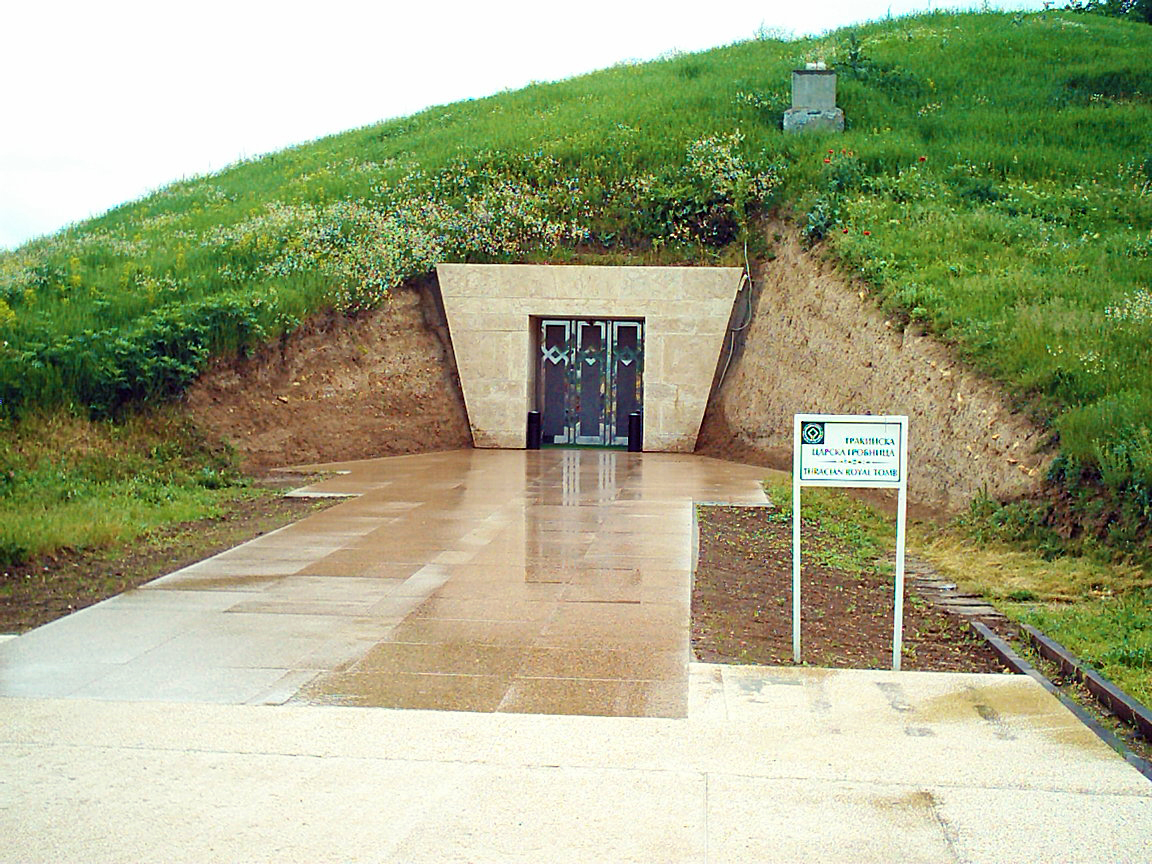
The Entrance to the Tomb Mound

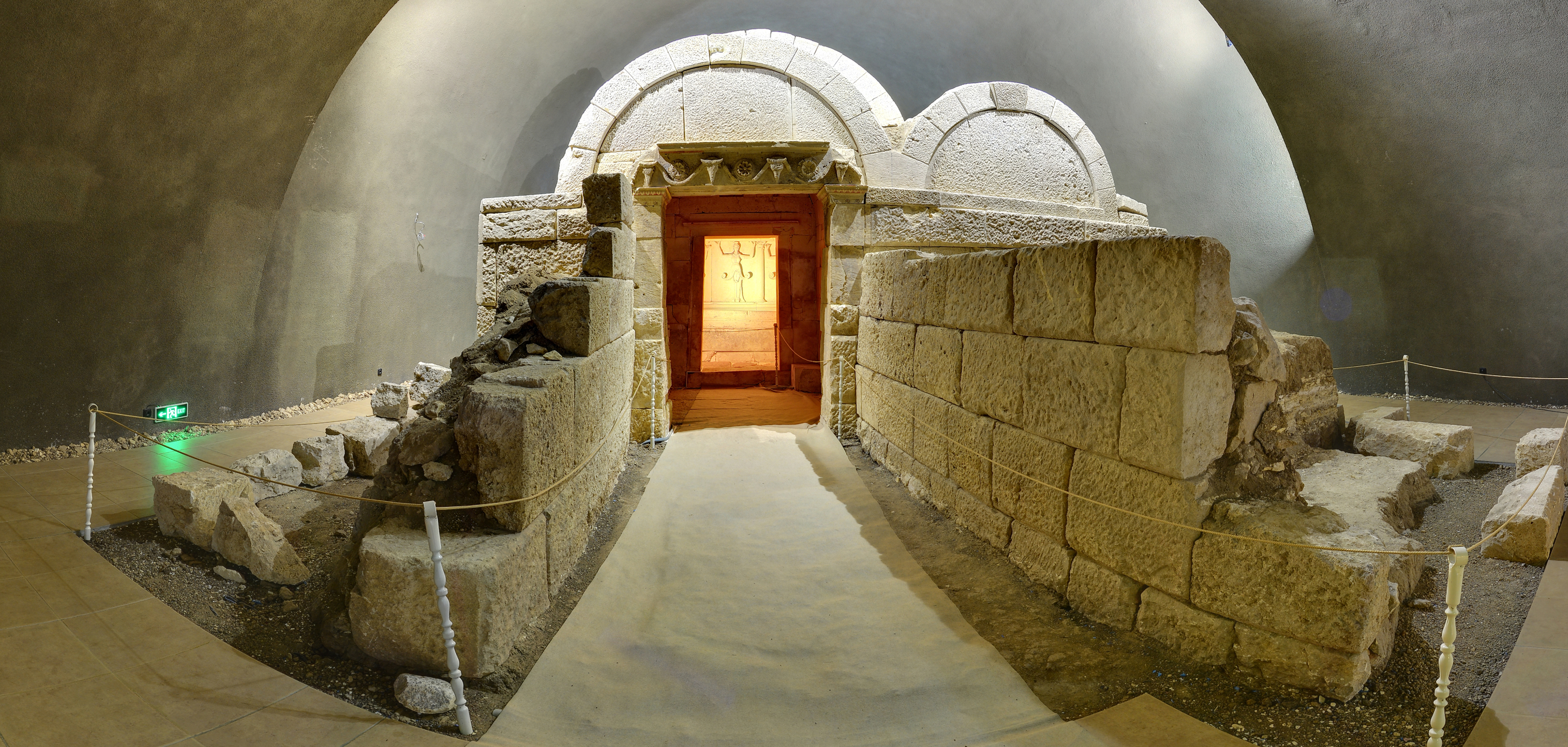
The interior of the tomb

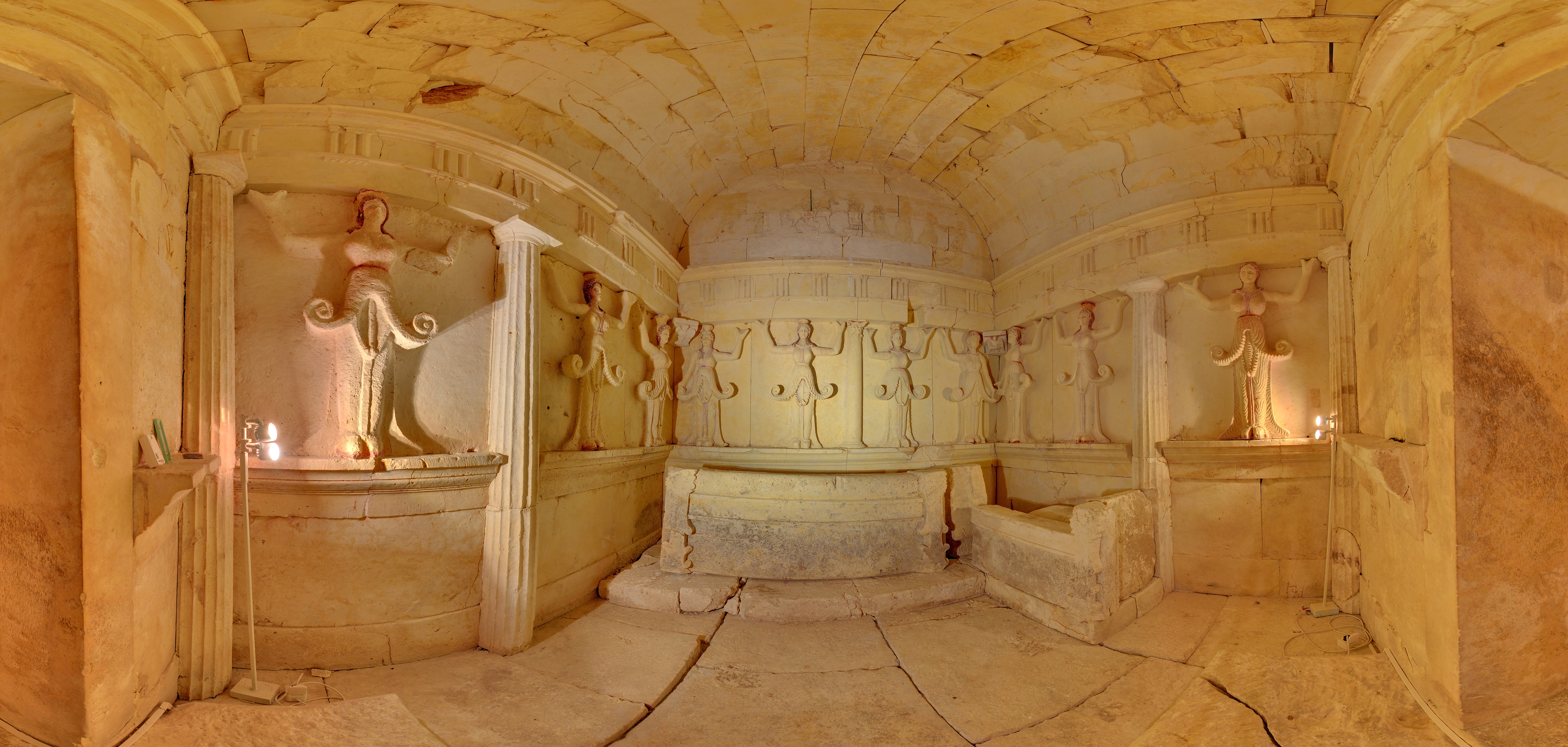
The Thracian Tomb of Sveshtari

== History ==
The Getae had been federated in the Odrysian kingdom in the 5th century BC. It is not known how the relations between Getae and Odrysians developed. The Balkan campaigns of Philip II of Macedon between 352 and 340 BC shattered Odrysian authority and the Getae profited from the situation. By the second half of the 4th century, the Getae occupied sites on both banks of the lower Danube and this region flourished as never before. The new Macedonian conquests, secured with considerable military power, caused consternation in the adjoining territories and thus stimulated the political fusion of the Getic tribes.

The Getic tomb at Sveshtari in the western Ludogorie in Bulgaria is also supposed to have been near the location of Helis. In the vicinity of the mausoleum, the remains of a large ancient city were found along with dozens of Getic mound tombs. The settlement is situated in a natural stronghold, a plateau surrounded like a peninsula by the ravines of Krapinets River. The outer stone wall, up to 4m thick, follows the edges of the peninsula and defends a territory of about 10 hectares. The inner wall, of similar construction, encloses a roughly quadrilateral area of about 5 hectares. The fortified territory was relatively densely occupied by dwellings connected by a network of thoroughfares. Dating finds such as amphorae stamps and coins indicate that this settlement existed between c. 335 and c. 250 BC.

== See also ==
- Thracian tomb of Aleksandrovo
- Thracian tomb of Cotys I (Mogilan mound)
- Thracian tomb Golyama Arsenalka
- Thracian tomb Griffins
- Thracian tomb Helvetia
- Thracian Tomb of Kazanlak
- Thracian tomb Ostrusha
- Thracian tomb of Seuthes III
- Thracian tomb Shushmanets
- Valley of the Thracian Rulers
- Roman Tomb (Silistra)

== Bibliography ==
- Archibald, Zofia H. (1994). "Thracians and Scythians". The Cambridge Ancient History. Vol. 6 (2 ed.).
- Delev, P. (2000). "Lysimachus, the Getae, and Archaeology". The Classical Quarterly. 50 (2). Cambridge University: 384–401. doi:10.1093/cq/50.2.384. ISSN 1471-6844. JSTOR 1558897.
- Emilov, Julij (2007). "La Tène finds and the indigenous communities in Thrace. Interrelations during the Hellenistic period". Studia Hercynia. 11: 57–75.
- Alexander Fol, M. Čičikova, T. Ivanov, T. Teofilov: The Thracian Tomb near the Village of Sveshtari, Sofia 1986.
- Alexander Fol: "Die thrakische Orphik oder Zwei Wege zur Unsterblichkeit", in Die Thraker. Das goldene Reich des Orpheus, Ausstellung 23. Juli bis 28. November 2004, Kunst- und Ausstellungshalle der Bundesrepublik Deutschland. Philipp von Zabern, Mainz 2004, pp. 177–186.
- Lund, Helene S. (1992). Lysimachus. A Study in Early Hellenistic Kingship. Taylor & Francis Ltd. ISBN 978-0415070614.
- Sîrbu, Valeriu (2006). "Elitele geţilor dintre Carpaţi şi Balcani (sec. IV-II a. Chr): 'prinţii de aur şi argint'". Istros. XIII: 41–70.
- Stoyanov, T.; Mihaylova, Zh. (1996). "Metalworking in the Getic City in Sboryanovo locality near Isperih, NE Bulgaria (Preliminary report)". Ephemeris Napocensis. 6: 55–77.
