= Ostrusha mound =

Ancient burial site in Shipka, Bulgaria

Coordinates: 42°41′24.4″N 25°21′4.5″E

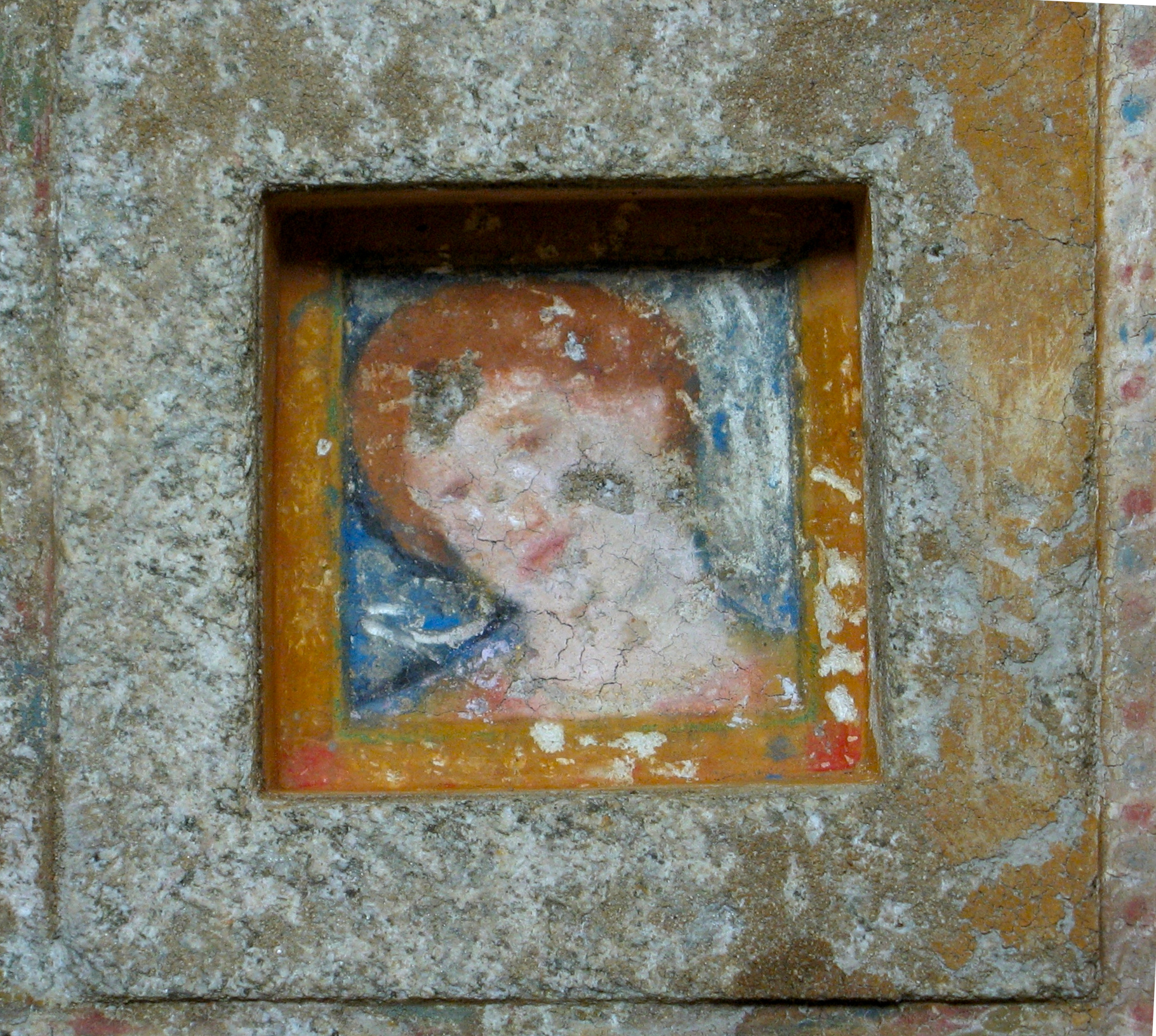
View of a woman's face in the central chamber

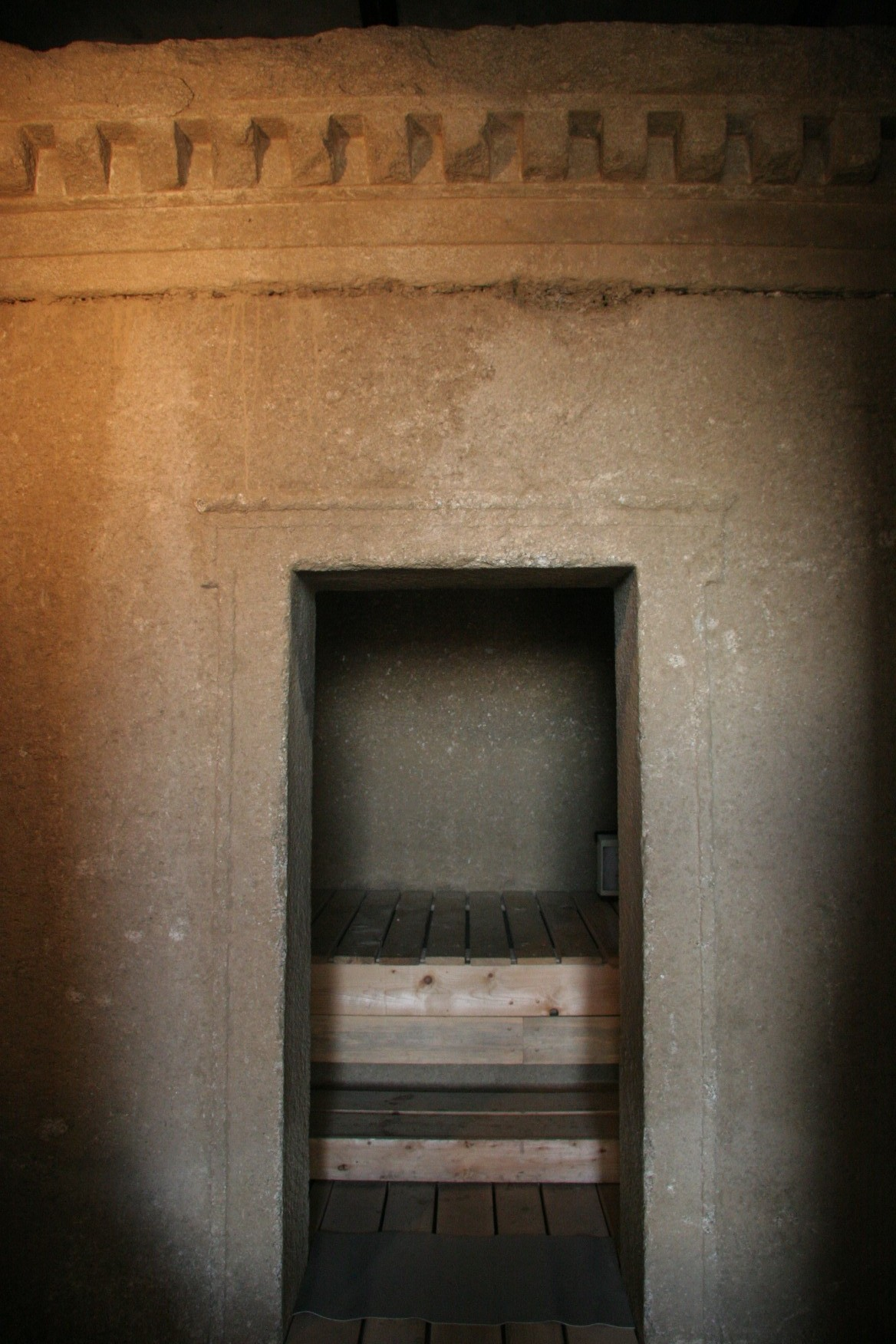
Entrance of the monolithic central chamber

The Ostrusha mound is a Thracian burial tumulus near the Bulgarian town of Shipka. It was constructed in the middle of the 4th century BCE. The stone structures under the more than 18 meters high mound form one of the biggest representative tomb-cult complexes with 6 rooms on an area of 100 square meters. It was professionally excavated in 1993.

One of the chambers is fully maintained. It is made of two carved-out solid granite blocks, weighing a total of more than 60 tons. The roof block is divided into dozens of square and circle shaped niches filled with masterfully painted portraits, scenes with people, fighting between animals, plants and geometric decorations. Most of the frescoes are severely damaged apart from a portrait of a young noble woman. A horse with full set of silver appliques as well as a gilded armor collar and two silver vessels were found in one of the other rooms that was not robbed in antiquity.

== See also ==
- Thracian tomb of Aleksandrovo
- Thracian tomb of Cotys I (Mogilan mound)
- Thracian tomb Golyama Arsenalka
- Thracian tomb Griffins
- Thracian Tomb of Kazanlak
- Thracian tomb Helvetia
- Thracian tomb of Seuthes III
- Thracian tomb Shushmanets
- Thracian Tomb of Sveshtari
- Valley of the Thracian Rulers
- Roman Tomb (Silistra)
