= Gold wreaths from Thrace =

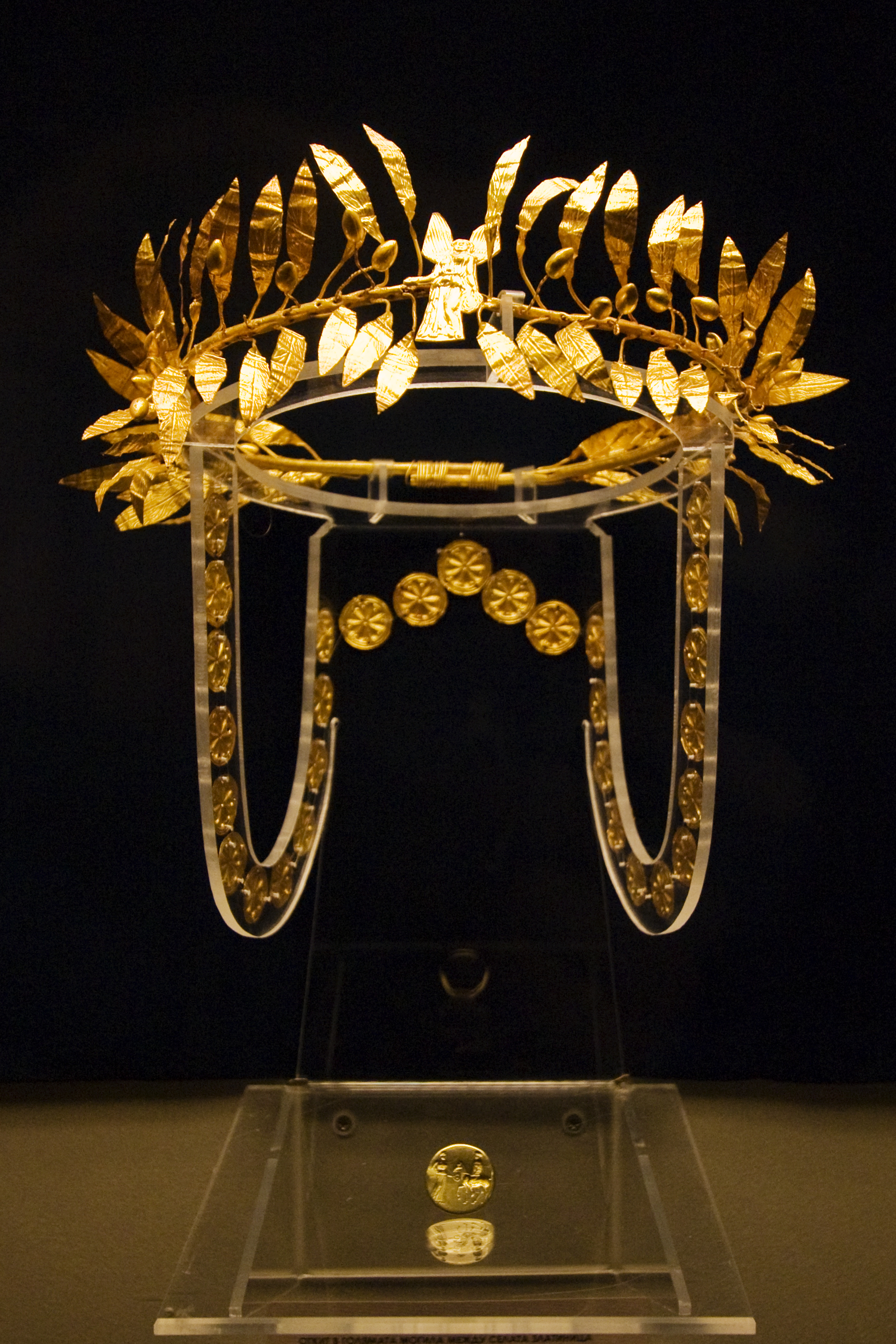
A gold wreath and gold ring from the burial of an Odrysian aristocrat, the central figure of the wreath is Nike wearing a peplos on top of a chiton and the ring features a woman accompanied by a horse and rider - National Museum of History, Sofia

The gold wreaths from Thrace are jewellery wreaths found in inner Thrace, which is within present day Bulgaria. The gold wreaths were found in the mounds and tombs of aristocrats at various locations in Thrace that have been dated to a period from the latter half of the fourth century and early part third century BC.

There have been only five or six such archaeological finds of Thracian gold wreaths in Bulgaria. Of those, two are in the National Museum of History in Sofia. The earliest gold laurel wreath of Thrace in the museum, also called the "Zlatinitsa-Malomirovo Treasure," was found at an old burial mound (tumulus) in Zlatinitsa, Elhovo Municipality, in Southeast Bulgaria.

The second wreath in the museum collection was donated in 2015, after it was found at an auction in the United States. Experts are unsure of its place of origin and its age because the scientific data normally recorded during a discovery does not exist. Initially, this wreath was dated to the first century BC, but later assessments by other archaeologists and experts on the culture date it to 1200 BC – 1300 BC. Similarities among wreaths found in Ancient Troy and the newly obtained wreath fueled a hypothesis that it might date to the time of the Trojan War.

== Location ==
The gold wreaths of inner Thrace were found along with other artifacts in tombs, tumuli or mounds at: Malomirovo-Zlatinitsa; Rozovets; tumuli at Mogilkite and Nenovetsi settlements; Vratsa, tomb ІІ of the Mogilan mound tumulus; Strelcha; Shipka; Tomb of Seuthes III tumulus; Kabyle; Ploska (Flat) tumulus; Resilovo; and Sozopol.

== History ==
The history of the Thracians is traced to an ethno-cultural group of Indo-European tribes that lived in Southeast Europe. The culture existed from the middle of the second millennium BC to approximately the sixth century AD, encompassing an area including parts of present-day Bulgaria, Romania, Moldova, Greece, Turkey, Macedonia and Serbia. Some of these tribes joined to form a kingdom known as the Odrysian Kingdom, which covered the present territory of Bulgaria, Northern Greece, Southeastern Romania and Northwestern Turkey. The dominant tribe of this group was the Odrysians, also called Odrysea or Odrusai, that derived its name from the mythological names of Odryses or Odrisis, (715 – 650 AD). King Teres founded the dynasty during the fifth century BC. His kingdom was the dominant state among the Thracian tribes until it was conquered in 46 AD by the Romans. In 360 BC the Odrysian king who ruled in Thrace was Cersobleptes, son of Cotys I.

During excavations in the tombs and mounds of Odrysians, gold wreaths of warriors and elite members of the tribes were unearthed from the later part of the fourth century BC and the first quarter of the third century BC. No wreaths have been uncovered anywhere in Thrace that date to the period from the third to the early second century BC. From the first century BC to the first century AD, wreaths reemerged among finds and are in evidence in Thracian tombs in Anchialos (the present day Pomorie) on the Pontic coast. From the first century AD to the second century AD, examples have been found in Chatalka, Karanovo, Belozem, Vize, Kardzali, Tulovo and Madretsdi; they were distributed in Southeast Thrace on the shores of the Struma River.( During the first century AD wreaths were found in tombs of aristocrats, which also evidence gifts as well as the gold wreaths.

== Typology ==
There are two types of gold wreaths from inner Thrace. One is made entirely of gold, and is designed with two twigs connected with a circular band. In the second type, only the leaves are fashioned of gold while the connecting rings are made of biodegradable materials. The wreaths of the second type typically use laurel, olive and oak leaf designs, though one specimen was found with ivy leaves, similar to the types made in the Greek culture. Unlike other areas of Thrace and Greece, to date, no evidence of the use of myrtle leaves have been found in inner Thrace.

Fragments of gold leaves have been found at Kabyle, the Ploska tumulus near Shipka, Rozovets in two different tomb complexes and at Strelcha. This may indicate that the rings were perishable, or that they were dismantled in rituals.

Wreaths of the first type, made entirely of gold, were found in various locations. Those at Malomirovo-Zlatinitsa that date to the fourth century BC have olive leaf motifs, as do those of a Strelcha wreath dated to the late fourth century BC. At Rozovets and Vratsa laurel wreaths that date to the last part of the fourth century BC were found. An oak leaf wreath found at the Golyamata tumulus near Shipka in the tomb of Seuthes III, is the only example of its kind found in inner Thrace to date, though similar oak leaf motifs are found on examples from Macedonia. A sole example of ivy leaves was discovered at Resilovo in a grave, dating to the late fourth century BC.

The gold wreaths were probably made in local workshops in inner Thrace and were modeled on Greek jewelry. They belong to the classic type dated to the second half of the fourth century BC and early third century BC. They were designed to be true imitations of the plant species.

The wreaths served multiple functions. Some were in vogue in daily fashion, indicating one's status among the elite classes. Other wreaths served in funerary rituals or for other ceremonial purposes, as depicted in artworks and on coins from the period, indicating that the symbolism of wreaths was widely used on vessels and helmets. Wreaths made of clay or gilt-bronze have also been found.

== Wreaths in the National Museum of History in Sofia ==
The National Museum of History in Sofia currently has two gold wreaths from inner Thrace, one found in a burial mound at Zlatinitsa in Southeastern Bulgaria. The mound included "a gold wreath with appliqués, a seal ring, a greav, and two silver rhyta," which a team of archaeologists headed by Daniela Agre found in 2005, the tomb of a Thracian ruler dating to the middle of the fourth century BC.

A second Thracian gold wreath added to the exhibit was probably smuggled out of the country to the U.S. via the thriving Bulgarian treasure hunting and smuggling trade. In 2015, Dobromir Petkov, a Bulgarian collector, tracked the piece and purchased it from a U.S. antiques auction center. With due legal documentation, he donated the item to Bulgaria's National Museum of History in Sofia. Though the exact location where it was unearthed is unknown, experts think the wreath originated in Southern Bulgaria. Some archaeologists initially dated the wreath to the first century BC. Other experts on the culture propose a date ranging from 1200 to 1300 BC, the time of the Trojan War, because of similarities in design to comparable wreaths from Ancient Troy. The ring linking the gold leaves is in the form of a circular branch, resembling specimens found in Troy, which had known ties to Thrace. Archaeologists Gavrail Lazov, Elka Penkova, and Lyubava Konova of the National Museum of History, have assessed the gold laurel wreath as likely to have been from the grave of an aristocrat belonging to the line of the last rulers of Ancient Thracia. Most likely it is from the Odrysian Kingdom of the fifth to first century BC and experts have valued the artifact to be worth approximately USD 100,000.

== See also ==
- Thracian treasure

== Bibliography ==
- Tonkova, Milena (2013). "Gold Wreaths From Thrace". Brașov County History Museum, Museum Of Brăila.
