= Getic burial complex =

Archaeological site in Razgrad Province, Bulgaria

The Getic burial complex is an archaeological site near Sveshtari in Razgrad Province in Bulgaria. Various artifacts have been recovered from a Thracian tomb which dates from the beginning of the third century BC. Another tomb, the Omurtag mount, has been linked to Cothelas, king of the Getae. It is in the same area as the world heritage site Tomb of Sveshtari.
