= Georgi Kitov =

Bulgarian archaeologist (1943–2008)

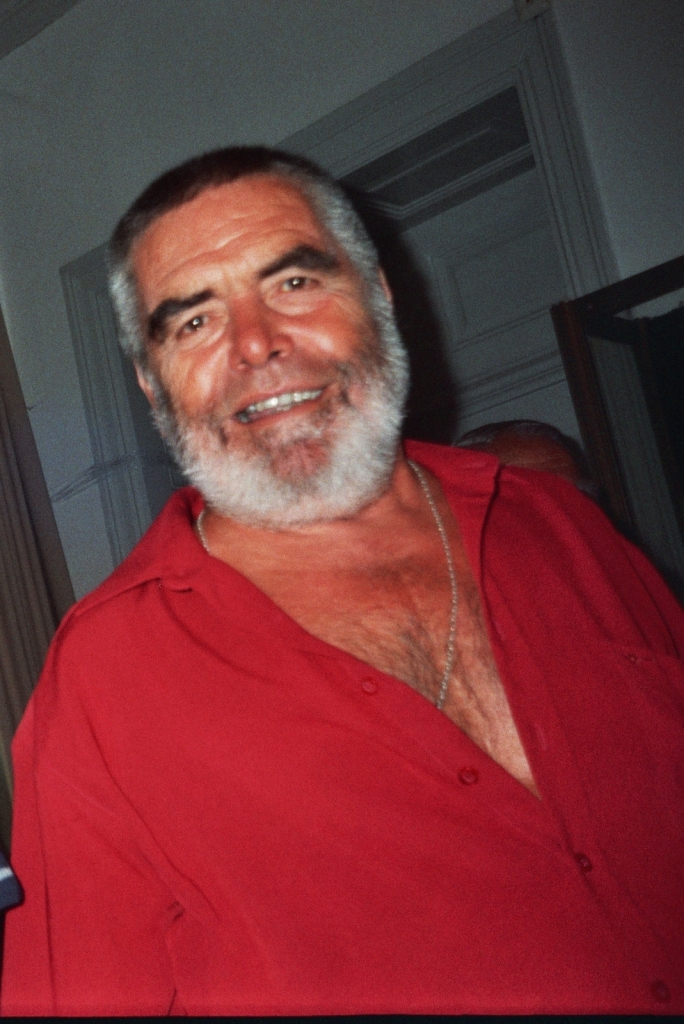
- Born: March 1943; Dupnica, Bulgaria
- Died: 14 September 2008 (aged 65); Starosel, Bulgaria
- Occupation: Archaeologist

Georgi Kitov (Bulgarian: Георги Китов) (1 March 1943 – 14 September 2008) was a Bulgarian archaeologist and thracologist. He specialized in Thracian archaeology. He participated in the excavations of many sites including the Alexandrovo Tomb, Kosmatka, Svetitzata and Starosel Cult Complex.

Kitov died from a heart attack on 14 September 2008 during excavations in Starosel, Bulgaria.

== Finding the Thracian tomb ==
On 19 August 2004 Kitov discovered a gold mask in a 5th-century BC burial mound outside the town of Shipka in a place he later named Golyamata Kosmatka. On 21 September he began an excavation of the mound with 12 others, including private security guards, and soon unearthed a large bronze head. Three days later he found the entrance to a tomb.

Instead of the more usual archaeological methods, Kitov used three large earthmoving machines. He claimed that he had to work quickly to deter looters. On 4 October Kitov and his team found a large marble door. Later that night they entered a chamber with a sarcophagus and a large number of golden objects.

According to Kitov's later account, he informed the police in Kazanluk to ask for help of couple of police officers to help the take the treasure to his headquarters in a local hotel. Police sent 50 men and a local prosecutor—according to their later report, they were suspicious because the team intended to move the artifacts in the middle of the night.

Police officers proceeded to frisk everyone when they came from the tomb in case they were trying to smuggle out valuables. When the police demanded that the treasure be taken to the local police station, Kitov refused. Both groups spent the whole night outside the mound until the police escorted the team and the artifacts to their hotel the next morning. Apparent police overkill caused lots of public amusement.

== Professional criticism ==
He rarely bothered to document or analyze the artifacts he fоund. He began to publish his findings only after several other archaeologists criticised him in public. He excavated the digs in a hurried manner, using heavy machinery. The quality of his scholarship, his business ethics, his self-promotion and his associations with people suspected of looting and selling antiquities were issues on which he was criticized.

In February 2001, the National Archaeological Institute and Museum censured him for excavating sites without permission and took away his authorization to lead expeditions for a year. Later the same year, they expelled Kitov from his post as a Thracian section.

== Author ==
Kitov was the author or co-author of about 17 books of which the following are available in English:

- The Valley of the Thracian Rulers by Georgi Kitov, 2005
- Thracian Treasures from Bulgaria by Maria Reho, Pavlina Ilieva, Georgi Kitov, Daniela Agre, 2006
- The Valley of the Thracian Kings by Georgi Kitov, I︠U︡lii︠a︡na Tomova, 2006
- Thracian Cult Center near Starossel by Georgi Kitov
- The Panagyurishte Treasure by Georgi Kitov
