= Galiche Rock =

Island in the South Shetland Islands

- Location of Robert Island in the South Shetland Islands

- Location within Antarctica Location within Antarctic Peninsula

Geography
- Location: Antarctica
- Coordinates: 62°23′43″S 59°20′53″W
- Archipelago: South Shetland Islands

Administration
- Administered under the Antarctic Treaty System

Demographics
- Population: Uninhabited

Galiche Rock (Bulgarian: скала Галиче, ‘Skala Galiche’ \ska-'la 'ga-li-che\) is the large rock off Somovit Point on the east coast of Robert Island in the South Shetland Islands, Antarctica. It is extending 300 m (328 yd) in northwest-southeast direction and 180 m (197 yd) in northeast-southwest direction, and forming the south side of the entrance to Kruni Cove and the north side of the entrance to Tsepina Cove.

The rock is named after the settlement of Galiche in Northwestern Bulgaria.

== Location ==
Galiche Rock is located 150 m (164 yd) northeast of Somovit Point, 780 m (853 yd) south of Kitchen Point and 900 m (984 yd) north of Batuliya Point. British mapping in 1968 and Bulgarian in 2009.

== See also ==
- Composite Antarctic Gazetteer
- List of Antarctic and sub-Antarctic islands
- List of Antarctic islands south of 60° S
- SCAR
- Territorial claims in Antarctica

== Maps ==
- L.L. Ivanov. Antarctica: Livingston Island and Greenwich, Robert, Snow and Smith Islands. Scale 1:120000 topographic map. Troyan: Manfred Wörner Foundation, 2009. ISBN 978-954-92032-6-4
