= Alepu Rocks =

Islands in the South Shetland Islands

- Location of Robert Island in the South Shetland Islands.

- Location within Antarctica Location within Antarctic Peninsula

Geography
- Location: Antarctica
- Coordinates: 62°23′04″S 59°20′37″W
- Archipelago: South Shetland Islands

Administration
- Administered under the Antarctic Treaty System

Demographics
- Population: Uninhabited

Alepu Rocks (Bulgarian: скали Алепу, ‘Skali Alepu’ \ska-'li a-le-'pu\) is the group of rocks off the east coast of Robert Island in the South Shetland Islands, Antarctica, situated in an area with a diameter of 380 m (416 yd).

The rocks are named after the seaside locality of Alepu in Southeastern Bulgaria.

== Location ==
Alepu Rocks are centred at 62°23′04″S 59°20′37″W, which is 330 m (361 yd) north-northeast of Kitchen Point and 1.36 km (0.85 mi) southeast of Perelik Point. British mapping in 1968 and Bulgarian in 2009.

== See also ==
- Composite Antarctic Gazetteer
- List of Antarctic and sub-Antarctic islands
- List of Antarctic islands south of 60° S
- SCAR
- Territorial claims in Antarctica

== Map ==
- L.L. Ivanov. Antarctica: Livingston Island and Greenwich, Robert, Snow and Smith Islands. Scale 1:120000 topographic map. Troyan: Manfred Wörner Foundation, 2009. ISBN 978-954-92032-6-4
