= Somovit Point =

Location of Robert Island in the South Shetland Islands.

Topographic map of Livingston Island, Greenwich, Robert, Snow and Smith Islands.

Somovit Point (Bulgarian: нос Сомовит, ‘Nos Somovit’ \'nos 'so-mo-vit\) is a point on the east coast of Robert Island in the South Shetland Islands, Antarctica projecting 500 m into Bransfield Strait between Kruni Cove and Tsepina Cove.

It is situated 900 m north-northwest of Batuliya Point and 1.1 km south-southwest of Kitchen Point.

The point is named after the settlement of Somovit in northern Bulgaria.

== Location ==
Somovit Point is located at 62°23′49″S 59°21′04″W. Bulgarian mapping in 2009.

== Maps ==
- L.L. Ivanov. Antarctica: Livingston Island and Greenwich, Robert, Snow and Smith Islands. Scale 1:120000 topographic map. Troyan: Manfred Wörner Foundation, 2009. ISBN 978-954-92032-6-4
