= Kosovo, Plovdiv Province =

Kosovo Косово
- Village
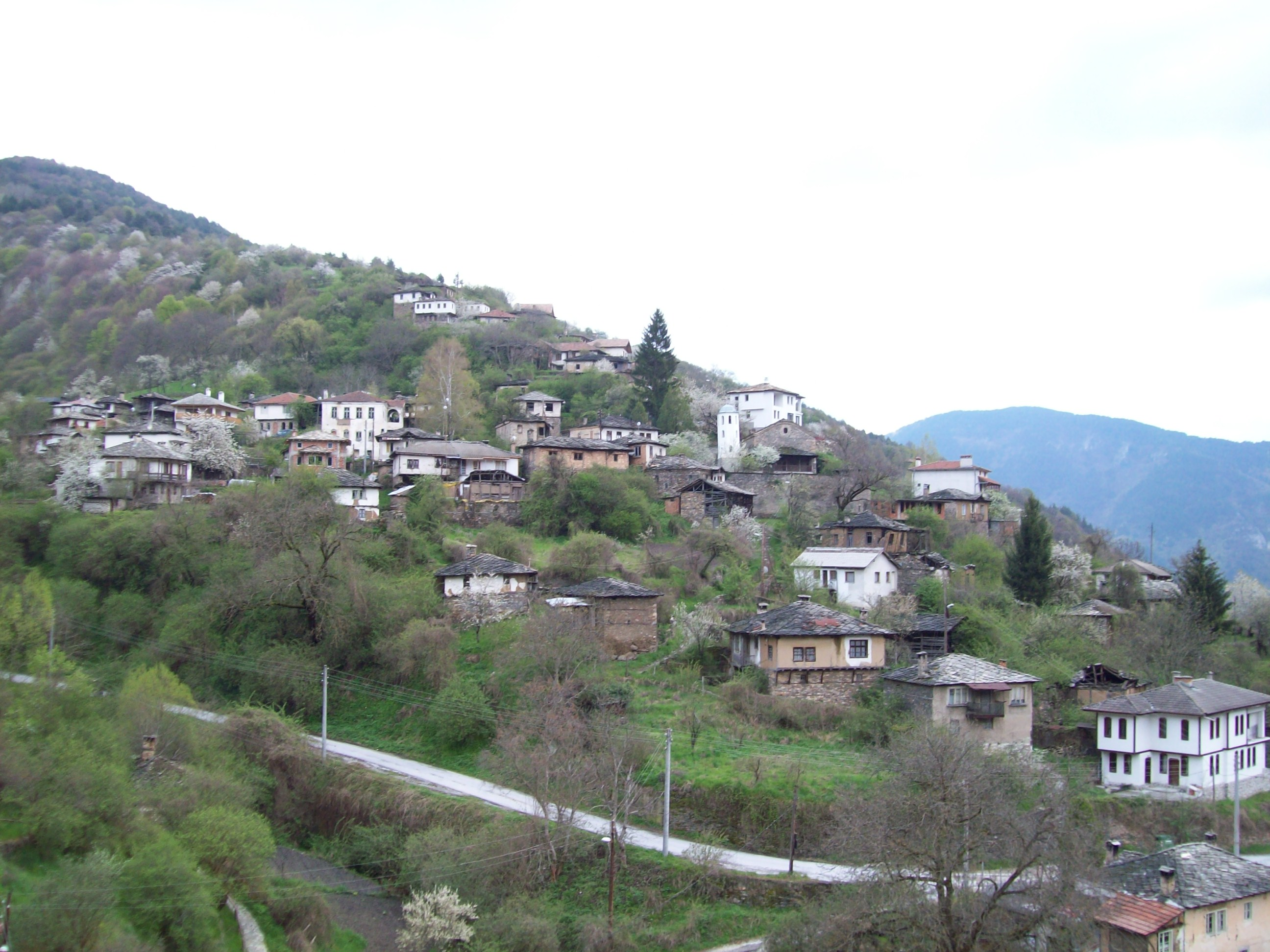

- Location of Kosovo
- Coordinates: 41.917°N 24.700°E
- Country: Bulgaria
- Oblast: Plovdiv
- Obshtina: Asenovgrad

Government
  - Mayor (Municipality): Hristo Grudev (GERB)

Area
  - Total: 28.449 km^{2} (10.984 sq mi)
- Elevation: 860 m (2,820 ft)

Population (2024)
  - Total: 26
  - Density: 0.91/km^{2} (2.4/sq mi)
- Postal code: 4240
- Area code: 03342
- Vehicle registration: РВ

Kosovo (Bulgarian: Косово) is a village in Plovdiv Province, southern Bulgaria. It has 26 inhabitants as of 2024.

== Geography ==
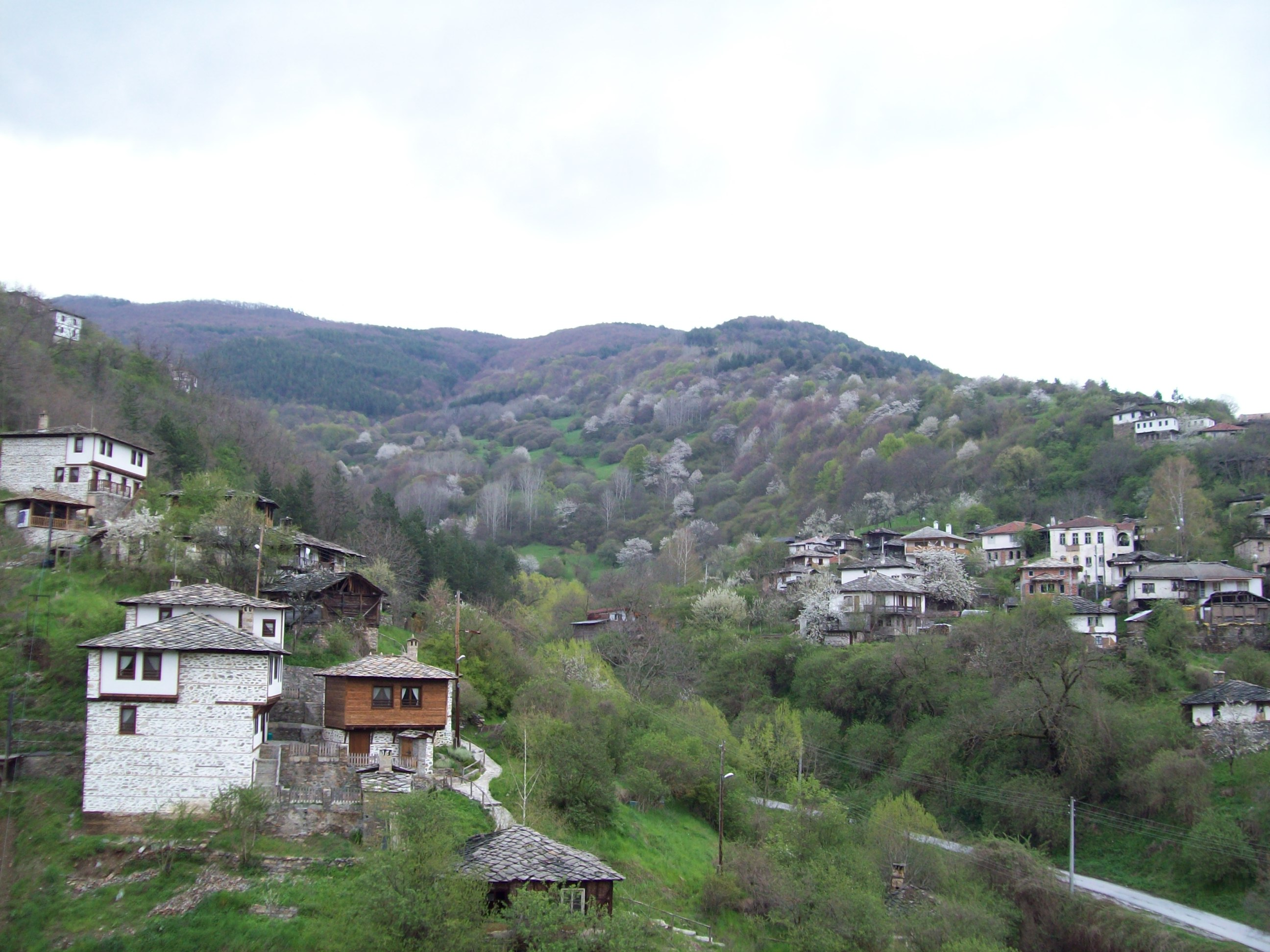
A view of Kosovo in early spring

Kosovo is located in the northern part of the central Rhodope Mountains on slopes overlooking the valley of the river Chepelarska reka of the Maritsa drainage, surrounded by untouched nature. There are four streams running though its neighbourhood.

Administratively, it is situated in Asenovgrad Municipality in the southern part of Plovdiv Province. The village has a territory of 28.449 km^{2}. It is accessible via a road that diverts from the second class II-86 road that links the city of Plovdiv with Smolyan and other settlements in the Rhodope Mountains. The closest settlement is the spa village Narechenski Bani situated 5 km southeast of Kosovo. The distance from the municipal center Asenovgrad is 30 km, the provincial center Plovdiv is 50 km away, and the ski resort of Pamporovo lies some 36 km to the south.

== History and landmarks ==
Kosovo was settled in the 17th century by settlers from Staro Selo near White Church Monastery. Its pinnacle was in the late 19th century, and houses from this age still remain today. Kosovo has typical Rhodope architecture of the Bulgarian National Revival and most of its streets are covered with cobblestone. It has 63 cultural monuments, of which five have national significance. Among the principal monuments are the Church of the Ascension of 1851 and the House of Hadzhi Stanchovski of 1853, who was the architect of several building in the Old Town of Plovdiv. Other buildings of interest include the old school of 1889, the chapels of St Nedelya and St Peter, the mill, etc.

In the 2011 the Ministry of Economy launched an initiative to promote tourism in 50 sites around the country and the village of Kosovo was among them. Tourism is the most important economic activity in the village with several guest houses and other establishments. Almost half of the tourists are foreigners.
