= Sadala Point =

Headland on Robert Island in Antarctica

Location of Robert Island in the South Shetland Islands.

Topographic map of Livingston Island, Greenwich, Robert, Snow and Smith Islands.

Sadala Point (Bulgarian: нос Садала, ‘Nos Sadala’ \'nos sa-'da-la\) is a point on the southeast coast of Robert Island in the South Shetland Islands, Antarctica, projecting 500 m into Bransfield Strait. It is 2.43 km northeast of the southeast extremity of Robert Point, 2.97 km south-southwest of Batuliya Point and 4.8 km south-southwest of Kitchen Point.

The point is named after King Sadala of Thrace, 87–79 BC.

== Location ==
Sadala Point is located at 62°25′46.8″S 59°21′48″W. Bulgarian mapping in 2009 and 2010.

== Maps ==
- L. L. Ivanov. Antarctica: Livingston Island and Greenwich, Robert, Snow and Smith Islands. Scale 1:120000 topographic map. Troyan: Manfred Wörner Foundation, 2009. ISBN 978-954-92032-6-4
