= Asenovgrad Municipality =

Coordinates: 42°1′N 24°52′E

Asenovgrad Municipality Община Асеновград
- Flag Coat of arms

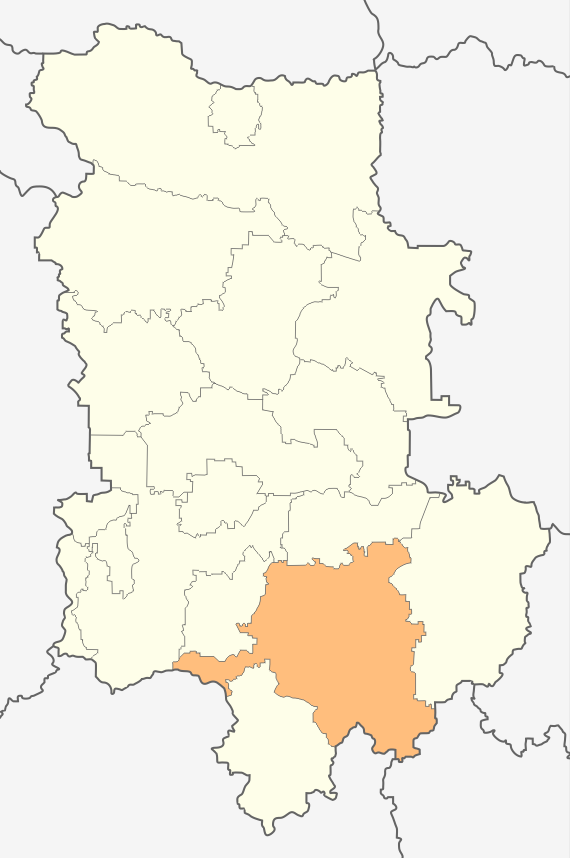
- Country: Bulgaria
- Province: Plovdiv Province
- Seat: Asenovgrad

Area
  - Total: 665.4 km^{2} (256.9 sq mi)

Population (2024)
  - Total: 56,859
  - Density: 85.45/km^{2} (221.3/sq mi)
- Website: www.asenovgrad.bg

Asenovgrad Municipality (Bulgarian: Община Асеновград) is a municipality in Plovdiv Province, central Bulgaria. Covering a territory of 665.4 km^{2}, it is the second largest of the 18 municipalities in the province, encompassing 10.3% of its total area. It borders the municipalities of Kuklen to the northwest, Rodopi and Sadovo to the north, Parvomay to the east, Chernoochene to the southeast, Banite to the south, Laki to the southwest, and Chepelare and again Rodopi to the west.

The municipal seat Asenovgrad is the second largest town in the province. It lies 19 km south of Plovdiv and 180 km southeast of the national capital Sofia.

== Geography ==
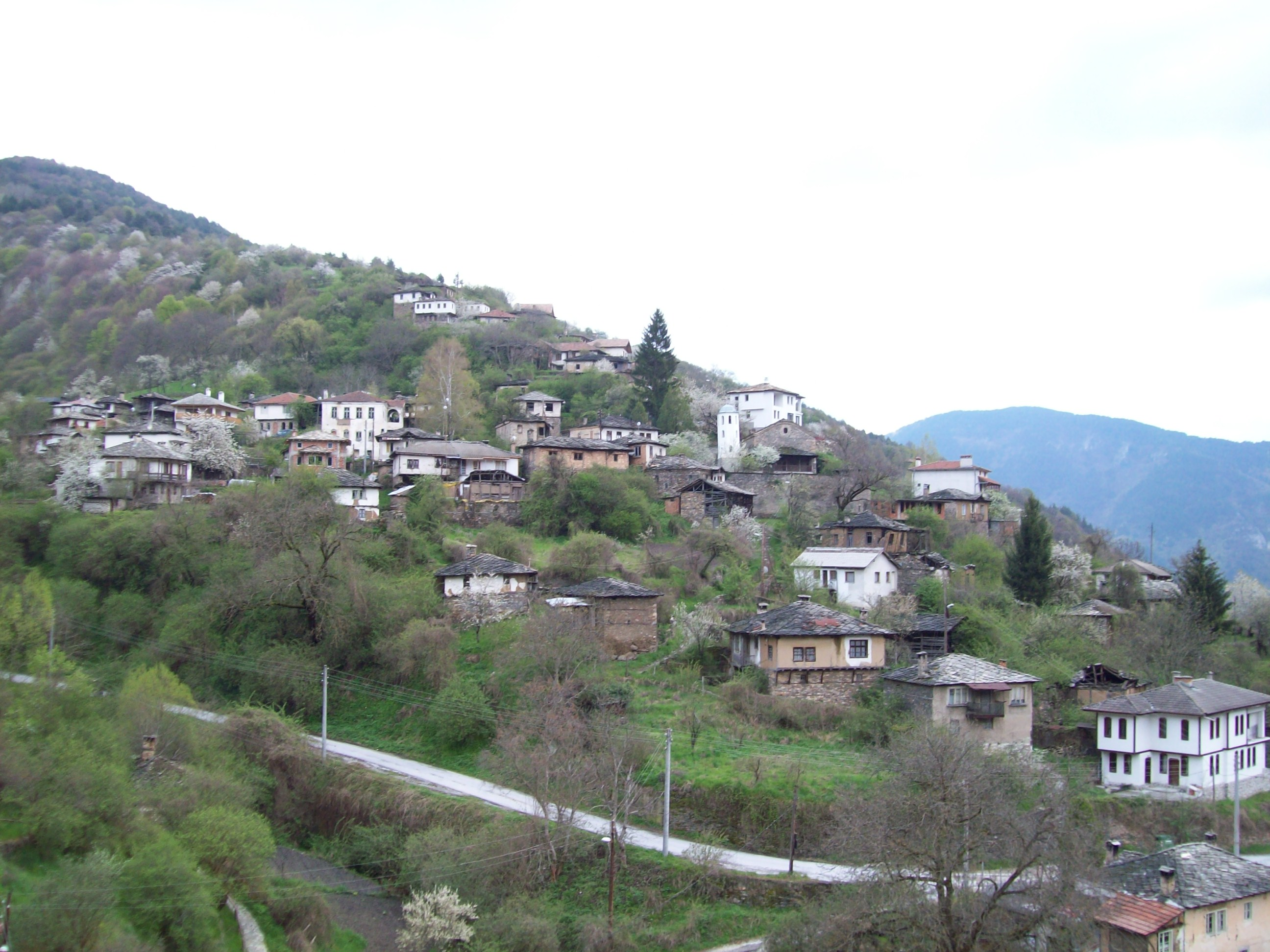
The village of Kosovo

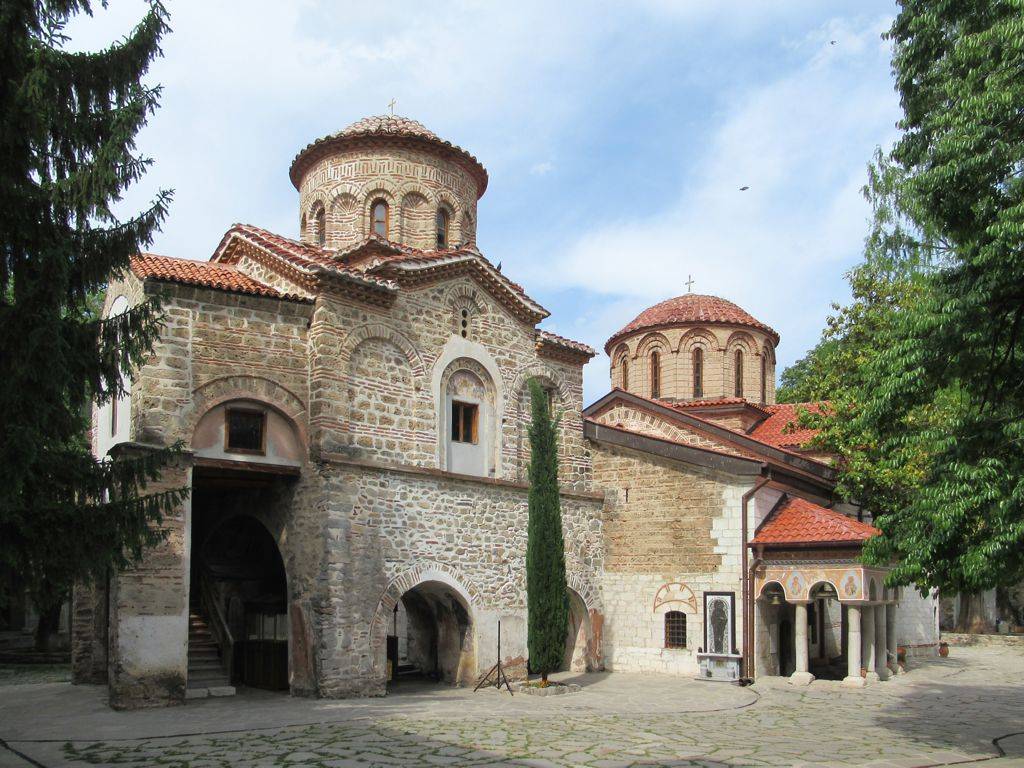
One of the churches of the Bachkovo Monastery

The topography is varied from flat to the north through hilly and mountainous to the south. The northern part lies within the southern reaches of the Upper Thracian Plain, where lowest point at 161 m is located north of the village of Konush at the border with Sadovo Municipality. To the east are the southwesternmost parts of the Haskovo hilly zone, where the elevation varies between 200 m and 400 m. To the south rise the northern slopes of the Rhodope Mountains with three major orographic units — west of the deep valley of the Chepelarska reka are the northeasternmost reaches of the Chernatitsa ridge. East of the river is the Dobrostan ridge, whose northeastern slopes descend steeply towards the lowlands, while to the south it connects to the Sini Vrah ridge of the Perelik–Prespa division of the mountain range. In the latter, rising in the southernmost limits of the municipality, is its highest point, the summit of Progled (1,576 m).

Asenovgrad Municipality falls within the transitional continental climatic zone with strong mountainous influence to the south. In its western part flows a 35 km section of the river Chepelarska reka, a right tributary of the Maritsa of the Aegean Sea basin. It runs in a deep forested valley and is the main water artery of the municipality. Further east are two smaller rights tributaries of the Maritsa, the Cherkezitsa and the Mechka. In the south flows the Sushitsa, part of the Chepelarska reka river system.

== Landmarks ==
There are numerous natural and cultural landmarks in the municipality. In its central–western part lies the important Chervenata Stena Reserve, which protects the dramatic landscape of the Dobrostan ridge along with numerous rare flora and fauna. There are numerous caves in the limestone of the Rhodopes, including the show cave Dobrostanski Biser. In the south is located the rock formation of Belintash, which had been an ancient Thracian sanctuary and supports a rich wildlife.

Asen's Fortress rising over the Chepelarska reka gorge just south of Asenovgrad, contains the well-preserved medieval Church of the Holy Mother of God. The city itself contains several museums, historical churches, such as St John the Baptist, and old houses. There are four monasteries in the municipality, including the Bachkovo Monastery, one of the most important and best preserved in Bulgaria. The other three are the Arapovo Monastery, Muldava Monastery and Gorni Voden Monastery.

== Transport ==
Asenovgrad Municipality is traversed by seven roads of the national network with a total length of 124 km, including the last 35.3 km of the second class II-58 road Chernoochene–Asenovgrad, a 34.3 km section of the second class II-86 road Plovdiv–Smolyan–Rudozem, the last 15.6 km of the third class III-667 road, the last 8.3 km of the third class III-804 road, the first 12.1 km of the third class III-5802 road, the last 4.5 km of the third class III-8006 road and the last 13.9 km of the third class III-8604 road. With the addition of the local roads, the total municipal network reaches 200 km, not including 210 km of streets in Asenovgrad and another 227 km in the villages.

In the northwestern part of its territory runs a 5.4 km section of railway line No. 19 Krumovo–Asenovgrad.

== Demography ==
The population is 56,859 as of 2024.

There are 28 villages and one town in Asenovgrad Municipality:

- Asenovgrad
- Bachkovo
- Bor
- Boyantsi
- Cherven
- Dobrostan
- Dolnoslav
- Gornoslav
- Izbeglii
- Izvorovo
- Kozanovo
- Konush
- Kosovo
- Lenovo
- Lyaskovo
- Mostovo
- Muldava
- Narechenski Bani
- Novakovo
- Novi Izvor
- Oreshets
- Patriarch Evtimovo
- Sini Vrah
- Stoevo
- Topolovo
- Tri Mogili
- Uzunovo
- Vrata
- Zhalt Kamak
- Zlatovrah

== Gallery ==
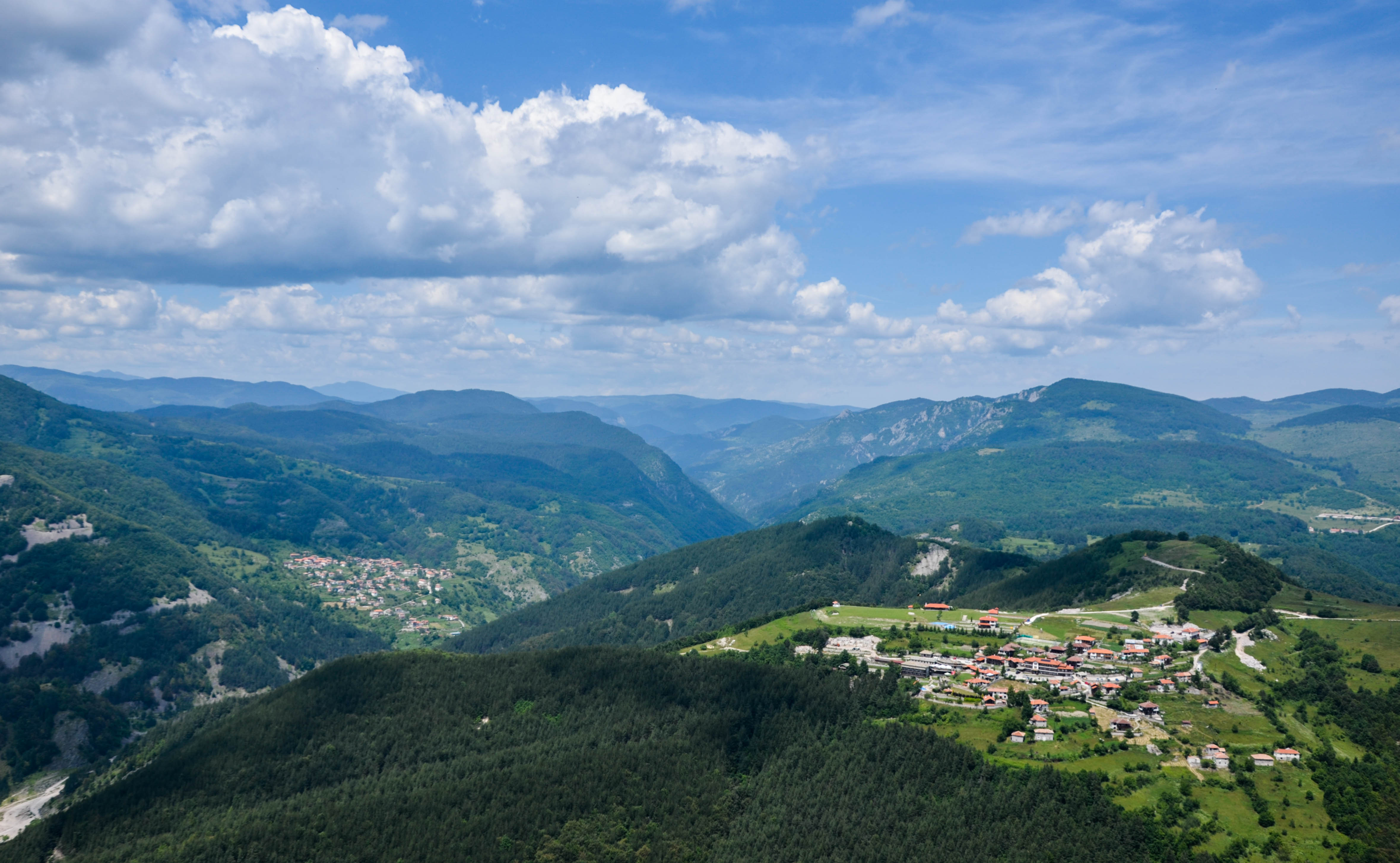
Sini Vrah seen from Belintash

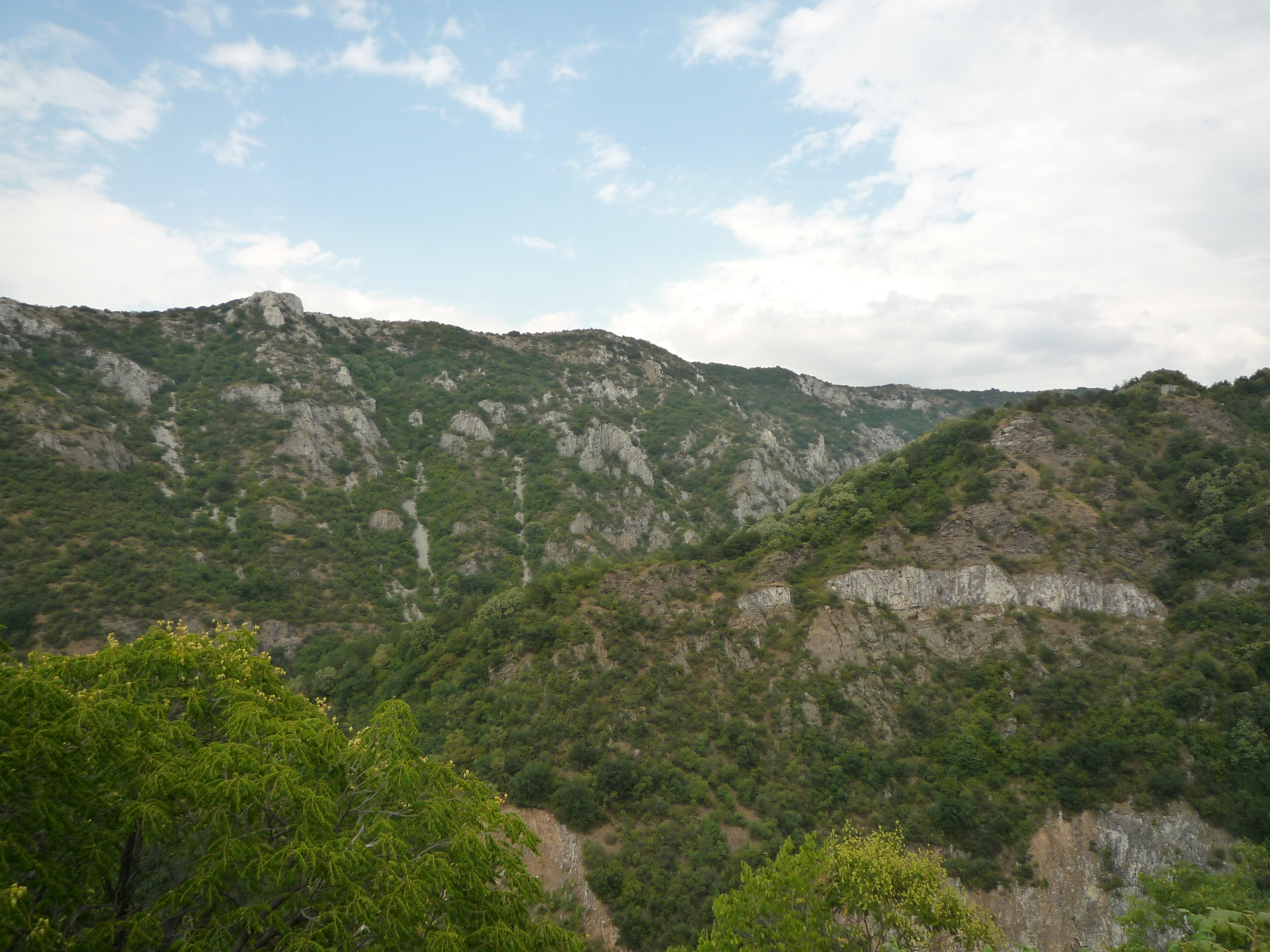
Rhodope Mountains near of Asenovgrad

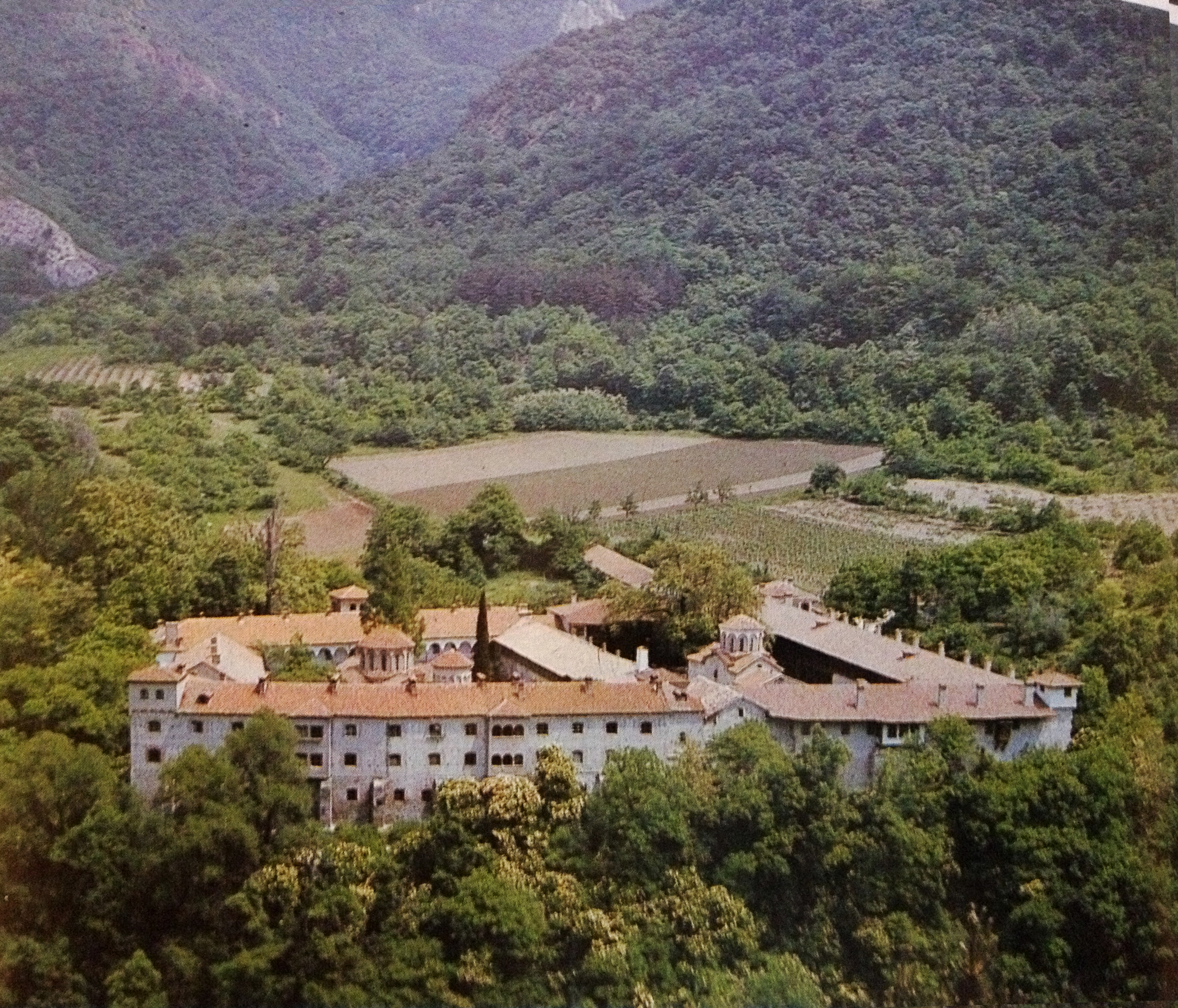
Bachkovo Monastery

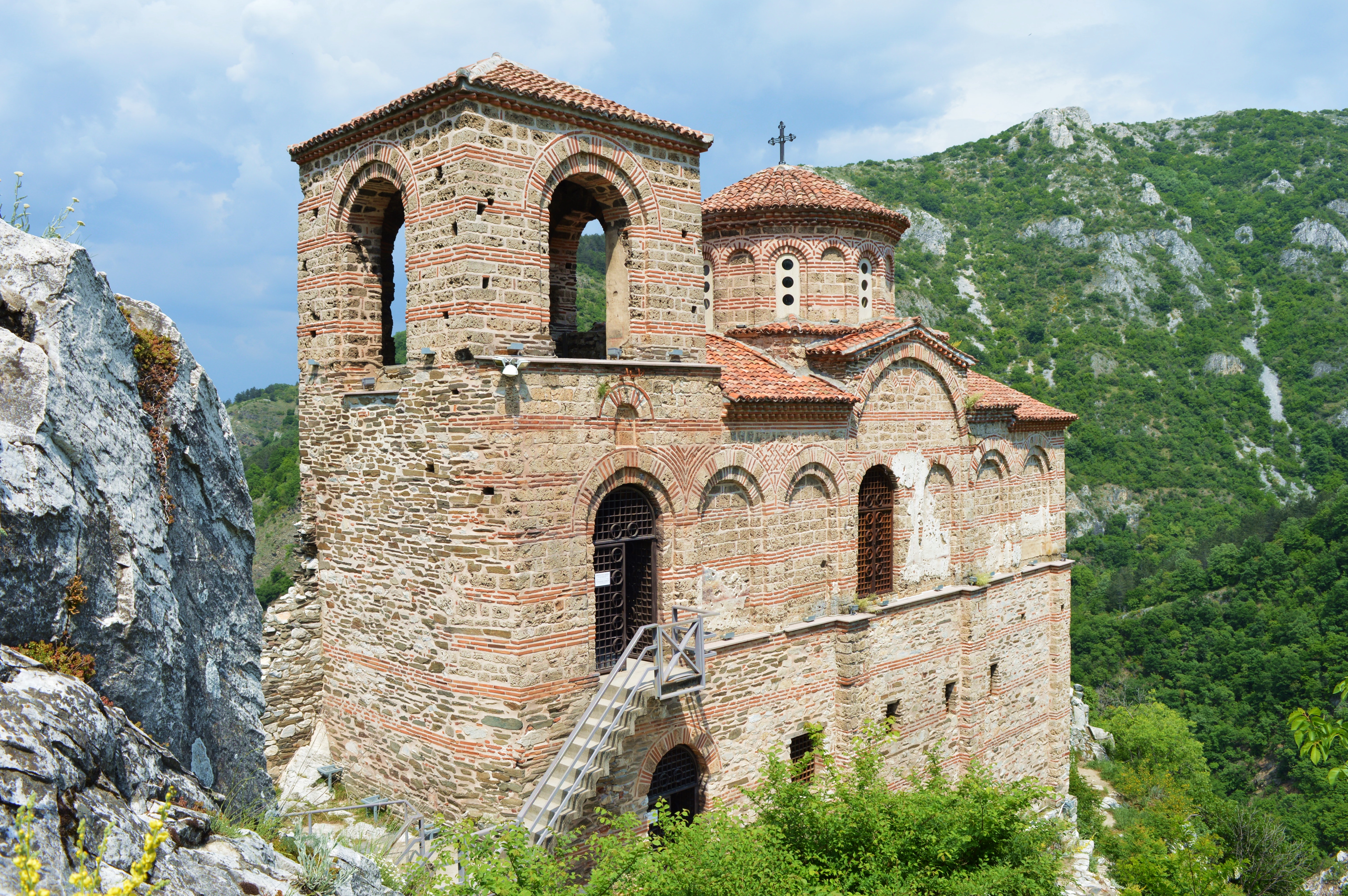
Church of the Holy Mother of God, Asen's Fortress
