= Tsepina Cove =

Cove of Robert Island

Location of Robert Island in the South Shetland Islands.

Topographic map of Livingston Island, Greenwich, Robert, Snow and Smith Islands.

Tsepina Cove (Bulgarian: залив Цепина, ‘Zaliv Tsepina’ \'za-liv 'tse-pi-na\) is the 1 km wide cove indenting for 850 m the east coast of Robert Island in the South Shetland Islands, Antarctica. It is entered south of Galiche Rock off Somovit Point, and north of Batuliya Point.

The feature is named after the medieval fortress of Tsepina in southern Bulgaria.

== Location ==
Tsepina Cove is located at 62°24′07″S 59°21′10″W. Bulgarian mapping in 2009.

== Maps ==
- L.L. Ivanov. Antarctica: Livingston Island and Greenwich, Robert, Snow and Smith Islands. Scale 1:120000 topographic map. Troyan: Manfred Wörner Foundation, 2009. ISBN 978-954-92032-6-4 (Updated second edition 2010. ISBN 978-954-92032-9-5)
- Antarctic Digital Database (ADD). Scale 1:250000 topographic map of Antarctica. Scientific Committee on Antarctic Research (SCAR). Since 1993, regularly upgraded and updated.
