= Golyam Perelik =

Mountain in Bulgaria

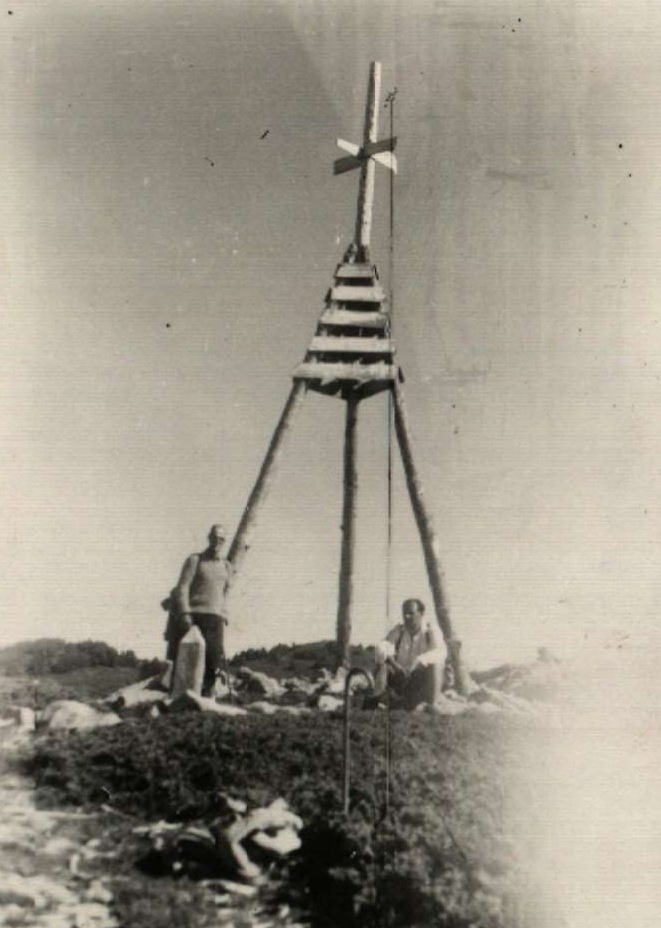
- Image from 1930-1931

Highest point
- Elevation: 2,191 m (7,188 ft)
- Prominence: 895 m (2,936 ft)
- Coordinates: 41°36′04″N 24°34′27″E

Geography
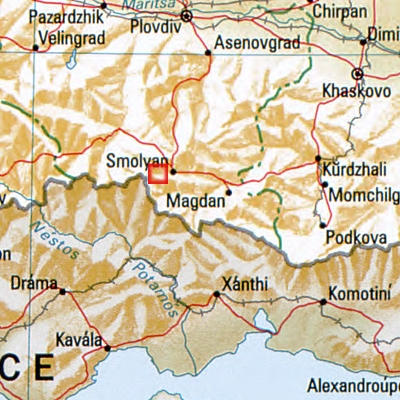
- Location: Smolyan Province, Bulgaria
- Parent range: Rhodope Mountains

Golyam Perelik (Bulgarian: Голям Перелик [ɡoˈʎam pɛrɛˈlik]) is the highest peak in the Rhodope Mountains, situated 19 km to the west of Smolyan. It makes the Rhodopes the seventh highest Bulgarian mountain range after Rila, Pirin, Stara Planina, Vitosha, Osogovo and Slavyanka. The peak is easily accessible, but currently cannot be climbed because a unit of the Bulgarian Army is stationed in its vicinity.

Perelik Point on Robert Island, South Shetland Islands is named after Golyam Perelik.
