= Kozloduy Cove =

Coordinates: 62°22′56″S 59°21′45″W

Location of Robert Island in the South Shetland Islands.

Topographic map of Livingston Island, Greenwich, Robert, Snow and Smith Islands.

Kozloduy Cove (Bulgarian: залив Козлодуй, romanized: zaliv Kozloduy, IPA: [ˈzalif kozɫoˈduj]) is a 1.4 km wide cove indenting for 1.25 km the east coast of Robert Island, South Shetland Islands between Kitchen Point and Perelik Point. Bulgarian early mapping in 2009. Named after the town of Kozloduy in northwestern Bulgaria.

== Map ==
- L.L. Ivanov. Antarctica: Livingston Island and Greenwich, Robert, Snow and Smith Islands. Scale 1:120000 topographic map. Troyan: Manfred Wörner Foundation, 2009. ISBN 978-954-92032-6-4
