= Belintash =

- Белинташ (Bulgarian)
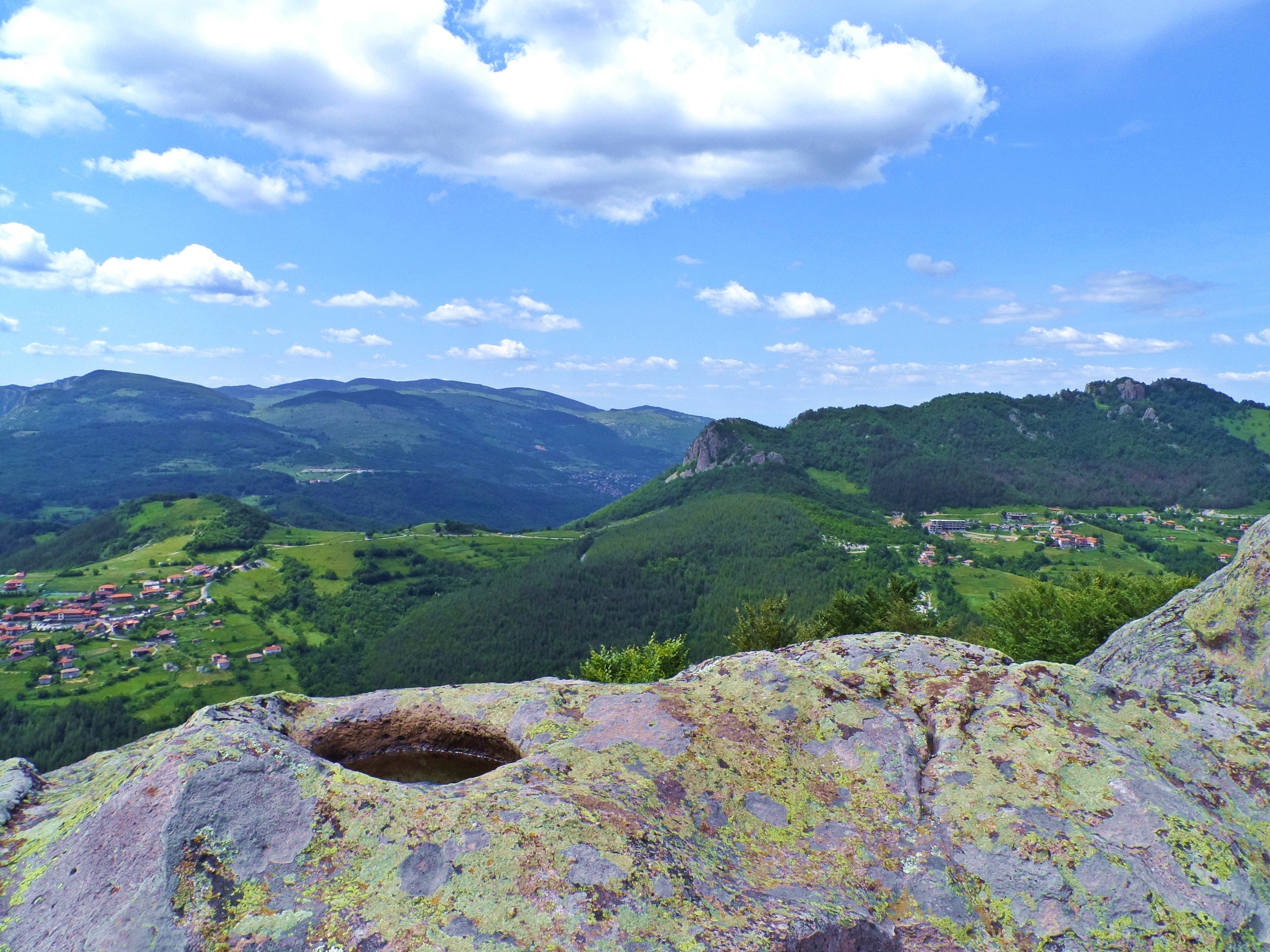
- A view from Belintash

- Location within Bulgaria
- 41°51′00″N 24°58′6″E
- Type: Rock sanctuary
- Location: Asenovgrad Municipality, Plovdiv Province, Bulgaria

Site notes
- Area: 2.3 ha (5.7 acres)
- Public access: free

Belintash (Bulgarian: Белинташ, pronounced as Belantash and Belǎntash in some local Bulgarian dialects) is a small plateau in the Rhodope Mountains in Bulgaria bearing traces of human activity. It is assumed that this is a cult site of the ancient Thracian, though the very essence and purpose are not yet fully understood. There are also suggestions that the sanctuary was dedicated to the god Sabazios (Ancient Greek: Σαβάζιος) built and operated by the independent Thracian tribe Bessi. The upper platform of the plateau is marked with carved round holes, trails, niches and steps that some researches interpret as stellar map. It is claimed by some Bulgarian media that in 2006, anonymous tourists had discovered the so-called "Inscription of Belintash" - a petroglyph carved into the rocks, which according to some theorists, confirm that the Thracians had their own alphabet that pre-dates Greek alphabet. However, the authenticity of the petroglyph has not yet been confirmed or denied by archaeologists working on the site of Belintash.

== Location ==
Administratively, it lies in Asenovgrad Municipality of Plovdiv Province. Belintash is situated on the ridge of Dobrostan in the central part of the Rhodopes Mountains. It is 3 km in the south of the village Vrata and 3 km in the south-west of the village of Sini Vruh. It is in central position in regard to a group of rock sanctuaries in the indicated above part of the mountain: Pitvoto, In Kaya, Turskata Kulya cromlech, Karadzhov Kamuk Arc and Haydushki Kamuk.

The plateau is a large rock elevation with a top area of about 5000sq.m., and south–north orientation of its longitudinal axis. Three areas – northern, central and southern – had formed on the plateau as a result of the rock sinking in most ancient times. The ancient Thracians cut in the north most part of the first area steps and niches of various sizes. Hundreds of round holes (about 300) are seen in the northern and central areas of the plateau, as well as two large "sterns" (used for sacrificial pits according to some theories) and cut in the rock beds for wooden beams. Two dug by treasure-hunters stone tumuli were discovered 500m in the north of the triangulation spot of Belintash. The tumuli mark the only way to the plateau and had been parts of a necropolis, the major part of which had been discovered.

== Discovery and research ==
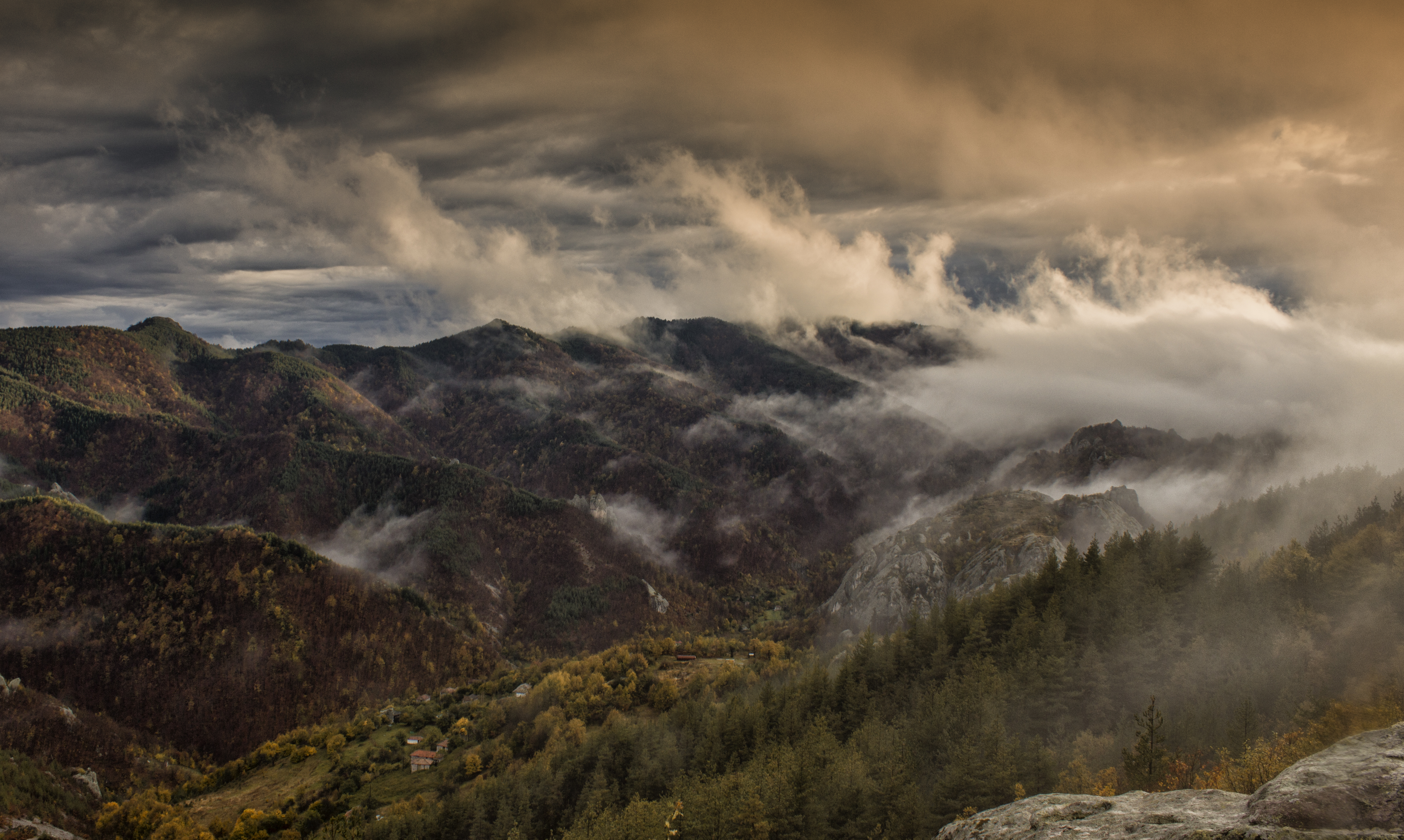
A view from Belintash in autumn

The first archaeological studies conducted on Belintash plateau by Bulgarian archaeologists Iveta Moreva - Arabova and Georgi Velev from Historical Museum of Asenovgrad (Bulgaria) took place in 1975.

The site had been studied during the 1980s by a team of Bulgarian archaeo-astronomers that made Belintash of interest in Bulgarian archaeology. According to the archaeo-astronomers the plateau was used as sanctuary used by ancient Thracians as well as a solar observatory – to satisfy the needs of certain agricultural and religious activities of society at the time.

A silver votive plate from Roman period with the representation of Dionysus-Sabazius was found among the rocks. It is kept now in the collections of Bulgarian National Institute of Archaeology with Museum at Bulgarian Academy of Sciences. According to Bulgarian archaeologist Ivan Hristov, the silver plate should be dated in an earlier epoch. A resemblance with a monument that was discovered in 2004 in the already famous tumulus of Svetitsata near the town of Shipka, Bulgaria gave a reason to this conclusion of Hristov. The above-mentioned monument is the gold mask of so-called Teres discovered by Bulgarian archaeologist Georgi Kitov and has almost identical facial features with those of the male figure on the silver plate found among the megalithic rocks in the base of the Belintash plateau.
