= Sadovo =

Sadovo Садово
- Town
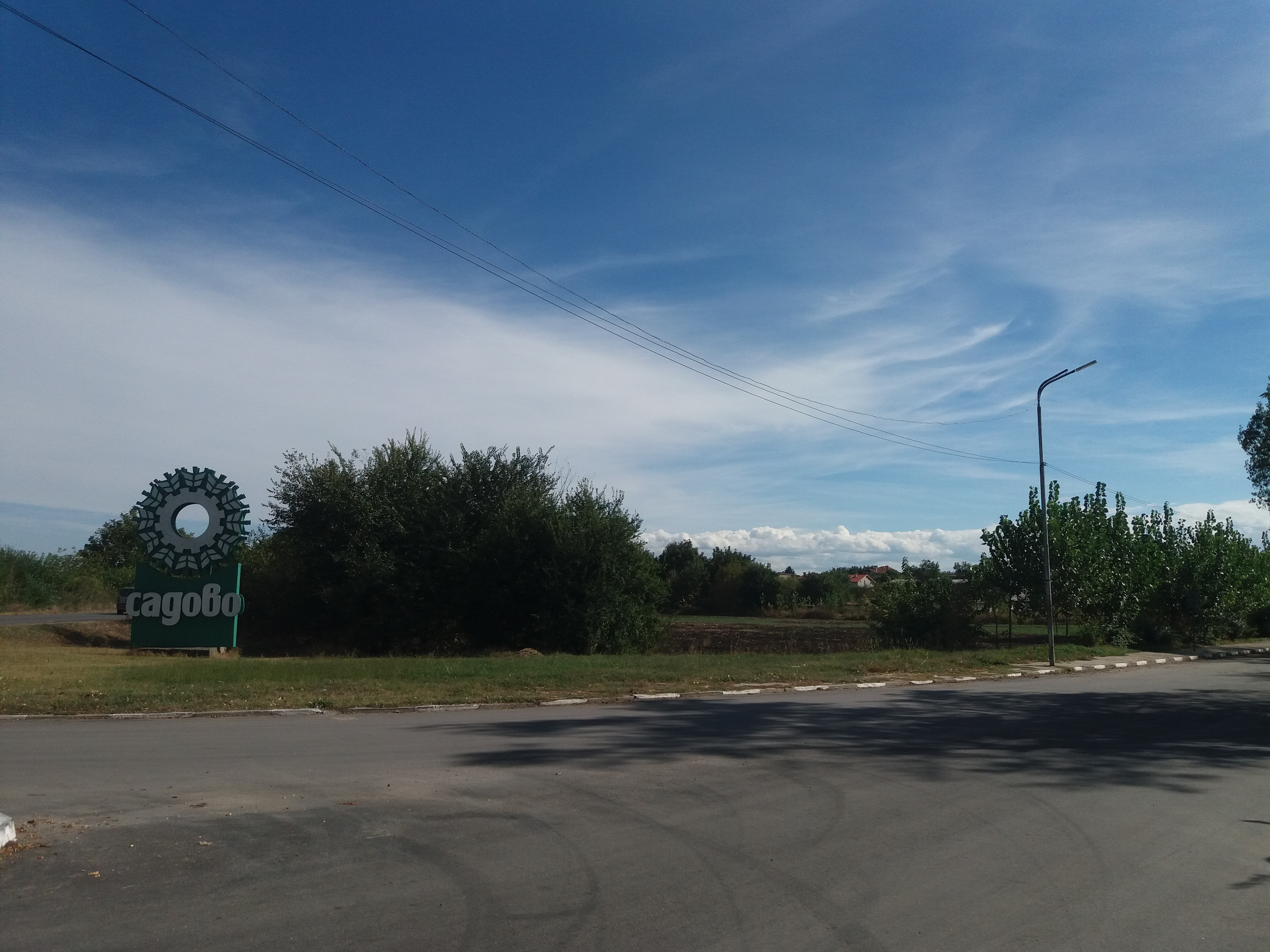

- Sadovo in Bulgaria
- Coordinates: 42.133°N 24.933°E
- Country: Bulgaria
- Province: Plovdiv
- Municipality: Sadovo Municipality

Government
  - Mayor: Dimitar Zdravkov (BSP)

Area
  - Total: 15.482 km^{2} (5.978 sq mi)
- Elevation: 156 m (512 ft)

Population (2015)
  - Total: 2,392
- Postal code: 4122
- Area code: 03118
- Vehicle registration: РВ

Sadovo (Bulgarian: Садово [ˈsadovo]) is a small town in Plovdiv Province, central Bulgaria, and the administrative center of Sadovo Municipality. The population as of 2011 was 2,600.

== Geography ==
The city is close to the Maritsa River, 18 kilometers east of Plovdiv. Sadovo municipality area also includes the villages Ahmatovo, Bogdanitsa, Bolyartsi, Karadzhovo, Katunitsa, Kochevo, Milevo, Mominsko, Popovitsa, Seltsi and Cheshnegirovo. The area's population is 15 115 people (2015).

During 1916, the highest absolute temperature (45.2 degrees Celsius or 113.36 degrees Fahrenheit) was recorded from the Sadovo weather station. This is the highest temperature to have ever been recorded in Bulgaria.

A large railway line runs through Sadovo towards Dimitrovgrad, and the Greek city Alexandroupolis.

=== Climate ===
Climate data for Sadovo(1961-1990)
Month	Jan	Feb	Mar	Apr	May	Jun	Jul	Aug	Sep	Oct	Nov	Dec	Year
Mean daily maximum °C (°F)	4.2 (39.6)	6.6 (43.9)	12.4 (54.3)	16.7 (62.1)	23.4 (74.1)	27.2 (81.0)	30.0 (86.0)	29.3 (84.7)	25.7 (78.3)	19.1 (66.4)	12.1 (53.8)	6.2 (43.2)	17.7 (64.0)
Daily mean °C (°F)	0.1 (32.2)	2.5 (36.5)	6.7 (44.1)	12.3 (54.1)	17.2 (63.0)	20.9 (69.6)	23.2 (73.8)	22.5 (72.5)	18.7 (65.7)	12.5 (54.5)	6.9 (44.4)	2.2 (36.0)	12.1 (53.9)
Mean daily minimum °C (°F)	−4.0 (24.8)	−1.3 (29.7)	1.2 (34.2)	5.4 (41.7)	10.1 (50.2)	13.8 (56.8)	15.8 (60.4)	14.9 (58.8)	11.4 (52.5)	6.2 (43.2)	2.1 (35.8)	−1.7 (28.9)	6.2 (43.1)
Average precipitation mm (inches)	41.0 (1.61)	35.0 (1.38)	41.0 (1.61)	45.0 (1.77)	61.0 (2.40)	60.0 (2.36)	49.0 (1.93)	33.0 (1.30)	34.0 (1.34)	34.0 (1.34)	46.0 (1.81)	48.0 (1.89)	527 (20.74)
Average rainy days	4	4	7	9	11	10	7	6	5	6	6	6	81
Average relative humidity (%)	82	79	73	67	68	65	61	62	65	72	79	82	71
Mean monthly sunshine hours	80	96	140	193	240	273	310	292	236	168	108	75	2,211
Source: NOAA

== History ==
The oldest name of the city is accepted as "Kyuchuk Stambol" (Bulgarian: Кючук Стамбол), the Bulgarian corruption of the name "Küçük İstanbul", which means "Little Istanbul" in Turkish, through local oral tradition. Until 1881, it was "Cheshnegir Mahala" (Bulgarian: Чешнегир махала).

Sadovo began between the years 1365–1390, when the city was founded by Turkish villagers in Thrace—during the time when Ottoman sultans, such as Murad I and Bayezid I, ruled Bulgaria. It was a Turkish and Muslim village in the beginning, populated only by Turkish Muslims. The earliest testament to its existence is in a Turkish register from 1472, where it is described under the name "Cheshnegir" in "Filibe" (Plovdiv), and where it is recorded that all of the villagers were Turkish Muslims.

The reference can be found in the personal archive of the historian Lyubomir Vasilev from Sadovo's neighboring village, Kochevo. The "Bulgarianization" and Christianization of Sadovo began during the 17th century, when in the short register from a tax for Plovdivsko from 1622, there is already evidence that in Sadovo, there were already 9 Christian households. However, up until the end of the 17th century, the village remains predominantly Muslim, even though a large increase in a Bulgarian Christian element can be seen from other documents. In another register from a tax for Plovdivsko from 1695 under the name Chashnagir, 33 families lived in the settlement, with 18 being Muslims and the other 15 Bulgarian Christians.

== Agriculture ==
Most of the people are employed in agriculture, which due to the fertile soils and the high levels of mechanization is efficient and highly productive. Major crops are apples, tomatoes, peppers, wheat, barley and rice.

== Temperature record ==
Sadovo has the highest recorded temperature (unofficial) in Bulgaria: 45.2 °C (113.4 °F). Officially, the highest record for Sadovo is 41.2 degrees Celsius (106.16 degrees Fahrenheit), while the lowest is -30.7 degrees Celsius (-23.26 degrees Fahreheit).
