= Tirizis Island =

Island of the South Shetland Islands

Location of Robert Island in the South Shetland Islands.

Topographic map of Livingston Island, Greenwich, Robert, Snow and Smith Islands.

Tirizis Island (Bulgarian: остров Тиризис, romanized: ostrov Tirizis, IPA: [ˈɔstrof tiˈrizis]) is the rocky island off the east coast of Robert Island in the South Shetland Islands, Antarctica extending 1.05 km in east-west direction and 350 m wide. It is ending in Kitchen Point to the east, and separated from the main island to the west by a 100 m wide passage formed as a result of glacier retreat in the late first decade of 21st century.

The feature is named after the ancient Thracian town of Tirizis in northeastern Bulgaria.

== Location ==
Tirizis Island is located at 62°23′20″S 59°21′15″W.

== Maps ==
- L.L. Ivanov. Antarctica: Livingston Island and Greenwich, Robert, Snow and Smith Islands. Scale 1:120000 topographic map. Troyan: Manfred Wörner Foundation, 2009. ISBN 978-954-92032-6-4 (Updated second edition 2010. ISBN 978-954-92032-9-5)
- Antarctic Digital Database (ADD). Scale 1:250000 topographic map of Antarctica. Scientific Committee on Antarctic Research (SCAR). Since 1993, regularly upgraded and updated.
