= Sadovo Municipality =

Coordinates: 42°08′N 24°56′E

Sadovo Municipality Община Садово
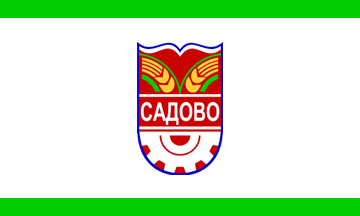
- Flag

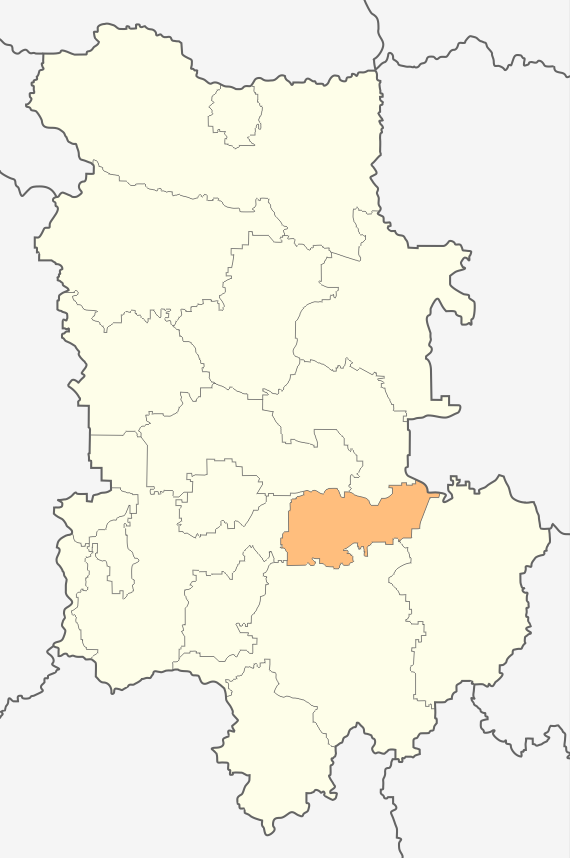
- Country: Bulgaria
- Province: Plovdiv Province
- Seat: Sadovo

Area
  - Total: 192.9 km^{2} (74.5 sq mi)

Population (2024)
  - Total: 14,528
  - Density: 75.31/km^{2} (195.1/sq mi)
- Website: sadovo.bg

Sadovo Municipality (Bulgarian: Община Садово) is a municipality in Plovdiv Province, central Bulgaria. Covering a territory of 192.9 km^{2}, it is the 12th largest of the 18 municipalities in the province, encompassing 3.22% of its total area. It borders the municipalities of Rodopi to the west, Maritsa and Rakovski to the north, Bratya Daskalovi to the northeast, Parvomay to the southeast, and Asenovgrad and to the south.

== Geography ==
The municipality has a flat topography with some low-lying hills to the southeast. It is situated in the eastern part of the Pazardzhik–Plovdiv Field, which constitutes the western half of the Upper Thracian Plain. The relieve is one of the flattest in Bulgaria with a total denivelation of only 110 m, with lowest point at 130 m in the north and highest point at 240 m in the east.

Sadovo Municipality falls within the transitional continental climatic zone. It holds the record for the highest temperature measured in Bulgaria — 45.2 °C.

Along its northern border flows a 24 km section of the river Maritsa of the Aegean Sea basin, with the municipal territory spanning south of the river. It is drained by the lower course of two of the Maritsa's right tributaries, the Chepelarska reka and the Cherkezitsa.

== Transport ==
Sadovo Municipality is traversed by four roads of the national network with a total length of 47.4 km, including an 18.9 km stretch of the first class I-8 road Kalotina–Sofia–Plovdiv–Kapitan Andreevo, the last 4.9 km of the second class II-66 road Sliven–Stara Zagora–Popovitsa, the first 13.4 km of the third class III-804 road, and the first 10.2 km of the third class III-8006 road.

From west to east runs a 22.4 km section of railway line No. 1 Kalotina–Sofia–Plovdiv–Svilengrad.

== Demography ==
The population is 14,528 as of 2024.

There are 11 villages and one town in Sadovo Municipality:

- Ahmatovo
- Bogdanitsa
- Bolyartsi
- Cheshnegirovo
- Karadzhovo
- Katunitsa
- Kochevo
- Milevo
- Mominsko
- Popovitsa
- Sadovo
- Seltsi

== Gallery ==
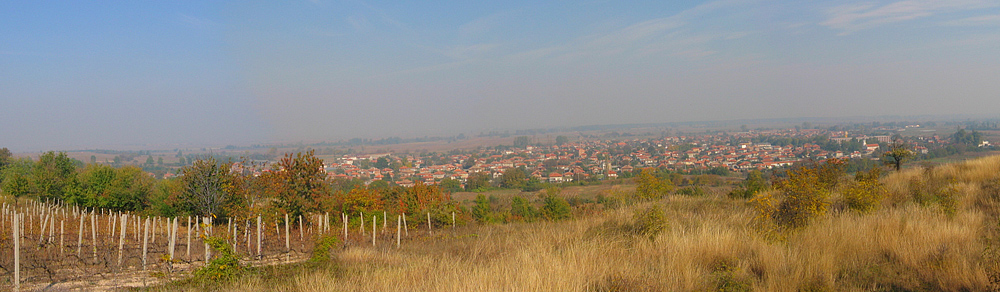
Panoramic view of Popovitsa

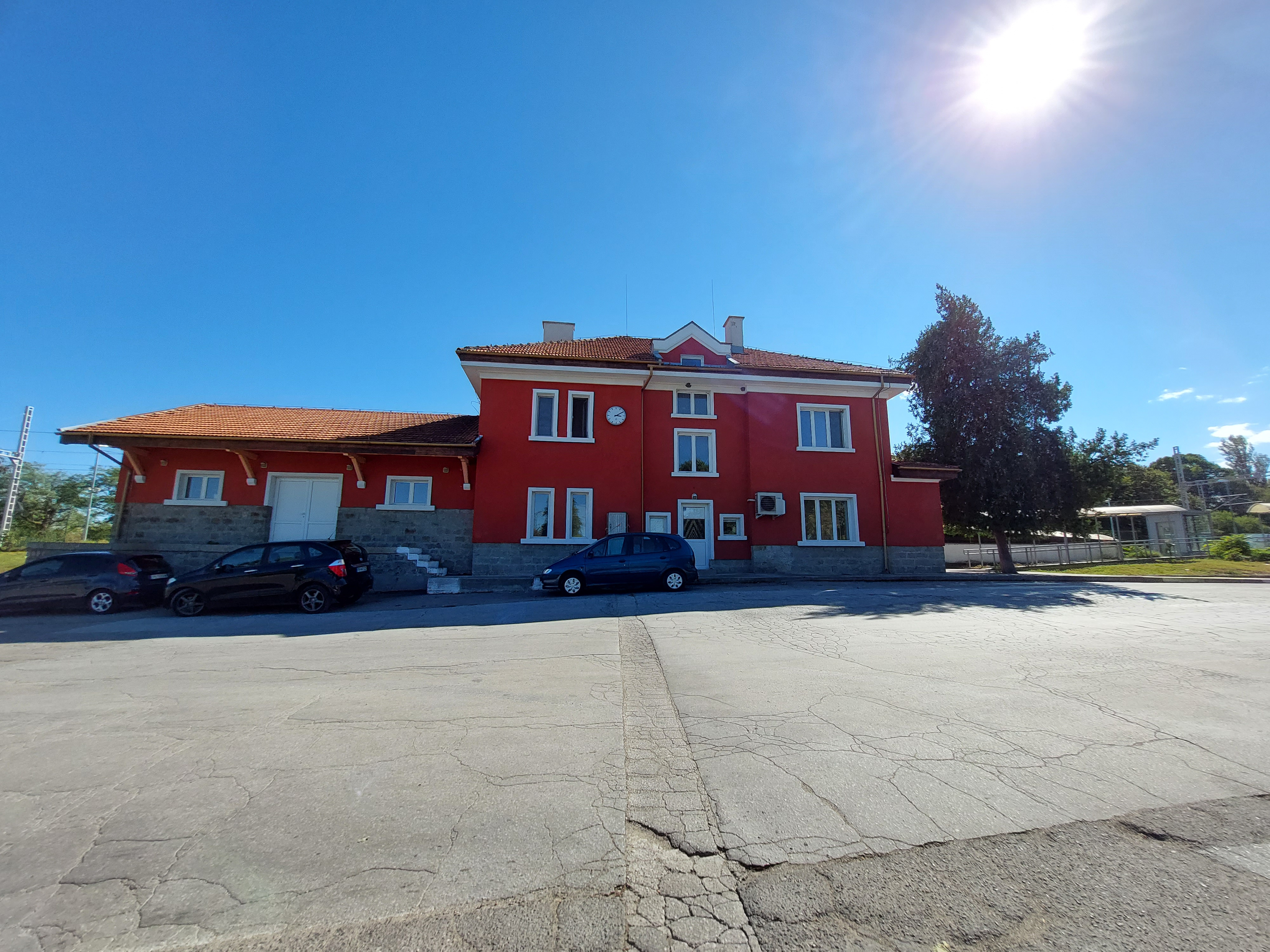
Sadovo Railway Station

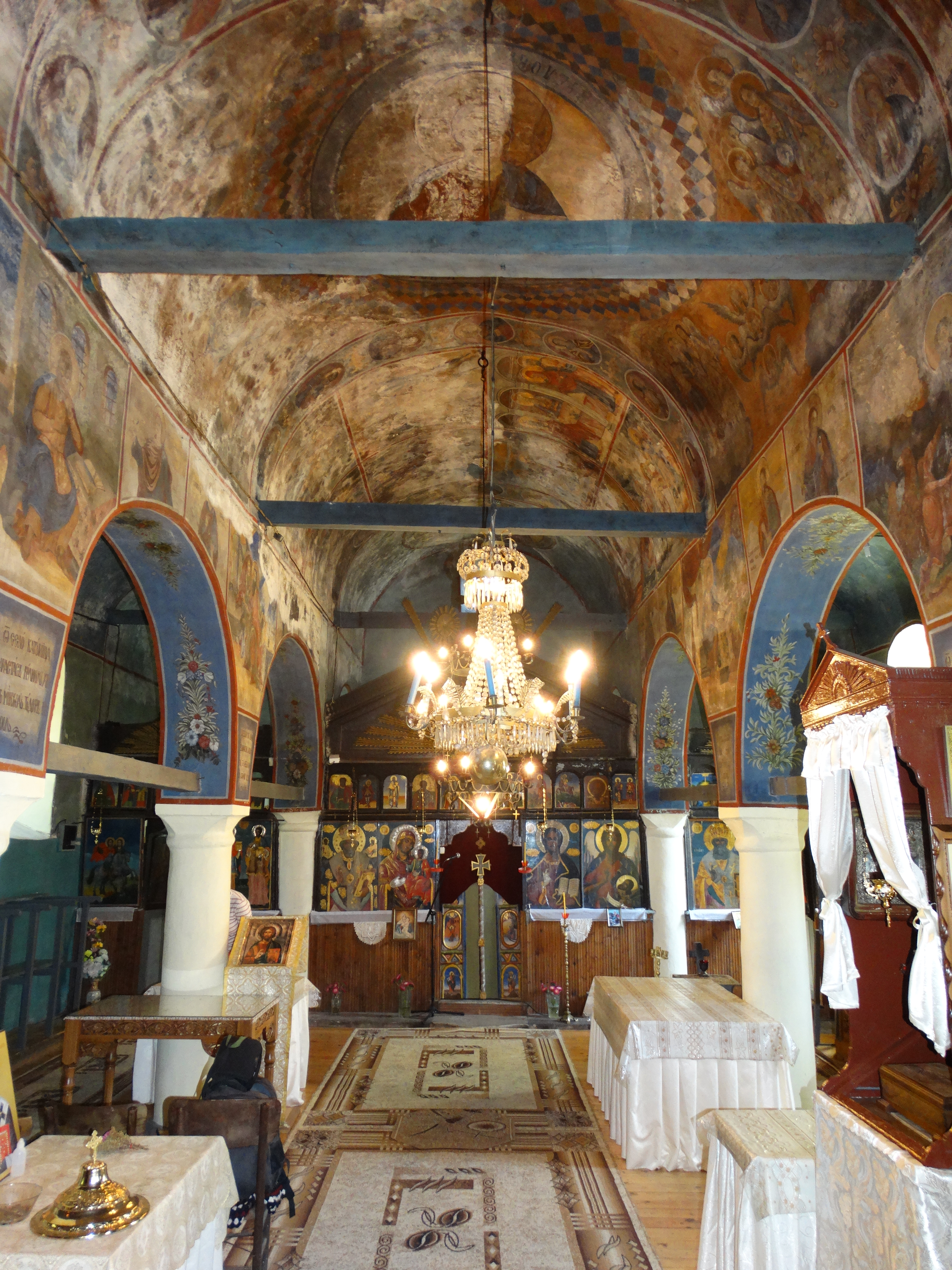
Church of St Nicholas, Katunitsa
