= Robert Point =

Location of Robert Island in the South Shetland Islands.

Topographic map of Livingston Island, Greenwich, Robert, Snow and Smith Islands.

Robert Point is a rocky point at the end of a small peninsula projecting 2.7 km into Bransfield Strait from the southeast coast of Robert Island in the South Shetland Islands, Antarctica to form the east side of the entrance to Devesil Bight.

The feature, which probably was known to the 19th century sealers, takes its name from the island.

== Location ==
The point is located at 62°27′00″S 59°22′58.8″W which is 6.14 km east-northeast of Edwards Point, 2.44 km south-southwest of Sadala Point, 5.45 km south-southwest of Batuliya Point and 7.25 km south by west of Kitchen Point (British mapping in 1935 and 1968, and Bulgarian in 2009).

== See also ==
- Robert Island
- South Shetland Islands

== Maps ==
- L.L. Ivanov. Antarctica: Livingston Island and Greenwich, Robert, Snow and Smith Islands. Scale 1:120000 topographic map. Troyan: Manfred Wörner Foundation, 2009. ISBN 978-954-92032-6-4
