= Alepu =

Swamp in Bulgaria

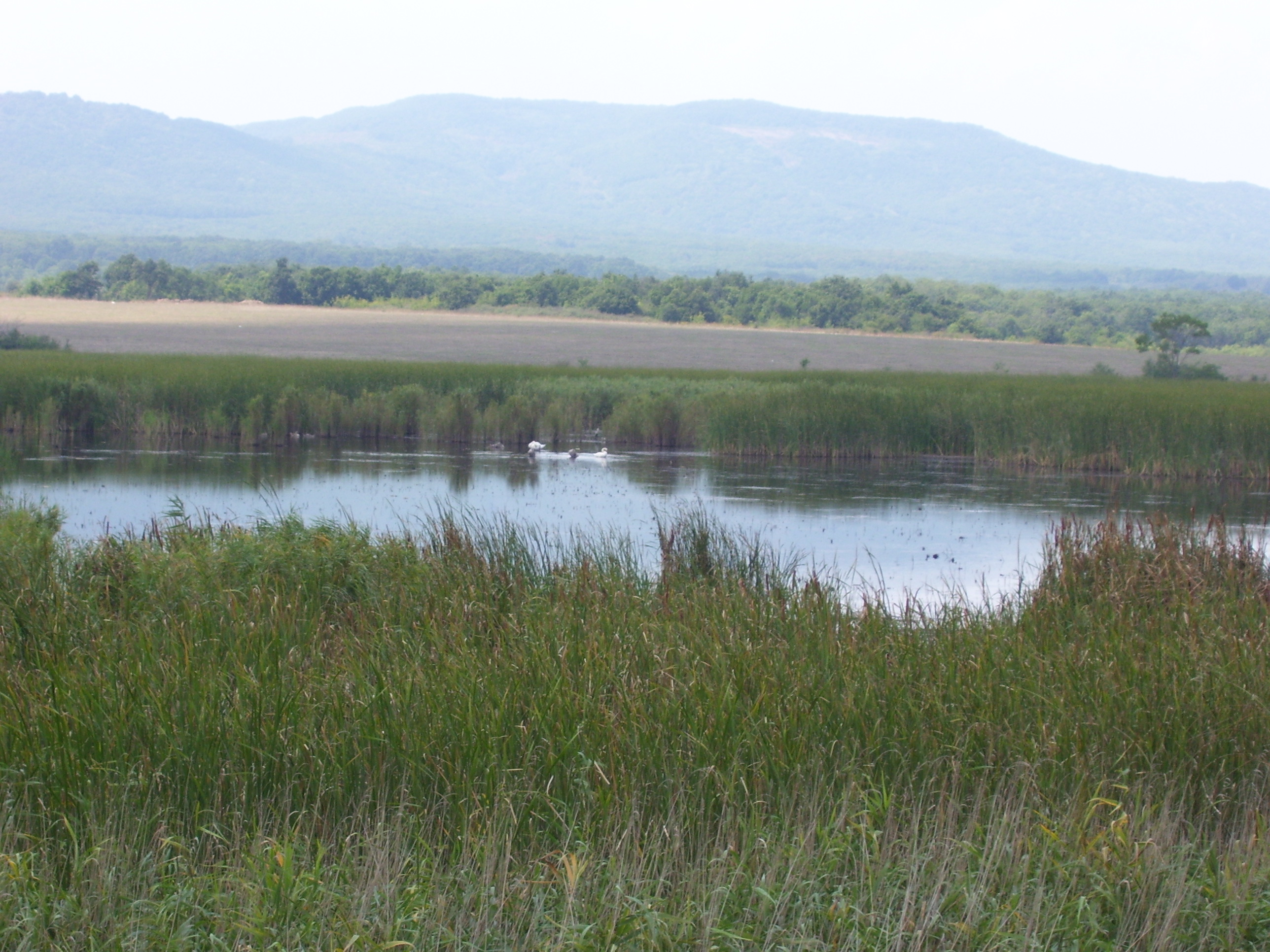
- Alepu as seen from the road

- Location within Bulgaria
- Location: Burgas Province, Bulgaria
- Nearest city: Sozopol
- Coordinates: 42.3566°N 27.7103°E
- Area: 167 hectares (410 acres)
- Established: 1986

Alepu is a swamp on the Bulgarian Black Sea coast, situated within Burgas Province, 6.5 kilometers south of the resort town of Sozopol. It is 3.3 kilometres (2.1 mi) long and up to 320 metres (1,050 ft) wide, with an area of 167 hectares (410 acres). Since 1986, the area has been designated a nature reserve due to the large variety of rare and protected water birds who live there, and has sustained significant interest from local and foreign ornithologists. The sand dunes adjacent to the reserve have also been designated as protected. Because of the lax protection from the local authorities, illegal hunting and fishing remain a threat to the reserve. It forms part of the Ropotamo Important Bird Area.

The beach across from Alepu is known for its scenery and aquamarine water. Up until the building of the Saint Thomas resort complex in 2009, it was known as one of the few truly wild beaches in Bulgaria.

Alepu Rocks in the South Shetland Islands, Antarctica are named after the Alepu locality.

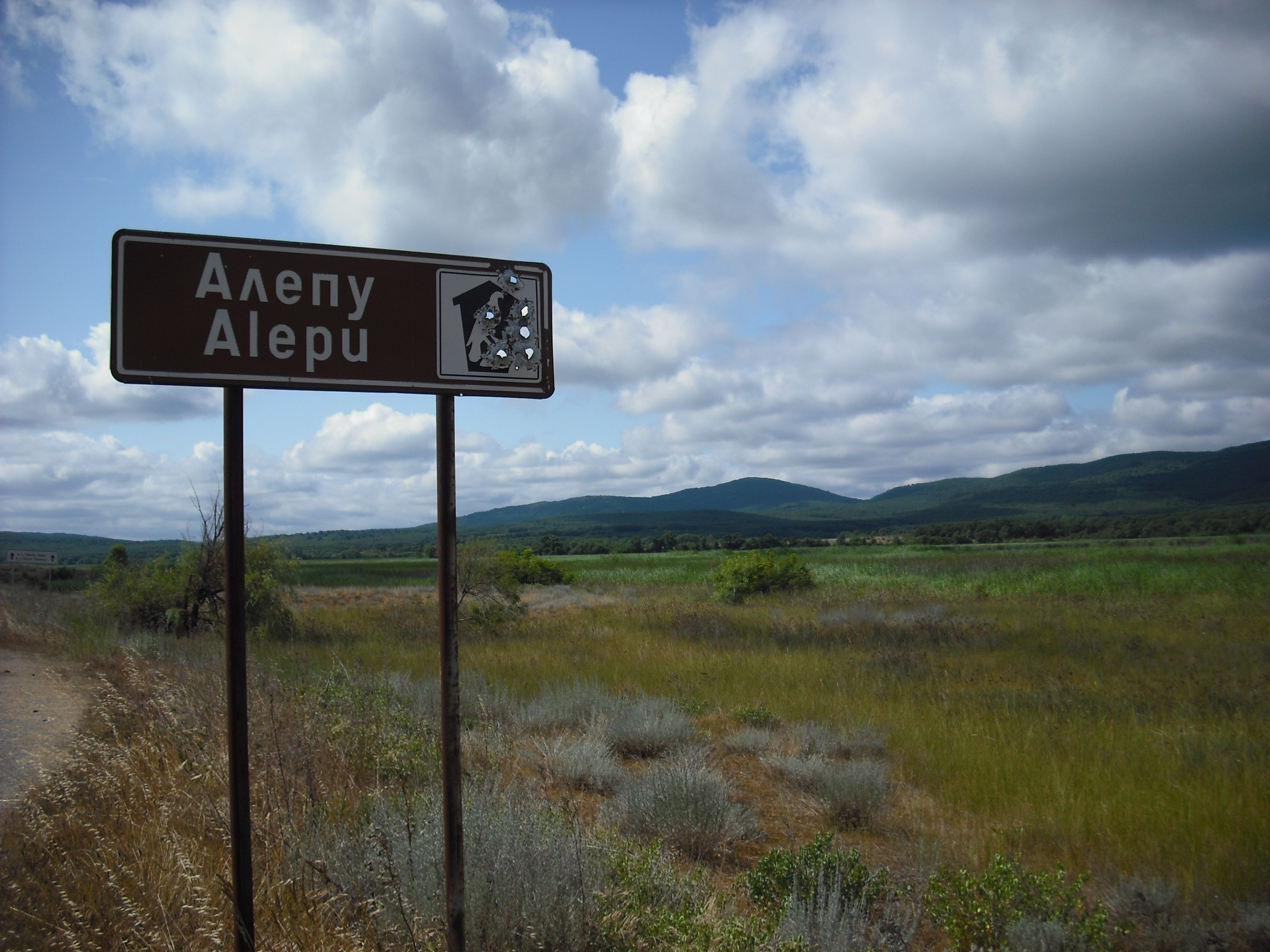
The Alepu road sign with the swamp in the background

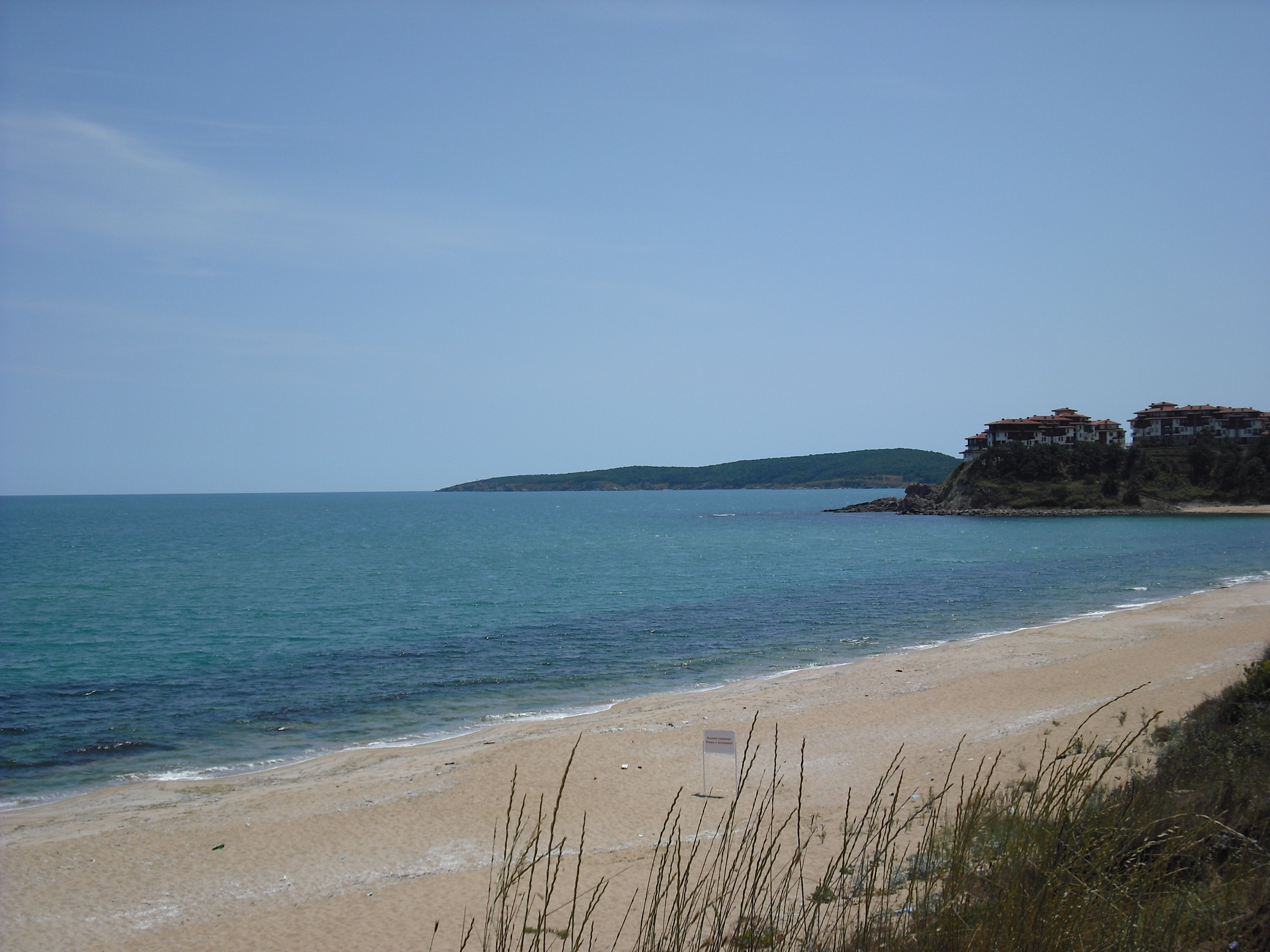
The beach across from Alepu, with the St. Thomas resort to the right

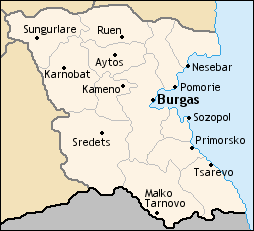
Burgas Province, Bulgaria
