= Perelik Point =

Point on Robert Island, Antarctica

Coordinates: 62°22′33″S 59°21′43″W

Location of Robert Island in the South Shetland Islands.

Topographic map of Livingston Island, Greenwich, Robert, Snow and Smith Islands.

Perelik Point (Bulgarian: нос Перелик, ‘Nos Perelik’ \'nos pe-re-'lik\) is a point on the north side of the entrance to Kozloduy Cove and the southeast side of the entrance to Garnya Cove on the east coast of Robert Island in the South Shetland Islands, Antarctica.

The point is projecting for 900 m into Nelson Strait, and is situated 1.4 km northwest of Kitchen Point and 1.2 km southeast of Smirnenski Point. Bulgarian early mapping in 2009.

The feature is named after Golyam Perelik Peak in the Rhodope Mountains, southern Bulgaria.

== Maps ==
- L.L. Ivanov. Antarctica: Livingston Island and Greenwich, Robert, Snow and Smith Islands. Scale 1:120000 topographic map. Troyan: Manfred Wörner Foundation, 2009. ISBN 978-954-92032-6-4
