= Narechenski Bani =

Village in Bulgaria

Coordinates: 41°55′N 24°46′E

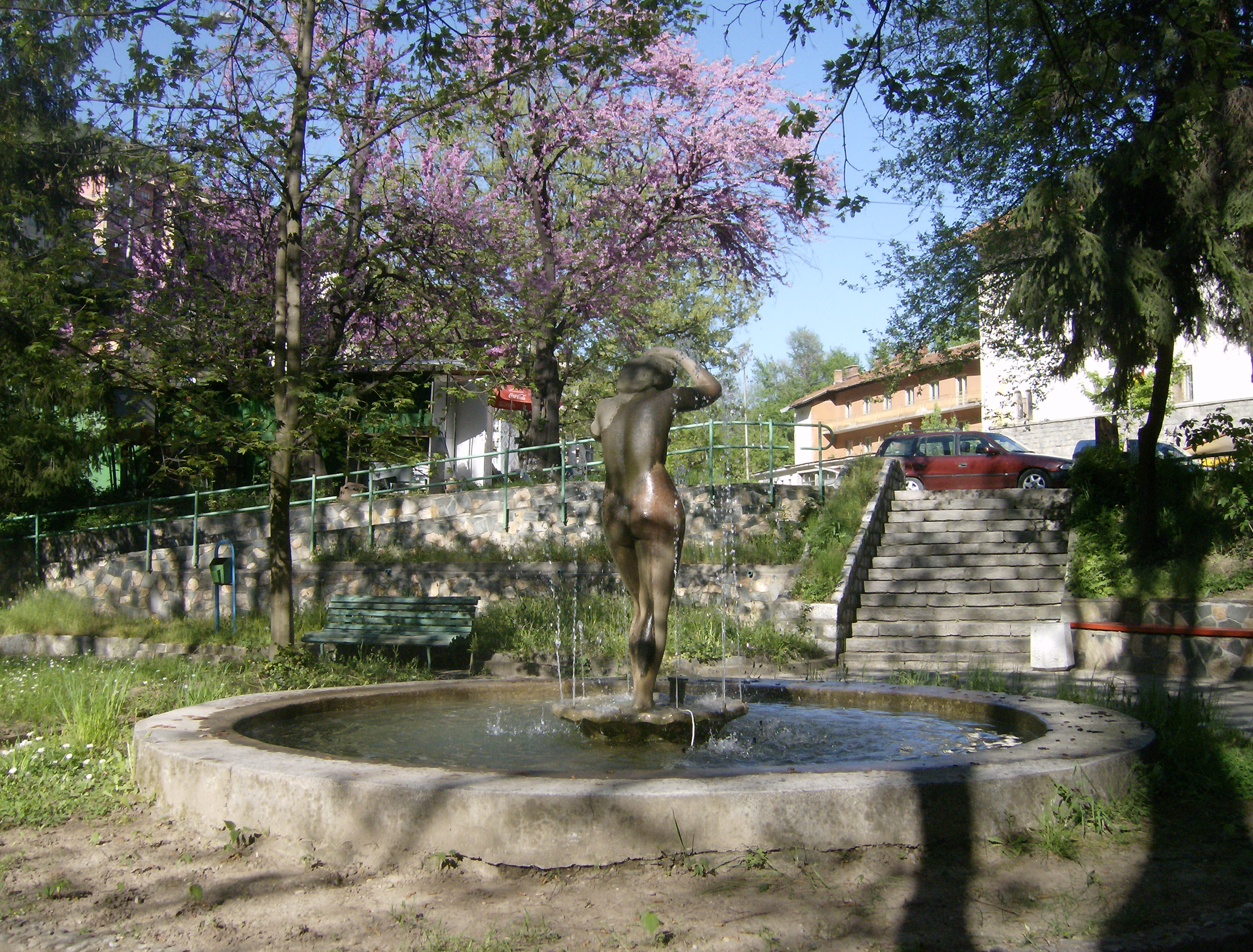
Narechen Baths

Narechen (Bulgarian: Наречен), also called Narechenski Bani (Bulgarian: Нареченски Бани), is a village in Asenovgrad Municipality, Plovdiv Province, central Bulgaria. As of 2013 it had 719 inhabitants. It is set amid a pine forest on the Chepelarska reka in the Rhodope Mountains, 42 km southwest of Plovdiv. The village is notable for its hypothermal mineral springs which was transformed into a spa resort.
