= Batuliya Point =

Location of Robert Island in the South Shetland Islands.

Topographic map of Livingston Island, Greenwich, Robert, Snow and Smith Islands.

Batuliya Point (Bulgarian: нос Батулия, ‘Nos Batuliya’ \'nos ba-'tu-li-ya\) is an ice-free tipped point forming the east extremity of Robert Island and the south side of the entrance to Tsepina Cove in the South Shetland Islands, Antarctica.

The point, projecting 550 m into Bransfield Strait, is situated 5.4 km northeast of the southeast extremity of Robert Point, 3 km north-northeast of Sadala Point, and 1.9 km south (and a trifle to the east) of Kitchen Point.

The feature is named after the settlement of Batuliya in western Bulgaria.

== Location ==
Batuliya Point is located at 62°24′16″S 59°20′41″W. Bulgarian mapping in 2009.

== Map ==
- L.L. Ivanov. Antarctica: Livingston Island and Greenwich, Robert, Snow and Smith Islands. Scale 1:120000 topographic map. Troyan: Manfred Wörner Foundation, 2009. ISBN 978-954-92032-6-4
