= Rhodope Mountains =

Mountain range in Southeastern Europe

Rhodopes
- Bulgarian: Родопи; Greek: Ροδόπη; Aromanian: Rodopi; Turkish: Rodoplar
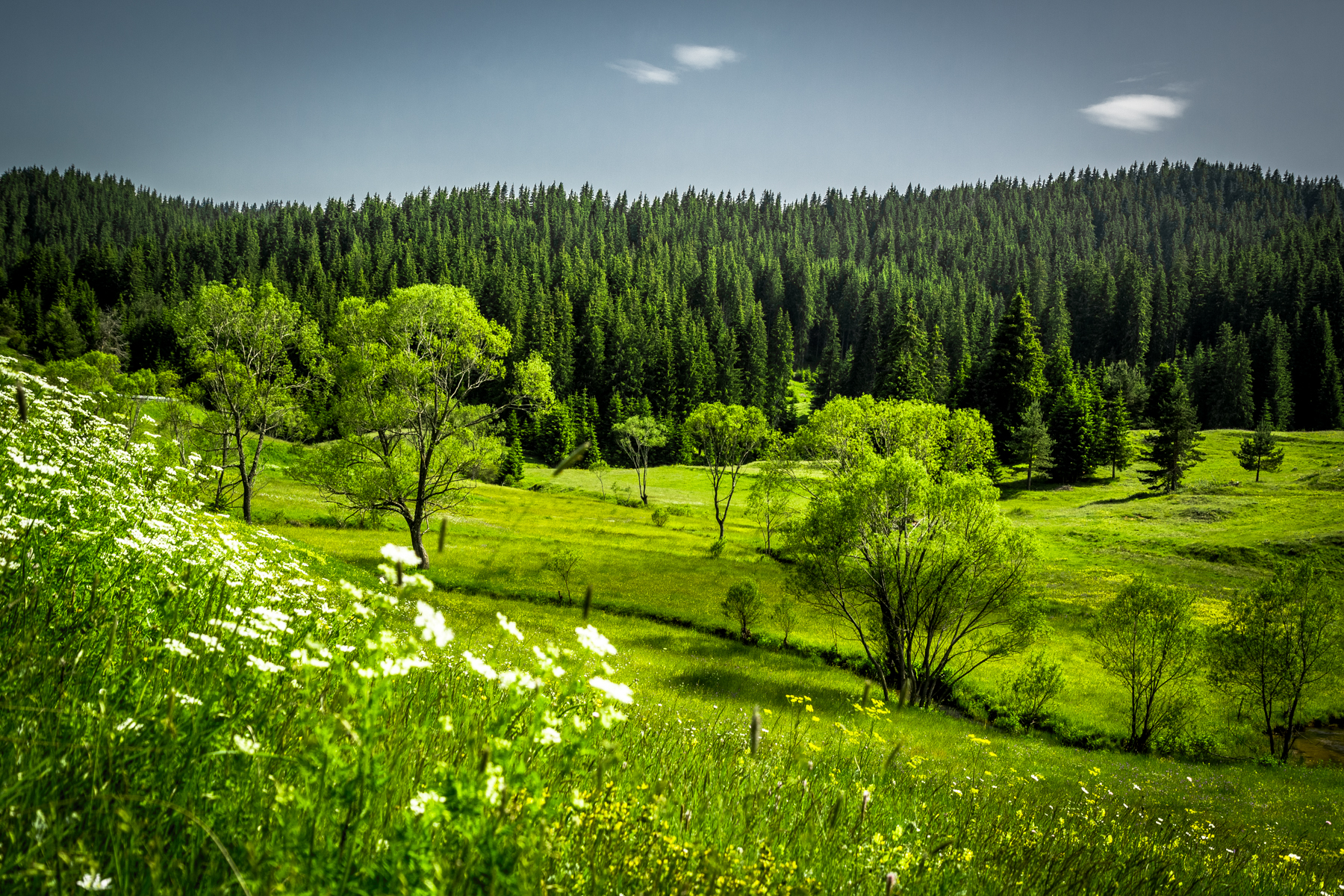
- Vacha Reservoir

Highest point
- Peak: Golyam Perelik
- Elevation: 2,191 m (7,188 ft)
- Coordinates: 41°36′04″N 24°34′27″E

Dimensions
- Length: 240 km (150 mi) west-east
- Width: 100 km (62 mi) north-south
- Area: 14,735 km^{2} (5,689 mi^{2})

Geography
- Countries: Bulgaria; Greece

Geology
- Rock types: granite; gneiss; marble; quartz

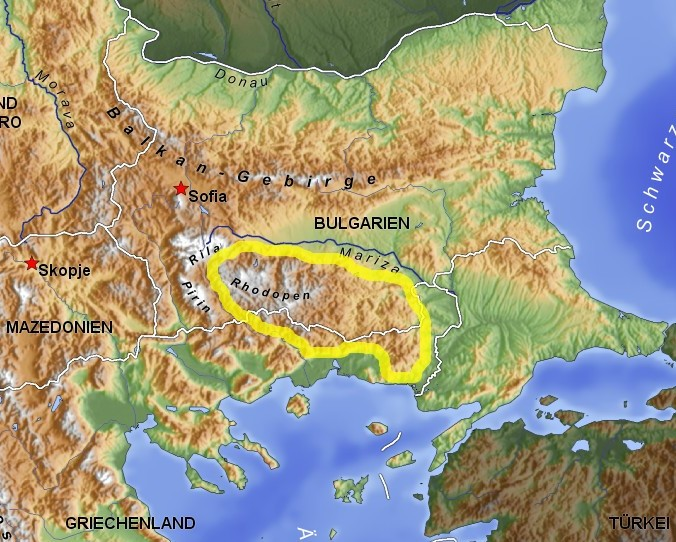
Location of the Rhodopes in Bulgaria and Greece

The Rhodopes (/ˈrɒdəpiːz/; Bulgarian: Родопи, Rodopi; Greek: Ροδόπη, Rodopi; Turkish: Rodoplar) are a mountain range in Southeastern Europe, and the largest by area in Bulgaria, with over 83% of its area in the southern part of the country and the remainder in Greece. Golyam Perelik is its highest peak at 2,191 meters (7,188 ft). The mountain range gives its name to the terrestrial ecoregion Rodope montane mixed forests that belongs in the temperate broadleaf and mixed forests biome and the Palearctic realm. The region is particularly notable for its karst areas with their deep river gorges, large caves and specific sculptured forms, such as the Trigrad Gorge.

A significant part of Bulgaria's hydropower resources are located in the western areas of the range. There are a number of hydro-cascades and dams used for electricity production, irrigation, and as tourist destinations.

== Name and mythology ==
The name of the Rhodope Mountains is of Thracian origin. Rhod-ope is interpreted as the first name of a river, meaning "rusty/reddish river", where Rhod- has the same Indo-European root as the Bulgarian "руда" (ore, "ruda"), "ръжда" (rust, "rǎžda"), "риж" (red-haired, "riž"), Latin "rufus" (red), German "rot" (red), English "red", Greek ροδ- (rhod).

In Greek mythology, Queen Rhodope of Thrace, the wife of King Haemus of Thrace, offended the gods, and was changed into a mountain by Zeus and Hera as a punishment.

== Geography ==
Map of the Rhodopes

In geomorphological terms, the Rhodopes are part of the Rila-Rhodope massif, which is the oldest landmass on the Balkan Peninsula. The Rhodopes are spread over 14,735 square kilometers (5,689 sq mi), of which 12,233 square kilometers (4,723 sq mi) are on Bulgarian territory. They have the greatest extent of any single mountain range in Bulgaria. The mountains are about 240 kilometers (149 mi) long and about 100 to 120 kilometres (62 to 75 mi) wide, with an average altitude of 785 meters (2,575 ft). To the north the mountain slopes descend steeply towards the Upper Thracian Plain. To the west, the Rhodopes reach the Avram saddle, Yundola and the valley of the Mesta River. To the south and east they extend to the coastal plains of Greek Thrace. The Rhodopes are a complex system of ridges and deep river valleys.

Fifteen reserves have been established in the region, some of which are under UNESCO protection. The mountains are famous for the largest coniferous woods in the Balkans, their mild relief and the lush vegetation in the western parts as well as the abundance of birds of prey in the eastern areas.

=== Climate ===
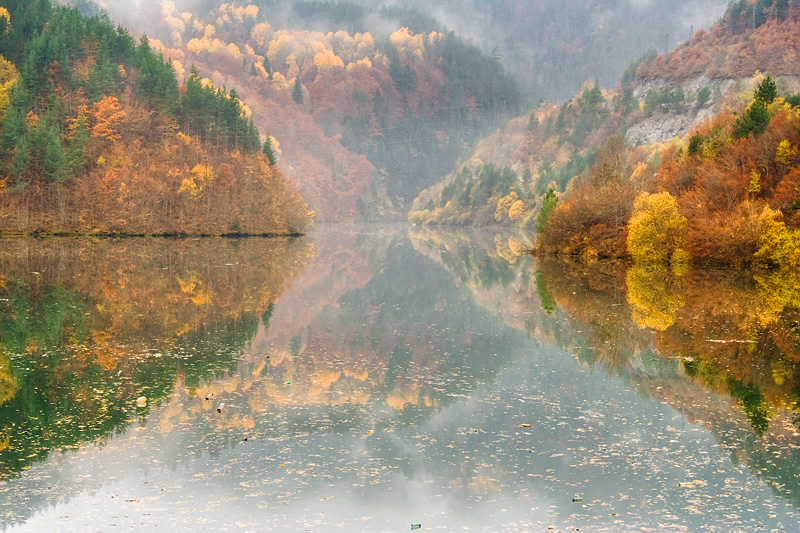
Autumn in the Rhodopes

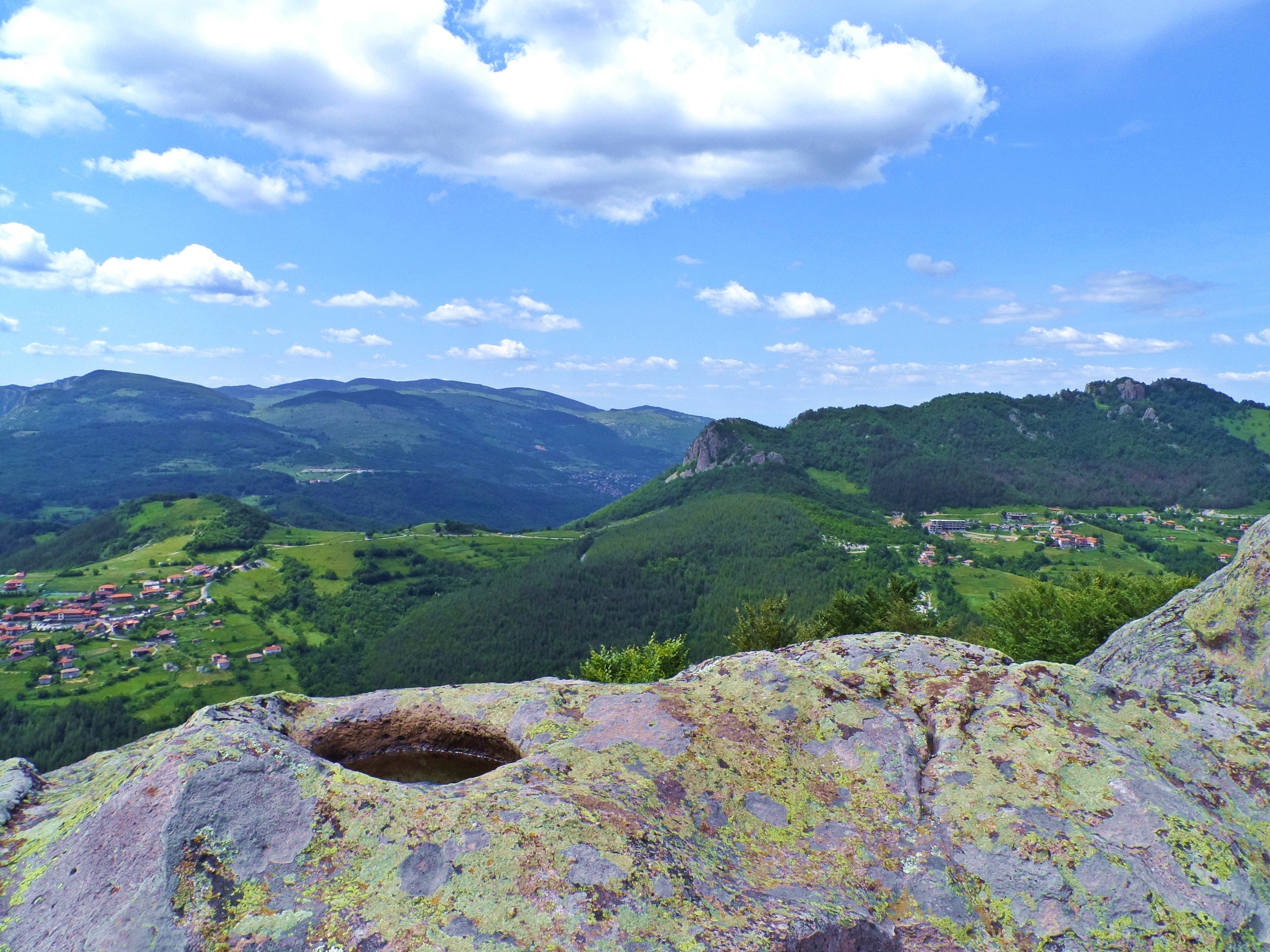
View from Belintash towards the village of Vrata

The location of the Rhodopes in the southeastern part of the Balkan Peninsula largely determines the climate in the region. It is influenced both by the colder air coming from the north and by the warmer breeze from the Mediterranean.

The average annual temperature in the Eastern Rhodopes is 13 °C (55 °F), the maximum precipitation is in December, the minimum in August. In the Western Rhodopes, the temperature varies from 5 to 9 °C (41 to 48 °F) and in the summer rainfall prevails.

The mild climate, combined with some other factors, works in favour of the development of recreation and tourist activities. The Pamporovo resort, where the microclimate permits a heavy snow cover to be preserved for a long time, is an excellent example.

Temperatures as low as −15 °C (5 °F) are common in winter, and due to this the Rhodopes are the southernmost place in the Balkans where tree species such as the Norway Spruce and the Silver Birch can be found.

=== Waters ===
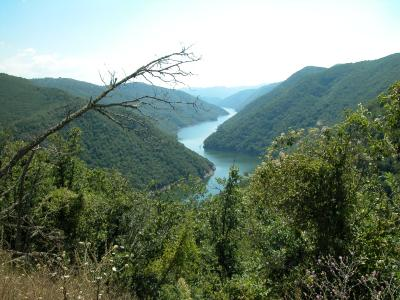
The river Mesta crossing the mountains

The mountains have abundant water reserves, with a dense network of mountain springs and rivers. Nearly 80% of the mountain's territory falls within the drainage of the river Maritsa. The natural lakes are few, the most renown of these being the Smolyan lakes situated at several kilometers from the town of the same name. Some of the largest dams in the country are located in the Rhodopes including the Dospat Dam, Batak Dam, Golyam Beglik, Kardzhali Dam, Studen Kladenets, Vacha Dam, Shiroka Polyana and many others, while in Greece there are the dams of Thisavros and Platanovrysi. They are used mainly for hydroelectric power generation and for irrigation. There are many mineral water springs, the most famous being in Velingrad, Narechen, Devin, Beden, Mihalkovo, and the village of Lenovo. In Greece there are mineral water springs in Thermes, 40 km north of (Xanthi) and in Thermia, 60 km north of Drama, at 620 m.

=== Subdivision ===
==== Western Rhodopes ====
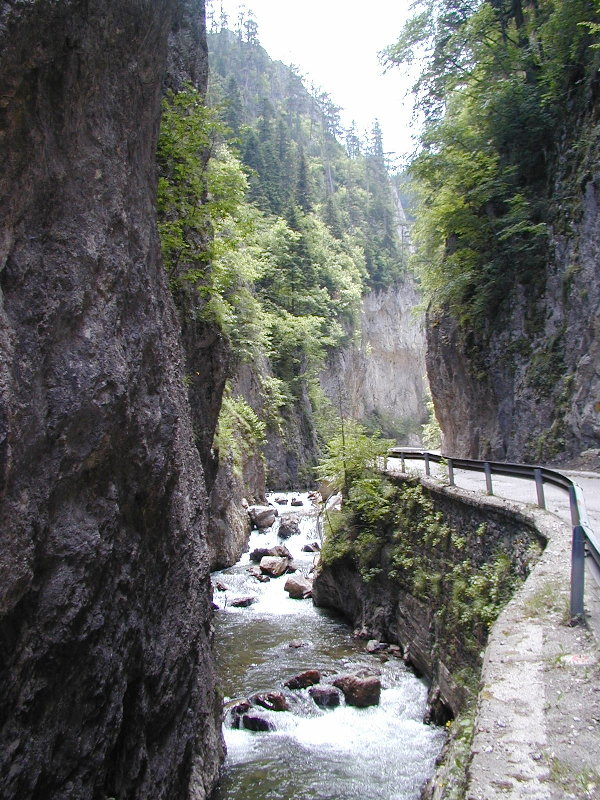
Trigrad Gorge

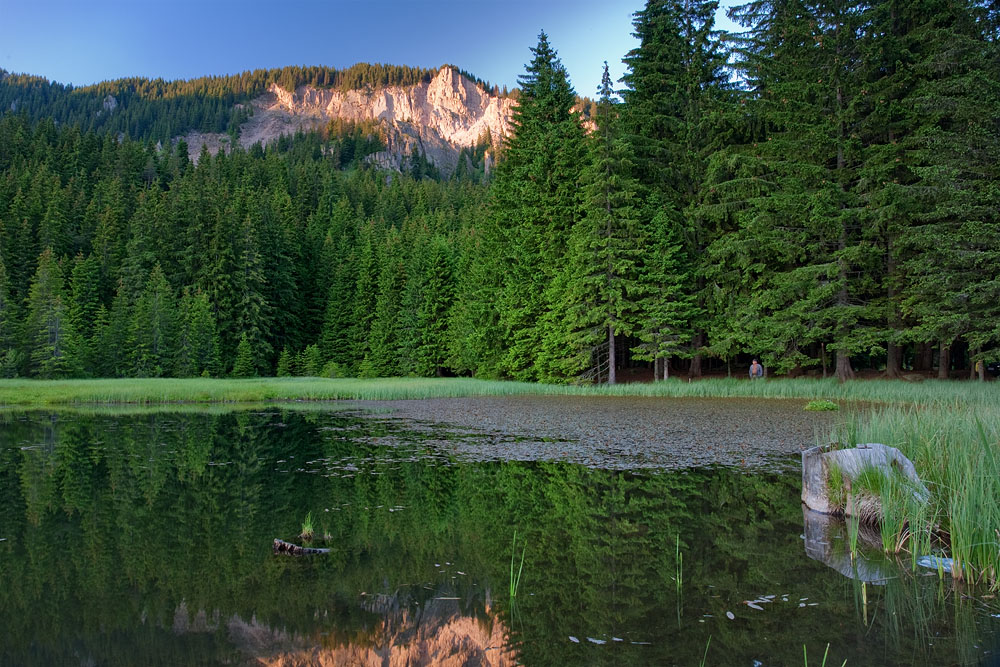
Forests near the Smolyan lakes

The Western Rhodopes are the largest (66% of the area of the Rhodopes in Bulgaria), higher, most infrastructurally developed, and most visited part of the mountains. The highest and best known peaks are located in the region (more than 10 are over 2,000 meters (6,562 ft) high) including the highest one, Golyam Perelik (2,191 meters (7,188 ft)). Among the other popular peaks are Shirokolashki Snezhnik (2,188 meters (7,178 ft)), Golyam Persenk (2,091 meters (6,860 ft)), Batashki Snezhnik (2,082 meters (6,831 ft)), Turla (1,800 meters (5,906 ft)).

Some of the deepest river gorges in the Rhodopes are located in the western parts, as well as the rock phenomenon Wonderful Bridges. Significant bodies of water include the Chaira lakes and the Dospat, Batak, Shiroka Polyana, Golyam Beglik and Tsigov Chark dams.

The town of Batak is also located in this part of the mountains, as well as the popular tourist centres Smolyan, Velingrad, Devin, Chepelare, the winter resort Pamporovo, the Eastern Orthodox Bachkovo Monastery, the ruins of the Asen dynasty's fortress, and the Devil's Throat, Yagodinska, and Uhlovitsa caves. The highest village in Bulgaria, Manastir (over 1,500 meters (4,921 ft)), is crouched in the northern foot of Prespa Peak. A number of architectural reserves, such as Shiroka Laka, Kovachevitsa, Momchilovtsi, Kosovo, are also located in the area.

==== Eastern Rhodopes ====
The Eastern Rhodopes are spread over a territory of about 34% of the mountains' area in Bulgaria, constituting a much lower part.

The large artificial dams Kardzhali and Studen Kladenets are located in this part of the mountains. The region is rich in thermal mineral springs. The waters around Dzhebel have national reputation for healing various diseases. Belite Brezi is an important healing centre for respiratory and other ailments.

Major cities in the area are Haskovo and Kardzhali, as well as the smaller Momchilgrad, Krumovgrad, Zlatograd and Kirkovo. The Eastern Rhodopes, being significantly lower, are also more populated than the western part.

Almost every species of the European birds of prey nest in the rocks and forests of the Eastern Rhodopes including the rare black vulture and Egyptian vulture.

==== Southern (Greek) Rhodopes ====
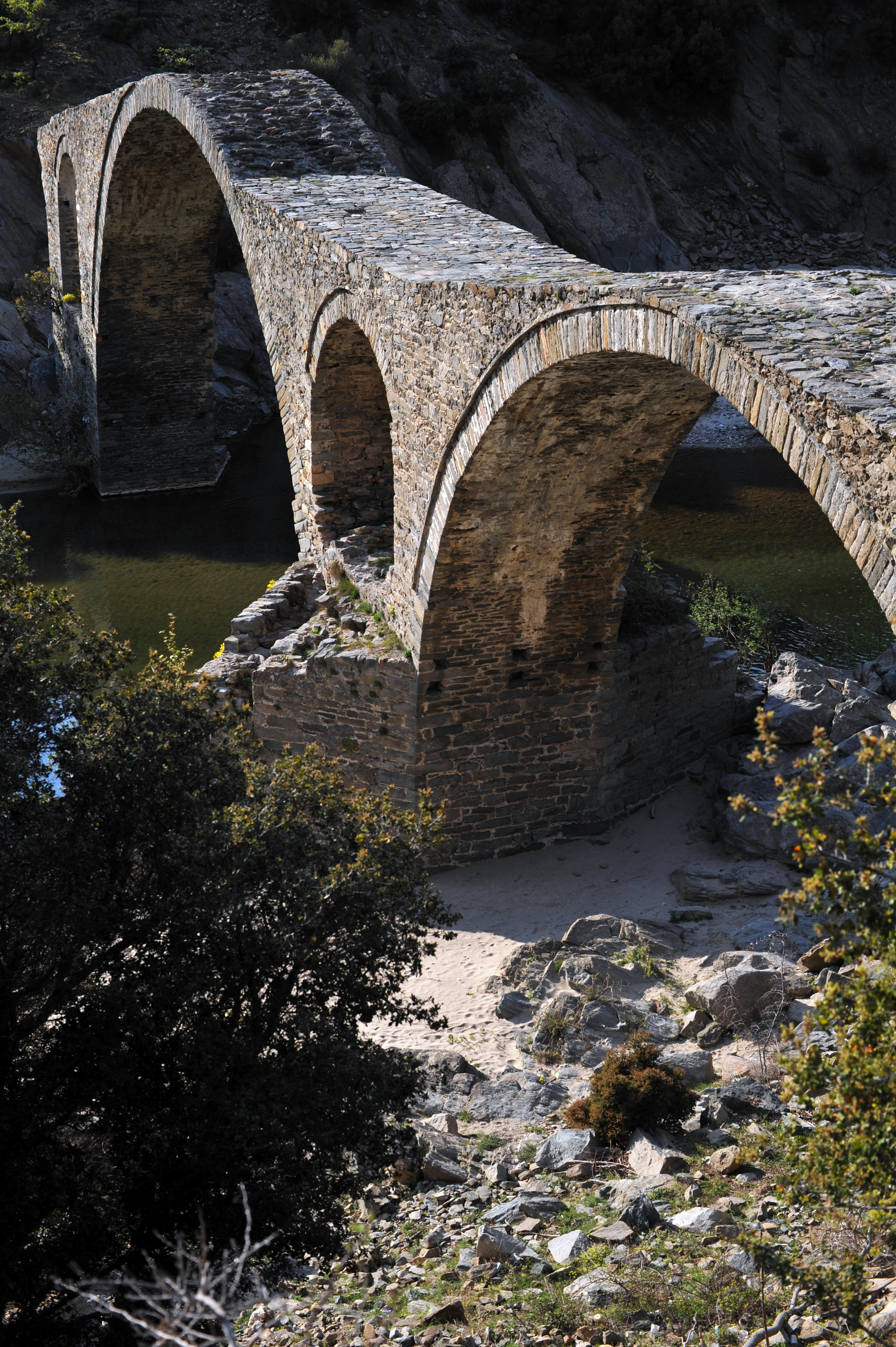
Kompsatos Bridge Polyanthos Rhodope

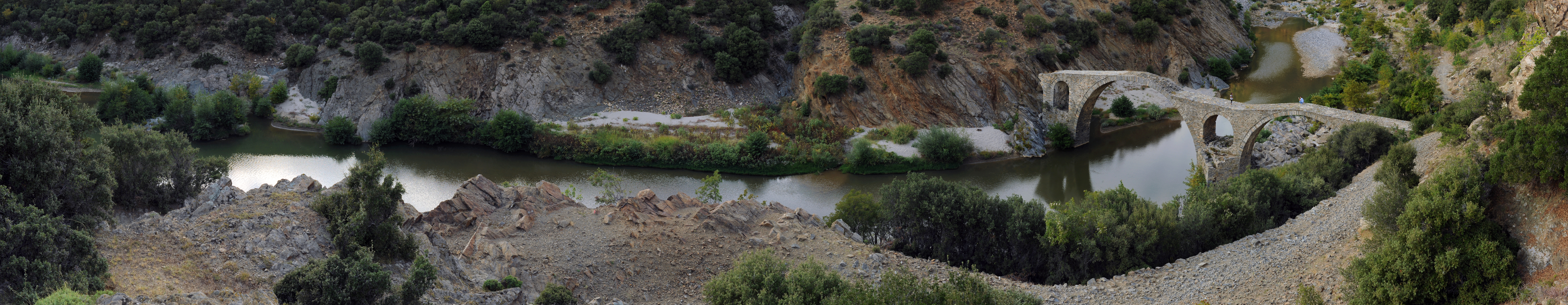
Kompsatos 17th–18th c. Bridge Polyanthos Rhodope Panorama

The Southern Rhodopes are the part of the mountain range that is located in Greece. The Rhodope regional unit in the northern part of the country is named after the region. This area includes the Rodopi Mountain Range National Park.

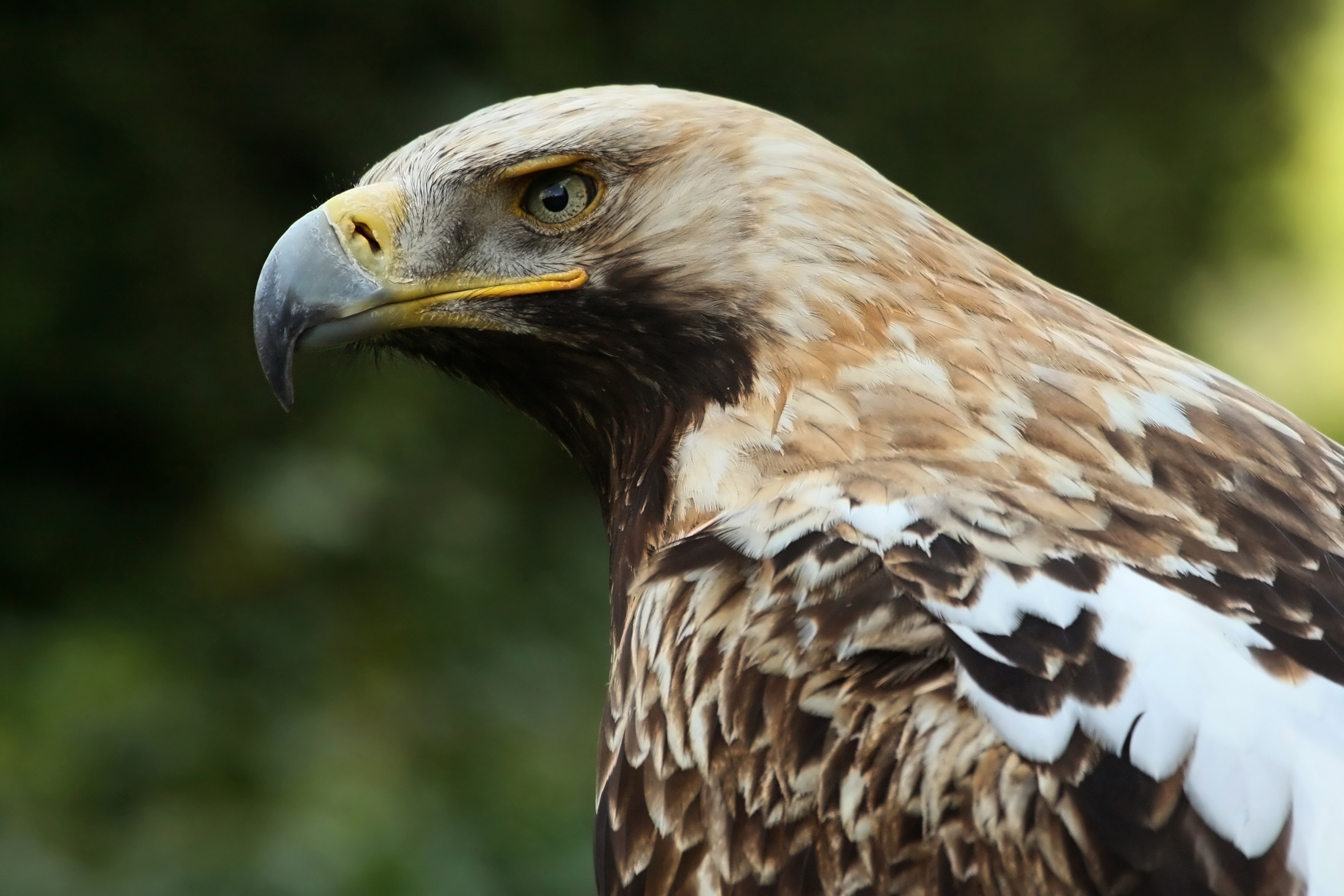
Eastern imperial eagle

The Southern Rhodopes are characterized by numerous peaks of relatively low altitude. Their highest peak is Delimposka (1,953m) in the mountain of Frakto, near the Greek-Bulgarian border. Nowadays the Southern Rhodopes is an area almost deserted. After World War II and the Greek Civil War most villages depopulated permanently and their inhabitants never returned. Even the Sarakatsani stockbreeders abandoned the difficult life of the Rhodopes. The depopulation of the region, that has not been grazed for more than 50 years, combined with high rainfall and its geographical location, has contributed to the creation and maintenance of a biological paradise. There grow coniferous trees, such as the Norway Spruce and the Silver Birch, that cannot be found elsewhere in Greece.

In the forest of Frakto there are 300-year-old trees, more than 50 metres high, and the endangered wild goat.

In the eastern part of the region there is the well known nature reserve of Dadia Forest, an ideal habitat for birds of prey, with 36 of the 38 species of birds of prey of Europe, like the rare Eastern imperial eagle and Lesser spotted eagle.

== History ==
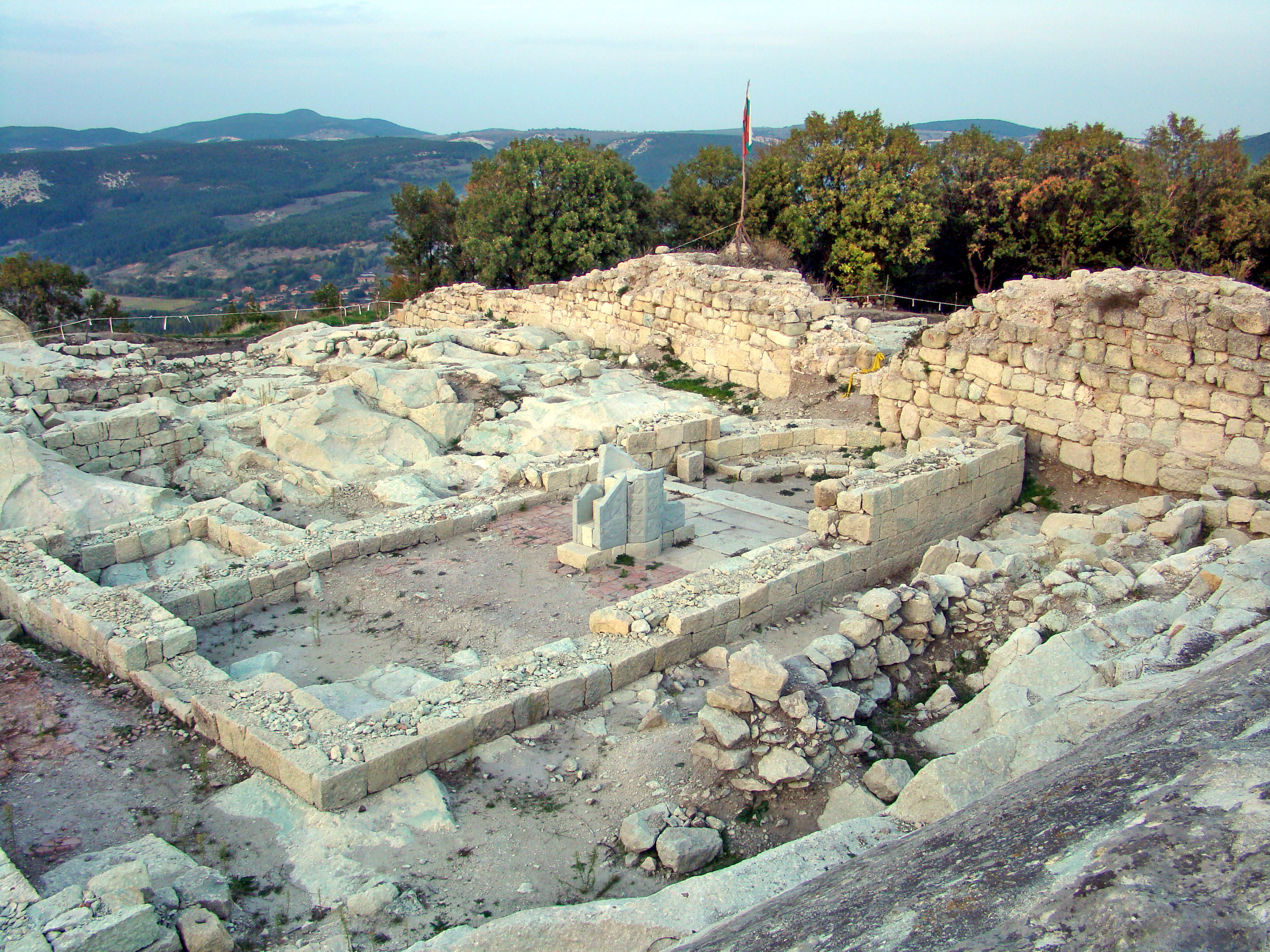
The remains of the ancient Thracian city and sanctuary of Perperikon

The Rhodopes have been inhabited since the Prehistoric age. There have been many archaeological finds of ancient tools in some of the caves.

The first known human inhabitants in the mountains were the Thracians. They built many temples, cities and fortresses, including the sacred city of Perperikon located 15 km northeast of Kardzhali. Thracian temples was Tatul near the village of the same name. Additionally, there are archeological sites throughout the region related to the cult of Dionysus, such as the ancient Thracian city of Perperikon.

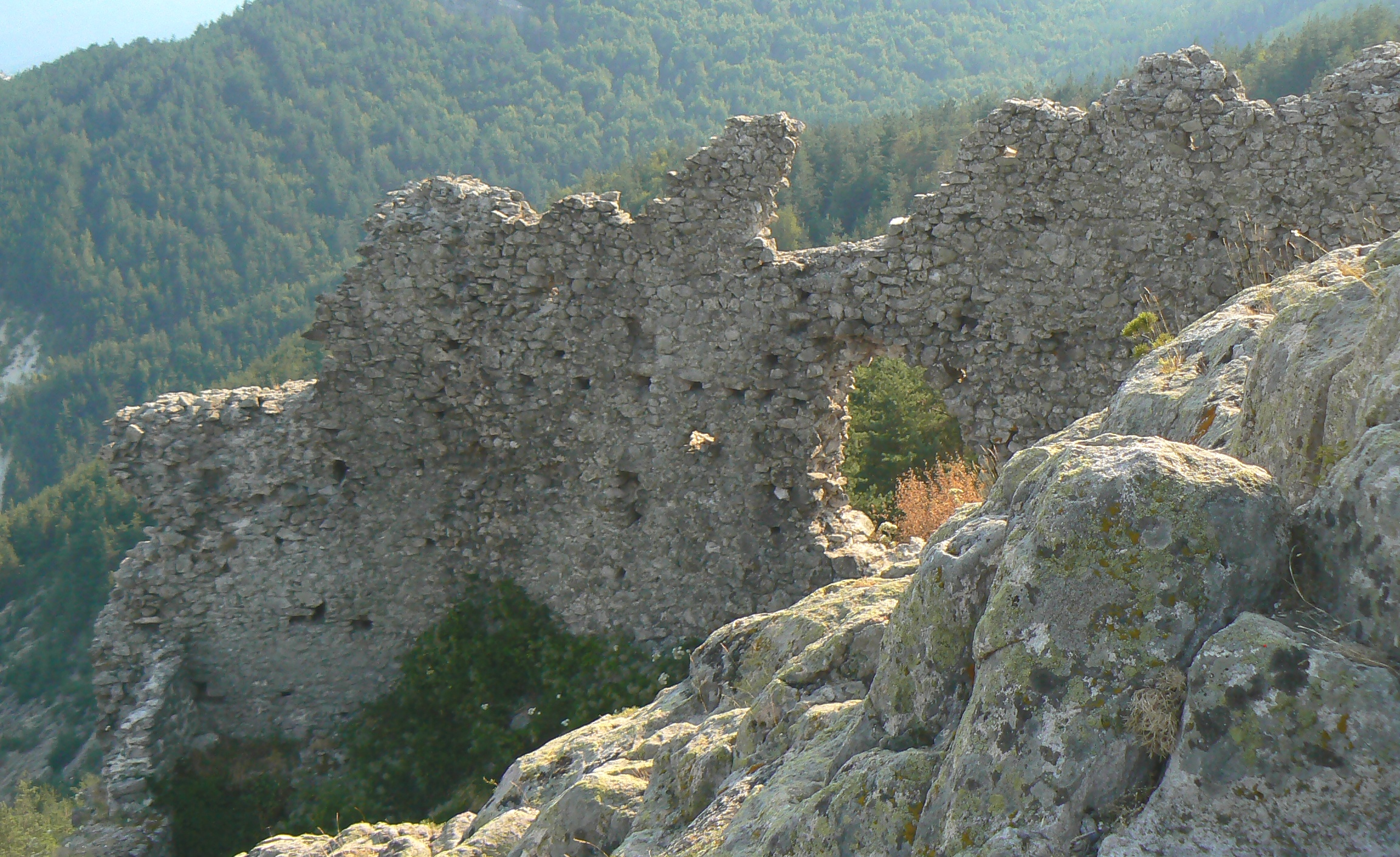
The ruins of the Ustra fortress

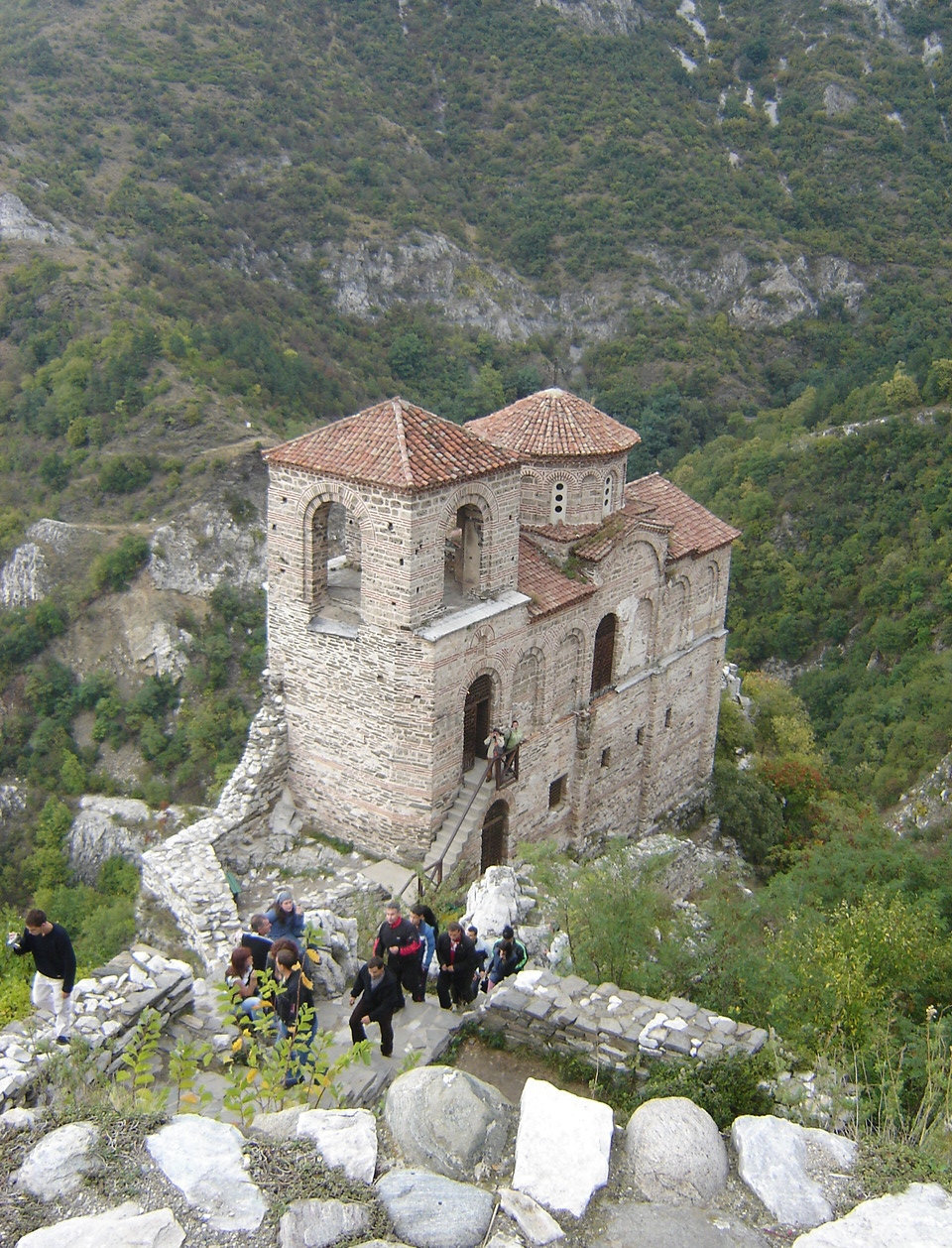
The church of the Asenova krepost

The frequent mention of the Rhodope in Ancient Greek and Latin sources indicates that the mountain had played an important role in the political and religious life of the Thracian tribes that lived on it. On the tops of the mountain there was an oracle, consulted by Alexander the Great and later by the father of Octavian Augustus. On the mountain were also sanctuaries of other deities, including Apollo, Zeus, and Mithras. Rhodope was the Thracians' last refuge of resistance against the Romans, so that Thrace became a Roman province about 200 years after Macedonia.

In 2005 German scholars from the University of Heidelberg confirmed that the two rather small fragments discovered by archaeologist Nikolay Ovcharov in the Eastern Rhodopes mountains are written in the Minoan Linear A script from about 15th century BC.

In the Middle Ages the mountain was part of the Bulgarian and Byzantine Empires and often changed hands between the two countries. There was a dense network of castles which guarded the trade routes and the strategic heights. The largest and most important castles include Lyutitsa, Ustra, Tsepina, Mezek, Asenova krepost and many others. Between 1371 and 1375 the Rhodopes fell under Ottoman occupation in the course of the Bulgarian–Ottoman wars.

During the 16th and 17th centuries the Ottoman authorities began a process of Islamisation of the region.

The towns and the villages in the Western Rhodopes took active part in the April Uprising in 1876. When the uprising was crushed the Ottomans slaughtered around 5,000 people in Batak alone. Thousands more died in Bratsigovo, Perushtitsa and other rebel villages which were also burnt and looted by the Ottomans.

The northern Rhodopes were ceded in 1878 to an autonomous province of Eastern Rumelia until its unification with the Principality of Bulgaria. The other part of the Rhodopes was annexed as a result of the First Balkan War (1912–1913) but after the Second Balkan War (1913) and the First World War (1914–1918) the southern slopes of the mountain was occupied by Greece and the Bulgarian population of the area was forced to flee to Bulgaria.

== People ==
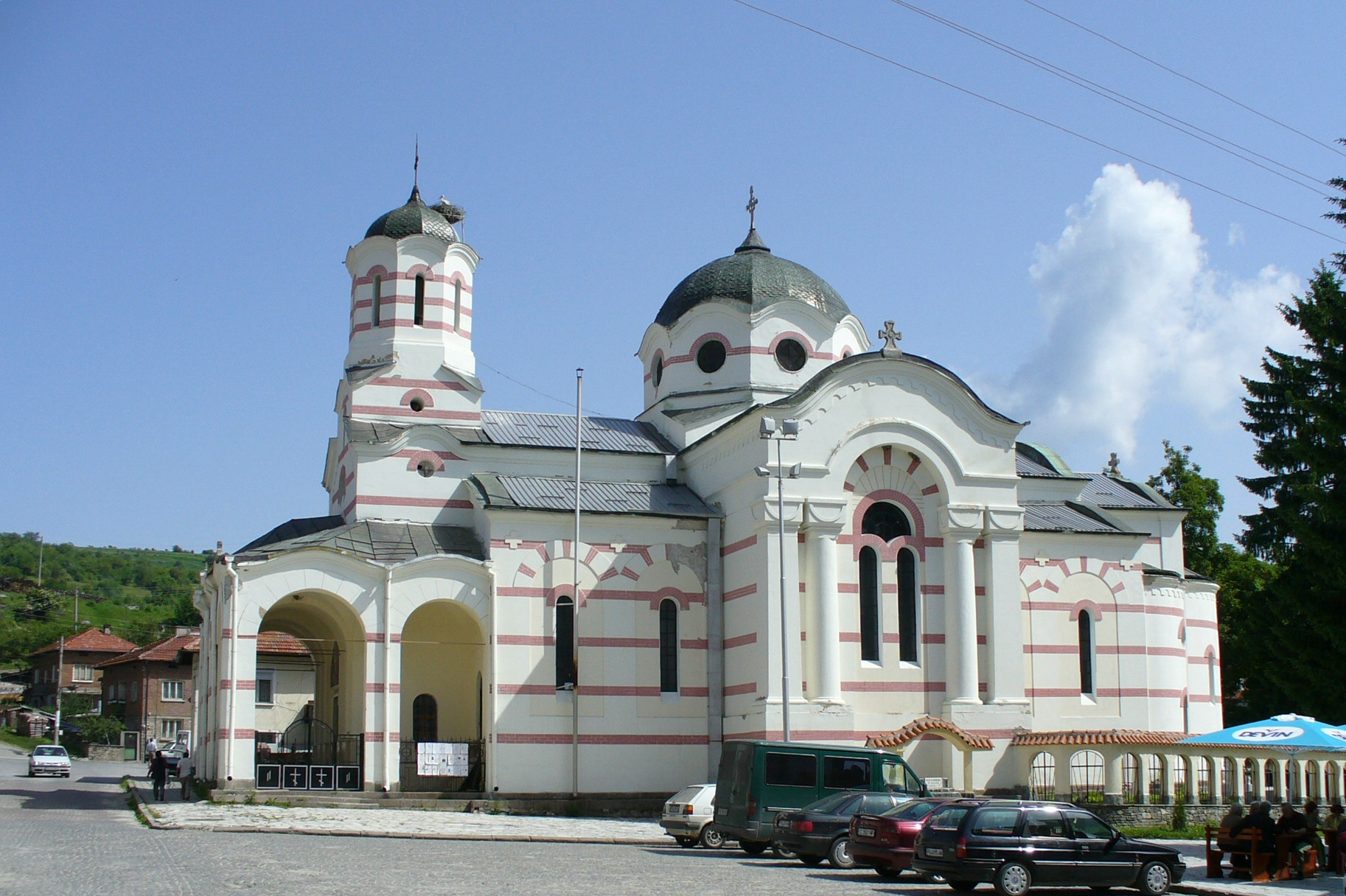
A church in Batak

The sparsely populated area of the Rhodopes has been a place of ethnic and religious diversity for hundreds of years. Apart from the Eastern Orthodox Bulgarians and Greeks, the mountains are also home to a number of Muslim communities, including the Pomaks, that predominate in the western parts and a large concentration of Bulgarian Turks and Greek Turks, particularly in the Eastern Rhodopes. The mountains are also one of the regions associated with the Sarakatsani, a nomadic Greek people who traditionally roamed between Northern Thrace and the Aegean coast. Aromanians, a Romance-speaking ethnic group, also live in the Rhodopes, and the Agupti who are a blend of Turks, Roma and Pomaks, but do not associate themselves with other Roma groups.

== See also ==
- Geography of Bulgaria
- List of mountains in Bulgaria
- List of mountains of the Balkans
- List of mountain ranges
- Mantaritza Biosphere Reserve
- Rila
- Pirin
- Balkan Mountains
- Vitosha
