= Kitchen Point =

Point on Tirizis Island, Antarctica

Location of Robert Island in the South Shetland Islands.

Topographic map of Livingston Island, Greenwich, Robert, Snow and Smith Islands.

Kitchen Point is a rocky point at the east end of Tirizis Island off the east coast of Robert Island in the South Shetland Islands, Antarctica. It is projecting into Bransfield Strait to form the southeast side of the entrance to Kozloduy Cove and the north side of the entrance to Kruni Cove.

The feature is named after the Captain Joseph Kitchen, Master of the British sealing ship Ann that visited the South Shetland Islands in 1821–22.

== Location ==
The point is located at 62°23′14.4″S 59°20′42″W which 7.25 km north by east of Robert Point, 1.9 km north (and marginally west) of Batuliya Point, 1.56 km southeast of Perelik Point, 2.75 km southeast of Smirnenski Point, and 12.33 km west-southwest of Ross Point, Nelson Island (Chilean mapping in 1951, British mapping in 1968, and Bulgarian in 2009).

== See also ==
- Robert Island
- South Shetland Islands

== Maps ==
- L.L. Ivanov. Antarctica: Livingston Island and Greenwich, Robert, Snow and Smith Islands. Scale 1:120000 topographic map. Troyan: Manfred Wörner Foundation, 2009. ISBN 978-954-92032-6-4
