= Brezovska reka =

Location
- Country: Bulgaria

Physical characteristics
- Source
  - location: SE of Bratan, Sredna Gora
  - coordinates: 42°29′53.88″N 25°10′4.08″E
  - elevation: 1,043 m (3,422 ft)
- Mouth
  - location: Maritsa
  - coordinates: 42°10′9.12″N 25°6′56.16″E
  - elevation: 131 m (430 ft)
- Length: 53 km (33 mi)
- Basin size: 237 km^{2} (92 sq mi)

Basin features
- Progression: Maritsa→ Aegean Sea

The Brezovska reka (Bulgarian: Брезовска река), formerly known as Rahmanliyska reka (Рахманлийска река), is a river in southern Bulgaria, a left tributary of the river Maritsa, with a length of 53 km.

The river takes its source under the name Poprashtenska reka at an altitude of 1,043 m at 1.1 km southeast of the summit of Bratan (1,236 m) in the mountain range of Sredna Gora. It flows southwest in a deep forested valley until the village of Rozovec. It then turns south and enters the Upper Thracian Plain at the town of Brezovo. The river flows into the Maritsa at an altitude of 131 m at 1.4 km west of the village of Mirovo.

Its drainage basin covers a territory of 237 km^{2} or 0.45% of the Maritsa's total and borders the drainage basins of the Srebra to the west and southwest, the Omurovska reka to the east and the Tundzha to the north, all of them left tributaries of the Maritsa.

The Brezovska reka has predominantly rain feed with high water in February–May and low water in July–October.

The river flows mostly in Plovdiv Province, with a short section at its mouth in Stara Zagora Province. There are four settlements along its course: the town of Brezovo and villages of Rozovets, Zelenikovo and Choba in Brezovo Municipality, Plovdiv Province. There two main roads along its valley, a 15 km stretch of the second class II-56 road Shipka–Brezovo–Plovdiv follows the river between Rozovets and Brezovo, and a 10 km section of the third class III-666 road Plodovitovo–Brezovo follows its valley between the village of Tyurkmen and Brezovo. Its waters are utilised for irrigation for the intensive agriculture in the Upper Thracian Plain.
