= Brezovo =

Brezovo, Plovdiv
- Location of Brezovo
- Coordinates: 42°21′N 25°5′E
- Country: Bulgaria
- Provinces (Oblast): Plovdiv

Government
  - Mayor: Mr Stoyan Minchev
- Elevation: 233 m (764 ft)

Population (15.6.2020)
  - Total: 1,735
- Time zone: UTC+2 (EET)
  - Summer (DST): UTC+3 (EEST)
- Postal Code: 4160
- Area code: 03191

Brezovo (Bulgarian: Брезово [ˈbrɛzovo]) is a town in Southern Bulgaria. It is located in Plovdiv oblast and is close to the town of Rakovski.

== Populated places ==
The following towns and villages are located inside the territory of Brezovo municipality:

- Babek
- Borets
- Brezovo
- Chehlare
- Choba
- Drangovo
- Otets Kirilovo
- Padarsko
- Rozovets
- Svezhen
- Streltsi
- Sarnegor
- Tyurkmen
- Varben
- Zelenikovo
- Zlatosel
