= Srebra =

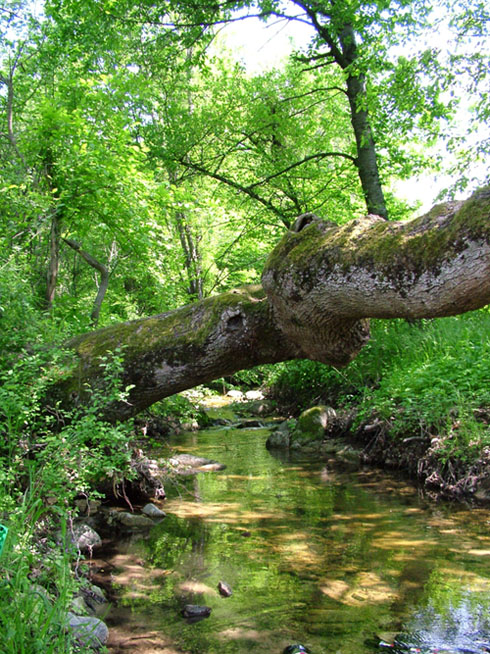

Location
- Country: Bulgaria

Physical characteristics
- Source
  - location: Gabrov Dol, Sredna Gora
  - coordinates: 42°29′11″N 25°1′16″E
  - elevation: 696 m (2,283 ft)
- Mouth
  - location: Maritsa
  - coordinates: 42°10′8″N 25°6′57″E
  - elevation: 131 m (430 ft)
- Length: 21 km (13 mi)
- Basin size: 68 km^{2} (26 sq mi)

Basin features
- Progression: Maritsa→ Aegean Sea

The Srebra (Bulgarian: Сребра), also known as the Azmak (Азмак) is a river in southern Bulgaria, a left tributary of the river Maritsa, with a length of 21 km.

The river takes its source under the name Zlatoselska reka at an altitude of 696 m at 1.7 km southwest of the village of Svezhen in the mountain range of Sredna Gora. In its upper course it flows in a deep forested valley, covered with mixed deciduous forests of Austrian oak (Quercus cerris), Hungarian oak (Quercus frainetto) and pubescent oak (Quercus pubescens), with Mediterranean species such as prickly juniper (Juniperus oxycedrus). There are also shrubs of Jerusalem thorn (Paliurus spina-christi), common lilac (Syringa vulgaris), dwarf everlast (Helichrysum arenarium) and blackberries (Rubus fruticosus).

The Srebra then flows into the Dondukovo Reservoir and enters the Upper Thracian Plain at the village of Zlatosel. It flows southwards from its source to the town of Rakovski and then turns in southeastern direction, passing through the village of Belozem. It flows into the Maritsa at an altitude of 131 m at 1.4 km west of the village of Mirovo.

Its drainage basin covers a territory of 68 km^{2} or 0.12% of the Maritsa's total and borders the drainage basins of the Stryama to the west and southwest and the Brezovska reka to the east, both left tributaries of the Maritsa.

The Srebra has predominantly rain feed with high water in January–May and low water in July–October. The average annual flow is only 0.28 m^{3}/s due to the intensive use of the water for irrigation.

The river flows mostly in Plovdiv Province, with a short section at its mouth in Stara Zagora Province. There are six settlements along its course: the villages of Zlatosel, Drangovo and Otets Kirilovo in Brezovo Municipality and the town of Rakovski and villages of Shishmantsi and Belozem in Rakovski Municipality, all of them in Plovdiv Province. Almost all of the river's waters are utilised for irrigation for the intensive agriculture in the Upper Thracian Plain.
