= Brezovo Municipality =

Coordinates: 42°21′00″N 25°04′59″E

Brezovo Municipality Община Брезово
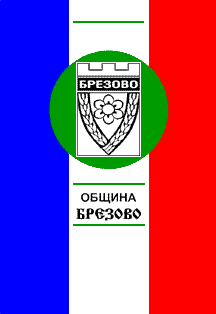
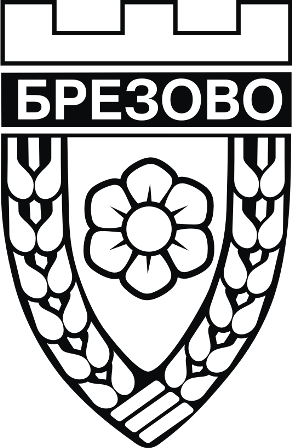
- Flag Coat of arms

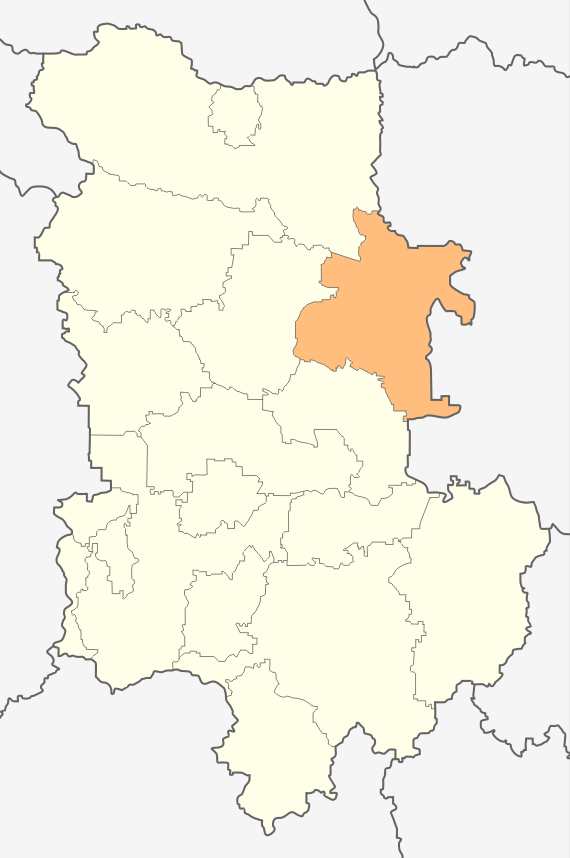
- Country: Bulgaria
- Province: Plovdiv Province
- Seat: Brezovo

Area
  - Total: 465.4 km^{2} (179.7 sq mi)

Population (2024)
  - Total: 5,788
  - Density: 12.44/km^{2} (32.21/sq mi)
- Website: brezovo.egov.bg/wps/portal/municipality-brezovo/home

Brezovo Municipality (Bulgarian: Община Брезово) is a municipality in Plovdiv Province, central Bulgaria. Covering a territory of 465.4 km^{2}, it is the sixth largest of the 18 municipalities in the province, encompassing 7.77% of its total area. It borders the municipalities of Rakovski to the south, Kaloyanovo to the west, Karlovo to the northwest, Pavel Banya to the north, and Bratya Daskalovi to the east, the latter two belonging to the Stara Zagora Province. It lies 44 km north of the regional center Plovdiv and 174 km east of the national capital Sofia.

== Geography ==
The terrain of the municipality is flat, hilly and mountainous. Its southern reaches fall within the northern parts of the Upper Thracian Plain with an elevation between 200 m and 300 m, the municipality’s lowest altitude at 171 m is situated there. To north are the southern slopes of the Sredna Gora mountain range with the summit of Bratan (1,155 m), which constitutes the highest municipal point.

Brezovo Municipality falls within the transitional continental climatic zone. It is drained by upper and middles courses of several left tributaries of the Maritsa of the Aegean Sea drainage, the most significant of these being the Brezovska reka and the Srebra, which flow in general direction north–south and are diverted in numerous irrigation canals. Its northernmost areas are drained by the Svezhenska reka, a left tributary of the Byala reka of the Stryama basin, which also belongs to the Maritsa river system.

== Transport ==
Brezovo Municipality is traversed by four roads of the national network with a total length of 58.2 km, including a 26.3 km section of the second class II-56 road Shipka–Plovdiv, the last 3.3 km of the third class III-664 road, the last 10.6 km of the third class III-666 road, and the first 18 km of the third class III-5604 road. With the addition of the local roads, the total length of the road network reaches 178.8 km.

== Demography ==
The population is 5,788 as of 2024.

There are 15 villages and one town in Brezovo Municipality:

- Babek
- Borets
- Brezovo
- Chehlare
- Choba
- Drangovo
- Otets Kirilovo
- Padarsko
- Rozovets
- Svezhen
- Streltsi
- Sarnegor
- Tyurkmen
- Varben
- Zelenikovo
- Zlatosel

== Gallery ==
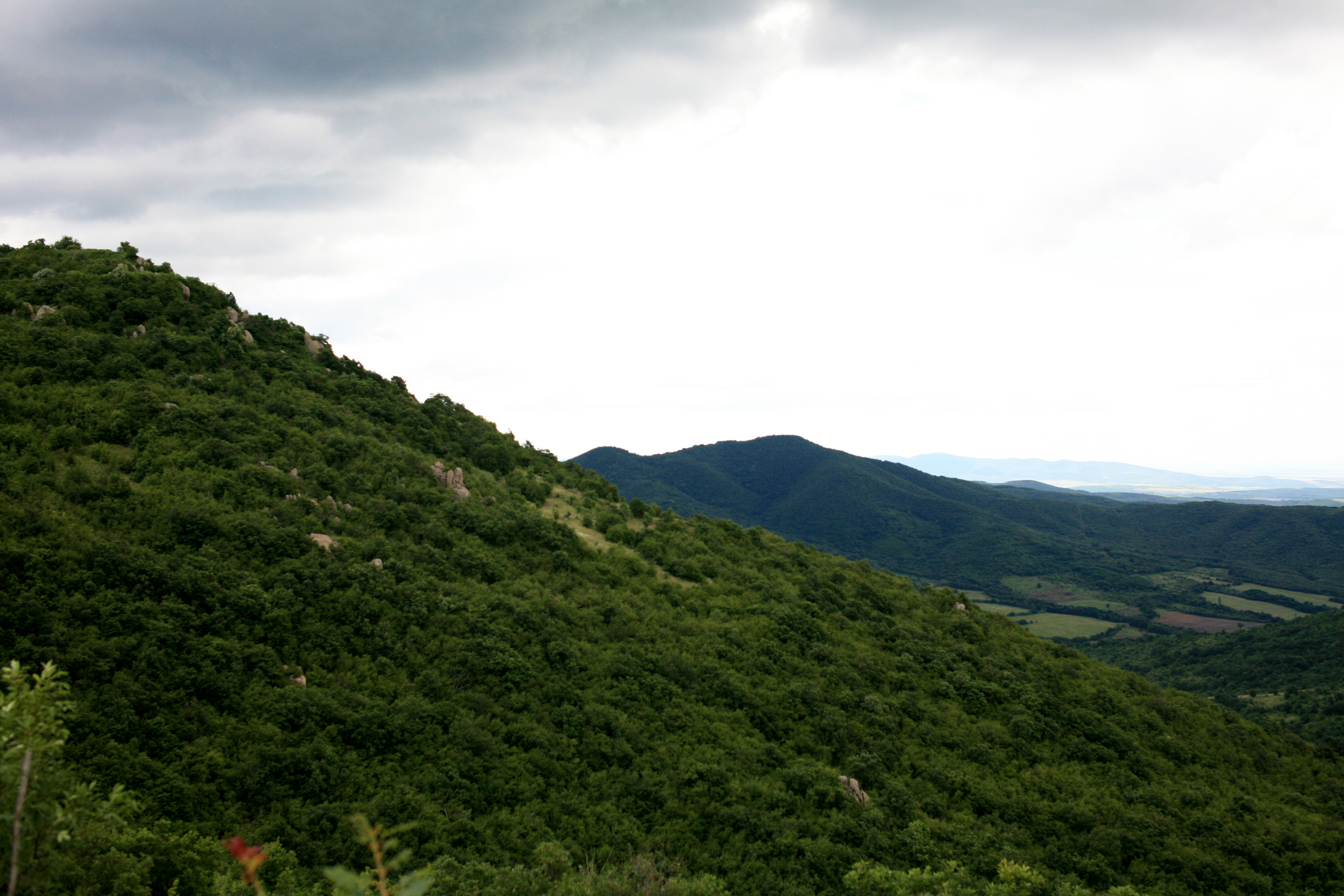
Sredna Gora near Rosovets

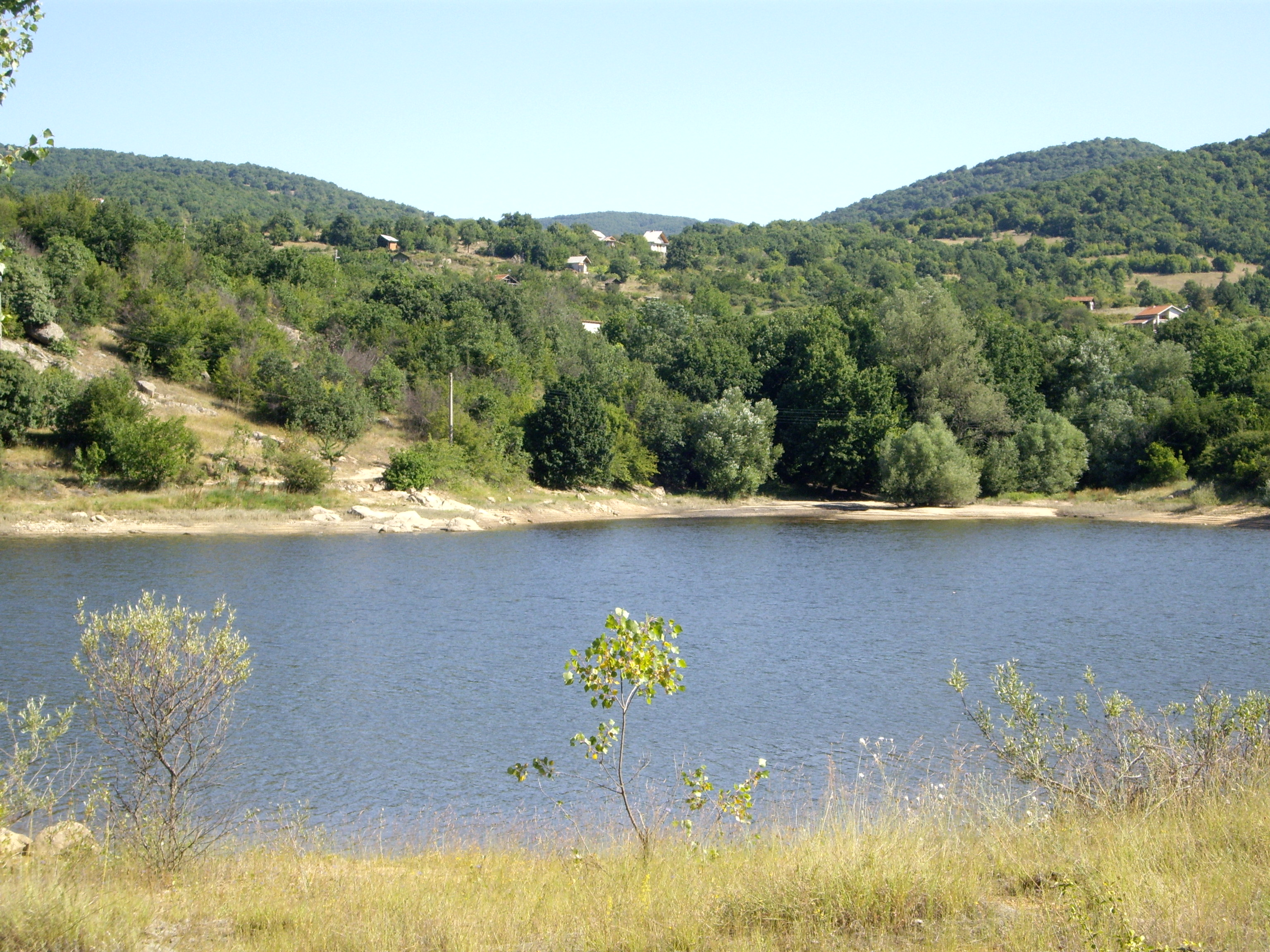
Dondukovo Reservoir

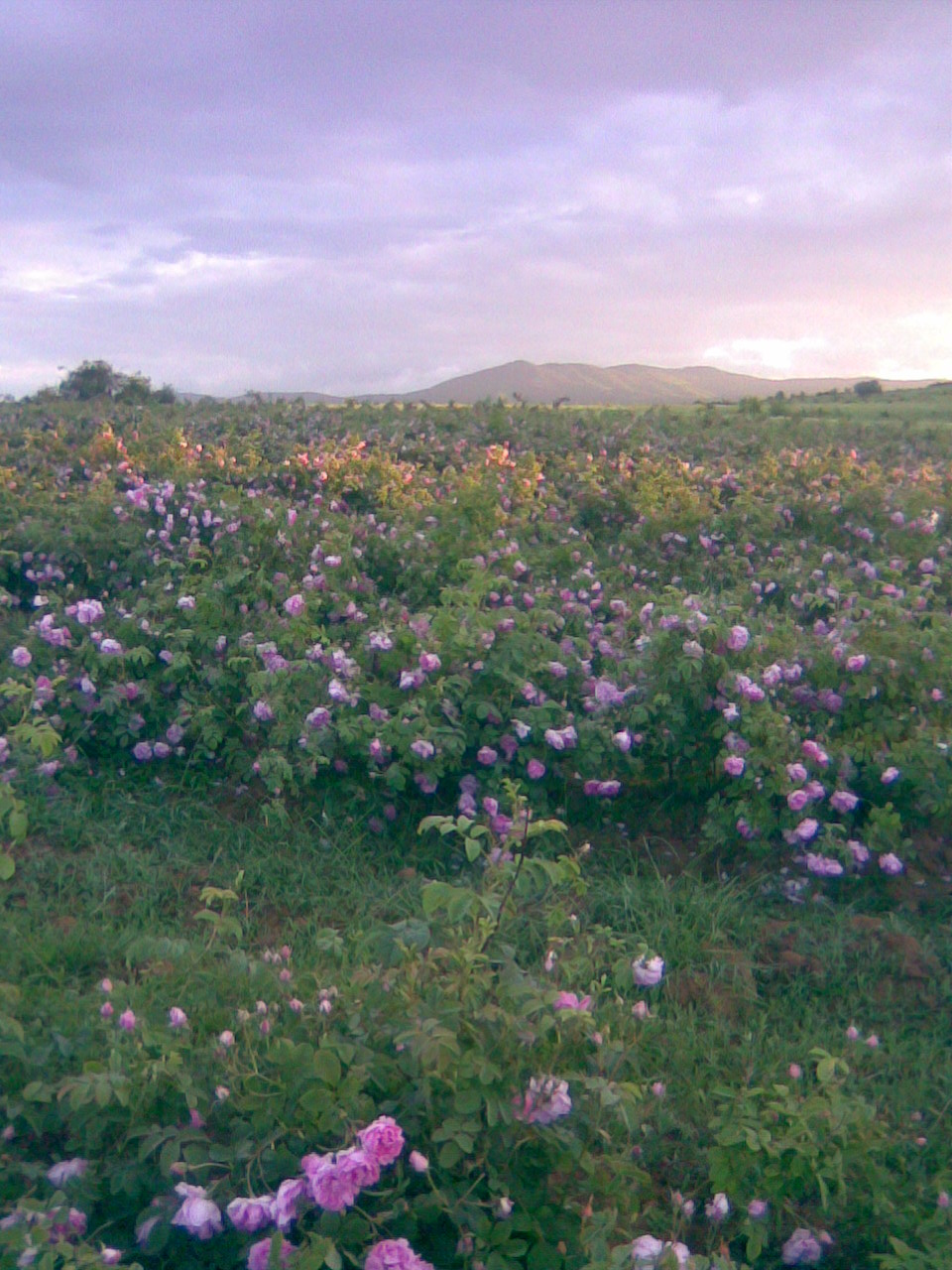
Rosa × damascena fields near Varben

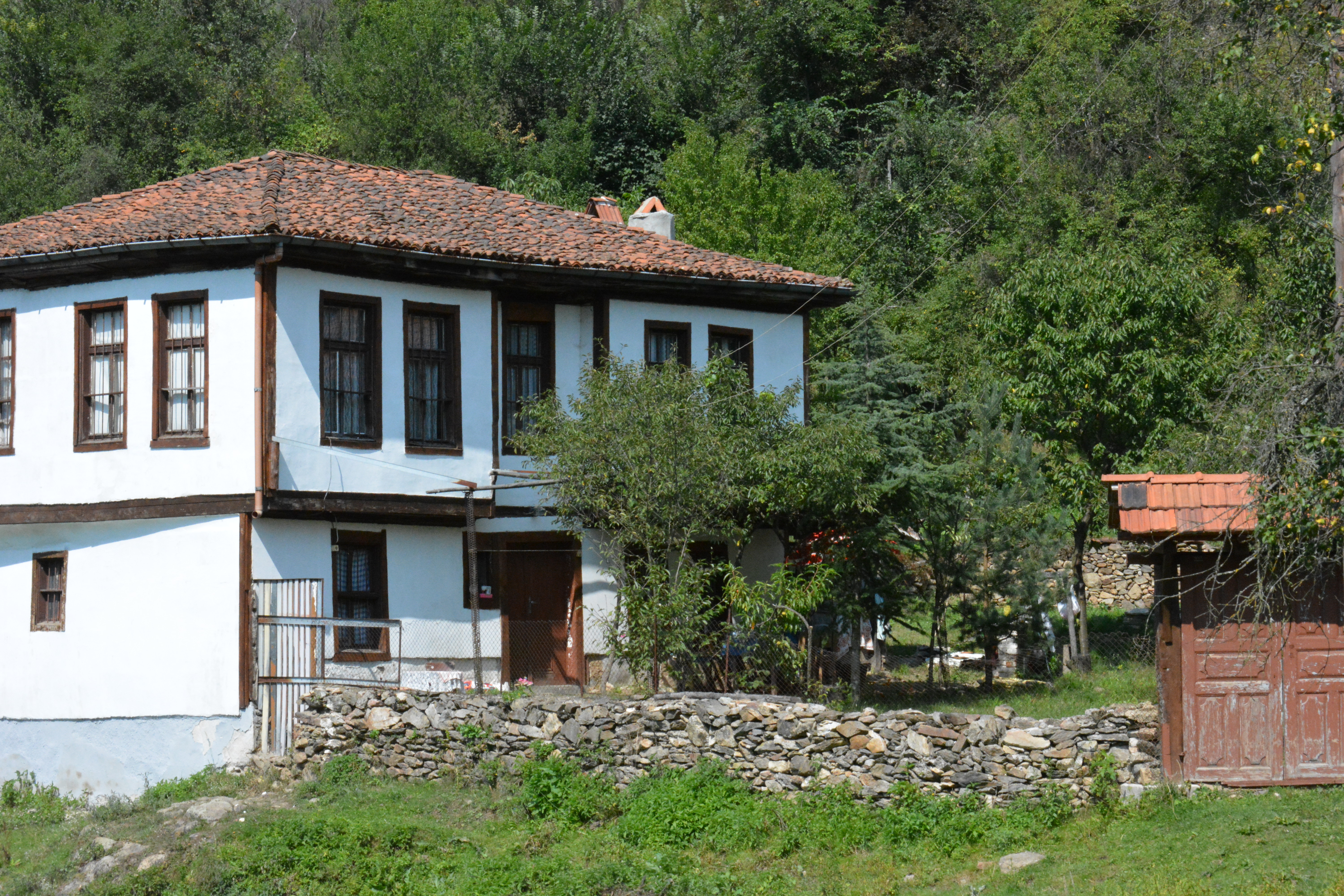
An old house in Svezhen

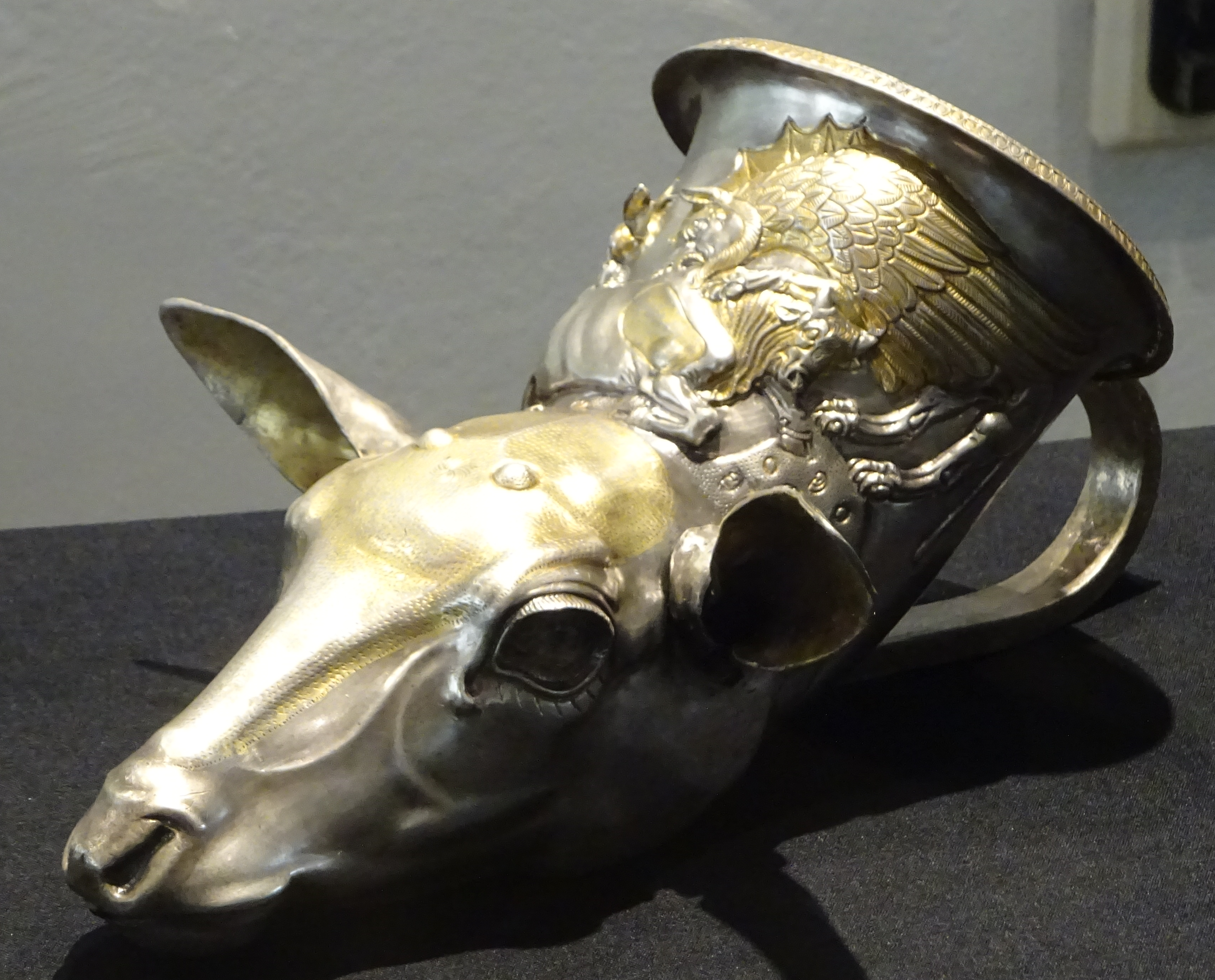
A Thracian rhyton found near Rosovets
