= Varben, Plovdiv Province =

Varben Върбен
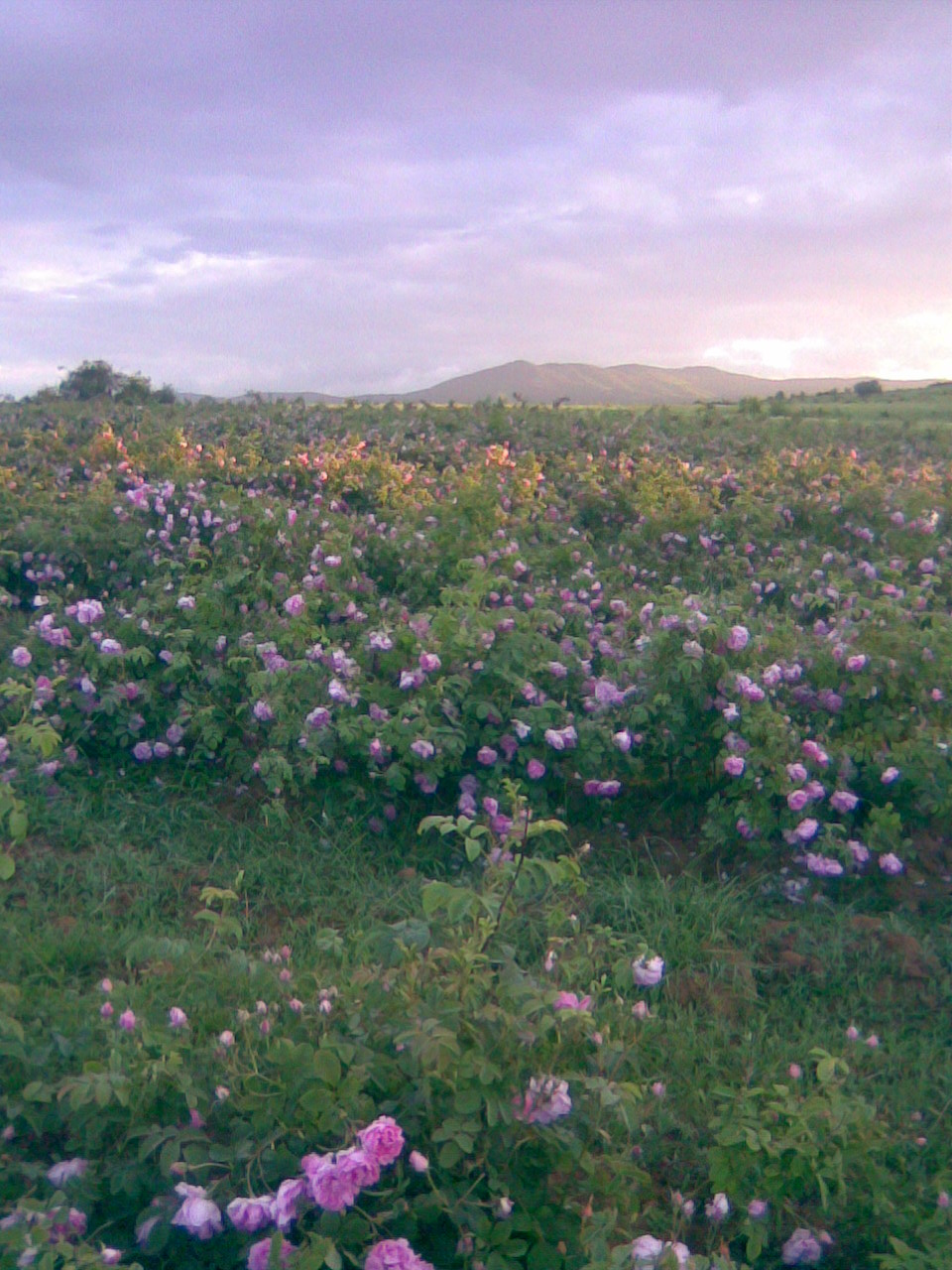
- Rosa × damascene fields near Varben

- Location of Varben, Bulgaria
- Coordinates: 42°25′23.14″N 24°58′2.1″E
- Country: Bulgaria
- Provinces (Oblast): Plovdiv Province

Government
  - Mayor: Yordan Hristev
- Elevation: 326 m (1,070 ft)

Population (15.09.2022)
  - Total: 147
- Time zone: UTC+2 (EET)
  - Summer (DST): UTC+3 (EEST)
- Postal Code: 4145
- Area codes: 03190 from Bulgaria, 003593190 from outside

Varben (Bulgarian: Върбен) is a village in central Bulgaria. It has a population of 147 as of 2022. It was established by refugees from the village of Poibrene, after the Ottomans quelled the April Uprising of 1876.

== Geography ==
Varben is located in Plovdiv Province and has a territory of 31.494 km^{2}. It is part of Brezovo Municipality. It is situated some 45 km northeast of Bulgaria's second largest city Plovdiv. The nearest villages are Sarnegor to the northwest, Strelets to the southwest and Zlatosel to the east.

Varben is situated at the southern foothills of the Sredna Gora mountain range facing the Upper Thracian Plain.

== Economy ==
The village is situated in a fertile agricultural region. The main crops include orchards and grapes. The most important livestock are cattle, sheep and goats.
