= Omurovska reka =

Location
- Country: Bulgaria

Physical characteristics
- Source
  - location: Chakalova Polyana, Sredna Gora
  - coordinates: 42°29′30.84″N 25°11′58.92″E
  - elevation: 820 m (2,690 ft)
- Mouth
  - location: Maritsa
  - coordinates: 42°7′57″N 25°14′20.04″E
  - elevation: 120 m (390 ft)
- Length: 58 km (36 mi)
- Basin size: 305 km^{2} (118 sq mi)

Basin features
- Progression: Maritsa→ Aegean Sea

The Omurovska reka (Bulgarian: Омуровска река) is a river in southern Bulgaria, a left tributary of the river Maritsa, with a length of 58 km.

The river takes its source under the name Konakdere at an altitude of 820 m at 1 km northeast of the summit of Chakalova Polyana (902 m) in the mountain range of Sredna Gora. It flows southwards through the western and southwestern parts of the Chirpan Heights in a narrow valley with alternating widenings, where there are several villages. The river enters the Upper Thracian Plain at the village of Partizanin. Its valley becomes wide and shallow and is protected by dikes. The Omurovska reka flows into the Maritsa at an altitude of 120 m at 0.65 km south of the village of Krushevo.

Its drainage basin covers a territory of 305 km^{2} or 0.58% of the Maritsa's total and borders the drainage basins of the Brezovska reka to the west, the Sazliyka and the Tekirovska reka to the east, and the Tundzha to the north, all of them left tributaries of the Maritsa.

The Omurovska reka has predominantly rain feed with high water in March–June and low water in July–December. The average annual discharge is 0.85 m^{3}/s at the village of Partizanin.

The river flows mostly in Stara Zagora Province, with a short section at its mouth in Plovdiv Province. There are ten villages along its course: Medovo, Markovo, Malak Dol, Golyam Dol, Bratya Daskalovi, Gorno Belevo, Partizanin, Cherna Gora and Plodovitovo in Stara Zagora Province, and Krushevo in Plovdiv Province. There three main roads along its valley, a 3.7 km stretch of the third class III-565 road Plovdiv–Belozem–Partizanin follows the river between Cherna Gora and Partizanin, and a 9.7 km section of the third class III-664 road Chirpan–Bratya Daskalovi–Brezovo follows its valley between Partizanin and Bratya Daskalovi, and a 3.9 km part of the third class III-667 road Plodovitovo–Parvomay–Asenovgrad follows it between Plodovitovo and Gradina. Its waters are utilised for irrigation for the intensive agriculture in the Upper Thracian Plain.
