= II-56 road (Bulgaria) =

Road in Bulgaria

Republic Road I-56
- Републикански път I-56

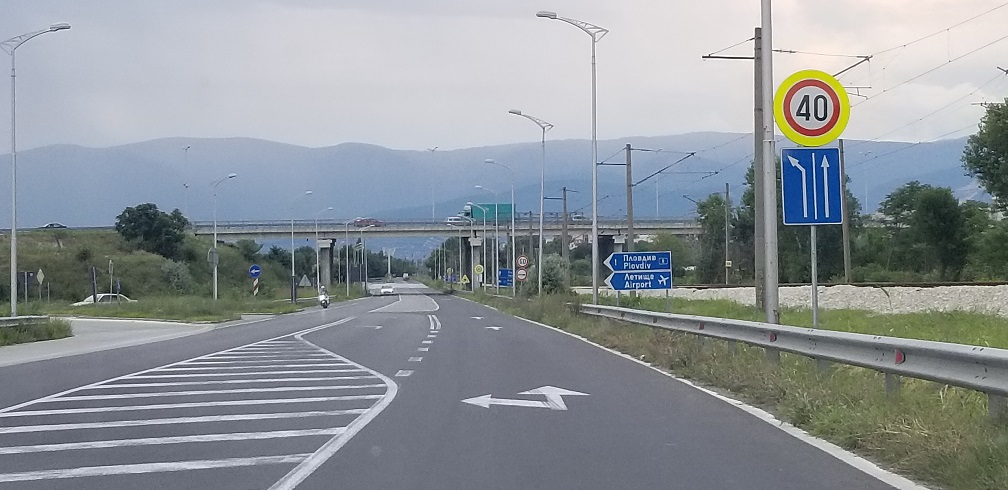
- II-56 at its terminus in Plovdiv

Route information
- Length: 100.1 km (62.2 mi)

Major junctions
- From: Km 181.8 of I-5, Shipka
- To: Km 228.2 of I-8, Plovdiv

Location
- Country: Bulgaria
- Towns: Shipka, Pavel Banya, Brezovo, Rakovski, Plovdiv

Highway system
- Highways in Bulgaria

Republican Road II-56 (Bulgarian: Републикански път II-56) is a 2nd class road in Bulgaria, running in direction northeast–southwest through the territory of Stara Zagora and Plovdiv Provinces. Its length is 100.1 km.

== Route description ==
The road starts at Km 181.8 of the first class I-5 road in the southeastern part of the town of Shipka and heads southwest through the Kazanlak Valley. It passes through the village of Gorno Saharane, forms a junction at Km 303.3 of the first class I-6 road, crosses the river Tundzha and reaches the spa town of Pavel Banya. From the town the route follows the valley of the Turiyska reka, a right tributary of the Tundzha, runs through the village of Turia, turns south and continues upstream along the Turiyska reka valley, reaching the Sveti Nikola Pass near the river source in the Sredna Gora mountain range. After the pass the II-56 road enters Plovdiv Province and descends along the southern slopes of Sredna Gora. At the village of Rozovets it enters the Upper Thracian Plain and passes through Zelenikovo, Brezovo, Rakovski, Stryama and Kalekovets. After Kalekovets the road forms a junction with the Trakia motorway at the latter's Km 134 and enters city of Plovdiv from the northeast, where it reaches its terminus at Km 228.2 of the first class I-8 road.
