= Rakovski Municipality =

Coordinates: 42°18′N 24°58′E

Rakovski Municipality Община Раковски
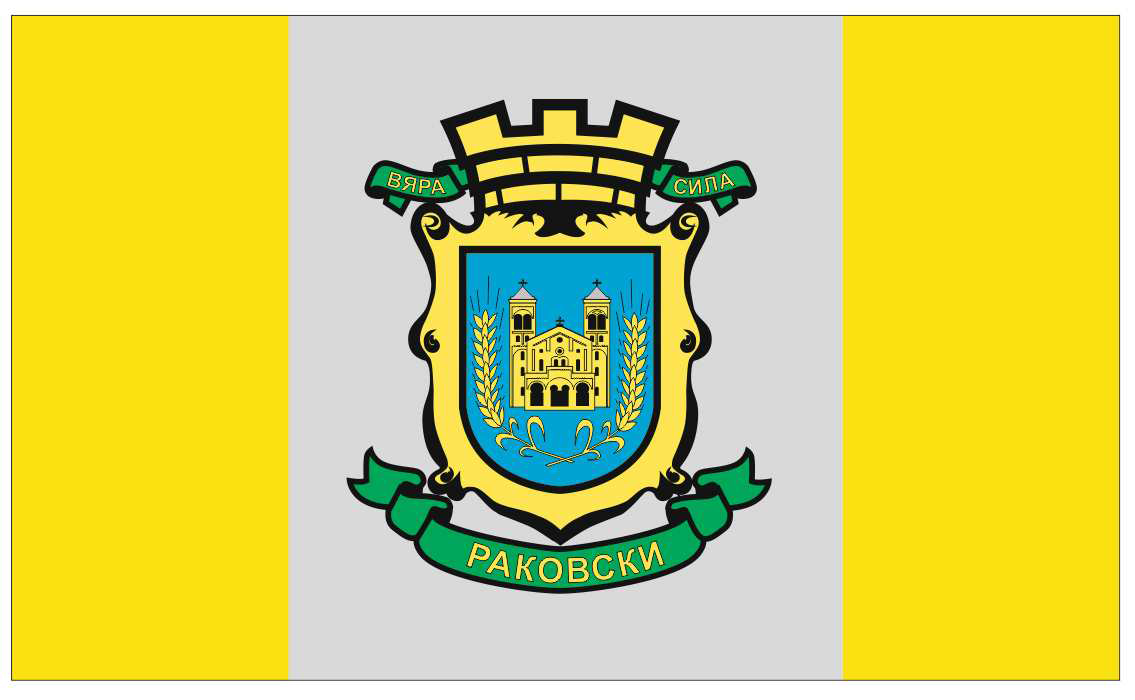
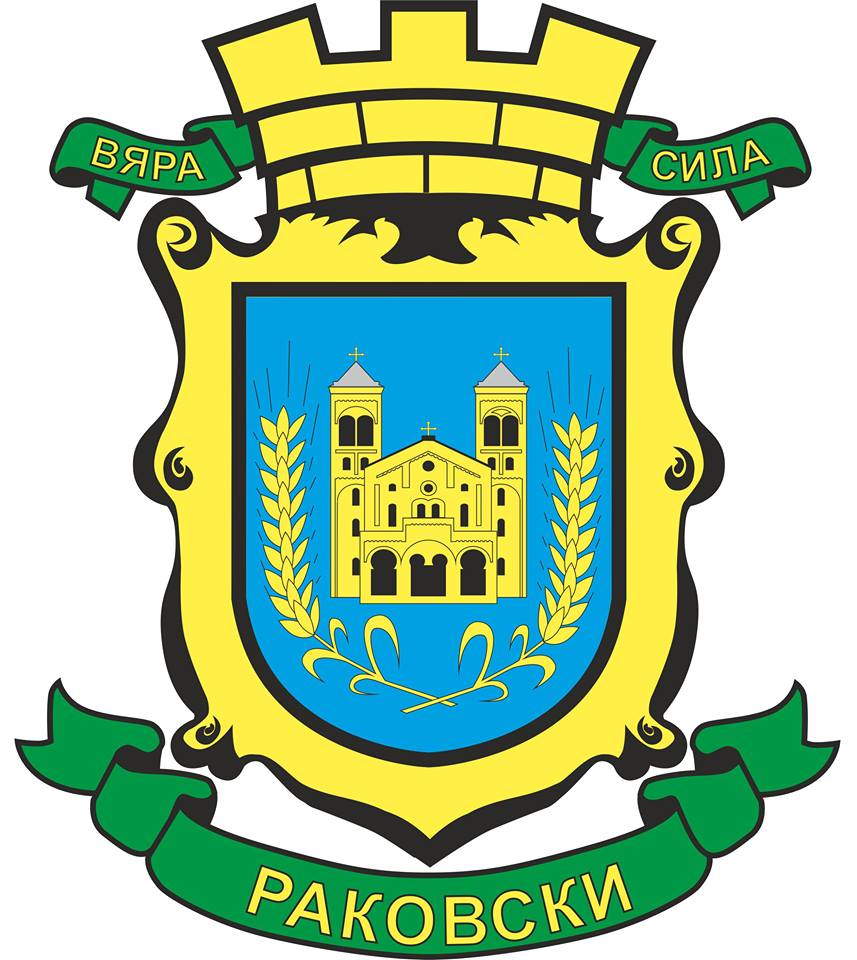
- Flag Coat of arms

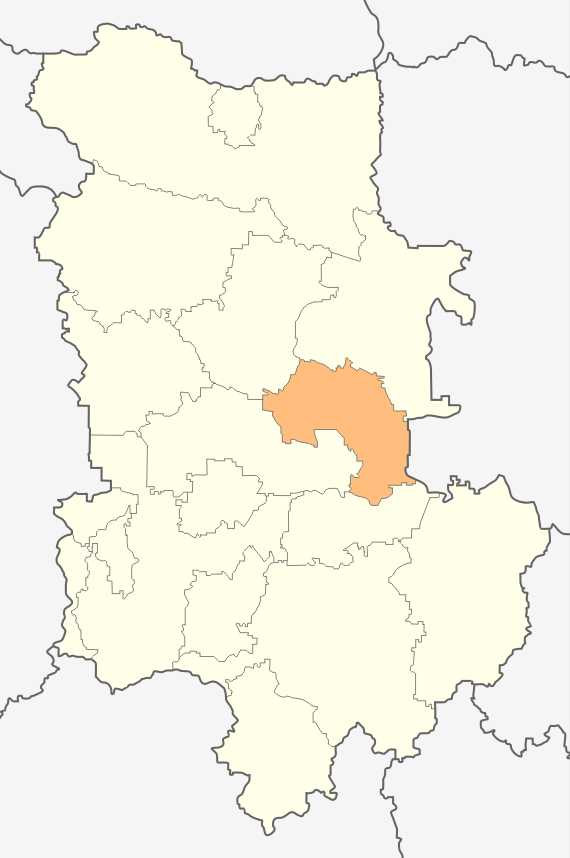
- Country: Bulgaria
- Province: Plovdiv Province
- Seat: Rakovski

Area
  - Total: 265 km^{2} (102 sq mi)

Population (2024)
  - Total: 25,389
  - Density: 95.8/km^{2} (248/sq mi)
- Website: www.rakovski.bg

Rakovski Municipality (Bulgarian: Община Раковски) is a municipality in Plovdiv Province, central Bulgaria. Covering a territory of 265 km^{2}, it is the 11th largest of the 18 municipalities in the province, encompassing 4.4% of its total area. It borders the municipalities of Sadovo to the south, Maritsa to the west and southwest, Kaloyanovo to the west and northwest, Brezovo to the north and northeast, and Bratya Daskalovi to the east, the latter belonging to Stara Zagora Province.

== Geography ==
The municipality has a flat topography and is characterized by uniform alluvial soil, mostly covered with fine clayey sand. It is situated in the northeastern part of the Pazardzhik–Plovdiv Field, which constitutes the western half of the Upper Thracian Plain. The relieve is one of the flattest and most uniform in the nation with an average altitude of some 180 m, lowest point at 132 m in the south, highest point at 214 m in the northern part, and a total denivelation of only 82 m.

Rakovski Municipality falls within the transitional continental climatic zone. Along its southern border with Sadovo Municipality flows a 12 km section of the river Maritsa of the Aegean Sea drainage, with the municipal territory spanning north of the river. It is drained by the lower course of several of the Maritsa’s left tributaries, the most important being the Stryama and the Srebra. There are numerous irrigation canals.

== Economy ==
The economic backbone of the municipality is the Rakovski Industrial Zone, one of the six divisions of the major Trakia Economic Zone, spanning over 1,000,000 m^{2}. It hosts several factories and logistics centers, belonging to companies such as ABB, Magna International, Kaufland, Zobele, William Hughs, Brunata, etc. producing electronics, automotive components, chemicals, food. In addition at the village of Belozem are located the manufacturing facilities and the terminal for crude oil and petroleum products of Insa Oil, producing lubricants, oils and preservation products for various industrial sectors.

== Transport ==
Rakovski Municipality is traversed by three roads of the national network with a total length of 36.8 km, including an 8.5 km section of the Trakiya motorway (A1) connecting the capital Sofia and the Black Sea port of Burgas, a 15.3 km section of the second class II-56 road Shipka–Plovdiv, and a 13 km stretch of the third class III-565 road. With the addition of the local roads, the total municipal network reaches 108.3 km.

In the southern part of its territory runs a 6 km section of railway line No. 8 Plovdiv–Burgas.

== Demography ==
The population is 25,389 as of 2024.

There are six villages and one town in Rakovski Municipality:

- Belozem
- Bolyarino
- Chalakovi
- Momino Selo
- Rakovski
- Shishmantsi
- Stryama

== Gallery ==
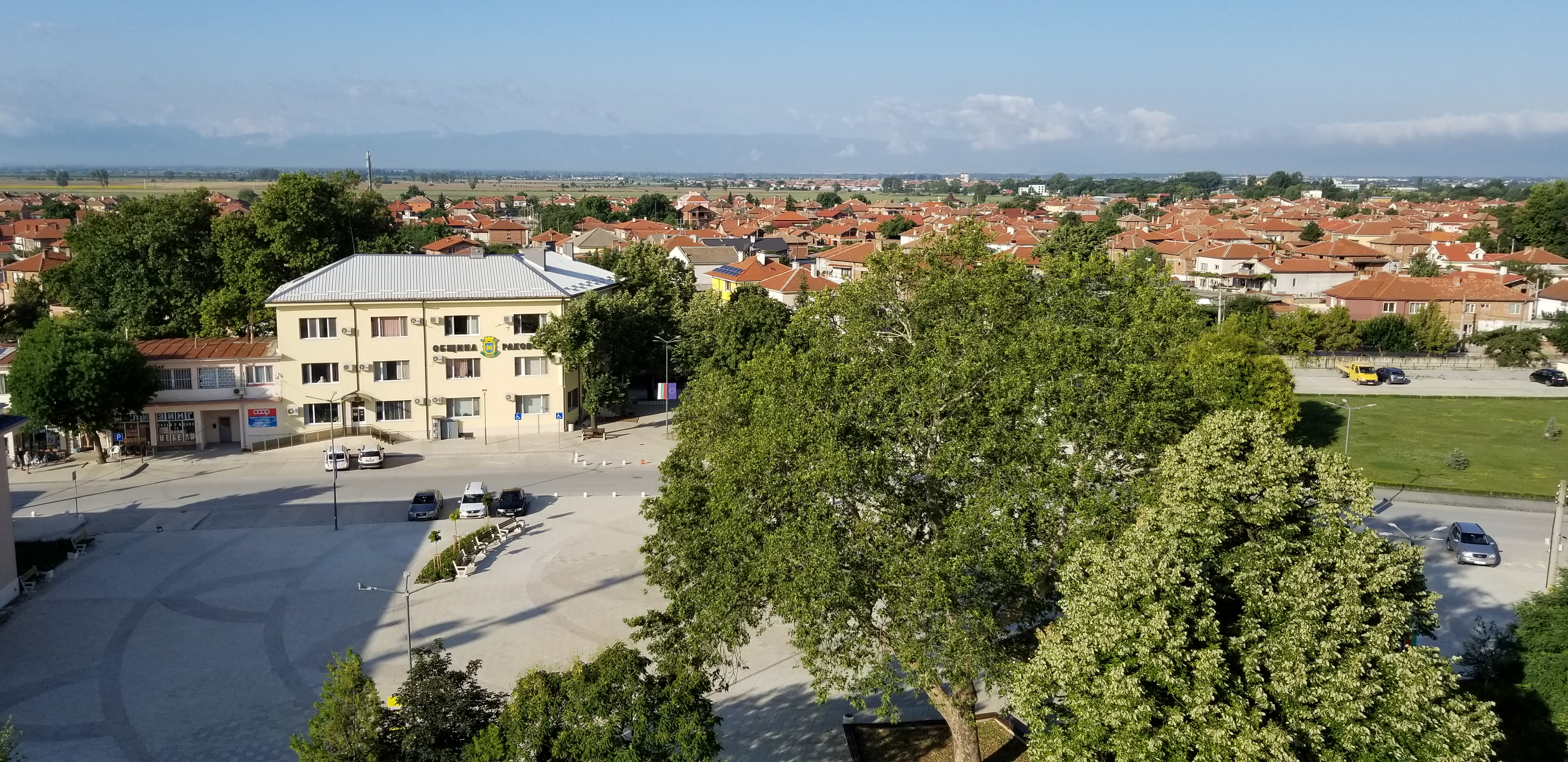
A view of Rakovski

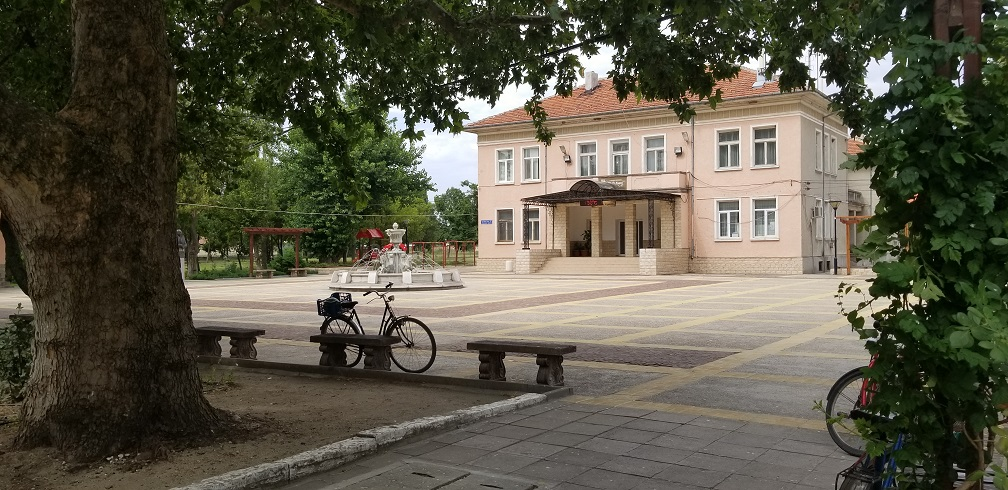
The main square of Shishmantsi

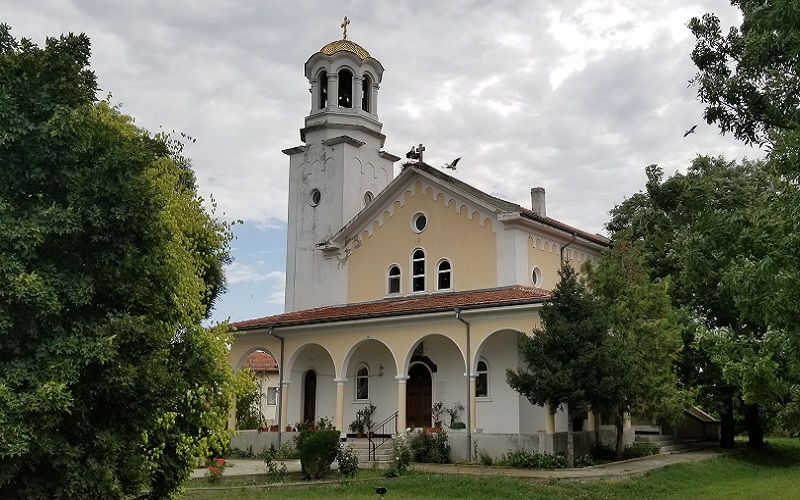
Church of St. George, Belozem

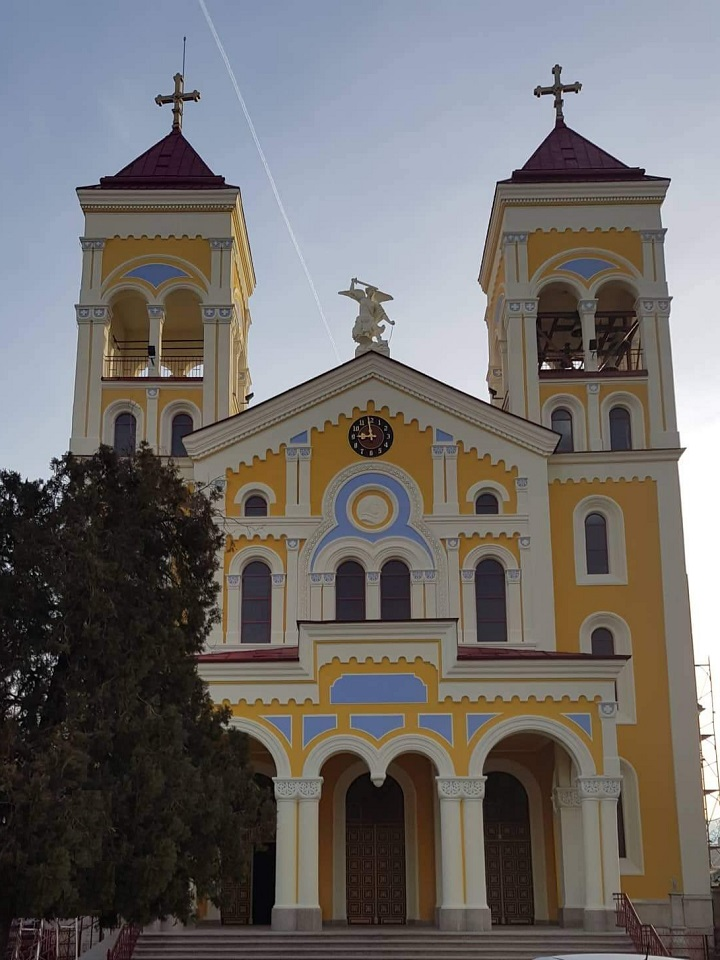
Church of St. Archangel Michael, Rakovski
