= Borets =

- Village
- Борец
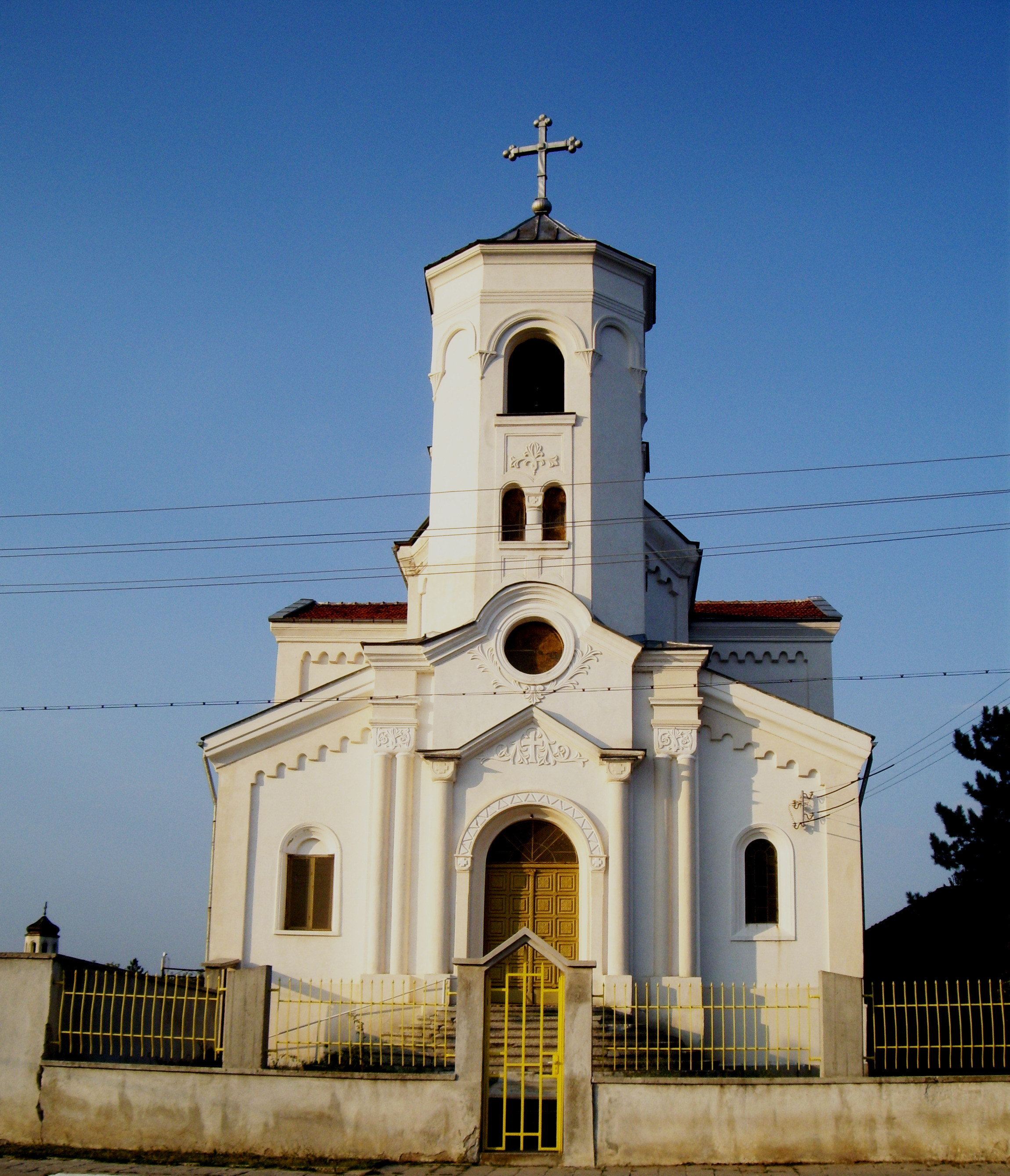
- Borets Catholic Church

- Location within Bulgaria
- Coordinates: 42.333333°N 24.933333°E
- Country: Bulgaria
- Province: Plovdiv Province
- Municipality: Brezovo Municipality

Government
  - Mayor: Hristo Enkov

Population
  - Total: 699
- Postal code: 4144

Borets is a village in Southern Bulgaria, in Brezovo Municipality, Plovdiv Province. Its population is 699 people as of 2020.

== Geography ==
Borets is located 37 kilometers northeast of Plovdiv, 16 kilometers west of Brezovo and 14 kilometers northwest of Rakovski. It has an average altitude of 200 meters above sea level. The climate in the area is moderate. During winter the average temperature is around 0ºС, while during summer it averages around 26ºС. In the Brezovo municipality there are 82 dams, making the area a centre of water sports and water tourism.

Pavel Banya, a mineral springs touristic town, is located around 57 kilometers northeast of the village.

Borets has a community center, library, Catholic church and school.

== Notable people ==
- Bozhana Zlatanova, key Bulgarian figure in socialist labour
- Vasil Pramatarski, (1883 - ?), active member of the Internal Macedonian Revolutionary Organization, and a participant in the Dimitar Tashev's war party.

== Public institutions ==
- School "Sv. Sv. Kiril i Metodii", which in 2004 became 120 years old. The first ever school teacher to take part of the school was Nikola Ivanov Kibarski.
- Community Hall and library "Luch", which is entitled to organize cultural events in the village.
- Two Christian temples, a Catholic church "Sveti Anton" and an Orthodox church "Sv. sv Kiril i Metodii"
