= Babek, Plovdiv Province =

Babek
- Village
- Babek
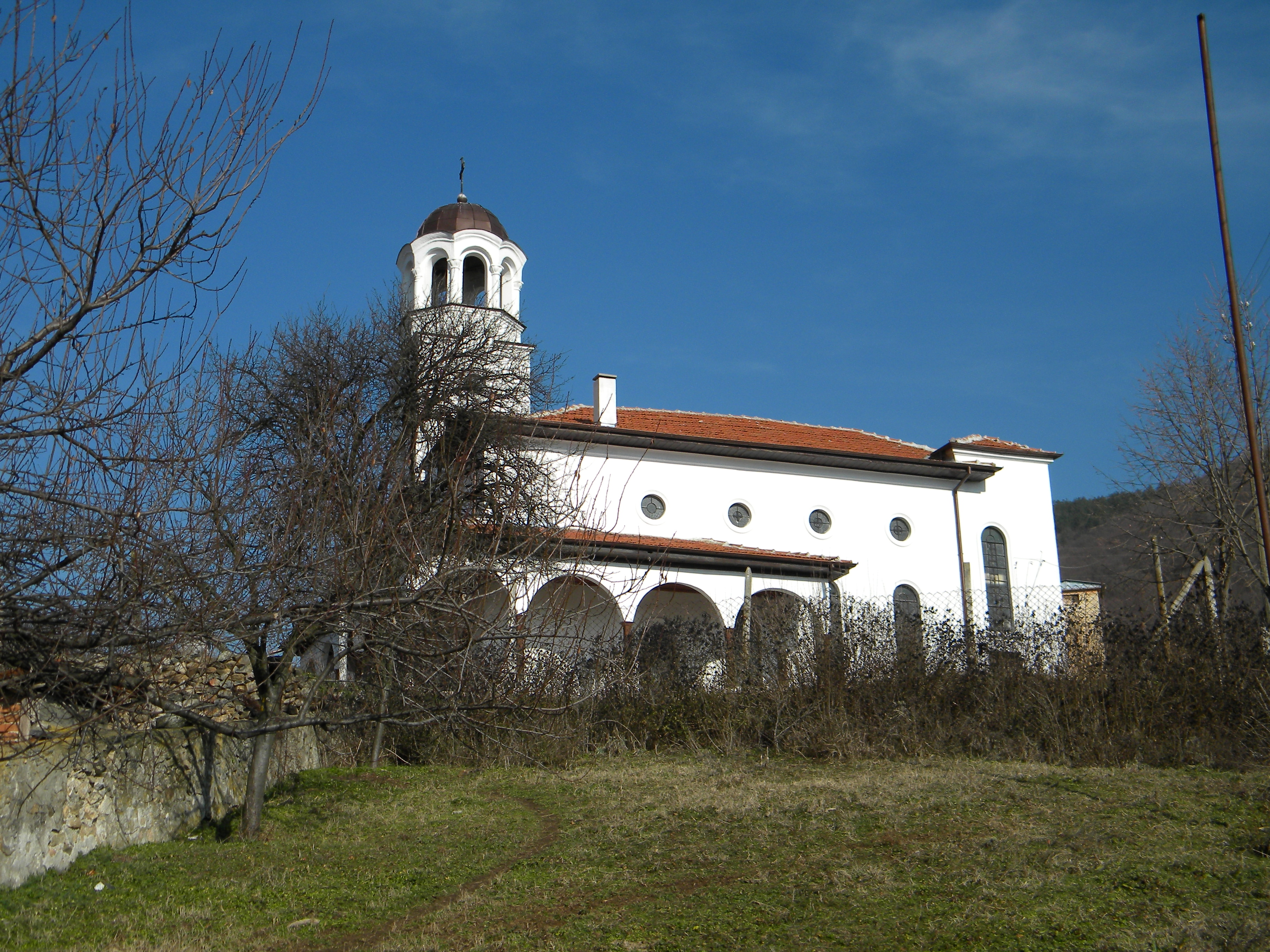
- The Church in Babek

- Location within Bulgaria
- Coordinates: 42.4422°N 25.0747°E
- Country: Bulgaria
- Province: Plovdiv
- Municipality: Brezovo Municipality

Area
  - Total: 16,759 km^{2} (6,471 sq mi)

Population
  - Total: 42
- Postal code: 4156
- Area code: 03192

Babek (Bulgarian: Бабек) is a village in southern Bulgaria, in Brezovo Municipality, Plovdiv Province. The current population count of the village is 42 people as of 2020.

== Geography ==
Babek is located in Sredna Gora mountain range, north of Svezhen village, and east of Rozovec village. The western neighboring village of Babek is Zlatosel and the southern one is Zelenikovo. The climate and soil conditions are favourable for the cultivation of oil roses and different essential oil crops.

== History and culture ==
During the Balkan Wars, one person from Babek village volunteered in the Bulgarian army during 1912. The majority of the population are Orthodox Christians in terms of religious beliefs. It is believed that the village has been moved a few times in a perimeter between 5 and 7 kilometers. The reason for the relocation has been stated to be attacks under the Ottoman rule over Bulgaria (1396-1878). Local legends believe that the formation of the village started due to an old woman relocating with her sons in the area. Hence the name "Babek" coming out of the Bulgarian word "Baba" which means grandmother.

=== Notable people ===
- General Banko Pironkov, a World War II hero
- Stefan Shivachev
- Tsvetana Pironkova, a notable Bulgarian tennis player.
