= Chernokonevo =

Neighbourhood of Dimitrovgrad, Bulgaria

Coordinates: 42°4′16.83″N 25°31′5.96″E

Chernokonevo (in Bulgarian: Черноконево) is a neighbourhood of Dimitrovgrad, Bulgaria. And one of the ground villages that Dimitrovgrad is created on. The other two is Rakovski and Mariyno. Many people call Chernokonevo "Karatli" (in Bulgarian "Каратли"). Its population is about 3500 people.

The village is also known as "Malak Batak" which means Little Slough in Bulgarian because of the bloody events during the Russo-Turkish War when it was completely destroyed by the Turks, and the population was subjected to the unscrupulous massacre.

It has a long history; however, it is not well known outside of Dimitrovgrad. Many people from other parts of Dimitrovgrad go to Chernokonevo, mostly to work. Many adults live in Chernokonevo and the teenagers live in Dimitrovgrad.
