= Pyasachnik Reservoir =

Reservoir in Bulgaria

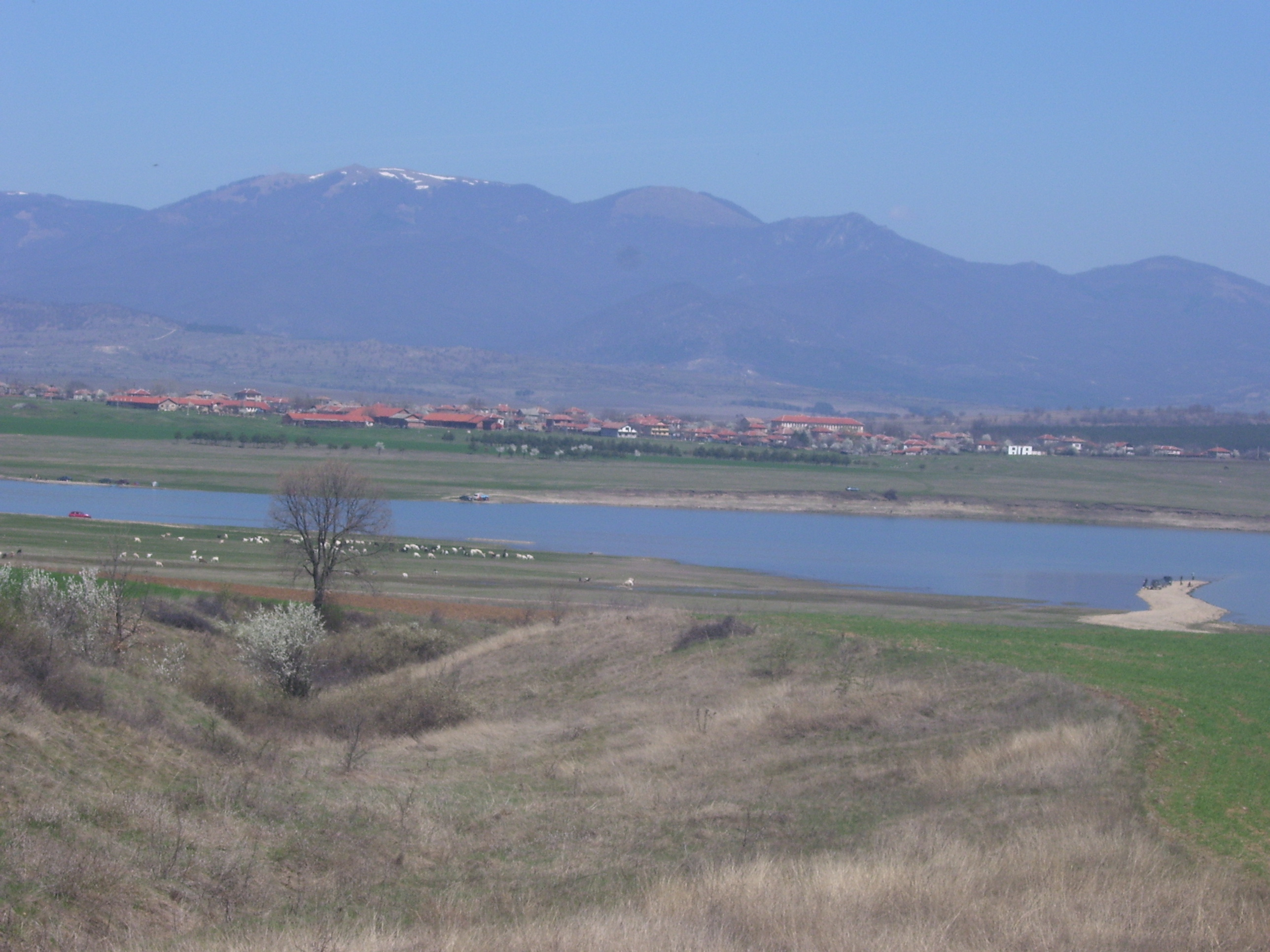

- Location within Bulgaria
- Location: Upper Thracian Plain
- Coordinates: 42°23′17.16″N 24°34′53.04″E
- Type: dam
- Primary outflows: Pyasachnik river
- Basin countries: Bulgaria
- Surface area: 9.1 km^{2} (3.5 sq mi)
- Water volume: 206.53 hm^{3} (7.294×10^{9} cu ft)
- Surface elevation: 289 m (948 ft)

The Pyasachnik Reservoir (Bulgarian: язовир Пясъчник) is located in the northwestern part of Upper Thracian Plain in southern central Bulgaria, along the river Pyasachnik, a left tributary of the Maritsa. It is situated northwest of the village of Lyuben in Plovdiv Province. The reservoir covers an area of 9.1 km^{2} and has a volume of 206.53 million m^{3}. Pyasachnik Reservoir was constructed in 1958–1964. Its waters are used for the irrigation of about 270 km^{2} arable land.

The reservoir is a popular fishing area. The International Game Fish Association world record for a grass carp caught on hook was set in Pyasachnik Reservoir in 2009 — 39.75 kg (87.6 lb).
