= Bolyarino =

Bolyarino Болярино
- Location within Bulgaria
- Coordinates: 42°13′58.8″N 25°03′0″E
- Country: Bulgaria
- Province: Plovdiv
- Municipality: Rakovski

Area
  - Total: 26,531 km^{2} (10,244 sq mi)
- Elevation: 167 m (548 ft)

Population (Census December 2010)
  - Total: 434
- Time zone: UTC+2 (EET)
  - Summer (DST): UTC+3 (EEST)
- Postal code: 4132
- Area code: 03157
- Vehicle registration: PB

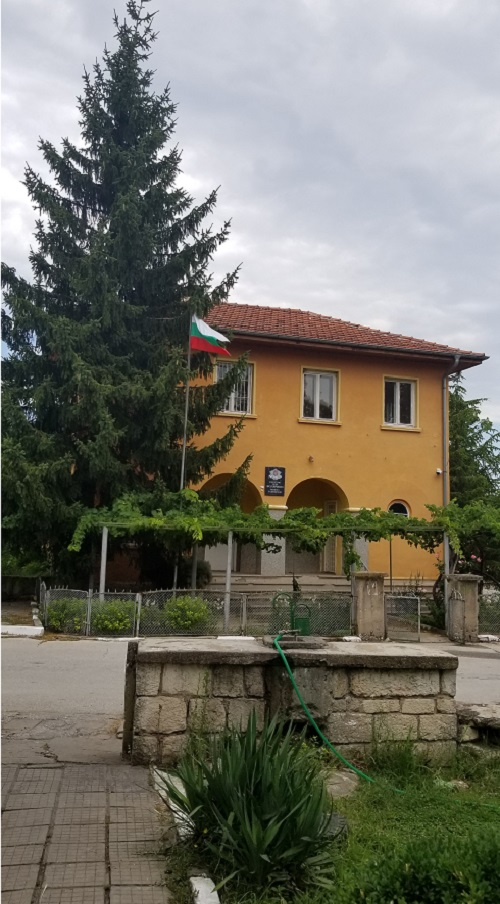
Village Hall, Bolyarino

Bolyarino is a village in Southern Bulgaria. It is located in Rakovski Municipality, Plovdiv Province.

== Geography ==
Bolyarino is located in Rakovski Municipality, Plovdiv Province on 35 km. east from Plovdiv. It lies between two elongated hills (height: 213 m). The soil in the northwest parts is sandy, as the rest is Chernozem. The elevation is 167 m.

== Natural and cultural monuments ==
The forest situated between Shishmantsi and Bolyarino is declared as protected territory, in order to preserve the location of very rare birds, such as little egret, squacco heron, black-crowned night heron, glossy ibis.

== Annual events ==
The village festival is on Dimitrovden – 26 October.
