= Northern Thrace =

Region of Thrace

Coordinates: 42.2500°N 26.0000°E

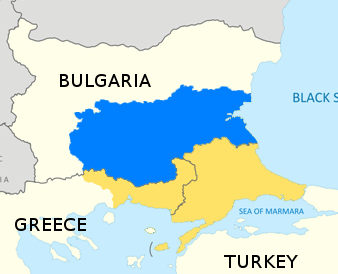
Northern Thrace is the part of Thrace within Bulgaria

Northern Thrace or North Thrace (Bulgarian: Северна Тракия, Severna Trakiya; Turkish: Kuzey Trakya; Greek: Βόρεια Θράκη), also called Bulgarian Thrace, constitutes the northern and largest part of the historical region of Thrace. It is located in Southern Bulgaria and includes the territory south of the Balkan Mountains and east of the Mesta River, bordering Western Thrace and East Thrace in the south, and the Black Sea in the east. It encompasses Sredna Gora, the Upper Thracian Plain, and 90% of the Rhodopes.

The climate ranges from subtropical to transitional continental and mountainous. The highest temperature recorded in Bulgaria occurred here: it was 45.2 °C (113.4 °F; 318.3 K) at Sadovo in 1916. The main rivers of the region are the Maritsa and its tributaries. Notable cities include Plovdiv, Burgas, Stara Zagora, Sliven, Haskovo, Yambol, Pazardzhik, Asenovgrad, Kardzhali, Dimitrovgrad, Kazanlak and Smolyan. Northern Thrace has an area of 42,073 km^{2}.

The Ottoman Empire created the autonomous province of the newly-named Eastern Rumelia in Northern Thrace in 1878. The region was annexed by the Principality of Bulgaria in 1885.

== Demographics ==
The ethnic composition of the population of Eastern Rumelia.

Ethnic group	census 1880		census 1884	
Ethnic group	Number	%	Number	%
Bulgarians	573,560	70.3%	681,734	70.0%
Turks	174,700	21.4%	200,489	20.6%
Greeks	42,456	5.2%	53,028	5.4%
Roma (Gypsies)	19,149	2.3%	27,190	2.8%
Jews	4,177	0.5%	6,982	0.7%
Armenians	1,306	0.1%	1,865	0.2%
Total	815,951		975,030	

The population's ethnic composition in the Bulgarian provinces of Burgas, Haskovo, Kardzhali, Pazardzhik, Plovdiv, Sliven, Smolyan, Stara Zagora and Yambol.

Ethnic group	census 2001		census 2011	
Ethnic group	Number	%	Number	%
Bulgarians	2,247,532	80.94%	1,856,647	72.91%
Turks	315,858	11.37%	258,757	10.16%
Roma (Gypsies)	155,954	5.62%	141,538	5.56%
Russians	5,185	0.19%	16,538	0.65%
Armenians	5,163	0.19%	16,538	0.65%
Greeks	1,432	0.05%	16,538	0.65%
Jews	253	0.01%	16,538	0.65%
Others	8,473	0.31%	16,538	0.65%
Undeclared	36,958	1.33%	273,151	10.73%
Total	2,776,808		2,546,631	

== See also ==
- Eastern Thrace
- Western Thrace
