= Tyurkmen, Plovdiv Province =

Tyurkmen
- Village
- Тюркмен
- Location within Bulgaria
- Coordinates: 42.283333°N 25.133333°E
- Country: Bulgaria
- Province: Plovdiv Province
- Municipality: Brezovo Municipality

Area
  - Land: 15.484 km^{2} (5.978 sq mi)

Population
  - Total: 240
  - Density: 15.5/km^{2} (40/sq mi)
- Postal code: 4157
- Area code: 03197

Tyurkmen (Bulgarian: Тюркмен) is a village in southern Bulgaria, Plovdiv Province, Brezovo Municipality. As of 15 June 2020, the population was 240, down from a high of over 1,200 and falling below 200 by 2024. The village is 196 meters above sea level.

== Infrastructure ==
There is a library but there is no school in the village. There are around 30 children in the village who travel on a daily basis to Brezovo to attend school. Due to the poor road conditions, the school bus often passed through the open fields, instead of the road. The transport is organized by the town hall. In 2018, villagers protested against dangerous road infrastructure between nearby villages.

There is a nearby dam with a large population of carps, crucians, and redfin fish. There is a wide variety of bird species.

== History ==
In 2014, an illegal marijuana farmhouse in the area was raided by police.

The village used to have the largest almond plantations in Bulgaria.

== Tourism ==
In a neighboring village, Granit, the oldest tree in Bulgaria can be found, the 1,668 year old Granit oak. The water springing in the area is also often referred to as the cleanest water in the country.

=== Holidays ===
The yearly festival of the village is on 20 October. On 1 February an honorary day of vineyards is held, when villagers plant vines and ritually pour red wine on them in hope of a better harvest.
