= Rozovets =

- Village
- Розовец
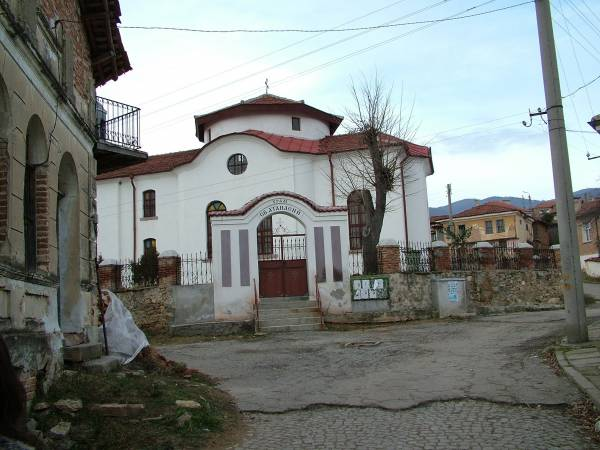
- The Church in Rozovec

- Location within Bulgaria
- Coordinates: 42.466667°N 25.116667°E
- Country: Bulgaria
- Province: Plovdiv Province
- Municipality: Brezovo Municipality
- Elevation: 520 m (1,710 ft)

Population
  - Total: 145
  - Density: 3.01/km^{2} (7.8/sq mi)
- Postal code: 4154
- Area code: 03195

Rozovets is a village in Southern Bulgaria, in Brezovo Municipality, Plovdiv Province. As of 15 June 2020, the village had a population of 145 inhabitants with a current address there.

== Geography ==
Rozovets is located 50 kilometers North East away from Plovdiv, in the South foot of the three highest peaks of Sarnena Sredna Gora geographical area. The East border of Rozovets is with Slavyani and Chehlare, and in the South it borders with the area of Zelenikovo. In the South West, it's neighboring village is Babek. Whereas in the South West – Svezhen.

The forests around the village have an area of 18,500 decares, while the village's total area encompasses 50,000 decares. The largest river in the area is river Rozovecka, which springs from right under peak Bratan.

The soils in the area are brown forest dark, transitional and light, and black soil-resin. There are not any active erosion processes in the area.

== History ==
The remains near the village, bearing the name "Kaleto" are most likely the remains of the famous from written sources Belyatovo fortress, in the Eastern Roman Empire, during XI-th century.

=== Protected territories ===
There are two protected territories of national heritage in the village's area, both of historical significance.

- Historical area "Dermenka" - located on the land of Rozovets village. A lobbyist location for partisans of the Chehlarska group.
- Historical place "Kutela" – located on the land of Rozovets village. An archeological monument.
