= Streltsi, Plovdiv Province =

Streltsi
- village
- Streltsi
- Location within Bulgaria
- Coordinates: 42.383333°N 24.916667°E
- Country: Bulgaria
- Province: Plovdiv
- Municipality: Brezovo Municipality

Population
  - Total: 389
  - Density: 125/km^{2} (320/sq mi)
- Postal code: 4152
- Area code: 031995

Streltsi is a village in southern Bulgaria. It's located in Brezovo Municipality, Plovdiv Province. Until the year 1934 the village bore the name Kadurshikli or Kadurshik. As of 2020, the village has a population of 389 people.

== Geography ==
The village is located 39 kilometers away from the center of Plovdiv and lies on an altitude of 250 meters above sea level. In 1969 a children's hospital for treatment of pulmonary diseases and asthma was founded. In 2006 the hospital was closed due to financial issues.

There is an oak tree with an age of over 400 years near the village, which was announced as a protected specimen in February 2009. The oak is located on the coast of Suho dere river. It is tall, around 25 meters and has a circumference of more than 4 meters.

There are large carps and crucian fish in the rivers near the village.

== Infrastructure ==
During 2019, in Streltsi village, the inhabitants complain that there is an issue with the drinking water. There have been complaints that mud was coming out of the tap along with the water, polluting it, rendering it undrinkable. The problem was resolved.

There are two working enterprises in the village, grocery stores and cafeterias. There is also a functioning school.

== Notable people ==
- Aleksander Todorov Koev - Province governor of Plovdiv (1922 - 1923).
- Ivan Hristov Valev - Bulgarian poet
- Georgi Michev - Bulgarian actor
- Petar Koev - deputy in the National Assembly of Bulgaria.
