= Padarsko =

- Village
- Padarsko
- Location within Bulgaria
- Coordinates: 42.35°N 24.9°E
- Country: Bulgaria
- Province: Plovdiv Province
- Municipality: Brezovo Municipality

Area
  - Total: 17,424 km^{2} (6,727 sq mi)

Population
  - Total: 576
  - Density: 331/km^{2} (860/sq mi)
- Postal code: 4158
- Area code: 031992

Padarsko is a village in Southern Bulgaria, Brezovo Municipality, Plovdiv Province. As of 15 June 2020, the current population of the village is 576 people. The former name of the village until 1934 used to be Kurudzhilare.

== Geography ==
Padarsko village is located 30 kilometers away from Plovdiv. The majority of the population in the village is elderly people. Most houses in the village are constructed out of handmade adobe bricks.

The soil in the area is very fertile and many sorts of vegetables and fruits are cultivated by local people in the area.

== Institutions and infrastructure ==
There is a secondary school "Otets Paisiy" in the village, which teaches kids from 1st to 12th grade in one shift. Moreover, the village has a Community Center "Hristo Botev" with a library. The "Hristo Botev" Community center was established in 1927 and is still functioning.

In early 2020, the villagers raised their complaints to the local Municipality due to polluted drinking water. In the tap water of the village, traces of natural Uranium could be found. The construction of a new aqueduct was finished in 2021, and the village's drinking water was restored to normal.
