= Zelenikovo, Plovdiv Province =

Zelenikovo
- Village
- Зелениково
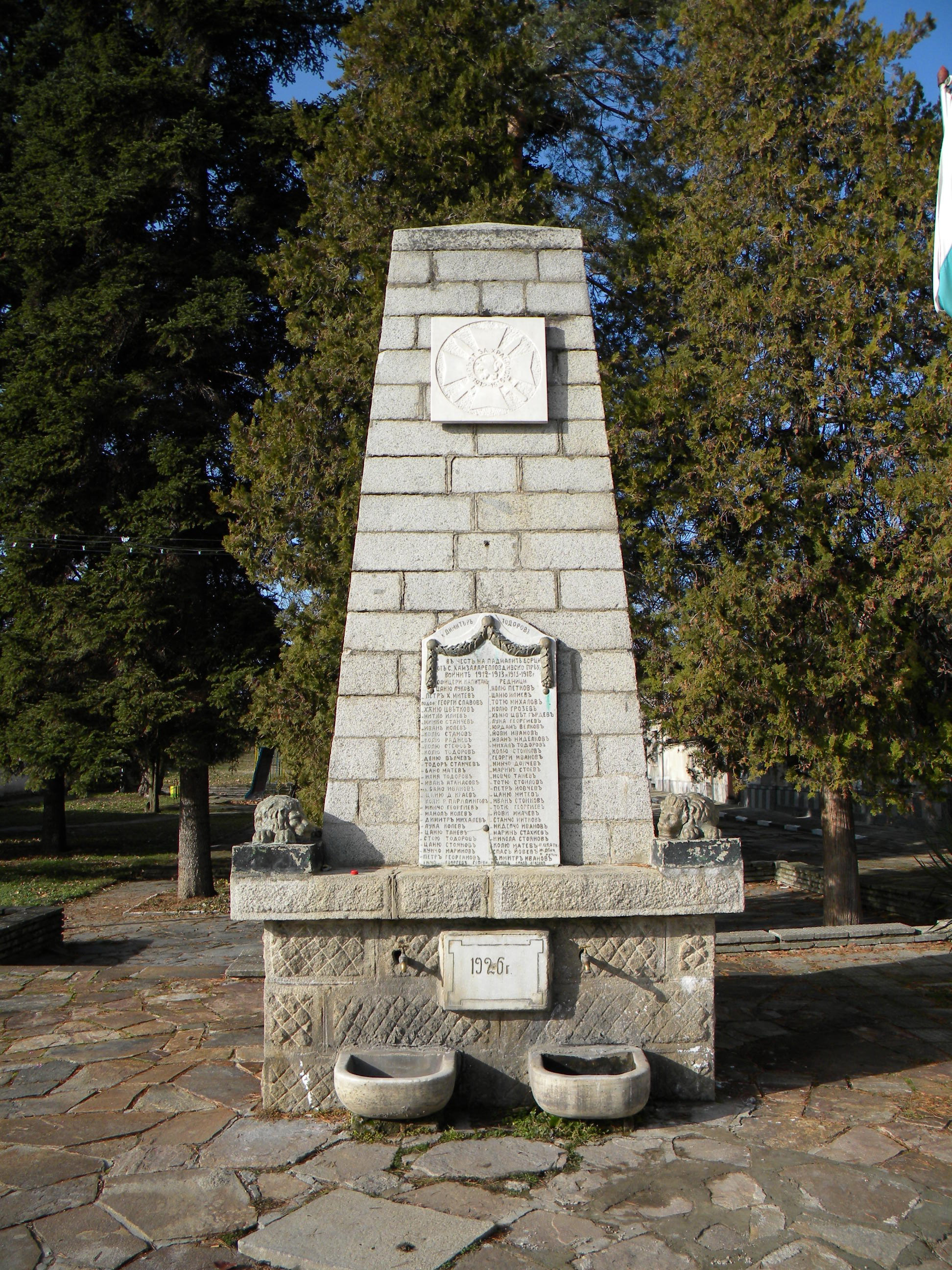
- The monument of the fallen warriors in Zelenikovo

- Location within Bulgaria
- Coordinates: 42.4°N 25.083333°E
- Country: Bulgaria
- Province: Plovdiv Province
- Municipality: Brezovo Municipality

Area
  - Total: 49.451 km^{2} (19.093 sq mi)
- Elevation: 318 m (1,043 ft)

Population
  - Total: 282
  - Density: 5.7/km^{2} (15/sq mi)
- Postal code: 4155
- Area code: 03194

Zelenikovo is a village in Southern Bulgaria, located in Brezovo Municipality, Plovdiv Province. As of June 2020, the village has a population count of 282 people total.

== Geography ==
Zelenikovo village is located in the southern hills of the most elevated part of the Sarnena Sredna Gora geographical area in Bulgaria. It combines a mountainous and flat terrain. The climate, and the geographical location of the village make it a suitable center for the development of oil rose cultivation and the rose oil processing industry to emerge and sustain itself. The oil rose processed in the area is of high quality and as of the last 50 years, there has been an increase in plantation numbers near the village.

The village offers good conditions for rural tourism. The reason for that is the presence of dams, rivers, mountains and hills nearby. The municipality's leadership has announced that the development of the tourism will be a focus in their future years.

Conditions are being created to demonstrate to tourists how the distillation of rose oil happens in a traditional and interesting manner.

=== Infrastructure ===
The infrastructure of the village is intact. There is a public home edifice, for educating children deprived of parental care. The orphanage is located at the end of the village.

In the village, a large monument of those killed in the wars of national unification can also be found.

== History ==
According to documents left by the local teacher Todor Georgiev Gogovpisani around 1944, it is assumed that the Zelenikovo Village was created more than 700 years ago by Tsar Ivan Shishman, while relocating a large portion of the population to establish a better border control beyond the Balkan Mountains to strengthen the military positions of Bulgarian defenders.

During Ottoman rule, the name of the village used to be Hamzalare, named after the Ottoman leader who governed the village.

=== Notable people ===
- Ivan Krumov – A parachutist record holder.
- Petar Dimitrov – One of the first graduates of the village, principal of the school in Brezovo for over 20 years.
- Tsanyo Aksiyski – Former director of "Prosveta" publishing house in Plovdiv.
