= Chehlare =

- Village
- Chehlare
- Location within Bulgaria
- Coordinates: 42.416667°N 25.166667°E
- Country: Bulgaria
- Province: Plovdiv Province
- Municipality: Brezovo Municipality

Area
  - Land: 21,521 km^{2} (8,309 sq mi)
- Area code: 03198

Chehlare, with a former name of Morozovo (09.04.1950 - 23.09.1969), is a village located in southern Bulgaria, Plovdiv Province,Brezovo Municipality. The permanent population of the village is 58, and the villagers with a current address Chehlare are counted to be 110.

== Geography ==
Chehlare was first established as a settlement by Bulgarians fleeing from Ottoman soldiers during the Ottoman rule in Bulgaria. The initial name of the village was Morozovo. The village's agriculture is focused around the cultivation of roses. The rose oil played a major part in the village's economical well being even during Ottoman rule. The climate and soil conditions are favorable for the cultivation of roses.

== History ==
In 1853 the villagers write a plead to the Ottoman rule to ask for a church. They collect coin from all parts of Bulgaria and eventually succeed to raise a temple. Nowadays, the temple is in ruin.

Villagers from Chehlare have participated in the Russo-Ottoman wars and have been taking active parts in VMORO. Men from the village have actively participated in World War I, the Balkan Wars, giving a total of 67 casualties.

During Ottoman rule, Chehlare, formerly Morozovo had a total of 235 houses and roughly 1000 inhabitants. After Bulgaria's liberation, it becomes a central part in the partisan movement in the Eastern Sredna Gora region in Bulgaria. The name Morozovo comes from a partisan commander who was born in the village - Srebro Babakov (Morozov).

The festival of the village is held each year on 9th of September.

== Notable people ==
- Decho Butev (1911 - 1943), Bulgarian partisan.
- Srebro Babakov (1908 - 1950) Bulgarian partisan.
- Prof. D-r Yono Mitev, historian.
- Slavi Chakurov (1915 - 1998), one of the first partisans in Bulgaria.
