= Sarnegor =

- Village
- Сърнегор
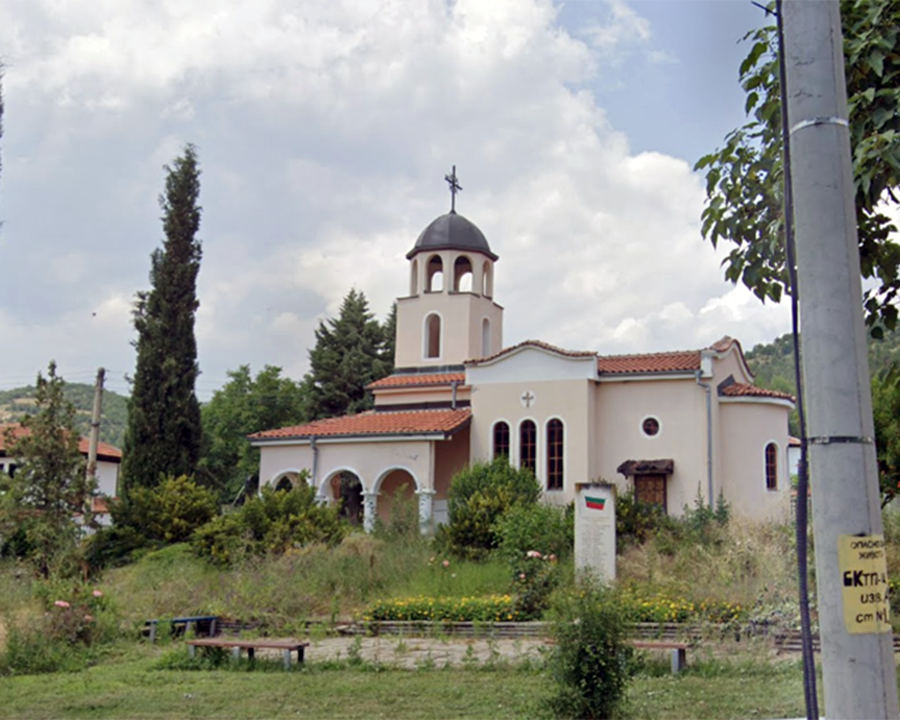

- Location within Bulgaria
- Coordinates: 42.45°N 24.9333333°E
- Country: Bulgaria
- Province: Plovdiv Province
- Municipality: Brezovo Municipality

Area
  - Total: 16.801 km^{2} (6.487 sq mi)

Population
  - Total: 78
  - Density: 4.64/km^{2} (12.0/sq mi)
- Postal code: 4146
- Area code: 031993

Sarnegor (Bulgarian: Сърнегор) is a village in southern Bulgaria, located in Brezovo Municipality, Plovdiv Province. As of 15 June 2020, the village has a population of 78 people with a current address registered there.

== Geography ==
Sarnegor village is located at the foothills of the Sredna Gora mountain range, at an altitude of 430 meters above sea level.

== History and Culture ==
During World War II, on 26 June 1944 a US bombardier aircraft B-17 crashed with sergeant Harold James piloting it. Chased by the authorities, the pilot was captured near Sarnegor and brought in the village for trial. Bulgarian partisans attacked the village and took the pilot. James spends time with his saviors before returning to the United States.

In 2013, the population raised their concern due to the lack of a postal office, police officers or public transport in the area. The public transport of the village has declared bankruptcy. Moreover, there wasn't an active medical practitioner in the village at the time and it was serviced by travelling doctors.

=== Culture ===
The majority of the population in the village define themselves as Orthodox Christians. In the village there are three landmarks.

- The "Sv. Dimitar" Orthodox church
- Monument of the fallen during the wars for national liberation from the Ottoman Empire.
- Monument of the American pilot Harold James.
- Community hall "Dimitar Blagoev" - established 1910.

=== Notable people ===
- Dinko Dermendzhiev
- Aleksander Zhibarov - Bulgarian painter.
- Rayko Stoyanov
- Zhelyazka Bochukova - Folklore Singer
