= Zlatosel =

- Village
- Златосел
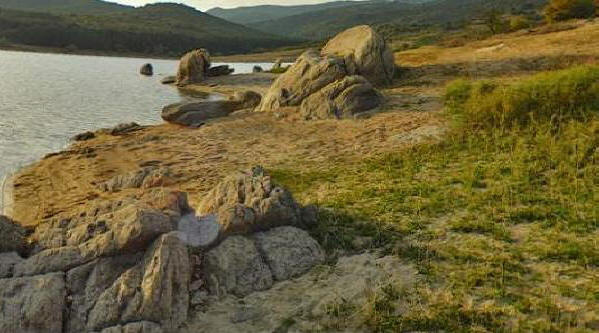
- The villa area near the Village and the Dondukovo Dam

- Location within Bulgaria
- Coordinates: 42.416667°N 25.016667°E
- Country: Bulgaria
- Province: Plovdiv Province
- Municipality: Brezovo Municipality

Area
  - Land: 20.052 km^{2} (7.742 sq mi)
- Elevation: 306 m (1,004 ft)

Population
  - Total: 88
  - Density: 4.39/km^{2} (11.4/sq mi)
- Postal code: 4162
- Area code: 031997

Zlatosel (Bulgarian: Златосел) is a village in southern Bulgaria, located in Brezovo Municipality, Plovdiv Province. The population of the village as of June 2020 is 88 people.

== Geography ==
The village is located in a semi-mountainous area, on the southern slopes of Sarnena Sredna Gora mountain range. The surrounding hills are famous for being a good place for the cultivation of oil roses. There is a river that passes through the village it's called the Zlatoselska river, and is called after the name of the village.

In the upper part of the village, and later through its course it feeds the Dondukovo Dam, and flows into the Maritsa river. the river runs steep and springs from the ridges of Sarnena Sredna Gora, north of the village. During the summer, the water in the river is low.

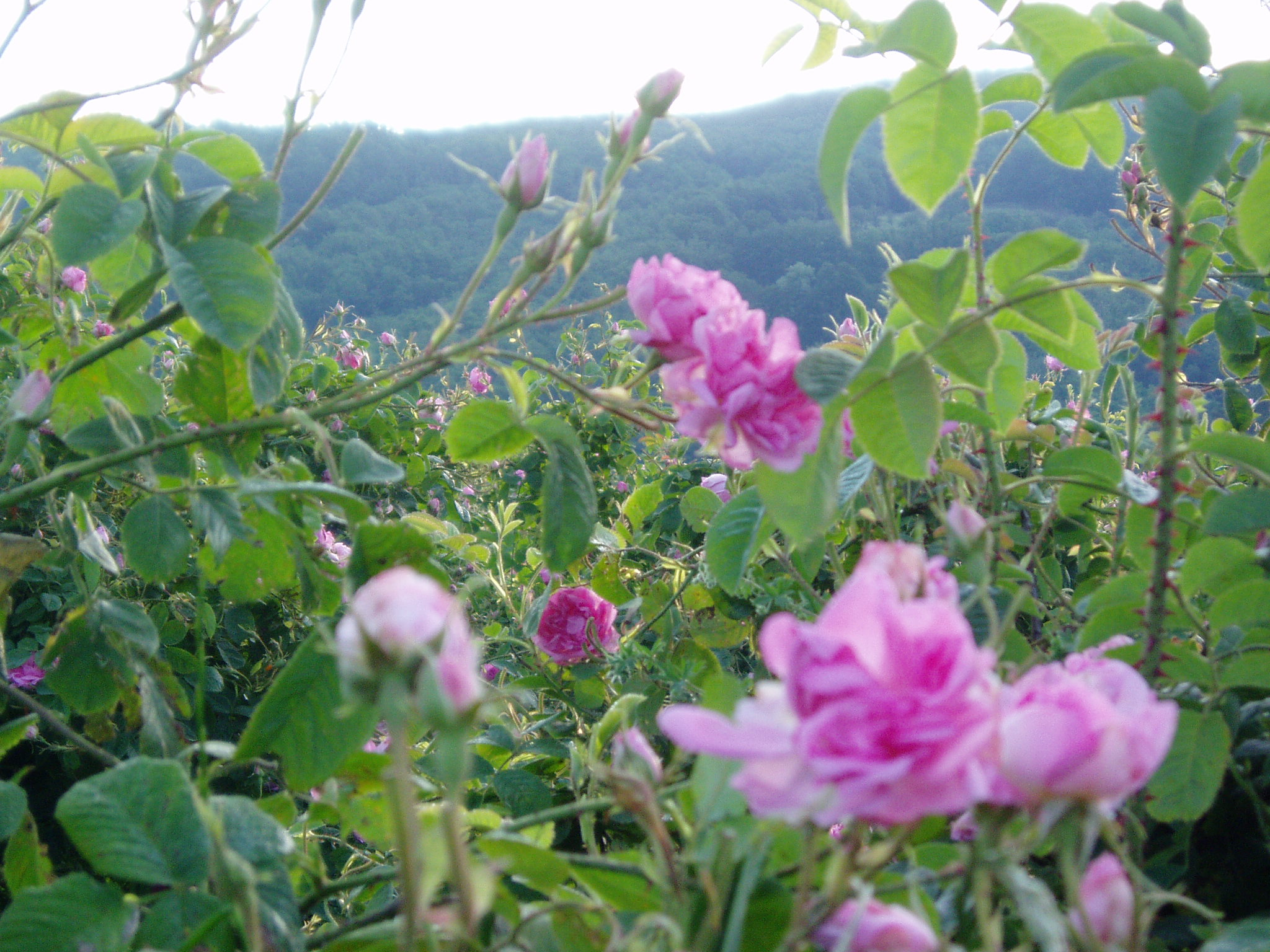
The oil roses in the area near Zlatosel Village

== Sightseeing ==
=== Plochata Megalith Structure ===
Near the village Zlatosel, there is a site called "Plochata" - a peak in the Balkan Mountains. The height of the stone is more than 2.5 meters, and it has a width of over 3 meters. The dolmen structure is one of the largest megalith structures found in Bulgaria. According to the scientists who worked on the project of dating, the stone structure dates far back to the 2nd century BC. The supposed idea behind the structure is a tomb for a royal family of Thracian origin or a local aristocratic blood line.

On one of the hills near the village, there is also a Thracian sanctuary elevated, which praises the Thracian Sun God.

=== Villa area near Dondukovo dam ===
The villa area is located near the Dondukovo dam where tourists often visit to rest near the water. The conditions for fishing and rest during the summer are good near the dam.
