= Svezhen =

- Svezhen
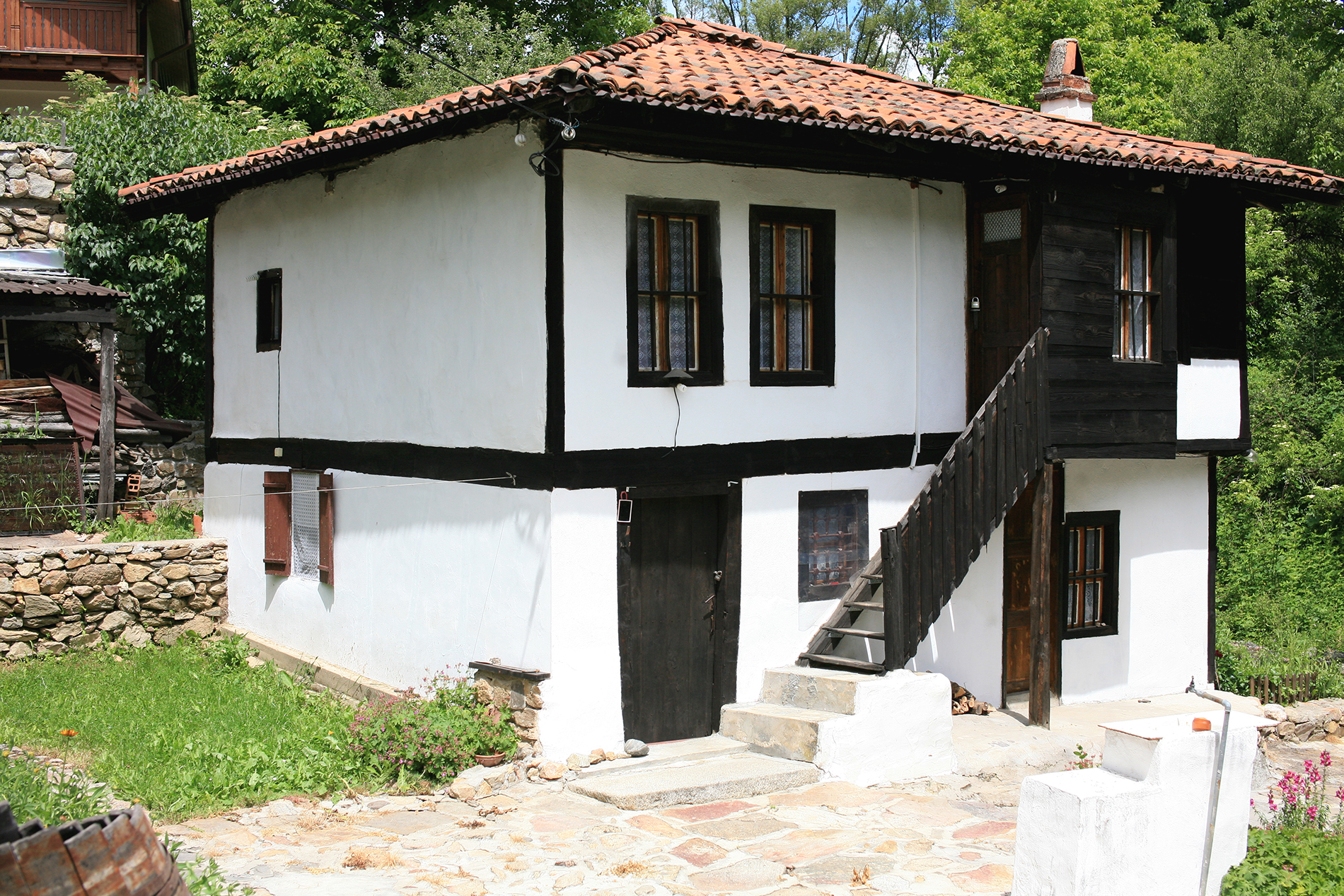
- Traditional Bulgarian house in Svezhen

- Location within Bulgaria
- Coordinates: 42.5°N 25.016667°E
- Country: Bulgaria
- Municipality: Brezovo
- Province: Plovdiv

Government
- Time zone: UTC+2 (EET)
  - Summer (DST): UTC+3 (EEST)
- Postal code: 4304

Svezhen (Bulgarian: Свежен) is a village located in southern Bulgaria, in municipality of Brezovo, Plovdiv Province. It is located in the Sredna Gora mountain range. Svezhen is 32 kilometers away from Karlovo and 68 km away from Plovdiv. The latest data for 2020 shows a population of 208 people.

== Geography ==
Svezhen village is located at an altitude of 720 meters and covers an area of roughly 60 km^{2}. The village is situated higher than the neighboring villages, thus the climate is colder during the winter and the summer is not as warm. The winter is snowy and lasts from early November until April. The spring season is short and cold and the summer is short. Rainfall increases during autumn months. Almost all wind currents that pass through Bulgaria also pass through Svezhen. The local people call the north east wind "The Upper wind" and the Northwest wind "The bottom wind" since both of them travel across the local Svezhanska river in the upper and the lower part.

== History ==
Svezhen played a major role in the preparation of many Bulgarians to take participation in the Russo-Turkish war of 1877-1878 for the liberty of Bulgaria. One of the main reasons for that was its strategic situation, being surrounded by multiple hills. In 1987 the 600-year village was announced a historical archeological site. The exact year remains unknown.

=== Places of interest ===
- The grave of Hadzhi Dimitar, one of the most prominent Bulgarian voivodes.
- A memorial of the fallen warriors in the Russo-Turkish war.
- House museum of colonel Vladimir Serafimov.
- Church "Saints Peter and Pavel"
