= Rakovski (town) =

Rakovski Раковски
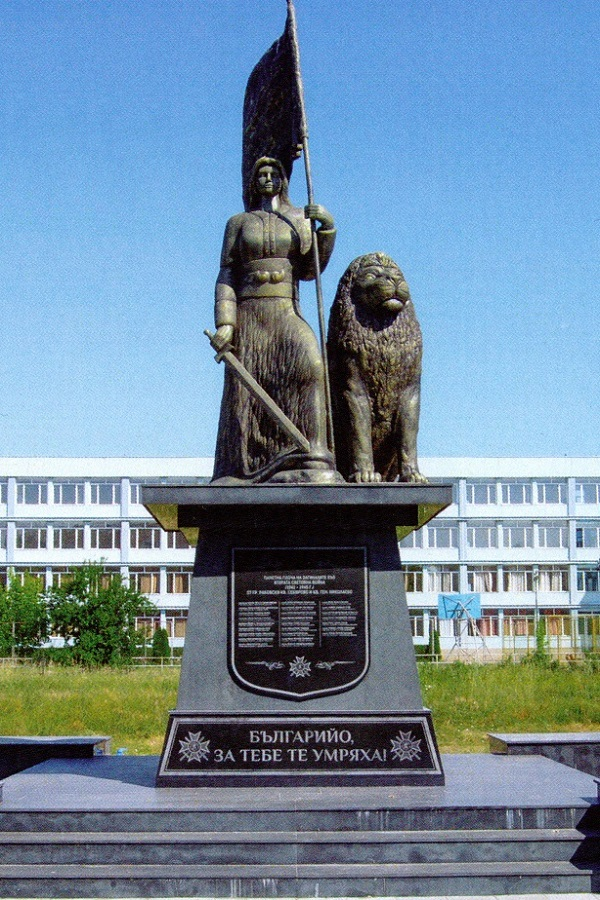
- Military monument

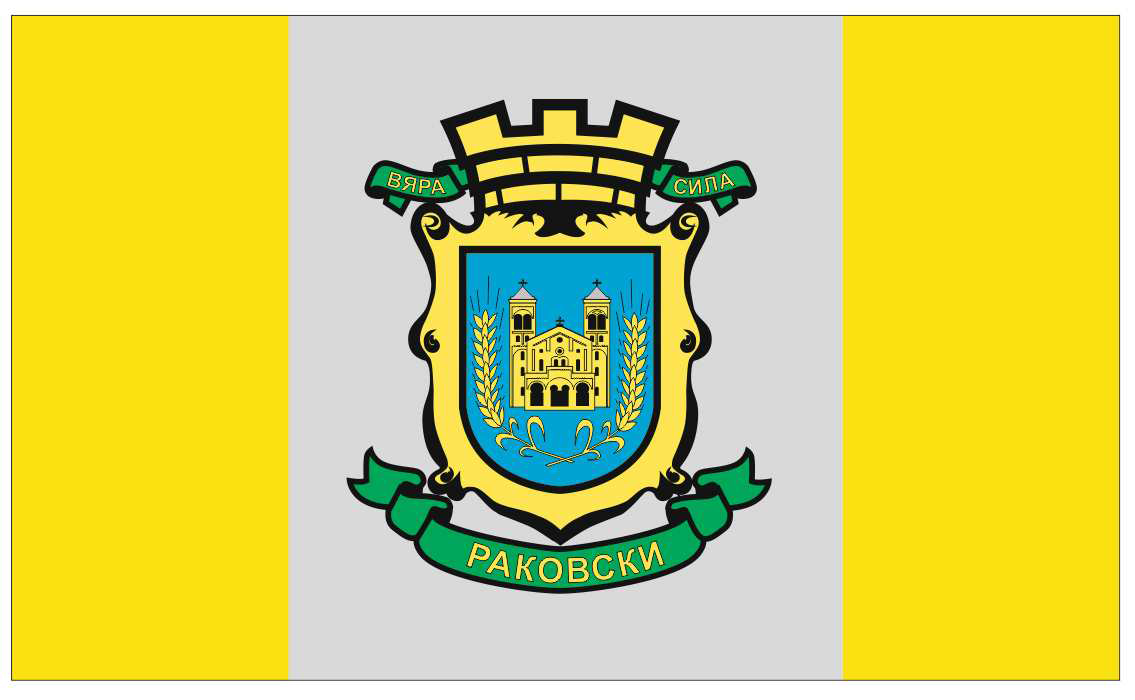
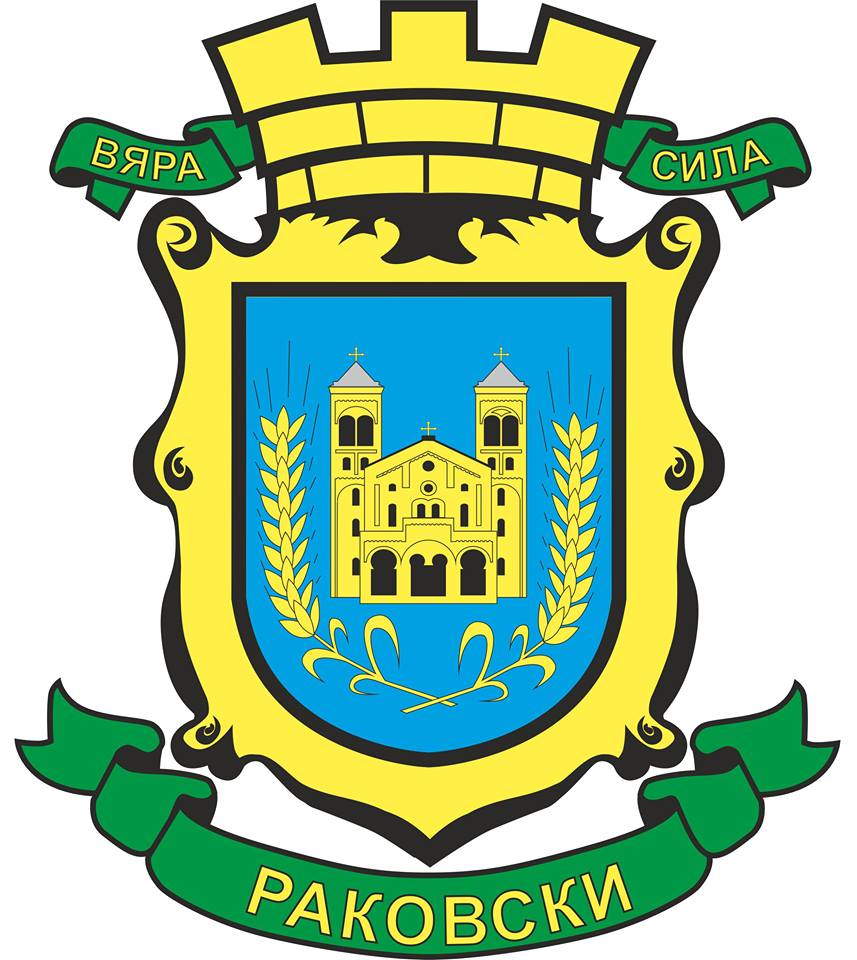
- Flag Coat of arms

- Location of Rakovski
- Coordinates: 42°18′N 24°58′E
- Country: Bulgaria
- Province (Oblast): Plovdiv

Government
  - Mayor: Pavel Gugzherov
- Elevation: 180 m (590 ft)

Population (Census 2021)
  - City: 14,679
  - Urban: 25,326
- Time zone: UTC+2 (EET)
  - Summer (DST): UTC+3 (EEST)
- Postal Code: 4150
- Area code: 03151

Rakovski (Bulgarian: Раковски [rɐˈkɔfski]) is a town in southern Bulgaria, in the historical region of Thrace. It is located in the Plovdiv Province. The town is also the centre of the Rakovski Municipality. Rakovski was founded in 1966 with the merging of three villages — General Nikolaevo, Sekirovo, and Parchevich. The new town was named after the prominent Bulgarian revolutionary Georgi Sava Rakovski.

== Geography and Climate ==
The town is located in the western part of the Upper Thracian Lowland, at 25 km to the northeast of Bulgaria's second largest city Plovdiv, and has an area of 5,50 km^{2}. Rakovski is located in a transitional continental climatic zone south of Stara Planina. The summers are hot and dry and the winters are mild, with snow remaining for about a month.

== History ==
Traces of human population in the area date back since the Chalcolithic. There are remains of an ancient settlement and a Roman road at 2 km to the southeast of the town.

The area was settled by Paulicians in the Middle Ages, who served as frontier guards and heavily armed infantry in the battles between the Byzantine Empire and Bulgaria between the 9th and the 14th century. Most of them fled to Nikopol on the Danube, the Second Bulgarian Empire's last stronghold, after fierce fights with the Ottomans in the end of the 14th century. There they accepted Roman Catholicism from Chiprovtsi missionaries and gradually returned to their native places. The different confession did not, however, affect the local residents' patriotic feelings, as many took part in the Bulgarian National Revival.

Information about the three villages (now neighborhoods) that formed the town of Rakovski in 1966 can be found in several Ottoman tax registers. General Nikolaevo is mentioned as Kalıçla sarı and Sarı Kalıçla in 1488 and 1576, Sekirovo is denoted as Baltacilar in 1576 and Parchevich is counted under the name Ali Fakıh.

== Religion ==
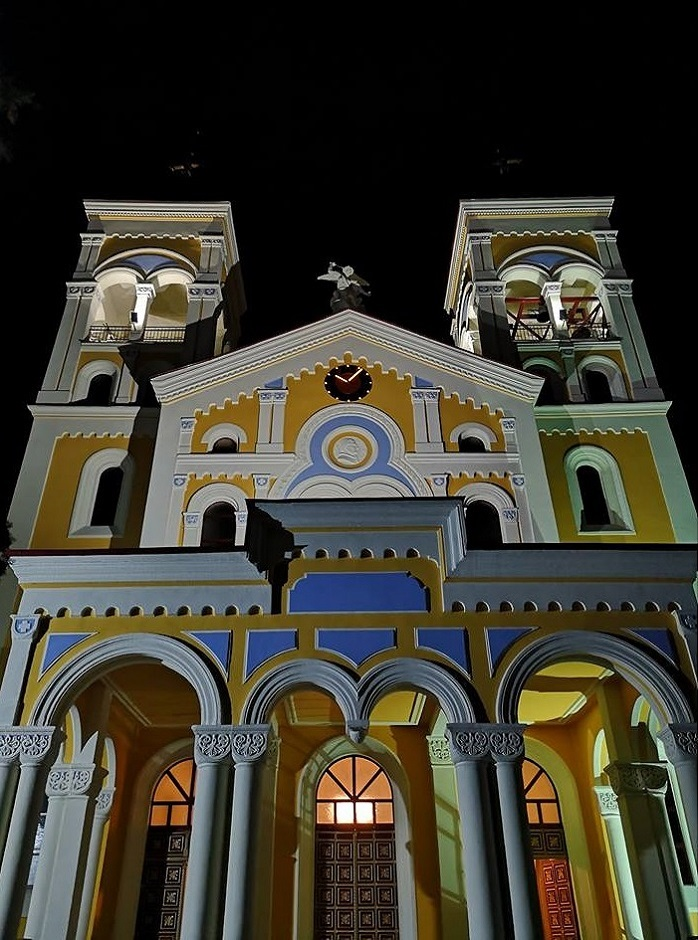
St. Archangel Michael Catholic Church in Rakovski

Rakovski is by far the largest predominantly Roman Catholic town in Bulgaria, with the vast majority of the population professing Roman Catholicism. There are Roman Catholic churches in all three neighborhoods, those in General Nikolaevo (built 1929) and Sekirovo serving as parish churches and being known as two of the largest Roman Catholic places of worship in this largely Eastern Orthodox part of the Balkans. Rakovski is part of the Roman Catholic Diocese of Sofia and Plovdiv.

A nunnery and a monastery are located in the town, the former being a Franciscan one dedicated to the Sacred Heart and the latter to Polish martyr Maximilian Kolbe.

The Catholic Church of the 'Sacred Heart' in Rakovski is the largest in the Balkans. It was built in 1928 after the Chirpan earthquake that left it in ruins.

== Culture ==
There are eight chitalishta in the Rakovski Municipality and two of them are in the town of Rakovski — chitalishte Saints Cyril and Methodius and Prosveta.

In 2003 the chitalishte Saint Cyril and Methodius was approved for receiving money for the project Chitalishta. With the help of this project an educational centre for disabled people was created in it. The chitalishte participates in a project of exchanging of library experience, financed by the American department. In 2006 it became a participant in a project of the Bulgarian Academy of Sciences and the University of Bologna named - Tourism School which is a part of the grand Cultural tourism and intercultural environment project. The chitalishte is a co-organiser in the preparation and organization of the festival Kukove.

=== Traditions ===
Rakovski hosts the annual international festival called Kukove. The performers wear masks and dress as Kukeri. The festival is the biggest cultural event of this kind in the region. The participants are not only from Bulgaria but also from Greece, Serbia, Ireland, Romania and North Macedonia.

The annual holiday of the wine - Vinaria-Trifon Zarezan is a tradition for the Rakovski Municipality. Another festival is held in the village of Belozem. It is called The festival of the White Stork and takes place annually in the beginning of May. In 2005 Belozem was named A European village of the white stork by the Foundation of the European Natural Heritage.

The Municipality of Rakovski is also a member of the Foundation of the European Carnival Cities — FECC.

=== Books ===
- A Little Encyclopedia of Rakovski, compiled by Ivan Plachkov. 2nd bilingual ed. Rakovski: Veda Green Printing House, 2026. 442 pages. ISBN 978-619-04-0668-6.

== Sport ==
For the first time in 2002 the town of Rakovski hosted The International Football Tournament for Children - United by Football. The organizers of this event were the Municipality of Rakovski, The Professional Football League, the Eparchy of Sacred Heart, the Eparchy of Saint Archangel Mihail, and the monastery Saint Maximilian Kolbe. The teams of many European countries have participated in this tournament so far, for example Poland, Croatia, Italy (AC Milan), Spain, England, Malta, Germany, Romania, Turkey (Beşiktaş, Fenerbahçe). The Bulgarian teams of Levski, Litex, Lokomotiv Plovdiv, Botev Plovdiv, Naftex Burgas and others have also participated. The local football club Rakovski has played in republican championships for children and youths in 2002 in Italy and Germany, in 2003 in Italy and Malta, in 2004, 2006, 2007 in Italy. The club has also been a host for teams from Germany and Japan. There are four other amateur football clubs in the Municipality that play in the tournaments of Plovdiv Province.

== Economy ==
Industry is of a significant importance for the economy of Rakovski Municipality. The main industries include chemicals production, textiles, and food and beverage processing.

=== Agriculture ===
Rakovski Municipality has traditions of developed and highly productive agriculture. The mild climate and the fertile soil are the main reasons for growing wheat, sunflower, maize, different vegetables, and fruits. There is a game-breeding enterprise near the village of Stryama called Chekeritsa. It has several bird species, deer, and hares. The enterprise has favorable conditions for ecotourism and photo-hunting.

=== Rakovski Industrial Zone ===
The Rakovski Industrial Zone was the first of its kind in Bulgaria. In operation since July 2004, the zone attracts investors with competitive incentives for doing business and opportunities for immediate start of production. The land that is given to the investors is with a changed statute and is licensed and ready for industrial construction.

The industrial zone is located in the land of Stryama village and spans 815 decares (81.5 hectares). The zone is situated 14 km from the center of the province, the city of Plovdiv, and only 8 km from the Trakiya motorway.

The first investor was British company William Hughes Ltd., manufacturing springs for the automotive industry. By the beginning of 2006, 14 additional companies had set up operations in the zone, including German hypermarket chain operator Kaufland and building components manufacturer Prefabbricati Cividini S.p.A. of Italy.

== International relations ==
=== Twin towns — Sister cities ===
Rakovski is twinned with:

- Strumica, North Macedonia (2009)
- Kiseljak, Bosnia and Herzegovina (2022)
