= Upper Thracian Plain =

Lowland area in southern Bulgaria

Coordinates: 42°15′N 26°0′E

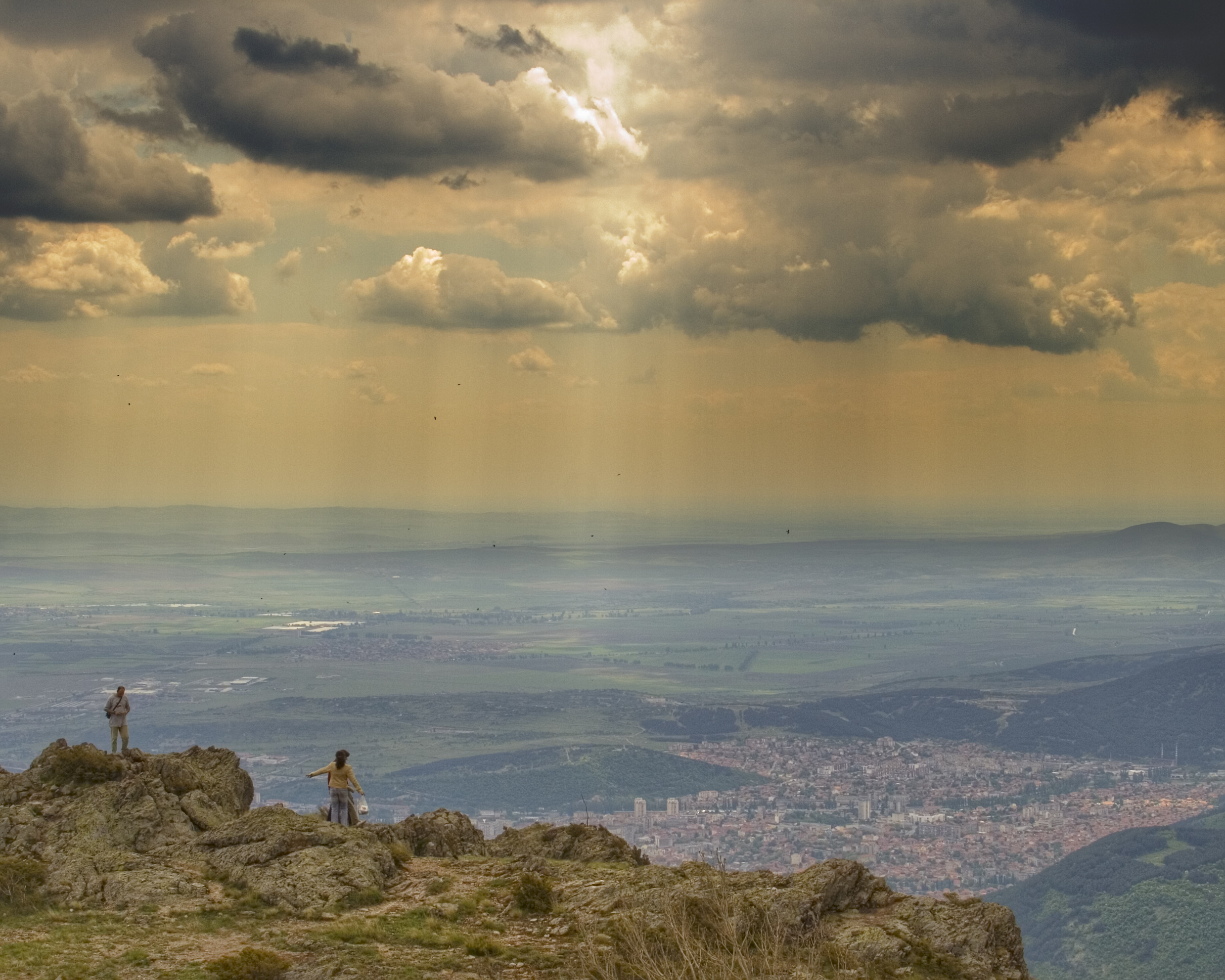
View of the city of Sliven and the eastern Upper Thracian Plain from southern Stara Planina

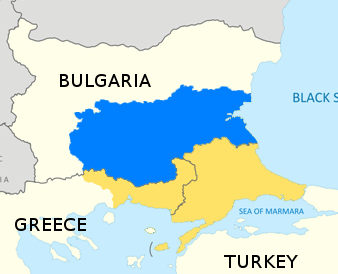
Northern Thrace (Blue), the location of the Upper Thrace Plain, is the part of Thrace within Bulgaria

The Upper Thracian Plain (Bulgarian: Горнотракийска низина, Gornotrakiyska nizina) constitutes the northern part of the historical region of Thrace. It is located in southern Bulgaria, between Sredna Gora mountains to the north and west, a secondary mountain chain parallel to the main Balkan Mountains; the Rhodopes, Sakar and Strandzha to the south; and the Black Sea to the east. A fertile agricultural region, the Upper Thracian Plain proper has an area of 16,032 square kilometres (6,190 sq mi) and an average elevation of 168 metres (551 ft). The plain is part of Northern Thrace. The climate is transitional continental. The highest temperature recorded in Bulgaria occurred here: it was 45.2 °C (113.4 °F) at Sadovo in 1916. The precipitation is 550 millimetres (22 in) a year. Important rivers are the Maritsa and its tributaries, Arda, Tundzha, Stryama, Topolnitsa, and Vacha. Important cities include Plovdiv, Burgas, Stara Zagora, Pazardzhik, Asenovgrad, Haskovo, Yambol and Sliven.
