= Plovdiv Province =

Province in southern Bulgaria

Coordinates: 42°10′N 24°45′E

Plovdiv Province Област Пловдив
- Province
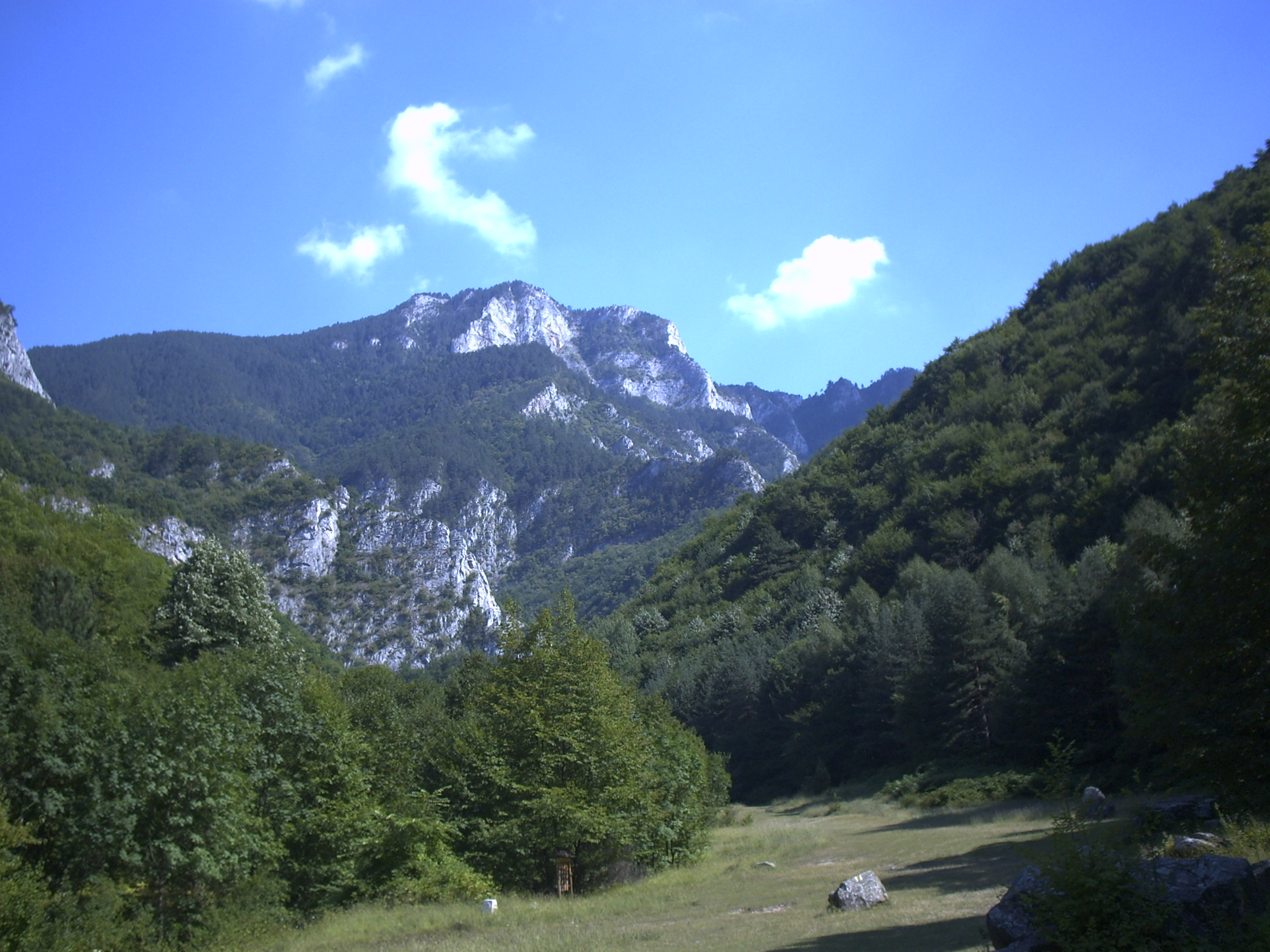
- Red Wall Reserve

- Flag

- Location of Plovdiv Province in Bulgaria
- Country: Bulgaria
- Capital: Plovdiv
- Municipalities: 18

Government
  - Governor: Iliya Zyumbilev

Area
  - Total: 5,972.9 km^{2} (2,306.1 sq mi)

Population (31st December 2024)
  - Total: 635,630
  - Density: 106.42/km^{2} (275.62/sq mi)
- Time zone: UTC+2 (EET)
  - Summer (DST): UTC+3 (EEST)
- License plate: PB
- Website: pd.government.bg

Plovdiv Province (Bulgarian: Област Пловдив: Oblast Plovdiv, former name Plovdiv okrug) is a province in central southern Bulgaria. It comprises 18 municipalities (общини, obshtini, sing. общинa, obshtina) on a territory of 5,972.9 km^{2} (2,306.1 sq mi) with a population, as of February 2011, of 683,027 inhabitants. The province is named after its administrative and industrial centre — the city of Plovdiv.

== Geography ==
Plovdiv Province includes parts of the Upper Thracian Plain, the Rhodopes, Sredna Gora, the Sub-Balkan valleys and Stara Planina, including its highest peak, Botev (2,376 m). The main rivers in the province are Maritsa, Vacha, Stryama, Pyasachnik. There are numerous reservoirs, the most important of which are Pyasachnik and Krichim. Mineral springs are abundant; there are several major spa resorts — Hisarya, Narechen, Banya, and minor spas at Klisura, Asenovgrad, Kuklen, Rosino, Krasnovo, Stoletovo, and others. There are many natural landmarks, especially in the Central Balkan National Park, including the spectacular waterfall Raysko Praskalo, the highest in the Balkans.

== Municipalities ==
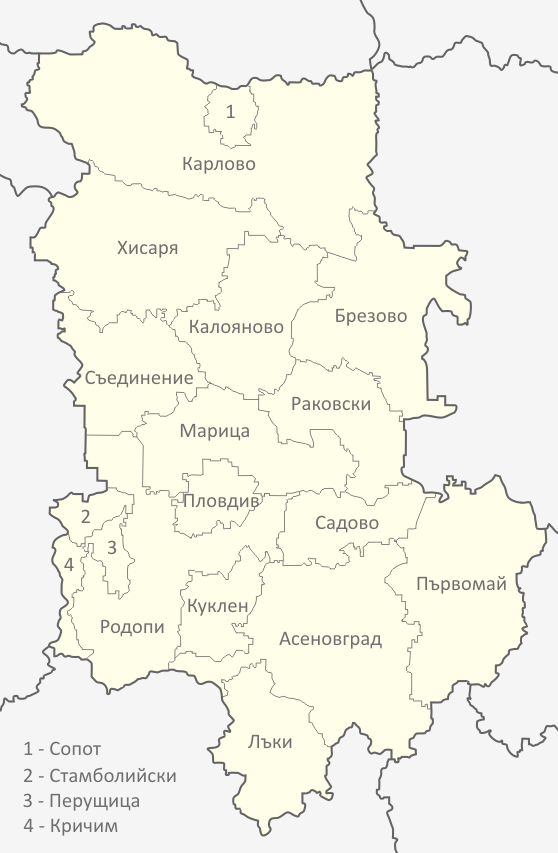
Municipalities of Plovdiv province

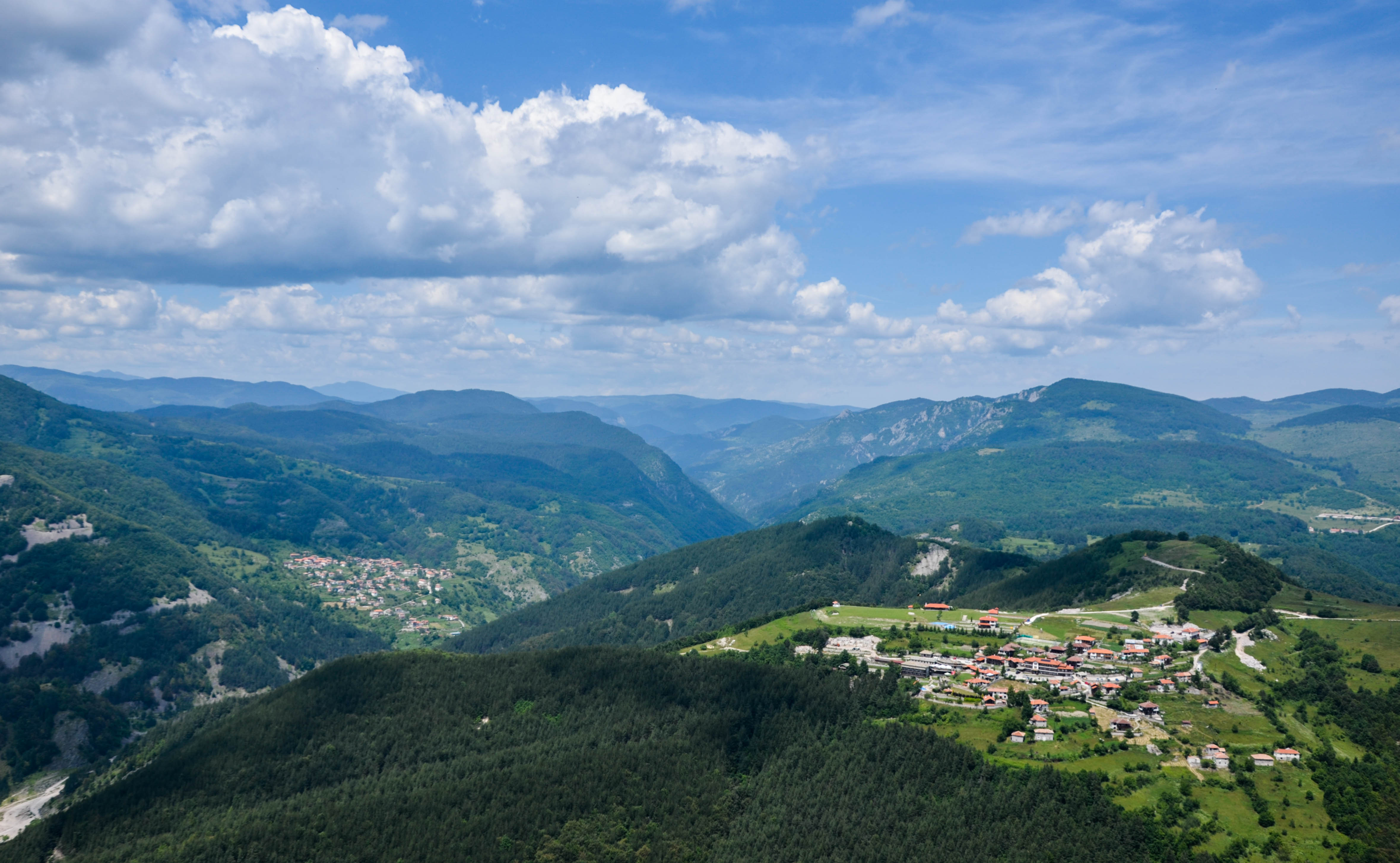
View of the Rhodopes from Belintash in the south of the province

Plovdiv Province (Област, oblast) contains 18 municipalities (singular: община, obshtina, plural: Общини, obshtini). The following table shows the names of each municipality in English and Cyrillic, the main town or village (towns are shown in bold), and the population of each as of 31st December 2024.

Municipality	Cyrillic	Pop.	Town/Village	Pop.
Asenovgrad	Асеновград	56,859	**Asenovgrad**	45,362
Brezovo	Брезово	5,877	**Brezovo**	1,527
Hisarya	Хисаря	9,952	**Hisarya**	5,888
Kaloyanovo	Калояново	10,231	Kaloyanovo	2,186
Karlovo	Карлово	44,894	**Karlovo**	18,803
Krichim	Кричим	7,128	**Krichim**	7,128
Kuklen	Куклен	6,134	**Kuklen**	5,559
Laki	Лъки	2,043	**Laki**	1,502
Maritsa (Plovdiv rural)	Марица	31,191	**Plovdiv**	see below
Perushtitsa	Перущица	4,148	**Perushtitsa**	4,148
Plovdiv (city)	Пловдив	329,489	**Plovdiv**	329,489
Parvomay	Първомай	20,757	**Parvomay**	10,973
Rakovski	Раковски	25,389	**Rakovski**	14,718
Rodopi (Plovdiv rural)	Родопи	32,359	**Plovdiv**	see above
Sadovo	Садово	14,528	**Sadovo**	2,339
Sopot	Сопот	8,139	**Sopot**	7,238
Stamboliyski	Стамболийски	17,654	**Stamboliyski**	9,723
Saedinenie	Съединение	8,858	**Saedinenie**	4,917

== Towns ==
The province's capital is the city of Plovdiv; other towns include Karlovo, Sopot, Klisura, Kalofer, Hisarya, Saedinenie, Rakovski, Brezovo, Stamboliyski, Krichim, Perushtitsa, Sadovo, Parvomay, Asenovgrad and Laki.

== Demographics ==
Historical population
Year	Pop.	±%
1946	515,887	—
1956	564,910	+9.5%
1965	647,653	+14.6%
1975	725,452	+12.0%
1985	760,076	+4.8%
1992	739,694	−2.7%
2001	715,816	−3.2%
2011	683,027	−4.6%
2021	634,497	−7.1%
Source: pop-stat.mashke.org

Plovdiv Province had a population of 715,904 (715,816 also given) according to a 2001 census, of which 48.4% were male and 51.6% were female.

As of the end of 2009, the population, announced by the Bulgarian National Statistical Institute, numbered 701,684 of which 24.1% are over 60 years of age.

=== Ethnic groups ===
Ethnic groups in Plovdiv Province (2011 census)
Ethnic group	Percentage
Bulgarians	87.1%
Turks	6.5%
Romani	4.9%
others and indefinable	1.5%

Total population (2011 census): 683 027
Ethnic groups (2011 census): Identified themselves: 620 373 persons:

- Bulgarians: 540 303 (87,09%)
- Turks: 40 255 (6,49%)
- Romani: 30 202 (4,87%)
- Others and indefinable: 9 613 (1,54%)

A further 60,000 persons in Plovdiv Province did not declare their ethnic group at the 2011 census.

Ethnic groups according to the 2001 census, when 715 816 people of the population of 715,904 of Plovdiv Province identified themselves (with percentage of total population):

- Bulgarians: 621 338 (86.8%)
- Turks: 52 499 (7.3%)
- Romani: 30 196 (4.2%)
- Armenians: 3 140 (0.4%)
- Russians: 1 151 (0.2%)
- Greeks: 766 (0.1%)

=== Religion ===
Religions in Plovdiv Province (2011 census)
Religious group	Percentage
Orthodox Christian	62.67%
Muslim	5.3%
Roman Catholic Christian	2.85%
Protestant Christian	0.9%
others and indefinable	28.23%

Religious adherence in the province according to 2001 census:

Census 2001
religious adherence	population	%
Orthodox Christians	608,226	84.97%
Muslims	62,595	8.74%
Roman Catholics	23,122	3.23%
Protestants	3,913	0.55%
Other	4,412	0.62%
Religion not mentioned	13,548	1.89%
total	715,816	100%

== Economy ==
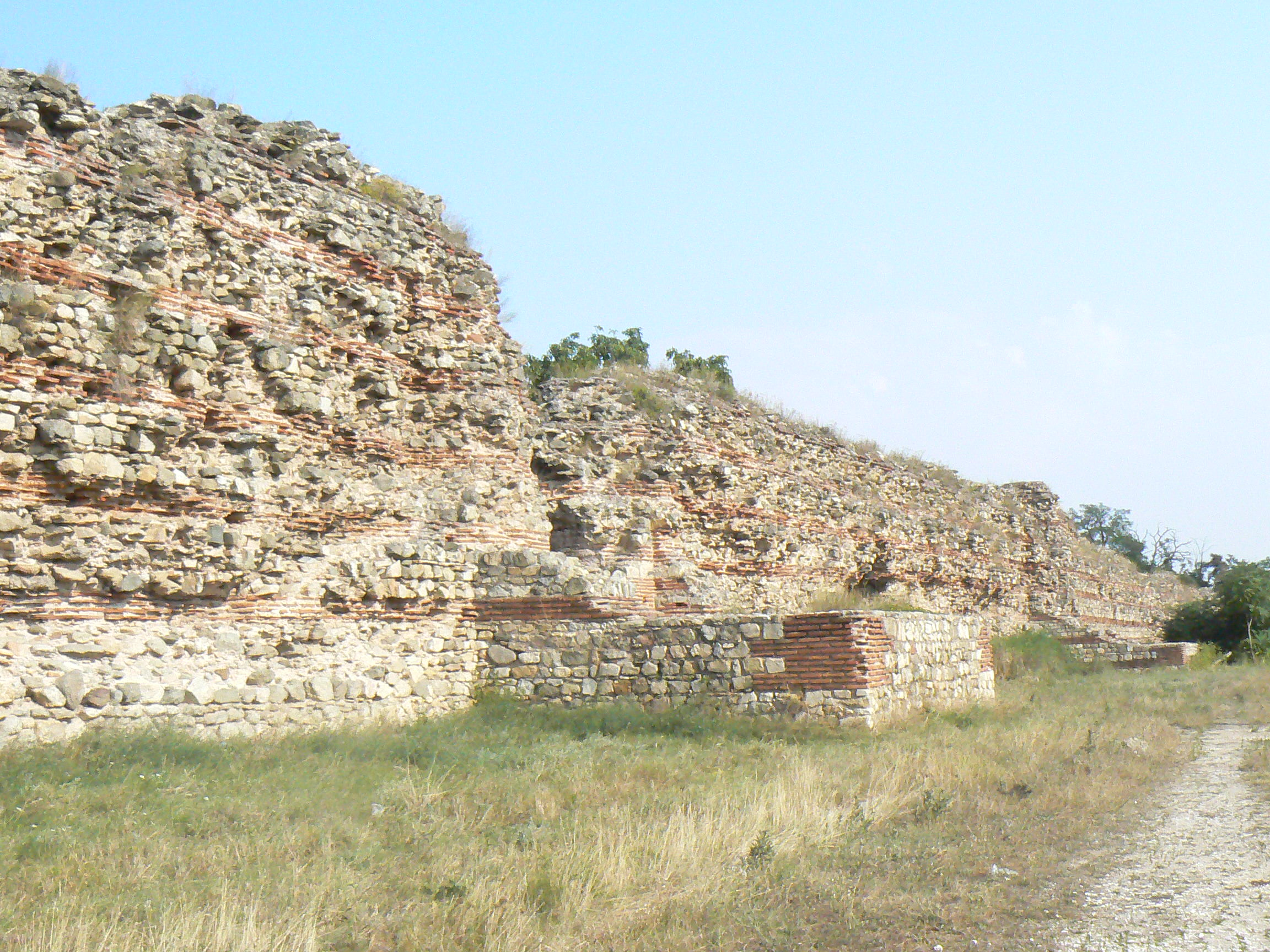
Walls of the Hissarya fortress

The economy of the province is of great importance. The agricultural production is intensive and efficient with high levels of irrigation. The major crops are fruit (apples, plums, pears, cherries), grapes, melons and watermelons, vegetables (tomatoes, peppers, carrots, cabbage, potatoes), wheat, rice, barley and others. Industry is very well developed: ferrous metallurgy near Plovdiv; thriving electronics industry in Plovdiv, Saedinenie, Voivodinovo, Radinovo and other villages in the area; agricultural machinery (tractors) in Karlovo; weapon and military plants in Sopot, Karlovo, Plovdiv; chemical industry in Plovdiv, Asenovgrad; food industry is developed almost everywhere, most notably in Plovdiv and Asenovgrad (wines). Tourism is a growing industry with the rich cultural heritage of the province and the numerous mineral springs which are of international importance.

== See also ==
- List of villages in Plovdiv Province
