= Dink =

Dink or DINK may refer to:

== Places ==
- Dink, Plovdiv Province, a village in Bulgaria
- Dink, West Virginia, an unincorporated community in the United States
- Dink Island, Palmer Archipelago, Antarctica

== Entertainment ==
=== Characters ===
- "Dink" Dunkin, a child detective in the A to Z Mysteries novel series
- Dink Jenkins, in the 2000 film My Dog Skip, played by Luke Wilson
- Dink Meeker, in the Ender's Game series of books by Orson Scott Card
- the main character of Dink Smallwood, a role-playing video game made in 1997
- Dink Stover, in stories and novels by Owen Johnson
- Bud Dink, on the Nickelodeon and Disney television series Doug
- Dink, a child character in the 1931 film The Champ, played by Jackie Cooper
- Dink, in the 1953 film The Clown, a remake of The Champ
- Dink (James Bond), a woman in the James Bond film Goldfinger
- The title character of Dink, the Little Dinosaur, a 1989 children's animated series by Ruby-Spears
- Dink, a recurring character in the TV series Private Practice
- Dink, in the animated TV series Cubeez
- Dinks, a group of munchkin-like characters in red robes in the 1987 movie Spaceballs

=== Other ===
- Dink (band), an American industrial rock band
- "D.I.N.K", a season 2 episode of Sanjay and Craig
- The Dink, an American comedy film about the sport of pickleball
- DINKS, American sitcom

== People ==
- Dink (nickname)
- Arat Dink (born 1979), Turkish journalist
- Hrant Dink (1954–2007), Turkish-Armenian editor and journalist
- Claude Giroux (wrestler) (born 1956), midget wrestler who used the ring name Dink
- Oliver Humperdink (born John Sutton 1949-2011), professional wrestling manager who used the ring name Big Daddy Dink

== Slang ==
- DINK (Dual Income, No Kids), a working, cohabiting or married couple who do not have children
- Beanie (seamed cap), occasionally known as a "dink" in the context of American college hazing
- In first-person shooter games, a headshot that does not kill the player
- Dinks was one of the derogatory terms used to refer to the Viet Cong or NVA.
- In New England, dink is a slang term for a rude, obnoxious, or otherwise unhelpful person.

== Sports ==
- In footvolley, hitting the ball over the net with one's head
- In pickleball, a soft shot made by a player while near their own non-volley zone, into their opponent's non-volley zone
- In soccer, chipping the ball lightly
- In sportfishing, an undersized, unwanted catch
- In tennis, a soft drop shot
- In volleyball, tapping the ball just barely over the net after faking a spike

== See also ==
- Dinker (disambiguation)
- Dinking (disambiguation)
- Dinky (disambiguation)
- Rinky Dink (disambiguation)
