= Economy of Plovdiv =

The city of Plovdiv is the second only to Bulgaria's capital Sofia in economic importance and output. It is a major industrial, commercial, financial and shopping centre.

Recently, Plovdiv has one of the country's fastest growing economies with average GDP growth of 12-13%. As of 2005 the total revenues are 9.4 billion leva (approximately 4.8 billion euro), which is with 88% more than in 2001. The profits for the same period rose 4.5 times. The unemployment is 6,5% which is lower than the national average. One of recent problems are municipality's administrative borders which almost completely coincide with the city limits. Due to the constant increase of investments which are $465,000,000 for 2005 some of the businesses have to be redirected to the Maritsa or Rodopi municipalities such as the industrial zone of Radinovo village.

== History ==
Located in the middle of a rich agricultural region, since the beginning of the 20th Plovdiv grew as a major industrial center. Food processing, tobacco, brewing and textiles were the main pillars of the industry. During socialism the city's economy greatly expanded dominated by heavy industry - it still produces large amount of lead and zinc, machinery, electronics, motor trucks, chemicals, cosmetics. Between 1966 and 1969 in Plovdiv was assembled the sports car Bulgaralpine as a result of the cooperation of Alpine and ETO Bullet. In 1967 a car-assembly factory which produced Bulgarrenault under the license of the French automotive manufacturer Renault was inaugurated but production was halted in early 1970. After the fall of Communism in 1989 and the collapse of Bulgaria's planned economy, a number of industrial complexes were closed.

== Industry ==
Industry has been expanding again since the late 1990s, with numerous modern manufacturing plants built in the city or in its outskirts, mainly the municipality of Maritsa. In this period, some €500,000,000 has been invested in construction of numerous new factories. Some of the biggest new plants include the Liebherr refrigerator plant with more than 2000 employees and a capacity of 1 000,000 items per year, the Socotab tobacco processing plant (2,000 employees), a bicycle plant (500 workers, capacity 500,000 units), а Schneider electronics factory, a biodiesel plant, the Bulsaphil textile plant (790 workers), and several electronics and high-tech plants producing CD players and other electronic equipment. The largest electronics plant in the Balkans was inaugurated in the nearby village of Voivodinovo. Watts Industries group owns a modern factory for manufacture of temperature measurement equipment which employs 300 high-qualified personnel. Another significant factory is Saninelli which produces cloth and has 1,400 employees.

Plovdiv is the seat of one of the oldest breweries in the country, Kamenitza, founded in 1881. Currently Kamenitza is the leading national beer company with market share of 18%. The brewery is situated in the Eastern district and employs 650 workers.

Due to the growing demand for business office space Business Park Plovdiv is going to be constructed in the district of Trakiya. The investment is for €68,000,000 and the future park will occupy a built area of 110,000 m^{2}. A commercial and industrial park is to be built in the village of Radinovo at several km to the north-west of the city with a built-up area of 50,000 m^{2}.

Industrial region Thracia is an industrial zone made up of several municipalities within the area of Plovdiv, Bulgaria.

== Shopping and commerce ==
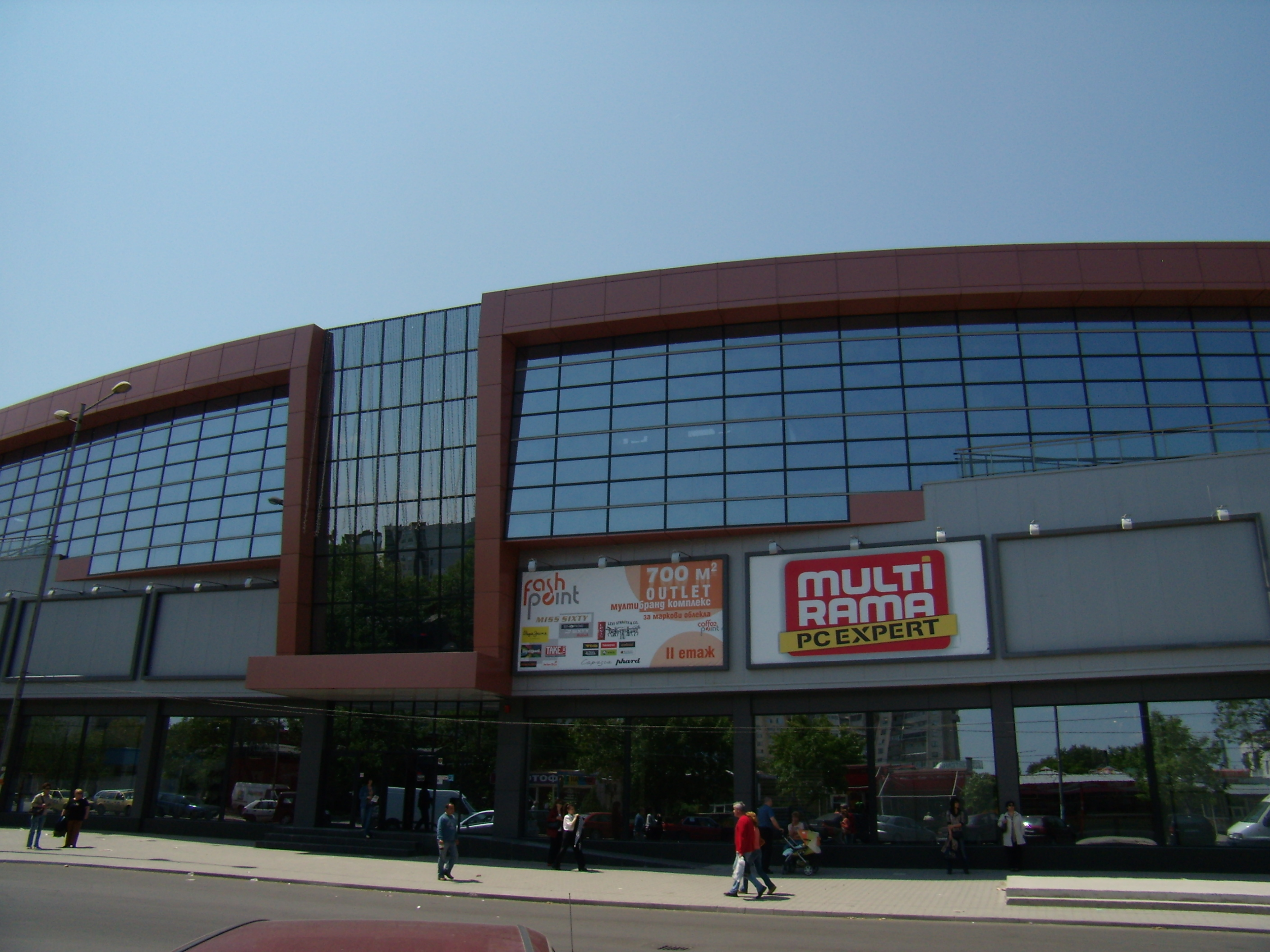
A new trade center in the Trakiya District.

Commercial sector is among the fastest developing businesses in the city. A number of new modern trade centers have been built mainly in the Central district and the district of Trakiya. Those include Trade Center Grand, Market Center and two more all on the Kapitan Raycho Street, Forum in Trakiya, Excelsior and others. There are several malls under construction - the €40 mln. Mall of Plovdiv with shopping area of 40,000 m², 11 cinema salons and a parking for 700 cars, €50 mln. Central Mall Markovo tepe, a huge €60 mln. mall and hotel complex in the district of Trakiya as well as several other projects planned or under construction.

Several huge hypermarkets have been built in recent years mainly in the outskirts of the city: Metro, Kaufland, Sani (2 outlets), Praktiker, Billa, Mr. Bricolage, Baumax, Technopolis, Technopark Europa and others. The main shopping area is the central street with its numerous shops, cafés and restaurants. A number of pleasant cafés, craftsmen workshops and souvenir shops are situated in the Old town and the small streets in the centre, known among the locals as "The trap" (Bulgarian: Капана).

The Plovdiv International Fair, held annually since 1892, is the largest and oldest fair in the country and all of southeastern Europe, gathering companies from all over the world in an exhibition area of 138,000 m^{2} located on a territory of 352,000 m^{2} on the northern banks of the Maristsa river with beautiful buildings, green spaces, ponds and even a railway. It attracts more than 600,000 visitors from different countries.

The city also has a duty-free zone since 1987. It has a customs terminal handling cargo from trucks and trains.
