= Trakia Economic Zone =

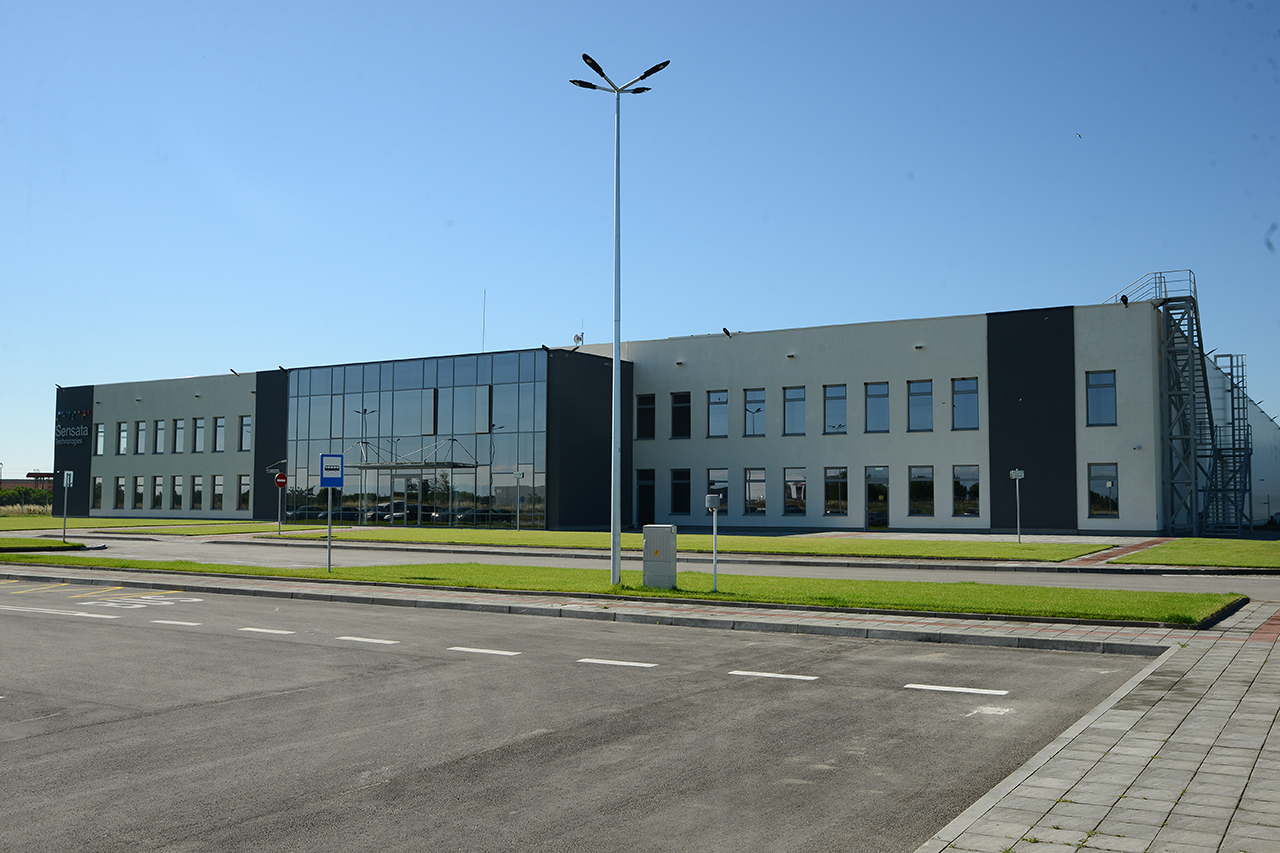
- Type: Public-private partnership
- Industry: Engineering, Electronics, Commerce

Trakia Economic Zone (TEZ) in Plovdiv is an industrial and commercial area and one of the biggest economic projects in Bulgaria. It includes six major industrial zones in the region of Plovdiv with a total area of 1,070 ha (2,600 acres) of which 325 ha (800 acres), is occupied. More than 200 Bulgarian and multinational companies operate in TEZ, employing over 45,000 people.

Since 1995, TEZ has attracted over EUR 1.1 billion of fixed-capital investments. Thanks to the achievements of Trakia Economic Zone, the city of Plovdiv has ranked amongst the top three in the category "FDI strategy" in the ranking “European cities of the future 2018/2019 (Top 10 Small European cities of the Future 2018/2019)” of the Financial Times. It is located 2 km from the City Center of Plovdiv.

== Industrial zones in Plovdiv City ==
Plovdiv consists of six industrial zones.

=== Maritsa Commercial and Industrial Zone ===
Industrial Zone Maritza is located in Plovdiv Province, within the territory of Maritsa Municipality and comprises parts of three villages, namely Radinovo, Tsaratsovo and Benkovski.

The area's development started at the end of the 1990s, with a number of industrial facilities of foreign investors, such as Liebherr, Ferrerro, and Socotab, getting off the ground. The zone has grown to cover approximately 500,000 m2 and is the long-term home for more than 30 of the largest industrial and logistic companies in the country.

The successful development of Industrial Zone Maritza is due to the excellent infrastructure and the important international roads in proximity, including the Trakia motorway (A1) to Sofia, Burgas, and the Middle East and the important second class II-64 road Plovdiv–Karlovo, which continues as the second class II-86 road south of Plovdiv, leading to Smolyan and the Bulgaria–Greece border. In addition, the railway line Plovdiv–Panagyurishte passes through the zone. The proximity to Plovdiv (6 km), the second largest city in Bulgaria, provides the necessary human resources for the activities of the companies in the zone. The connection with the central gas pipeline for South Bulgaria and the constructed 110 kV electrical substation provides the energy security of the companies.

Location: Industrial Zone Maritza

Area: 5 000 000 sq.m.

Industries: Engineering, Electronics, Food, Logistics

Large Companies: Liebherr, Socotab, Latecoere, Schneider Electric, Sensata, Osram, DB Schenker, Maxcom, TED

Located near the highway Trakia
Area	Industry	Distance from Plovdiv	Investors
500 ha	Machine industry, Electronics industry, Food industry, Logistics		Bulgaria: Agri Bulgaria, Bella Bulgaria Fresh Logic, Maxeurope, Biofresh, Motocar Service, TED USA: Socotab, Sensata Technologis; Germany: Osram, Liebherr, DB Schenker, Intrama, Ferrero Bulgaria, Winterhalter; France: Schneider Electric, Latécoère; Holland: Royal Dutch Shell; Japan: SMC; Norway: Viking; Greece: Jumbo

=== Rakovski Industrial Zone ===
Industrial zone Rakovski is located in the region of Plovdiv, near the village of Stryama and on the territory of Rakovski Municipality.

About 85% of the area is already occupied by several large industrial investors in the logistics and production sector, such as Kaufland Bulgaria, ABB Bulgaria, Ixetic, Zobele, Fine Jarsey, “Brunata” and many others.

Location: Rakovski

Area: 1 000 000 sq.m.

Industries: Automotive, Chemistry, Textile, Logistics, Food, Energy equipment

Large Companies: ABB, Magna International, Kaufland, Zobele, William Hughs, Brunata

Located next to Stryama, municipality Rakovski
Area	Industry	Distance from Plovdiv	Investors
100 ha	Automotive industry, Chemical industry, Food industry, Logistics, Textile industry	14 km	Bulgaria: Rubikon, Intercitrus, Sigi Trans, Sweet World, ZBE, Unicom, Strom USA: Socotab, Sensata Technologies; Germany: Kaufland; England: William Hughes, Naish Felts; Switzerland: ABB; Canada: Magna International; Italy: Zobele, Sofiawax; Spain: Percotex, Lampshades

=== Kuklen Industrial and Commercial Zone ===
The industrial zone of Kuklen covers about 1,000,000 m2, and it is located in the town of Kuklen, between Plovdiv and Asenovgrad.

The Kuklen Industrial Zone is home to Bulgaria's largest non-ferrous metal production company, KCM 2000, as well as several international companies, such as Mecalit, Techni Aktas, and Farba.

The successful development of Industrial Zone Kuklen is due to the excellent infrastructure and the proximity of the main Plovdiv – Asenovgrad – Smolyan and the ring road to Sofia and Bourgas. Nearby is also Plovdiv Airport, which provides opportunities for logistics of people and cargo by air. The railway line Plovdiv – Asenovgrad passes through the zone, and there is a stop – “Mavrudovo”- making transporting goods and passengers possible. The proximity to Plovdiv (8 km) and Asenovgrad (8 km) provides the necessary human resources for the activities of the companies in the zone. A main gas pipeline, as well as a 110 kV power line, passes through the area, ensuring the companies' energy security.

Location: in Kuklen town and 8 km from Plovdiv Airport

Area: 1 000 000 sq.m.

Industries: Machinery, Chemistry, Automotive, Metals, Logistics

Large Companies: Mecalit, Techno Aktas, KCM 2000, Spinner, Wille Elbe, Fabra

Located next to the village of Kuklen
Area	Industry	Distance from Plovdiv	Investors
100 ha	Metallurgy, Automotive industry, Chemical industry, Food industry, Logistics	10 km	Bulgaria: Non-Ferrous Metal Processing Plant, Agria Germany: Mecalit, Willi Elbe Automotive, Spinner; Turkey: Techno Aktas, odelo Farba Lighting Group

=== Agro Center Kaloyanovo ===
Agro Park Kaloyanovo is located on an area of 800 000 m2 and contains several modular logistic buildings with combined infrastructure. The park is located on Karlovo roadway within Kaloyanovo Municipality. The buildings are made of universal modular sections with an area of 2 000 m2 each and the total built-up area of the complex is about 60 000 m2. The zone is primarily oriented towards businesses related to traditional agriculture and bio-agriculture.

20 km away from the Agro Park Kaloyanovo passes Trakia highway, as the main road to South Bulgaria and a connection with Sofia, Burgas and the Middle East.

Location: in Kaloyanovo village

Area: 800 000 sq.m.

Industries: Food, Packaging, Chemicals, Food Equipment

Located next to Kaloyanovo
Area	Industry	Distance from Plovdiv	Investors
80 ha	Organic farming, Food industry	22 km	

=== Trakia Hi-Tech Park Innovation ===
High-Tech Innovation Park aims to be a bridge between China and Europe. It is an important part of the Chinese strategy of “Economic belt along the Silk Road” and is planned as a logistic center for goods from China to Europe and vice versa. Strategically positioned on both sides of the Trakia highway, the park is at the crossroads between Europe and Turkey.

The plan is to build a Chinese commercial center, exhibiting goods and services, as well as a modern logistic center for exporting/importing goods between China and Europe.

Through different models such as online to offline (О2О), business to business (B2B), business to business to customer (B2B2C) or business to customer (B2C), the commercial and logistic center will service clients from all over the world.

Already in the first phase of the project, another 15,000 new jobs will be available.

Location: Trakia Economic Zone

Area: 2 600 000 sq.m.

Industries: Exhibition and e-commerce modern logistic center

Located near the highway Trakia
Area	Industry	Distance from Plovdiv	Investors
260 ha	Agriculture, Food industry	12 km	

=== Education and Hi-Tech Park ===
Located in Plovdiv
Area	Industry	Distance from Plovdiv	Investors
30 ha	High tech, Technological innovation	-	
