= Manolsko Konare =

Manolsko Konare Манолско Конаре
- Village
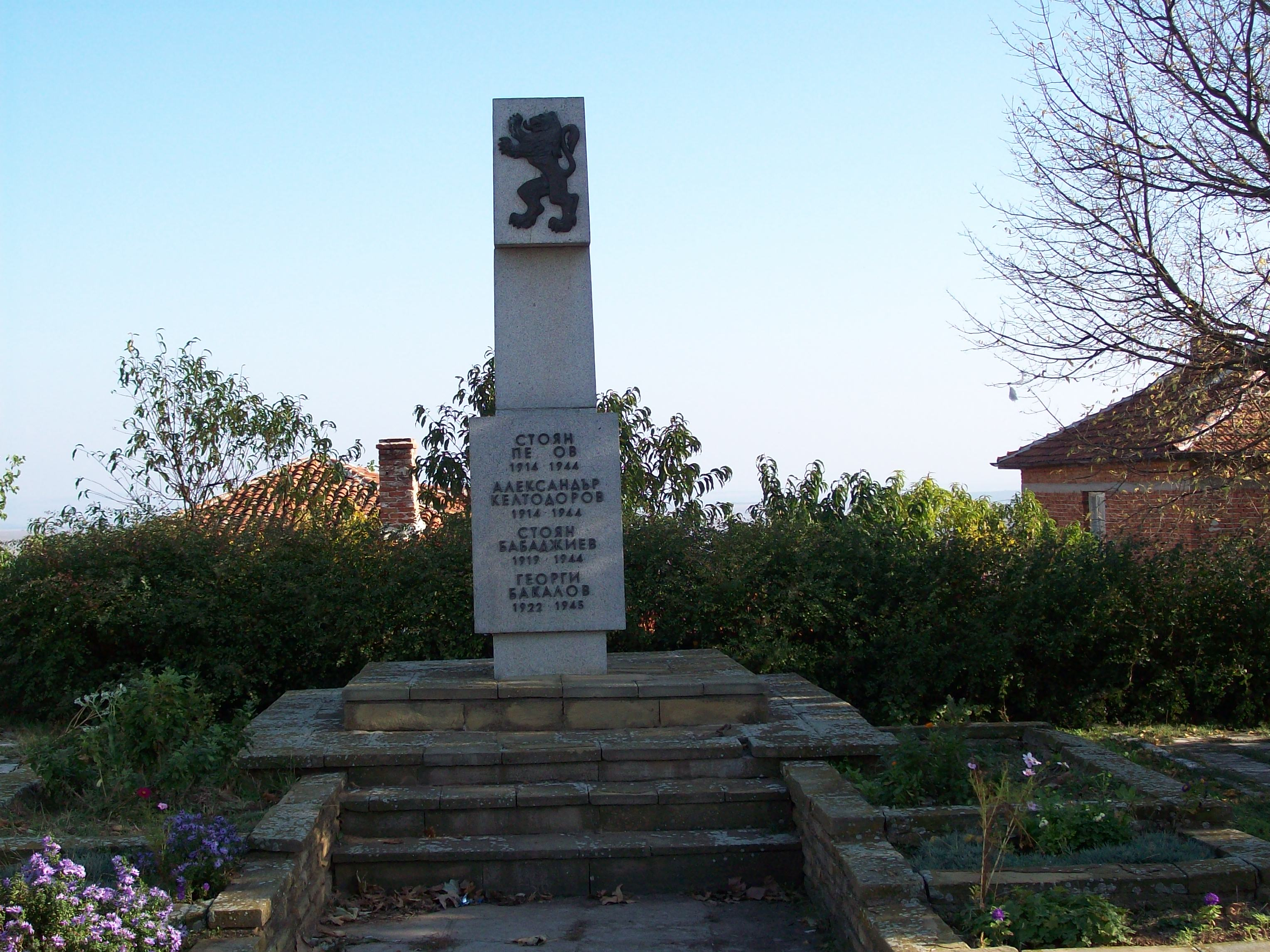
- Photo of the monument of fallen liberators in the center of the village

- Location within Bulgaria
- Coordinates: 42.2°N 24.95°E
- Country: Bulgaria
- Province: Plovdiv Province
- Municipality: Maritsa Municipality

Area
  - Land: 13.429 km^{2} (5.185 sq mi)
- Elevation: 152 m (499 ft)

Population
  - Total: 632
  - Density: 47.1/km^{2} (122/sq mi)
- Postal code: 4138
- Area code: 03105

Manolsko Konare (Bulgarian: Манолско Kонаре) is a village in southern Bulgaria, in Maritsa Municipality, Plovdiv Province. The population of the village is 632 people as of June 2020.

== Geography ==
Manolsko Konare is located in the Upper Thracian Plain, 21 kilometers away from Plovdiv. It is situated at an elevation of 199 meters and has a total area of 1348,5 hectares.

== History ==
The first written sources found about the village date from around the year 1700.

The origins of the settlement first appeared in the area "Yurtishta" which is 2 kilometers west of the current location of the village. During the 19th century, the majority of the village's population dies due to the plague epidemic.

== Infrastructure ==
The church in the village was built in 1903, and suffered significant damage during the 1928 Chirpan–Plovdiv earthquakes. The inhabitants of the village constructed a smaller temple next to it, which they attended until 1999, when the church was rebuilt and consecrated as "Sv. Teodor Tiron and Stratilat".

The first school of Manolsko Konare was built in 1899. The edifice in which it used to be was closed in 2008 due to an insufficient number of pupils.

In 1939 the high-school building was elevated. It is used to this day, as the edifice for the schools of Manolsko Konare and Yasno Pole.

In Manolsko Konare, there is also a community hall and library "Probuda", which was built in 1929.

In the center of the village, a monument of the fallen in liberation wars can be found.
