= Kalekovets =

Village in Plovdiv Province, Bulgaria

Kalekovets Калековец
- Village
- Location within Bulgaria
- Coordinates: 42.233°N 24.817°E
- Country: Bulgaria
- Province: Plovdiv
- Municipality: Maritsa

Area
  - Total: 17.994 km^{2} (6.948 sq mi)
- Elevation: 161 m (528 ft)

Population (2020)
  - Total: 2,659
  - Density: 152/km^{2} (390/sq mi)
- Postal Code: 4147
- Tel. Code: 03124
- Vehicle registration: PB

Kalekovets (Bulgarian: Калековец) is a village in Maritsa Municipality, Plovdiv Province, Bulgaria. As of 2006 it has 2,613 inhabitants.

== Geography ==
The village is 14 km northeast of Plovdiv. Nearer to Plovdiv is the village Voivodinovo, and after Kalekovets the village Stryama. The town Rakovski is also located in the vicinity. The village itself is 180 meters above sea level and is almost in the center of the Upper Thracian Plane. Its area is 17,000 ha. Near the village, at about 1 km northeast, the river Stryama can be found.

== History ==
The village was created at around 1711 by a Turkish feudal lord, who hired 17 workers to work on his land. Later, he gave them land and they settled there and began 17 families.

During the ages, the land was covered in trees: oaks, elms, and other evergreens, which helped the villagers to make charcoal and were sold outside the village as well.

== Culture ==
There is a community center in which citizens can learn traditional dances and singing. The library is also located in the building. Around 380 children attend the village's school.

== Celebrations ==
On 24 May, a traditional festival is held in Kalekovets.

== Notable people ==
Maria Atanasova is the first woman commander of a heavy-type airplane in the world and the first commander of a nuclear-powered passenger airplane in Bulgaria.
