= Dinking =

Dinking may refer to:

- Dinking, a manufacturing process used in die cutting
- Dinking, the act of performing a dink, and a learned skill, in various sports including:
  - Footvolley
  - Pickleball
  - Soccer
  - Tennis
  - Volleyball

== See also ==
- Dink (disambiguation)
- Dinker (disambiguation)
- Drinking
