= Benkovski, Plovdiv Province =

Benkovski
- Village
- Бенковски
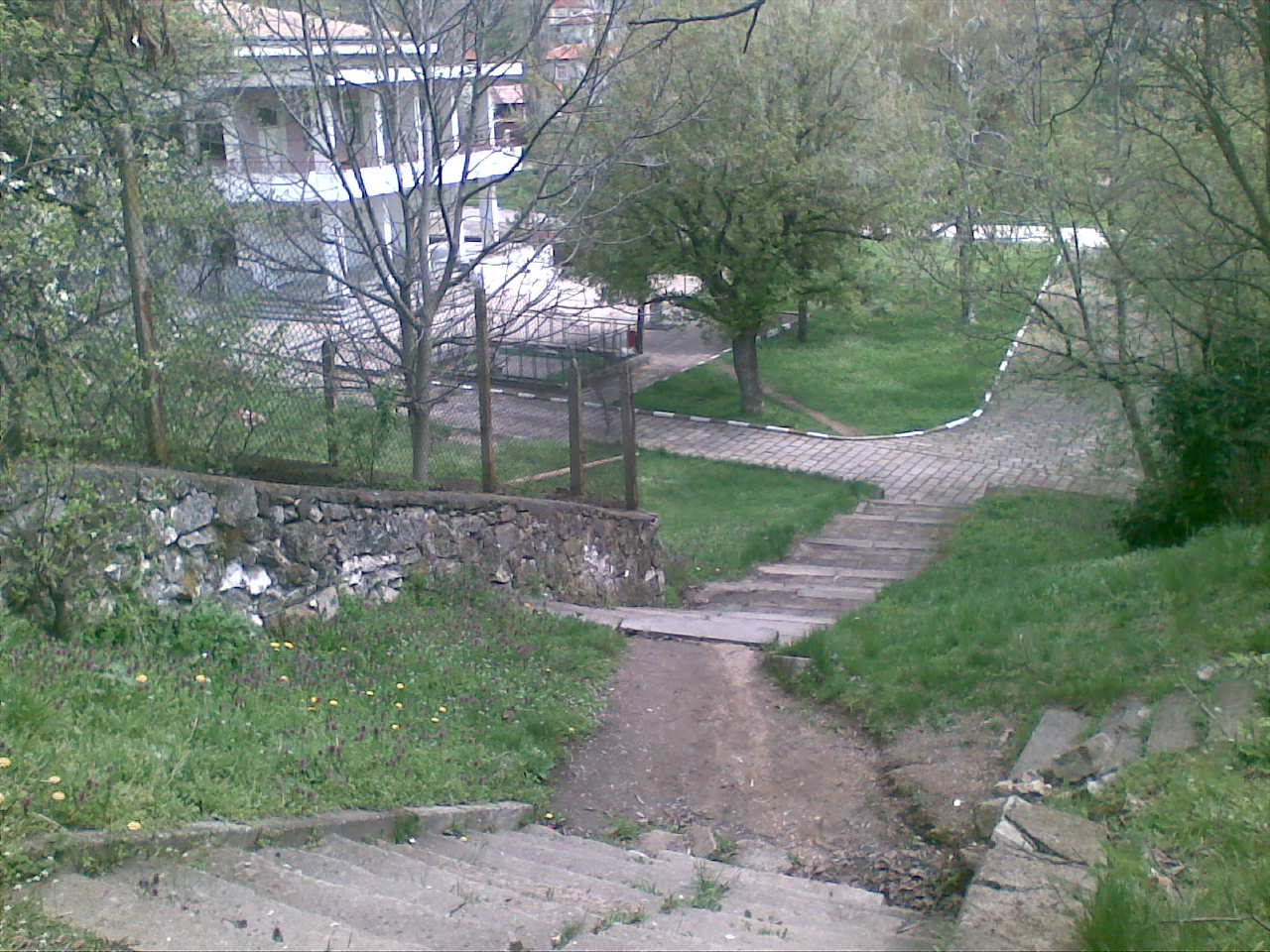
- A Park in Benkovski village

- Location within Bulgaria
- Coordinates: 42.216667°N 24.65°E
- Country: Bulgaria
- Province: Plovdiv Province
- Municipality: Maritsa Municipality

Area
  - Total: 16.284 km^{2} (6.287 sq mi)
- Elevation: 181 m (594 ft)

Population
  - Total: 1,273
  - Density: 78.2/km^{2} (203/sq mi)
- Postal code: 4201
- Area code: 0318

Benkovski is a village in Southern Bulgaria, located in Maritsa Municipality, Plovdiv Province. The village, as of June 2020, has a population of 1273 people, registered with a current address there.

== Geography ==
Benkovski is located in the Upper Thracian Plain with an elevation of 163 meters above sea level. It is situated 12 kilometers South West from Plovdiv. The total area of the village is 1689,3 hectares.

The main two harvests the villagers gather are carrots and potatoes.

== History ==
The earliest sources state that the village was created around 1576 under the initial name of Marzyan. In 1939, the village was renamed as Benkovski. It used to be a Municipality with three other villages under it - Benkovski, Radinovo and Voisil.

== Infrastructure ==
A large part of the population works in the nearby village Radinovo due to the well-developed industrial area there.

=== Public edifices ===
- Church "Sv. Troitsa" was built during 1880. In 1975 the church was announced as a cultural monument of national heritage due to its murals and its altar.
- Public hall and library - "Vasil Levski", built in 1930.
- The primary school's name is "Georgi Benkovski" and was built in 1927.
