= Krislovo =

- Village
- Крислово
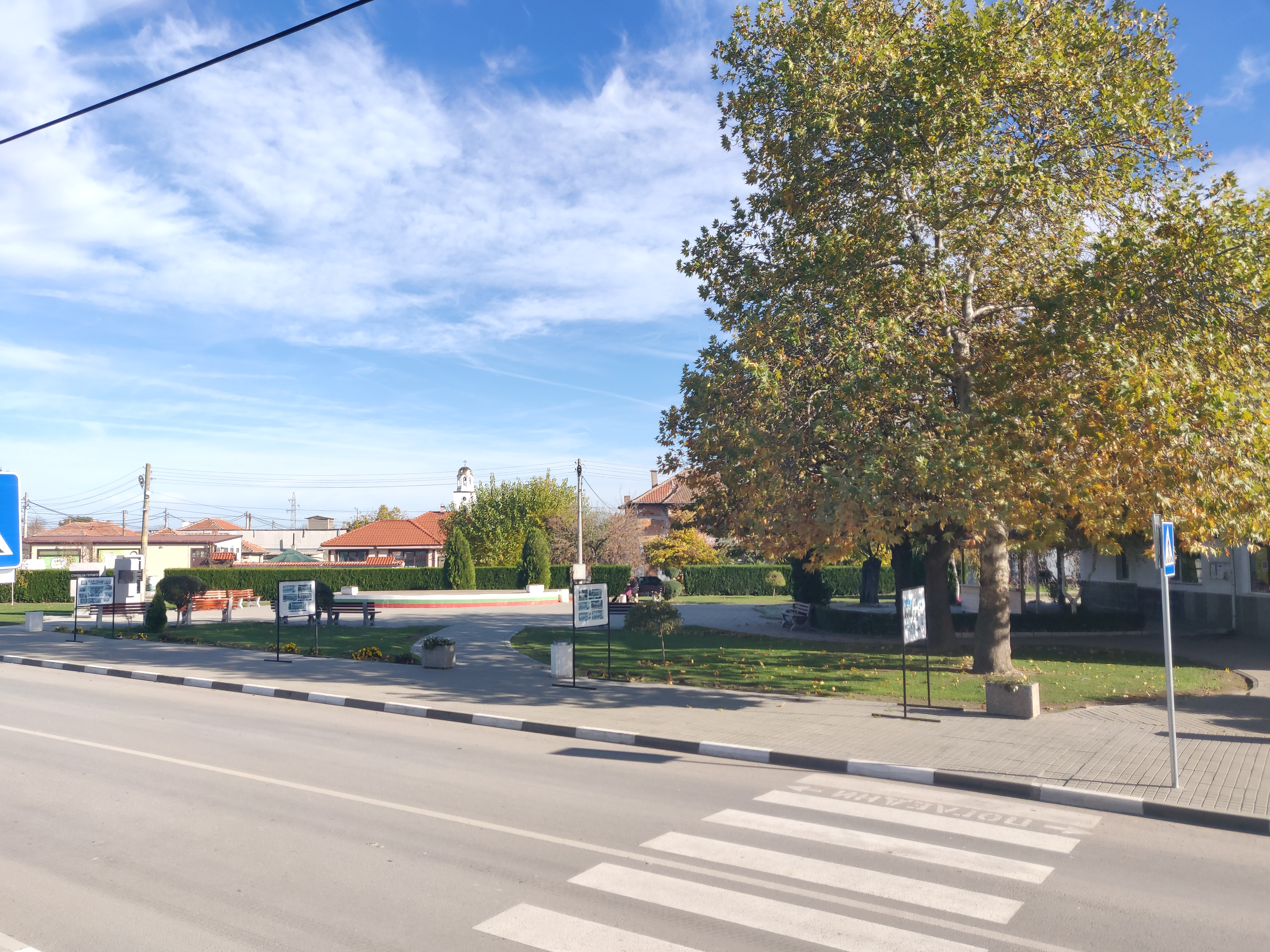
- Krislovo

- Location within Bulgaria
- Coordinates: 42.25°N 24.783333°E
- Country: Bulgaria
- Province: Plovdiv Province
- Municipality: Maritsa Municipality
- Elevation: 176 m (577 ft)

Population
  - Total: 591
  - Density: 87.6/km^{2} (227/sq mi)
- Postal code: 4148
- Area code: 03124

Krislovo (Bulgarian: Крислово) is a village in Southern Bulgaria in Maritsa Municipality, Plovdiv Province. As of June 2020, the village has a current population of 591 people.

== Geography and etymology ==
Krislovo village is located in the Upper Thracian Plain, 13 kilometers west of Plovdiv, with an area of 678,1 hectares.

The first name of the village used to be Sharkilyoi or "Шаркильой", as spelled in Bulgarian language. The current name of the village comes from two words – Kri and Slovo, which mean hiding words. The name comes from medieval times where Bulgarian people used to hide important documents from Ottoman oppressors in the village.

== Culture ==
There are three notable buildings in the village Krislovo.

The church "Rozdhestvo na Presveta Bogoroditsa" was built before the 18th century, and found in 1930. The old building was demolished in the great 1928 Chirpan–Plovdiv earthquakes.

The first school of the village is named "Sv. Sv Kiril and Metodii" – which was built during 1928, near the reconstructed church. The school is not currently operational.

The third public building in the village is the community hall and library "Prosveta", which was also built during 1928. Most people in the village are into agriculture and livestock breeding. Many people commute to Plovdiv for work.

The villagers are cohesive and are known to work together in difficult times. In 2017, after a series of robberies, with the little they had, they collected a sum to invest in video security CCTV to be installed in key locations of the village.

A Youth Centre was built in 2020.
