= Trilistnik =

Trilistnik Трилистник
- Village
- Location within Bulgaria
- Coordinates: 42.2°N 24.866667°E
- Country: Bulgaria
- Province: Plovdiv Province
- Municipality: Maritsa Municipality
- Elevation: 160 m (520 ft)

Population
  - Total: 826
  - Density: 72.4/km^{2} (188/sq mi)
- Postal code: 4141
- Area code: 03121

Trilistnik (Bulgarian: Трилистник) is a village in Maritsa Municipality, Plovdiv Province, southern Bulgaria. The population of the village, as of June 15, 2020, is 836 people.

== Geography ==
Trilistnik village is located in the Upper Thracian Plain, 15 kilometers southeast of Plovdiv, near the Stryama river and Trakia motorway. The total land area of the village is 1183,9 ha.

== History ==
Trilistnik was established around 1890 with the initial name of Trifil. Until the Liberation of Bulgaria in 1878, the village was mainly inhabited by Turks. The name "Trifil" comes from the Turkish word for a clover.

In the past, the Turkish people living there had the main livelihood of cattle breeding due to the good conditions for pasture around the area. When Bulgaria won the liberation war, the Turkish population fled.

Bulgarian people from the nearby villages took advantage of the abandoned good lands and relocated from neighboring villages to the village, renaming it to Trilistnik.

=== Infrastructure ===
The village has a church named "Sveta Paraskeva", which was built in 1902, and later destroyed in the 1928 Chirpan–Plovdiv earthquakes.

The school of the village was built in 1902 and later rebuilt in 1928 with the new name of "Otets Paisii".

There is a local community hall and library "Svetlina" which used to be in the school. It was established in 1928. The new building of the community hall was raised in 1961.

There are two monuments in the center of the village, honoring the fallen in the wars for national liberation and unification.
