= Church of Saint Stephen, Pazardzhik =

Church of Saint Stephen
- Църква Свети Стефан (Bulgarian); Սուրբ Ստեփանոս եկեղեցի (Armenian)
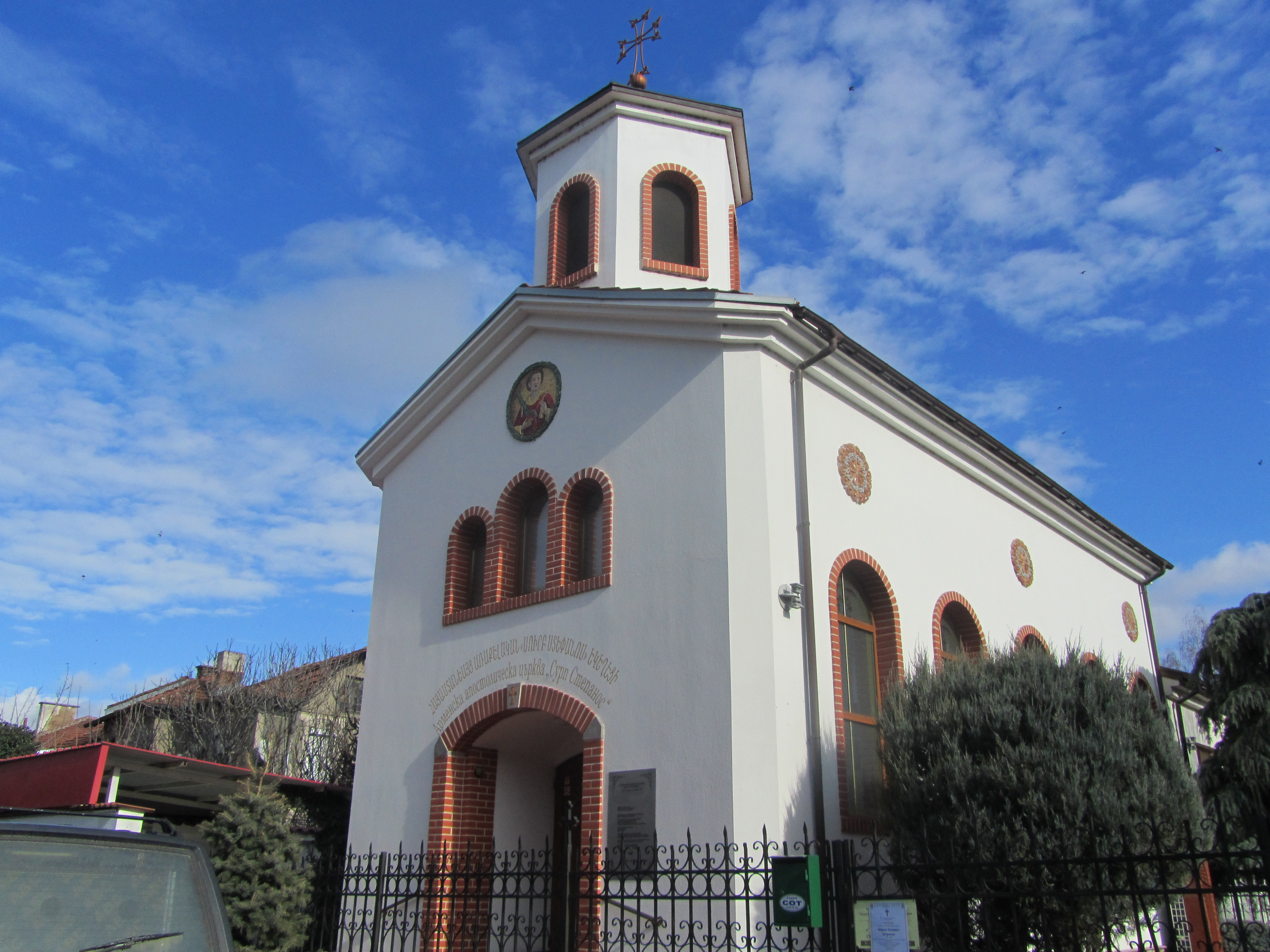
- Church of Saint Stephen
- 42°11′11″N 24°19′47″E
- Location: Pazardzhik
- Country: Bulgaria
- Denomination: Armenian Apostolic Church

History
- Consecrated: 18 December 2011

Architecture
- Functional status: Active

Church of Saint Stephen (Bulgarian: Църква Свети Стефан, Armenian: Սուրբ Ստեփանոս եկեղեցի, romanized: Sourp Stepanos Church) is an Armenian Apostolic church located in Pazardzhik, Bulgaria.

== History ==
Earliest Ottoman documents mentioning the church and an existence of an Armenian community here were from the 13th century. Since no known data has been found on when the exact construction began, it is likely that it continued as a new building, since it was said to be consecrated in the 18th century. It was then burnt down.

Armenian settlers from Armenia constructed a new church in 1820, which was demolished during the 1928 Chirpan–Plovdiv earthquakes. It was shortly later rebuilt. A fire happened on 13 June 1946, which burnt all church furniture inside.

On 6 October 1947, the foundation stone of the last church was laid. On 2 May 1948, it was consecrated. It was burnt 3 times during communism in Pazardzhik. In 1969, it was demolished due to the then construction of the bus station.

The first groundbreaking of the church was made on 4 July 2005. The consecration took place on 18 December 2011. At the consecration, a holy stone was laid in the altar of Etchmiadzin Cathedral.

== Armenian Cultural Club ==
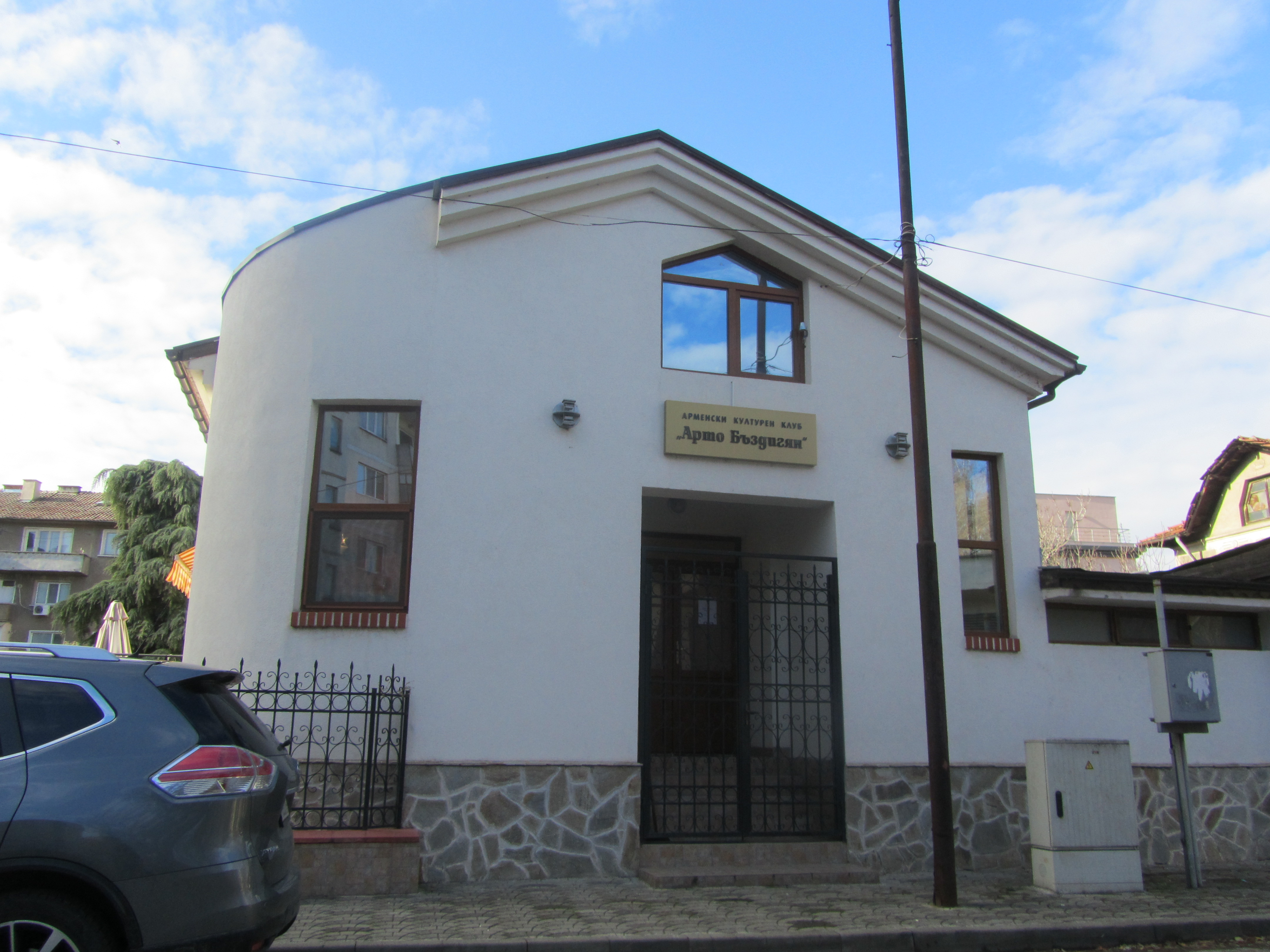
The Armenian Cultural Club ''Arto Bozdigian''

The church is home to Armenian Cultural Club ''Arto Bozdigian''. It was founded on 30 September 2017. It is named after Arto Bozdigian – a promoter and initiator of the restoration of the Armenian Church in Pazardzhik.

The official opening was attended by the Vicar of the Armenian Apostolic Orthodox Church of Bulgaria Isaac Poghosyan, the spiritual pastor of the community in Pazardzhik Protopresbyter Kevork Khachiaryan, the chairman of the church board Nerses Shirinyan, Nishan Bozdigyan, many representatives of the community, journalists.
