= Rogosh =

Rogosh Рогош
- Village
- Location within Bulgaria
- Coordinates: 42.183333°N 24.866667°E
- Country: Bulgaria
- Province: Plovdiv Province
- Municipality: Maritsa Municipality

Area
  - Total: 27,538 km^{2} (10,632 sq mi)
- Elevation: 199 m (653 ft)

Population
  - Total: 3,109
  - Density: 113/km^{2} (290/sq mi)

Rogosh (Bulgarian: Рогош) is a village in southern Bulgaria, located in Maritsa Municipality, Plovdiv Province. As of 15 June 2020, the village has a population count of 3109 people.

== Geography ==
The village is located in the Upper Thracian Plain, 7 kilometers northeast of the city of Plovdiv, at an altitude of between 100 and 199 meters. The total area of the village is 2711,2 ha.

=== Infrastructure ===
The school in Rogosh, is named after Vasil Levski, and was established in 1867. During the Ottoman rule, the school did not have a roof and was in the backyard of one of the houses in the village.

The church in the village of Rogosh was constructed in 1866.

There is also a community hall with a library, which was established in 1927.

== History ==
The village is estimated to be established in 1576 under the names of Rogush and Kebar, which later broke into two villages - Golyam Rogosh and Malak Rogosh, respectively Big and Small Rogosh. The village was first located 12 kilometers east of Plovdiv but was later relocated due to Ottoman attacks. The village was relocated in 1760.

During the 1920s, the village hosted a Tolstoyan Colony for a short period of time.

=== Notable people ===
- Todor Chonov - Bulgarian poet
- Zhelyazko Hristov - Confederation of Independent Syndicates in Bulgaria chairman
