= Trud, Plovdiv Province =

Trud Труд
- Village
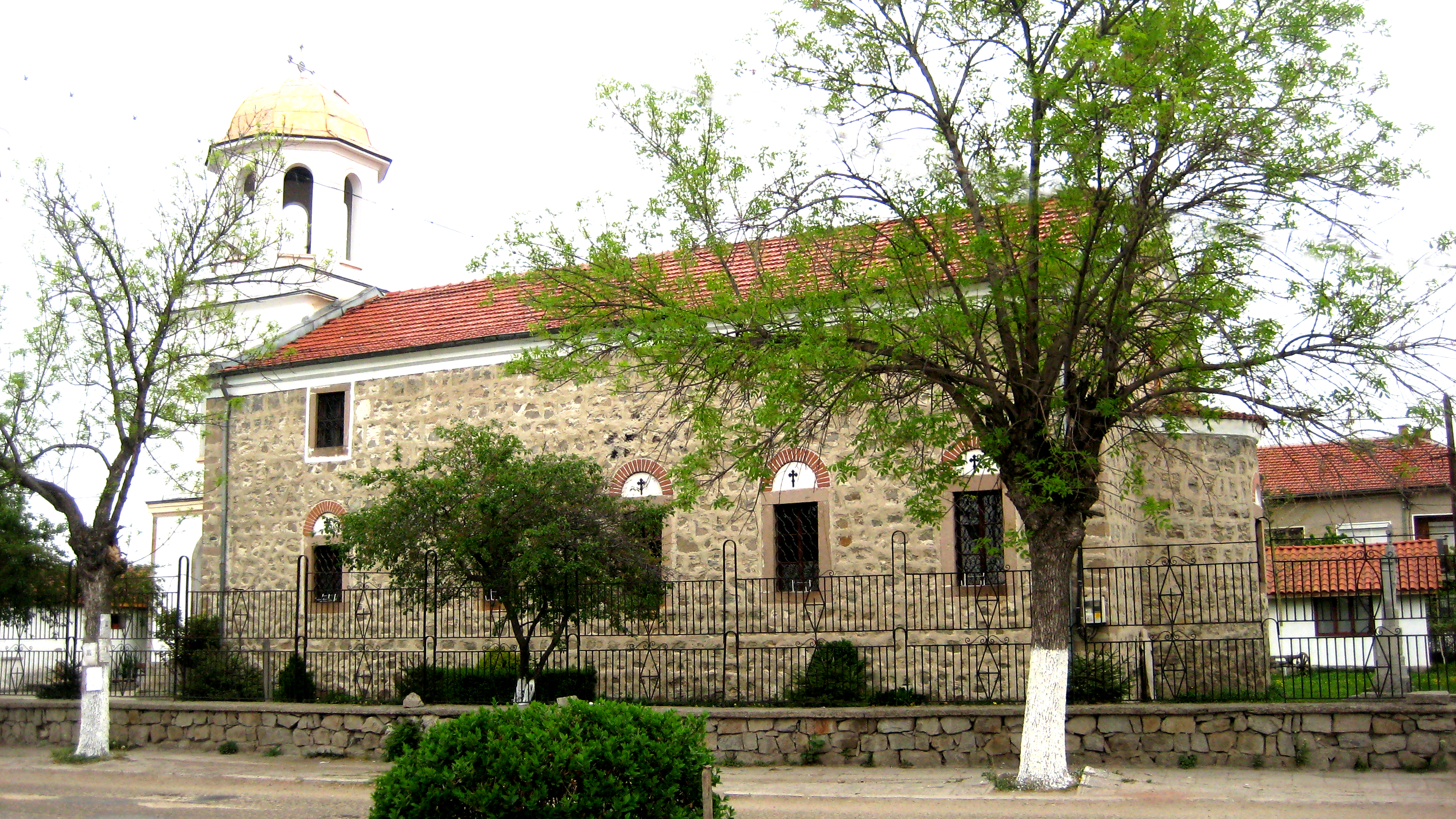
- The Church in Trud

- Location within Bulgaria
- Coordinates: 42°13′55″N 24°43′41″E
- Country: Bulgaria
- Province: Plovdiv Province
- Municipality: Maritsa Municipality

Area
  - Land: 39.797 km^{2} (15.366 sq mi)
- Elevation: 182 m (597 ft)

Population
  - Total: 4,017
  - Density: 101/km^{2} (260/sq mi)
- Postal code: 4199
- Area code: 03126

Trud is a village in Southern Bulgaria, located in Maritsa Municipality, Plovdiv Province. The total population count as of the June 2020 Census is 4017 people.

== Geography ==
Trud village is in the Upper Thracian Plain, 11 kilometers North from the city of Plovdiv. The average elevation of the village is 175 meters above sea level. The total land mass are of the village is 3965 ha.

There are several natural landmarks around Trud. There is a century-old tree of an age over 300 years. The tree bears the name of "Arnautski Dub".

=== Landmarks ===
Six mounds form the area "Dense Mounds" near the village. In the proximity there are 9 mounds more, none of which has been excavated for archeological purposes.

Necropolises have been discovered North West, South East and South from the current location of the village. A Thracian temple was discovered in the North West part of Trud. Tablets were found with the faces of heroes and the god Apollo.

Byzantine coins from the 5th and 6th century have also been discovered in the whereabouts of the village. The majority of the finds can be seen in the Archeological Museum of Plovdiv

== History and culture ==
During the 4th century, a Thracian settlement is established near the village. It originally bore the name Sgulame.

=== Infrastructure ===
- School – "Sv. Sv Kiril i Metodii" – was built during 1878, after the liberation of Bulgaria from Ottoman Rule.
- Church "Sv. Troitsa" was built in 1869 by Mincho Stari.
- Community Hall and Library "Svetlina" – built in 1929

== Gallery ==
Photos of Trud

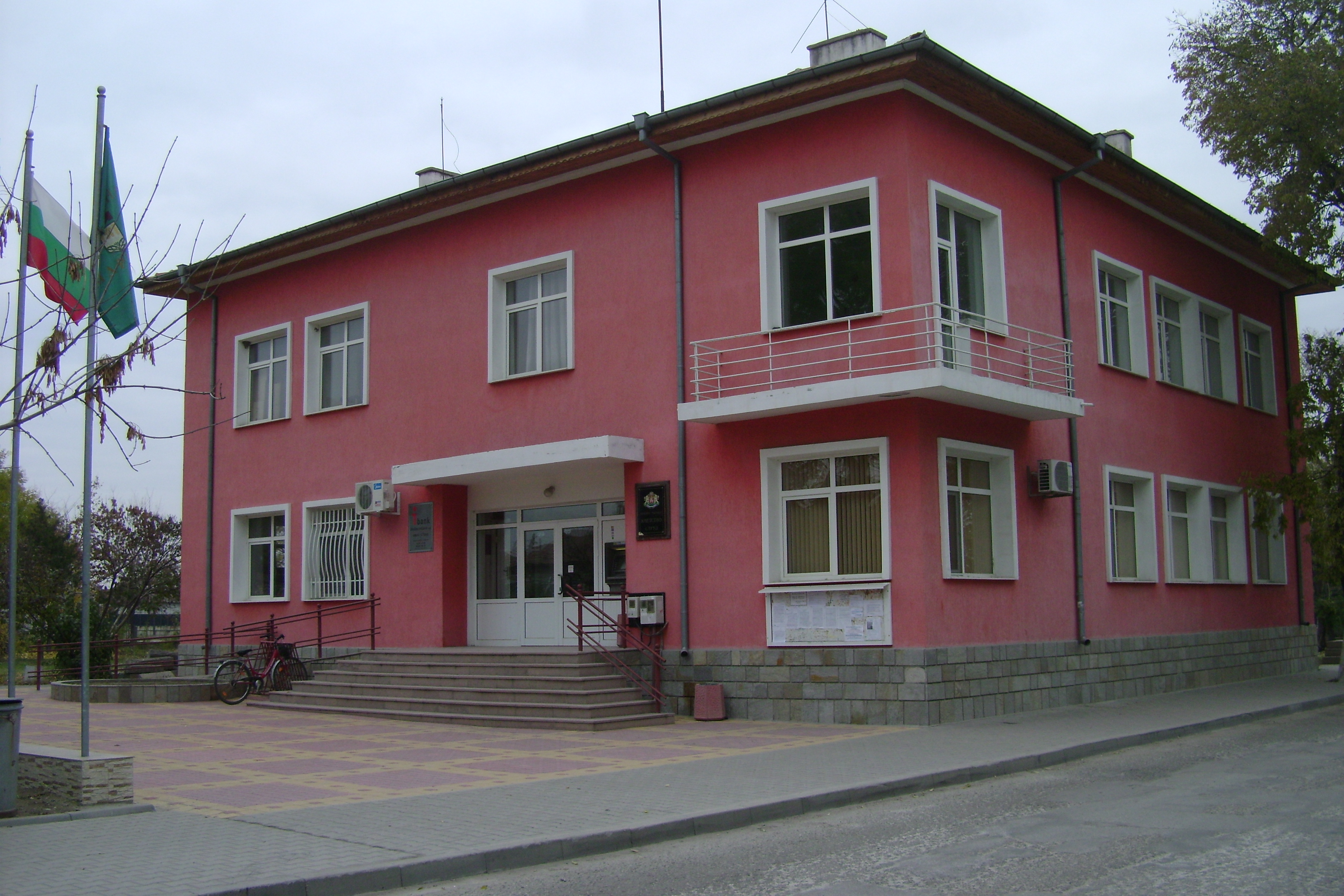
The Townhall

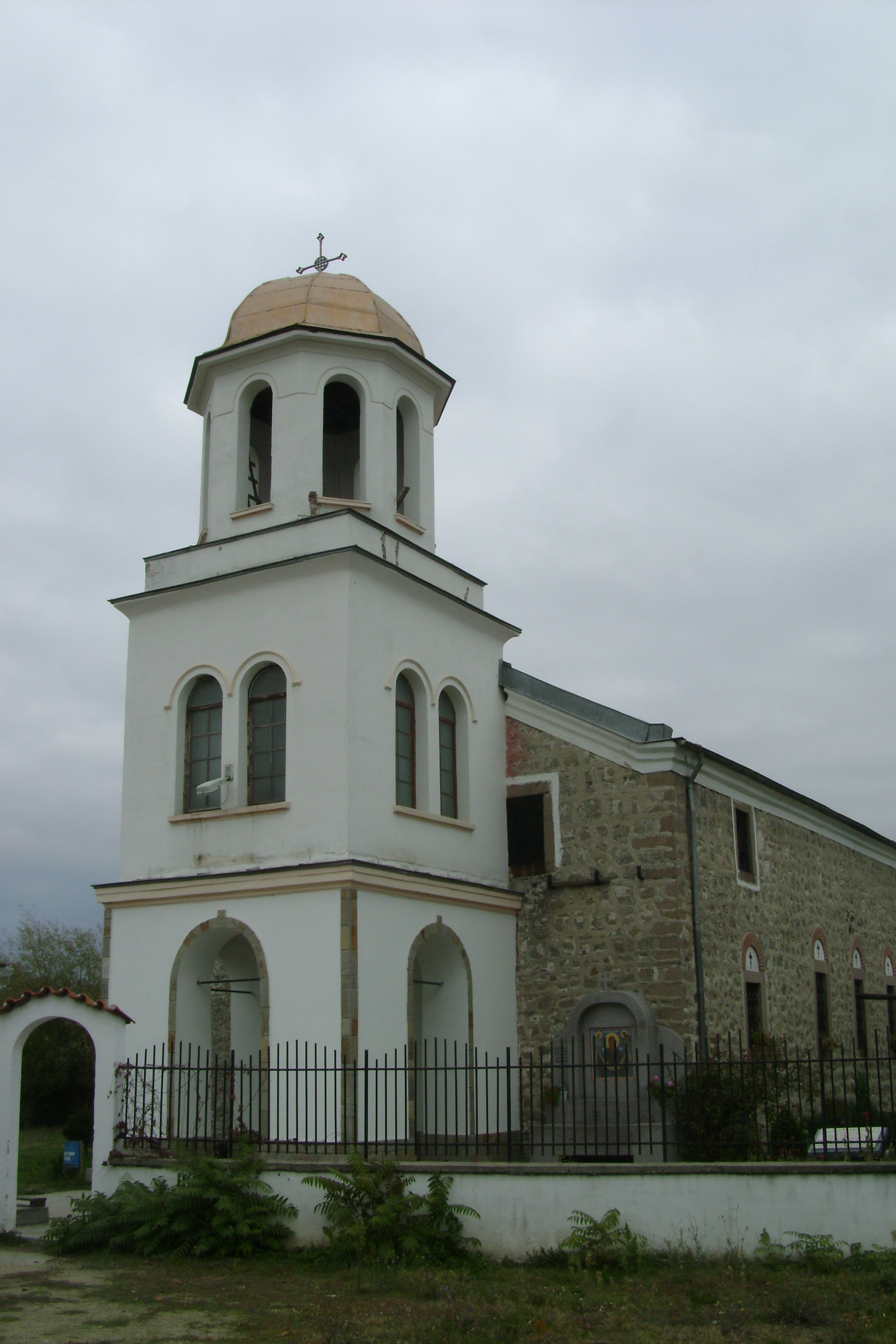
Church "Sv Troitsa"

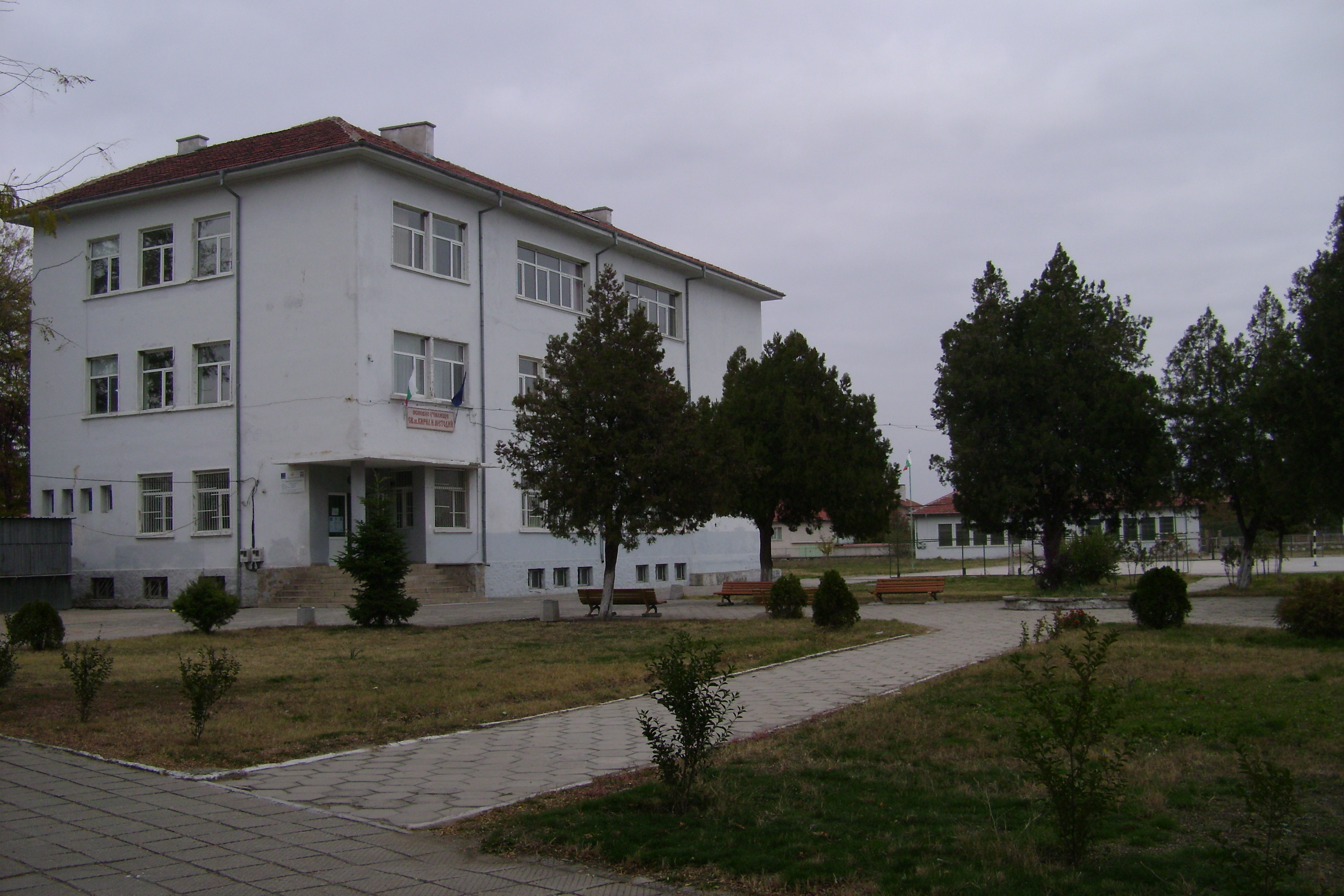
School "Kiril i Metodii"

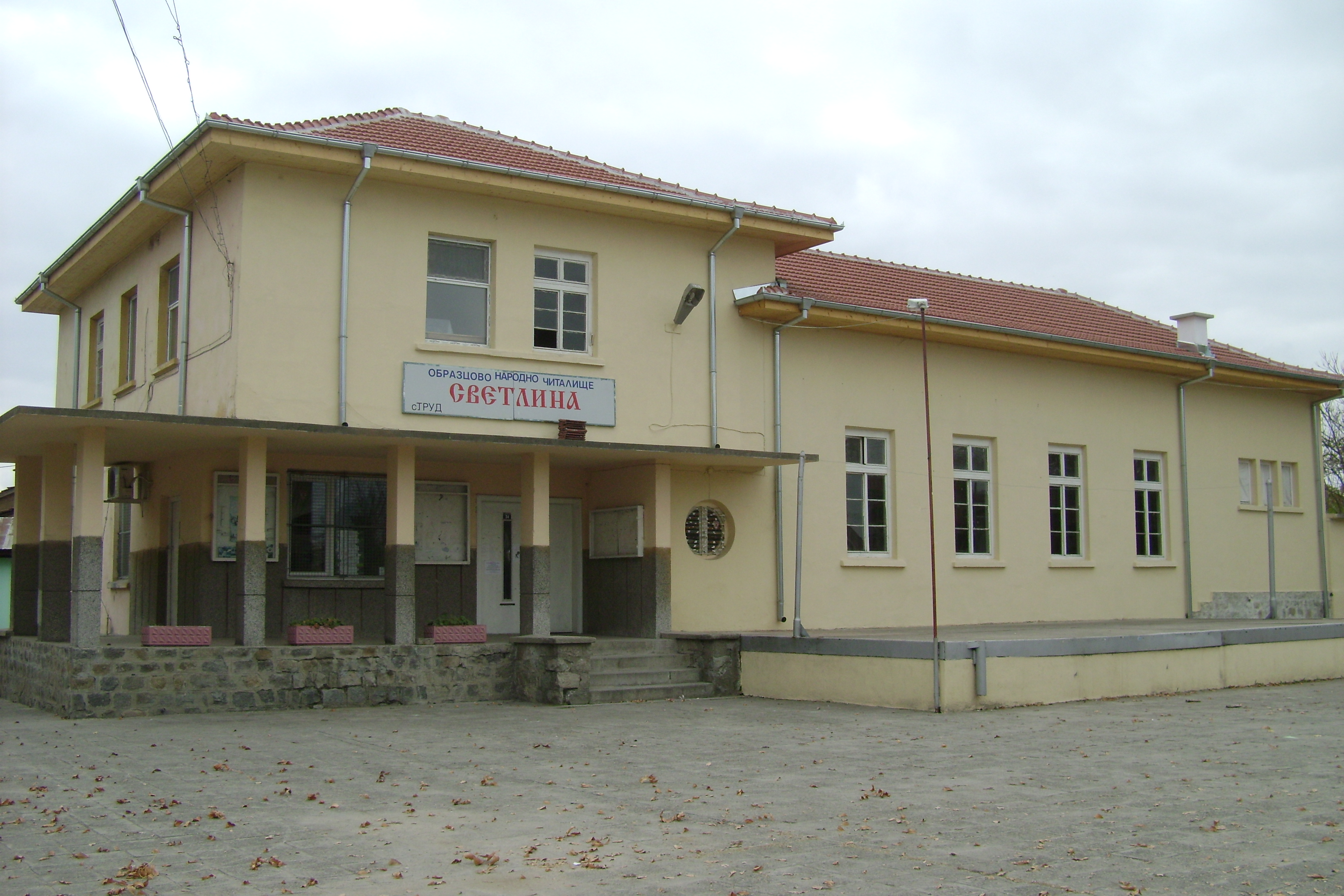
Community Hall "Svetlina"

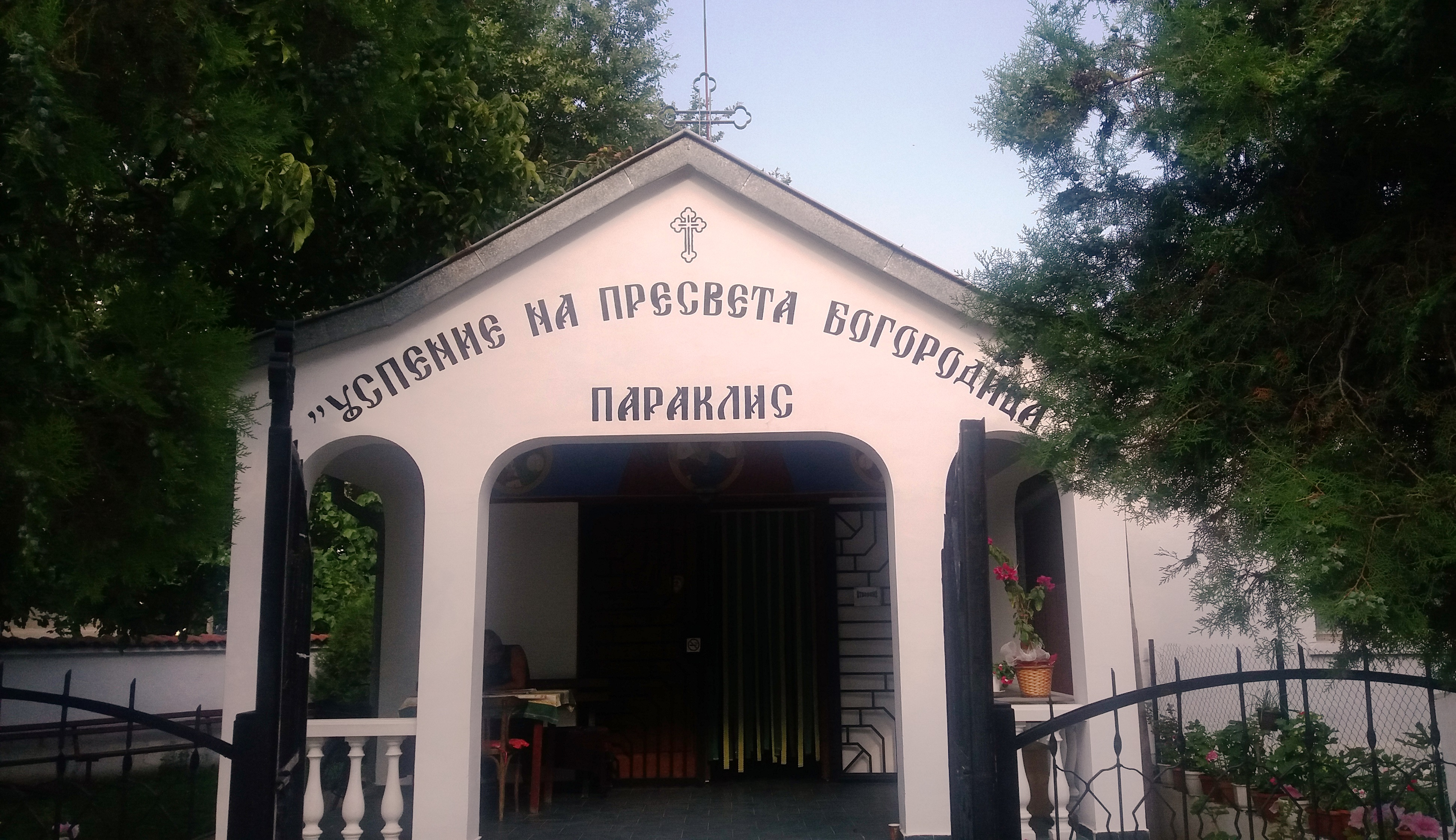
Chapel

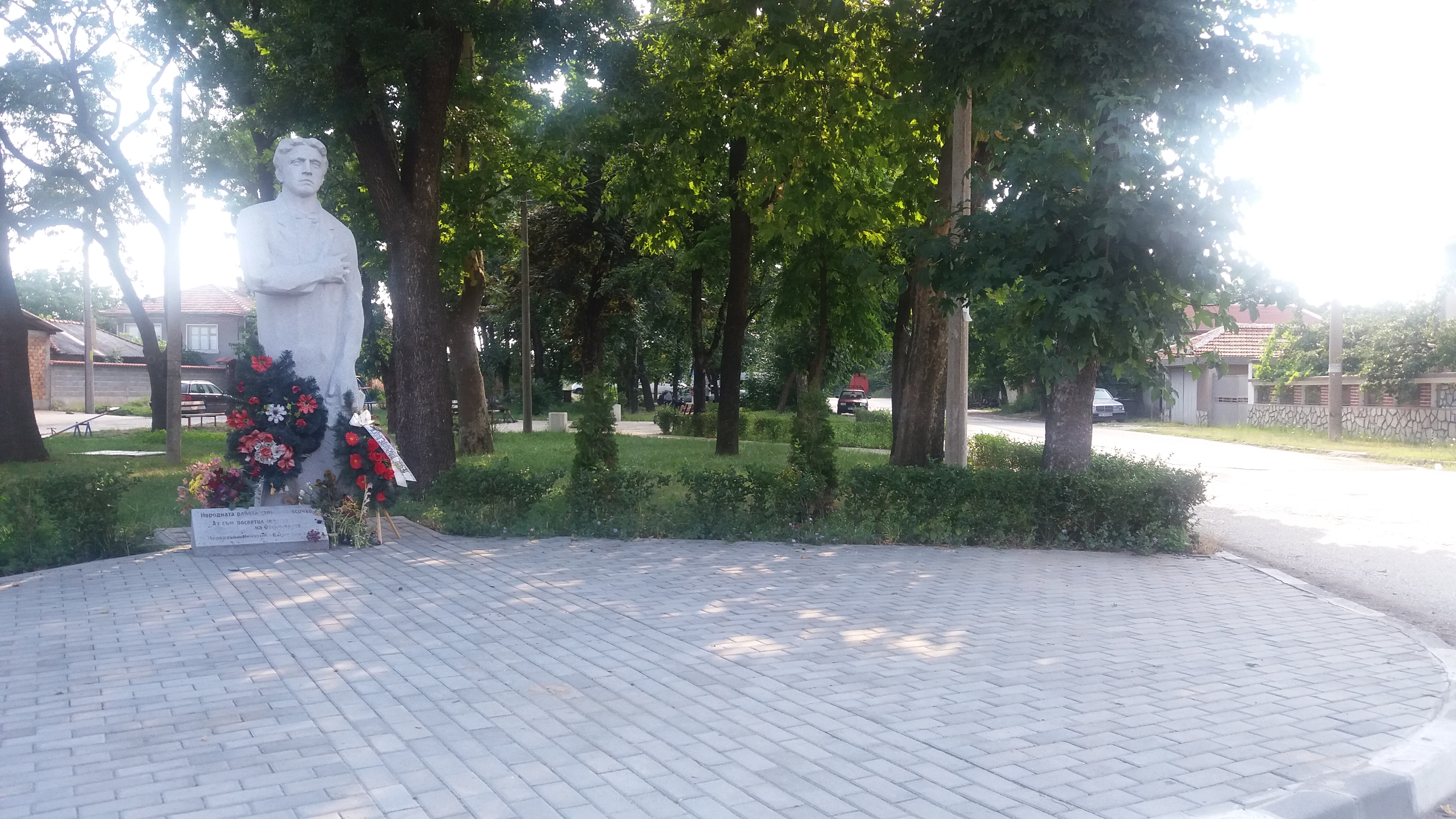
Statue of Vasil Levski
