= Dinky =

Dinky may refer to:

== Arts and entertainment ==
- Dinky Toys, a brand of die-cast toy vehicles
- Dinky (film), a 1935 film starring Jackie Cooper
- Dinky Bossetti, protagonist of the 1990 film Welcome Home, Roxy Carmichael, played by Winona Ryder
- title character of Dinky Dog, an animated segment on The All-New Popeye Hour TV series
- A poem by Theodore Roethke
- Dinky Doodle, a cartoon character created by Walter Lantz in 1924
- Dinky Duck, a character in 14 Terrytoons cartoons from 1939 to 1957
- protagonist of the novel Dinky Hocker Shoots Smack by Marijane Meaker (under the pen name M. E. Kerr) and its TV adaptation
- Dinky Little, a character in The Littles children's novel series and TV series of the same name
- Dinky Doo, a placeholder name for a background baby unicorn in the children's cartoon My Little Pony: Friendship Is Magic

== People ==
- Dinky Bingham (born 1963), African-American singer, musician, songwriter and producer
- nickname of Corazon Soliman (born 1953), Filipino politician
- nickname of Dianne Van Rensburg (born 1968), South African retired tennis player
- DINKY, acronym for "Double Income, No Kids Yet", a childless couple in which both partners receive an income
- Double Income, No Kids Yet, a British radio sitcom originally broadcast 2001–2003

== Other uses ==
- Dinky line (disambiguation) or just Dinky, slang for a short railroad line
- Dinky, nickname of the Princeton Branch commuter rail line in New Jersey
- Jackson Dinky, a line of mid-range electric guitars manufactured by Jackson Guitars

== See also ==
- Dink (disambiguation)
- Dinkytown, an area in Minneapolis, Minnesota, United States
