= Dink (nickname) =

As a nickname, Dink may refer to:

- Dink Carroll (1899–1991), Canadian sports journalist
- Dink Johnson (1892–1954), American Dixieland jazz pianist, clarinetist and drummer
- Dink Mothell (1897–1980), American baseball player in the Negro leagues
- Dink O'Brien (1894–1971), American Major League Baseball player in the 1923 season
- Dink Roberts (1894–1989), American old-time banjo player
- Dink Shannon, early 20th century American cartoonist
- Dink Templeton (1897–1962), American track and field athlete and coach
- Dink Trout (1898–1950), American actor and radio personality
- Dink Widenhouse (1932–2024), retired NASCAR Grand National Series driver

== See also ==
- Dink (disambiguation)
