= Skutare =

Village in southern Bulgaria

Coordinates: 42°11′N 24°50′E

Skutare (Bulgarian: Скутаре) is a village in the Maritsa Municipality, southern Bulgaria on the two banks of the Avramica River. As of 2006 it has 2 091 inhabitants. Skutare is situated 9 kilometres (5.6 mi) from the city of Plovdiv. A major foreign plant (Bulsafil, Italian) producing fabrics was built in the village and was one of the first large investment projects in the region.
