= Kostievo =

Kostievo Костиево
- Village
- Location within Bulgaria
- Coordinates: 42.1766°N 24.6237°E
- Country: Bulgaria
- Province: Plovdiv Province
- Municipality: Maritsa Municipality

Area
  - Total: 23.695 km^{2} (9.149 sq mi)
- Elevation: 175 m (574 ft)

Population
  - Total: 1,788
- Postal code: 4205
- Area code: 0318

Kostievo (Bulgarian: Костиево) is a village in southern Bulgaria, located in Plovdiv Province, Maritsa Municipality. As of the June 2020 Bulgarian census, the village has a population count of 1,788 people.

== Geography ==
Kostievo is located at an elevation of 175 meters (574 ft) above sea level, in the Upper Thracian Plain. It is 3 kilometers (1.9 mi) north of the Maritsa river and 11 kilometers (6.8 mi) west of Plovdiv. The total land area of the village's region is 23.695 square kilometers (9.149 sq mi).

== History ==
According to Ottoman documents, the village has existed since 1576. Its former name was Kioste.

=== Infrastructure ===
The local church of the village dates back to 1889. In 1929, the school of the village was built and still works until now. Nowadays, it bears the name of "Sv, Sv. Kiril I Metodii".

The community Hall in the village was built in 1928, and was named after "Tsar Boris III". The current building of the community hall was built in 1942.

The majority of the village works in animal husbandry, crop production and rice production. Since 2001, the village has a pharmacy. In 1991, a kindergarten was founded in the village and is still functioning.
