= Dink, Plovdiv Province =

Dink Динк
- Village
- Location within Bulgaria
- Coordinates: 42.266667°N 24.8°E
- Country: Bulgaria
- Province: Plovdiv Province
- Municipality: Maritsa Municipality

Area
  - Land: 6.118 km^{2} (2.362 sq mi)

Population
  - Total: 909
  - Density: 149/km^{2} (390/sq mi)
- Area code: 03124

Dink (Bulgarian: Динк) is a village in Southern Bulgaria, Maritsa Municipality, Plovdiv Province. As of 15 June 2020, the village has a population of 909.

== Geography ==
Dink is located in the Upper Thracian Plain, 16 kilometres (9.9 mi) southeast of Plovdiv, at an elevation ranging between 100–199 m (328–653 ft) above sea level. The village has a land area of 588.3 ha (1,454 acres) and has a bus line that reaches Plovdiv.

== History ==
During the years of Ottoman rule in Bulgaria, in Dink there were several Armenian Farms, built around 1850. There was a farm near the river, named "Dinkata", hence later the name of the village became "Dink".

=== Infrastructure ===
There is a church in Dink named "Uspenie Bogorodichno". It was destroyed in the 1928 Chirpan–Plovdiv earthquakes and was later rebuilt.

The first school in the village was established in 1905 in a private edifice. It remained functioning until 1912 or 1913, when it became governmental owned. It was built with community funds and was later destroyed during the massive earthquake in 1928. In 1929 it was rebuilt and named "Paisii Hilendarski" or "Otets Paisii".

The village also has a community hall and library named "Prosveta", which was built in 1938 and rebuilt in 2007.

In the center of the village a monument of a slain antifascist can be found.
