= Rinky Dink =

Rinky Dink may refer to:

- "Rinky Dink" (instrumental), a 1962 hit co-written and performed by Dave "Baby" Cortez
- Rinky Dink (sound system), a mobile musical sound system powered by two bicycles and solar panels
- The Rinky Dinks, the credited (fictitious) performers, due to legal issues, of the song "Early in the Morning" (Bobby Darin song)
