= Maritsa Municipality =

Coordinates: 42°13′02″N 24°47′08″E

Maritsa Municipality Община Марица
- Municipality
- Interactive map of Maritsa Municipality
- Country: Bulgaria
- Province: Plovdiv Province

Population
  - Total: 30,676

Maritsa Municipality (obshtina) is in Plovdiv Province, southern Bulgaria, on the northern bank of the Maritsa River. It has 30,676 inhabitants, and consists only of villages. The municipality has a thriving industrial base into which approximately €400,000,000 has been invested. Its administrative centre is Plovdiv, despite the city's being outside its borders.

== Religion ==
According to the Bulgarian census of 2011, the religious composition of the municipality is as follows:

Religious composition of Maritsa Municipality
Orthodox Christianity	84.4%
Catholicism	0.7%
Protestantism	1.7%
Islam	2.3%
No religion	2.9%
Prefer not to answer, others and indefinable	8.0%

== Villages in the Maritsa municipality ==
- Benkovski
- Dink
- Graf Ignatievo
- Kalekovets
- Kostievo
- Krislovo
- Manole
- Manolsko Konare
- Radinovo
- Rogosh
- Skutare
- Stroevo
- Trilistnik
- Trud
- Tsaratsovo
- Voivodinovo
- Voisil
- Yasno Pole
- Zhelyazno
