= Marija Atanassowa =

Bulgarian pilot

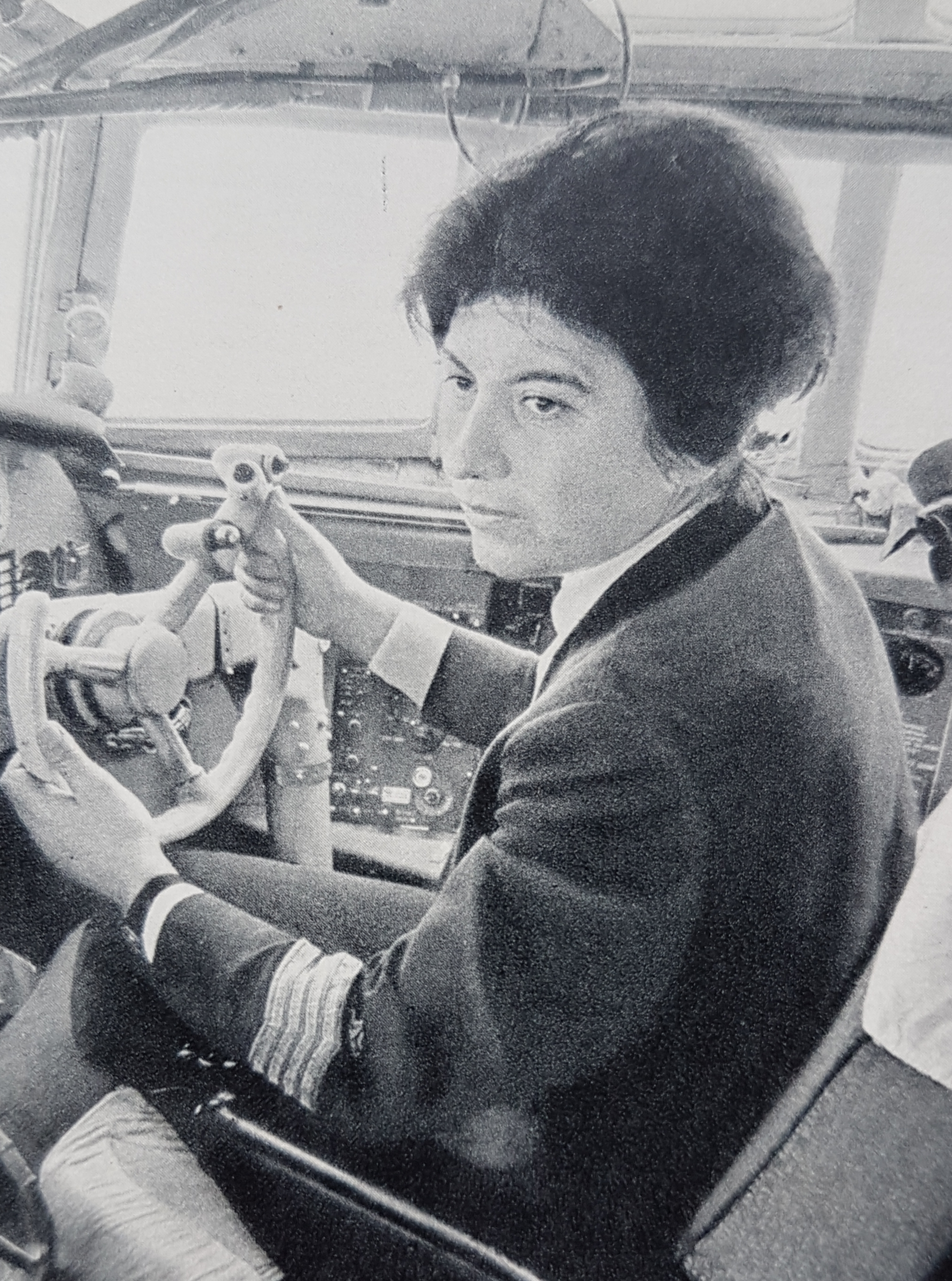
Maria Atanasova

Marija Georgieva Atanassowa (also Maria Georgieva Atanasova; in Bulgarian Мария Георгиева Атанасовa; 1926 – 2000) was a Bulgarian pilot and politician. She was the first woman civilian pilot in Bulgaria.

== Biography ==
Atanassowa's first attempt to enter the aviation industry was when she enrolled for training at the military air school at Dolna Mitropolia Air Base. Her application was declined on the grounds of her gender, however after some insistence and persuasion she and other women were admitted. Atanassowa and 12 other women graduated from the school in 1950. In 1952, she became a flight instructor, and then completed training as a fighter pilot.

From 1953 to 1974, Atanassowa was a commercial airline pilot. From 1966 to 1971 she was a member of the 5th National Assembly of Bulgaria.

In 1967, she received the Hero of Socialist Labour title, and the Georgi Dimitrov medal.
