= Tsaratsovo =

Village in Plovdiv Province, central Bulgaria

Coordinates: 42°12′N 24°41′E

Tsaratsovo (Bulgarian: Царацово) is a village in the Plovdiv Province, central Bulgaria. It is part of the Maritsa Municipality and as of 2007 it has 2,216 inhabitants.

In 2007 a several million euro electronics plant was inaugurated in Tsaratsovo. It has a built-up area of 3,000 m² and employs 80 workers.

In the same year a new bicycle-producing factory was opened near the village. It has an area of 34,000 m² of which the built-up area is 23,600 m². The plant is going to produce 500,000 bicycles a year and employs more than 500 people. Large part of the production is exported to Russia, Serbia and Montenegro.
