= Yasno Pole =

Yasno Pole Ясно Поле
- Village
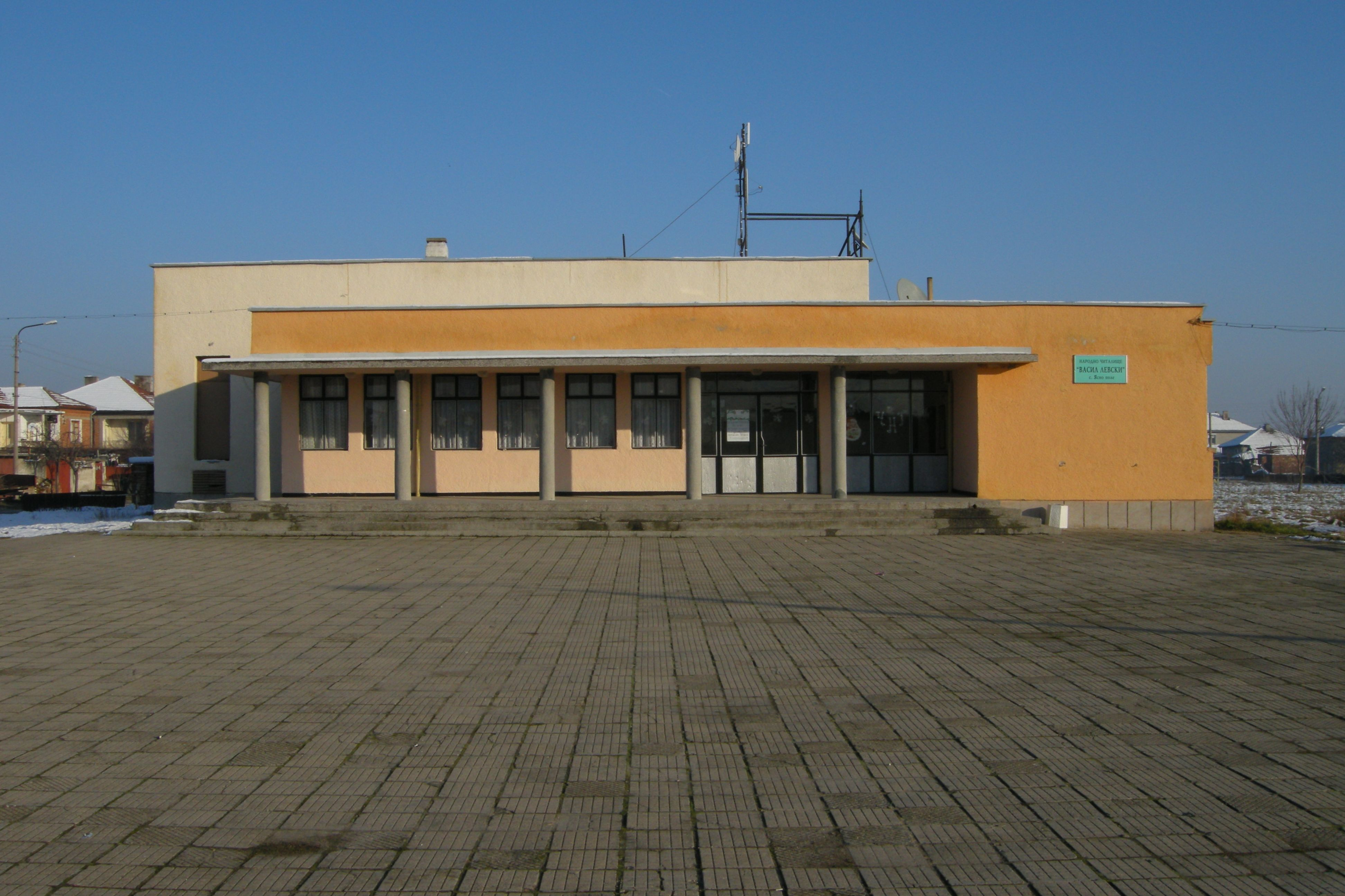
- The "Vasil Levski" Community Hall in Yasno Pole village

- Location within Bulgaria
- Coordinates: 42.233333°N 24.95°E
- Country: Bulgaria
- Province: Plovdiv Province
- Municipality: Maritsa Municipality

Area
  - Total: 10,963 km^{2} (4,233 sq mi)

Population
  - Total: 628
  - Density: 57.3/km^{2} (148/sq mi)
- Postal code: 4139
- Area code: 03105

Yasno Pole (Bulgarian: Ясно поле) is a village in Southern Bulgaria, located in Plovdiv Province, Maritsa Municipality. As of the Bulgarian 2020 June census, the village had a population of 628 people.

== Geography ==
Yasno Pole Village is located in the Upper Thracian Plain, 24 kilometers to the northeast of Plovdiv. The elevation above sea level of the village is 144 meters. The approximate land mass is 1080 hectares.

=== History ===
Yasno Pole was established in 1887 under the original name of "Chakure". The first written sources that mention the village date back to 1887 in a National newspaper.

In 1934, the village was renamed from Chakure to Yasno Pole, the name it bears now.

=== Infrastructure ===
In 1936, the village received a good enough infrastructural improvement to be electrified.

The local church "Sveti Arhangel Mihail" was built in 1895. It was severely damaged during the 1928 earthquake but was rebuilt and used to this day.

The school in Yasno Pole village was first organized in the backyard of the church. It started around 1885. In 1962 the building of the current edifice started.

There is also a community hall in the village, named "Vasil Levski", after the Bulgarian revolutionary Vasil Levski. It was built during 1936.

== Notable people ==
- Hristo Stoichkov – a renowned Bulgarian football player.
- Yordan Ivanov – Equestrian champion.
