= DINKS =

American sitcom

DINKS is an American sitcom created by Marta Kauffman and Hannah K.S. Canter, starring Paul Scheer, June Diane Raphael, and series regular Jon Gabrus.

It is the first improvised multi-camera sitcom,produced in collaboration between Amazon MGM Studios, Lionsgate Television, and Publicis Media Content Innovation, the entertainment arm of the advertising company.

== Synopsis ==
DINK is an acronym for "Dual Income No Kids". The show's official longline reads: "DINKS" follows Josh (Scheer) and Charlie (Raphael), a couple who, in the absence of a marriage or kids, decide to literally build a life together by renovating their nightmare of a dream house.

== Cast ==
- Paul Scheer as Josh
- June Diane Raphael as Charlie
- Jon Gabrus as Roman

== Production ==
=== Development ===
Co-creator Marta Kaufman has described the show as a reinvention of the multi-cam sitcom. The show is innovative for both its largely improvised format and its novel financing model, with the participation of the ad agency Publicis providing financing at the outset.

The original pilot was ordered in 2024, and the show commenced shooting its first full season in 2026. The show will be streamed on Prime Video.
