= Eastern district, Plovdiv =

District of Plovdiv, Bulgaria

Coordinates: 42°9′18″N 24°47′18″E

The Eastern district (Bulgarian: Район Източен) is a district of Plovdiv, southern Bulgaria. It has 60,535 inhabitants. The stadium of PFC Botev Plovdiv and the beer factory of Kamenitza are located in the district. The neighbourhoods of Stolipinovo and Izgrev are also situated there.
