= Radinovo =

Radinovo Радиново
- Village
- Location in Bulgaria
- Coordinates: 42°11′N 24°38′E
- Country: Bulgaria
- Province: Plovdiv
- Municipality: Maritsa

Government
  - Mayor: Traicho Kardashev (GERB/OZ)

Area
  - Total: 13.065 km^{2} (5.044 sq mi)
- Elevation: 172 m (564 ft)

Population (2015)
  - Total: 618
- Postal code: 4202
- Area code: 0318
- Vehicle registration: РВ

Radinovo (Bulgarian: Радиново, IPA: radˈinovɔ) is a village in Maritsa Municipality, Plovdiv Province, Southern Bulgarian. Its name is sometimes seen as Radenovo (Bulgarian: Радeново). As of 2006 the population is 720.

== Geography ==
Radinovo is located in the Upper Thrace lowlands, 7 km northwest of Plovdiv. It is 172 m above sea level. The village's area is 1,270.5 m^{2}.

== History ==
According to the local tradition, the village name derives from Radi (Bulgarian: Ради)—a young, unruly and brave Bulgarian—who lived in the time of Ottoman rule in Bulgaria. The village in which Radi lived the river Potoka and the modern village Voisil. The Turks kidnapped some of the prettiest girls in the village; at evening he gathered a dozen men, and together they slaughtered the Turks and freed the girls. In order to escape revenge, they ran in the thick forest; the Turks began to hunt for them so they could kill them, but could not find them. They discovered the location of Radi's house and burned it.

After this, Radi and the men settled at the place which today is Radinovo. However, this is against tradition. The historic information say otherwise, and according to it, Radinovo is an old village founded during the Middle Ages, and witnessed the Ottoman invasion. The earliest information about the village are recorded in the 1472 register, where the village is described as "Village Radin Ova Gereban" (Bulgarian: Село Радин Ова Геберан) a part of Filibe (nowadays Plovdiv). Information about the village under the names "Village Radnevo, falling towards Filibe" and "Village Radinova" of Filibe, in the entire—short—register of the Ottoman Empire of 1530.

Quotations from the Ottoman documents for the village of Radinovo from the 15th to 17th centuries:

Filibe, village Radin Ova Gereban...[in the village] there are 23 homes, [and all] are Christian.

— Ottoman register from 1472

Village Randeva, in Filibe. Houses (infidels, or Christians) - 3. Income - 256[¤].

— Ottoman register from 1477

Filibe. Village Radinova...Timar of Murad, son of Senkur, serasker of vilaeta, and of Halil. They possess it and participate in the expeditions.

— Ottoman register from 1489

Village Radinova, in Filibe.

— War register from 1495

...Filibe...Village Radinova. Infidel (Christian) houses-45. Widows-6. Income-4300[¤]

— Abridged register of the entire Ottoman Empire from 1530

== Commemorative Plaque ==
A historical point of interest in the village is the commemorative plaque from 1981, in honor of 1,300 years from the founding of Bulgaria. On the plaque, the names of the local soldiers who died in the Balkan Wars in 1912–13, the First World War in 1914–1918, and the Second World War from 1944 to 1945.

== Economy ==
Several plants are located close to the village.
