= Voisil =

Voisil Войсил
- Village
- Location in Bulgaria
- Coordinates: 42°13′N 24°38′E
- Country: Bulgaria
- Province: Plovdiv
- Municipality: Maritsa

Government
  - Mayor: Yako Vidolov (UDF, DSB, UDF)

Area
  - Total: 18.191 km^{2} (7.024 sq mi)
- Elevation: 184 m (604 ft)

Population (2015)
  - Total: 1,028
- Postal code: 4203
- Area code: 0318
- Vehicle registration: РВ

Voisil or Voysil (Bulgarian: Войсил) is a village in Maritsa Municipality, Plovdiv Province, southern Bulgaria. As of 2006 the village has 981 inhabitants.
