= Dinker =

Dinker may refer to:

- Dinker, a player of pickleball that excels at dinking
- Dinker Belle Rai, an Indian American vascular surgeon
- Dinker-Irvin House, an historic house in Bethany Beach, Delaware.
