= Voyvodinovo =

Coordinates: 42°12′N 24°48′E

Voyvodinovo (Bulgarian: Войводиново) is a village in the Plovdiv Province, southern Bulgaria. As of 2006 it has 2,018 inhabitants. It is one of the biggest villages in the Maritsa Municipality and is at 2 km to the east of Plovdiv. There are mineral waters in the village.

== Еconomy ==
Due to its proximity to the second largest city in the country, the Trakiya motorway and the well-organised transport, Voyvodinovo attracts many investitors to build manufacturing plants here. Currently the total amount of the investments exceeds €70 000 000.

The biggest investment is €30,000,000 for the largest electronics plant in the Balkans which was constructed in 2005 and produces microelectronics, DVDs and computers. The plant employs around 300 people.

A new modern €5,500,000 processing plant for pork and beef was inaugurated in May 2007. The facility has a built-up area of 5,900 m²; a capacity of 30,000 tons meat a year and has 150 employees. The production is going to meet the demands of meat-producing companies in the area.

Several other plants are located in the village, mainly in the machine and food industries. There is a project for a golf course.
