= 1928 Chirpan–Plovdiv earthquakes =

Earthquakes in Bulgaria

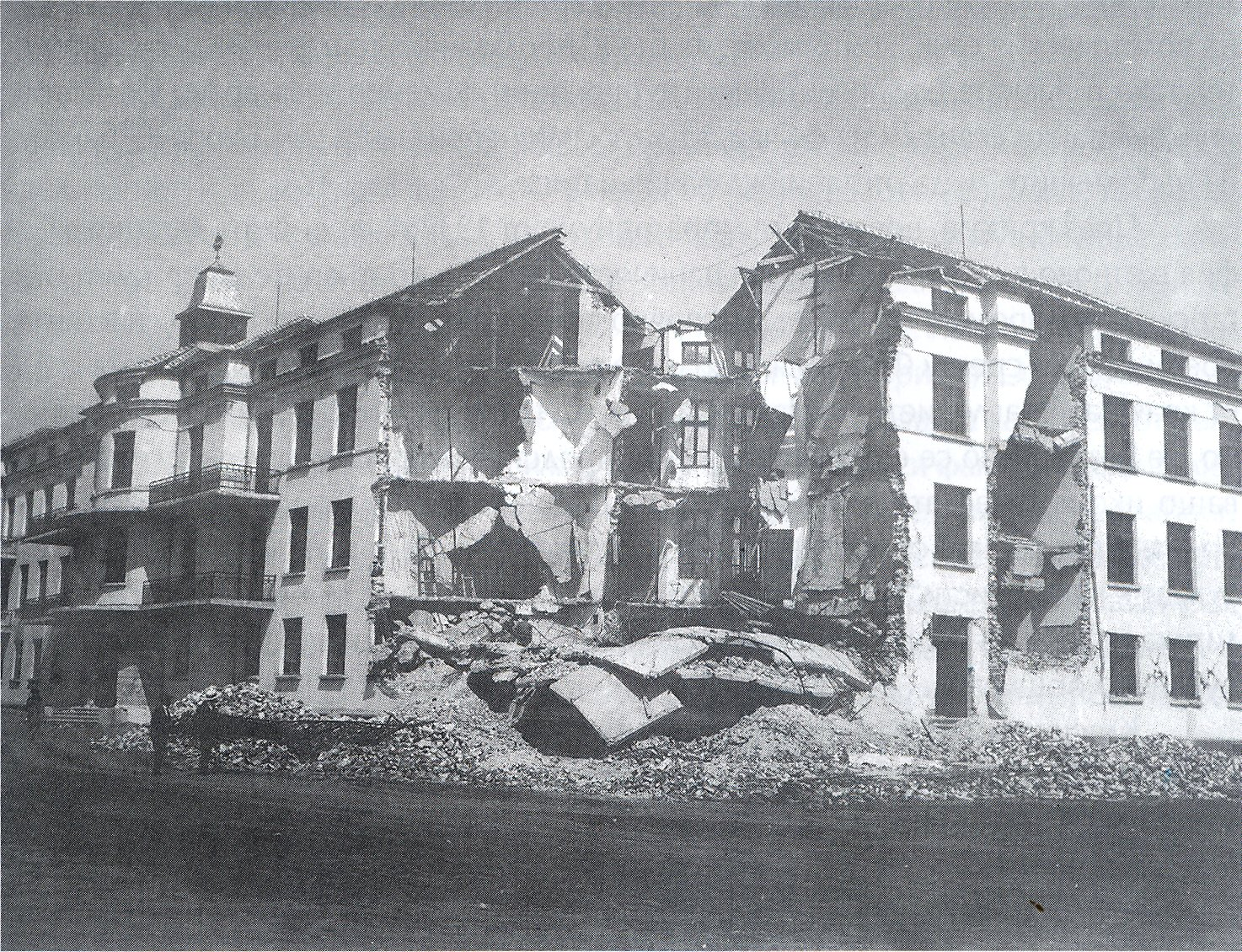
- Damaged hospital in Plovdiv after the earthquake.
- UTC time
- 1928-04-14 09:00:00
- 1928-04-18 19:22:56
- ISC event: 908596
- 908608
- USGS-ANSS: ComCat
- ComCat
- Magnitude
- 7.1 M_{w}
- 7.1 M_{w}
- Depth: 15 km (9 mi)
- Type: Normal
- Areas affected: Bulgaria
- Total damage: Five billion leva; 74,000+ buildings damaged or destroyed
- Max. intensity: MMI XI (Extreme)
- Casualties: 127+ dead

The 1928 Chirpan–Plovdiv earthquakes struck central Bulgaria, south of Sredna Gora on April 14 and 18, respectively. The two largest earthquakes both had moment magnitudes of 7.1 (M_{w}). Major damage was reported, with over 70,000 buildings collapsing. An estimated 127 people died in both earthquakes and many thousands were affected in its aftermath. The two earthquakes were also felt in Greece, where they caused significant damage. The cost of damage totaled 5 billion leva.

== Earthquake ==
The earthquake pair involved a rupture of two separate faults. The first shock ruptured a 36 km (22 mi) long and 10 km (6.2 mi) wide, south-dipping and east–west striking normal fault which slipped 0.7 metres (2 ft 4 in). Older reports, on the other hand, stated a rupture length of 40 to 50 km (25 to 31 mi). A 2002 research revealed that the young fault was active during the Pleistocene epoch, and well into the Holocene. Three colluvial wedges were found along the hanging wall suggesting three prehistoric earthquakes have occurred and caused surface ruptures. Using the dates of the events, an average recurrence interval of 2350 ± 643 years was presented for earthquakes comparable to the 1928 earthquake.

Meanwhile, the second earthquake was caused by the rupture of ten fault structures. This fault is 31 km (19 mi) long, by 10 to 14 km (6.2 to 8.7 mi). it dips steeply to the northeast and becomes shallower at depth. Surface slippage suggests values between 0.3 and 2.6 metres (1 ft 0 in and 8 ft 6 in), and at depth, 2.5 m (8 ft 2 in). A small dextral component was also observed. Coulomb stress transfer after the April 14th earthquake is thought to have triggered the second event.

== Impact ==
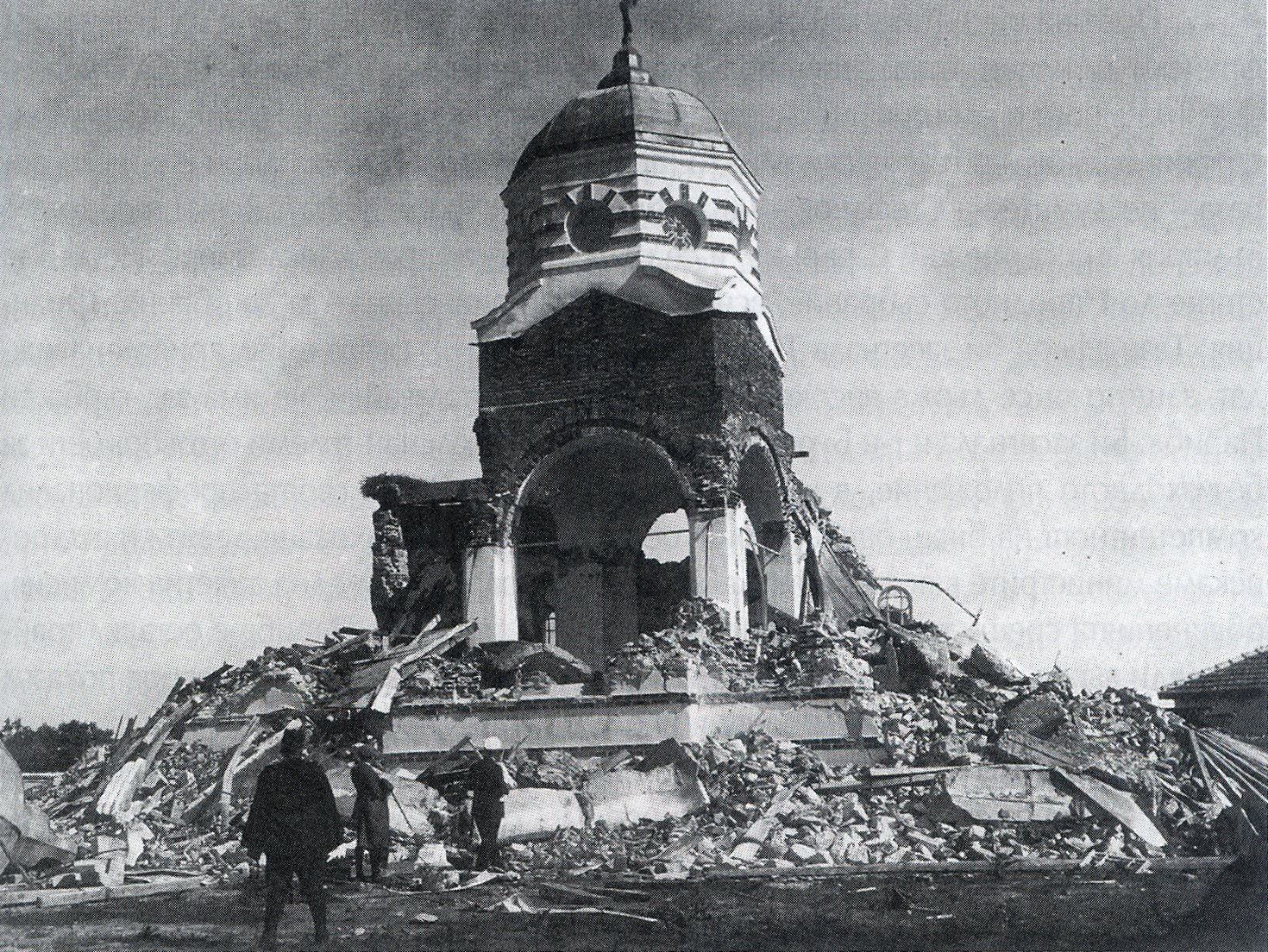
The partially collapsed ruins of the Church of the Holy Savior in Voyvodinovo, near Parvomay.

Both earthquakes achieved a maximum intensity of IX–X on the Medvedev–Sponheuer–Karnik scale and X–XI on the Mercalli intensity scale, causing major damage to the surrounding towns and villages. At least 74,570 buildings were obliterated while another 21,000 left partially destroyed in 240 towns and villages. Nearly every building in Chirpan and Parvomay collapsed as a result of the two earthquakes. The extreme shaking also bent and snapped railway tracks. Over 264,000 residents in the affected area became homeless when their homes were damaged. Many of the survivors slept outside their homes for fear that more aftershocks would collapse them. Plovdiv which was severely affected by the earthquake suffered further destruction when the second mainshock struck closer to the city.

Because the first earthquake took place on a Holy Saturday, many residents were outside their houses thus were not injured or killed when they collapsed. An estimated 402 schools were destroyed but since it was a holiday, there were few deaths.

In Thessaloniki, Greece, the earthquakes caused panic among residents and there was some light damage to the walls of houses. The shaking collapsed a house in Komotini and caused large cracks to appear in the walls of buildings. Two additional homes collapsed in another Greek town while in Eleftheroupoli, a police station collapsed.

== Response ==
Tsar Boris III of Bulgaria was in Vrana Palace at the time of the disaster and he personally travelled to Chirpan and Plovdiv where he led a rescue mission to provide humanitarian aid to victims. The National Assembly of Bulgaria created the Directorate for Assistance and Reconstruction of the Earthquake Region (DIPOSE), which supported injured victims of the two earthquakes and financing construction of buildings. The directorate's purpose was not only to respond to the immediate damage, but also develop scientific understanding of earthquakes. The government spent 100 million leva on repairing damage from the earthquake and alongside 880 million leva from the League of Nations and 60 million leva from international aid, Bulgaria was almost able to repair all damage in only 3 years.

== Gallery ==
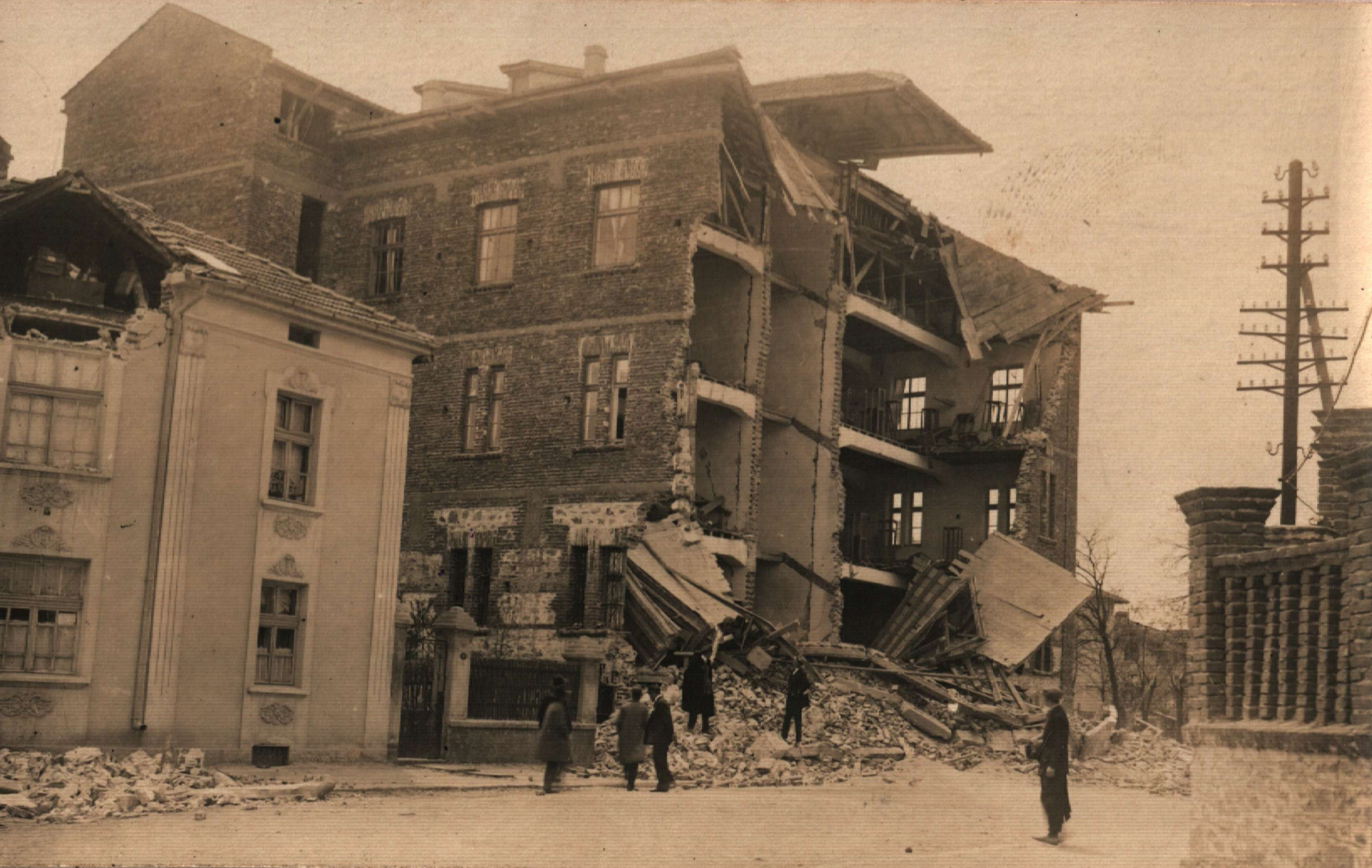

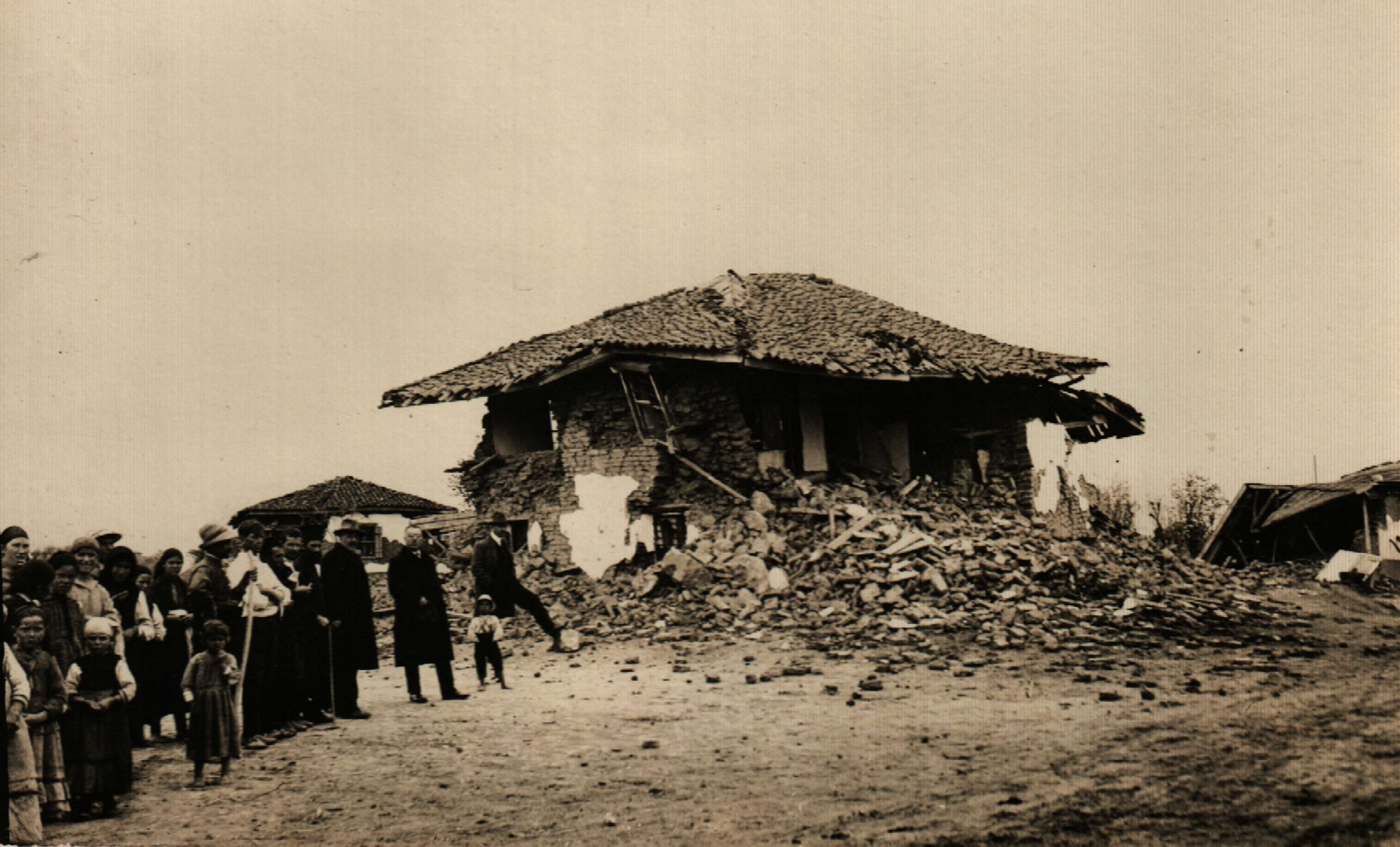

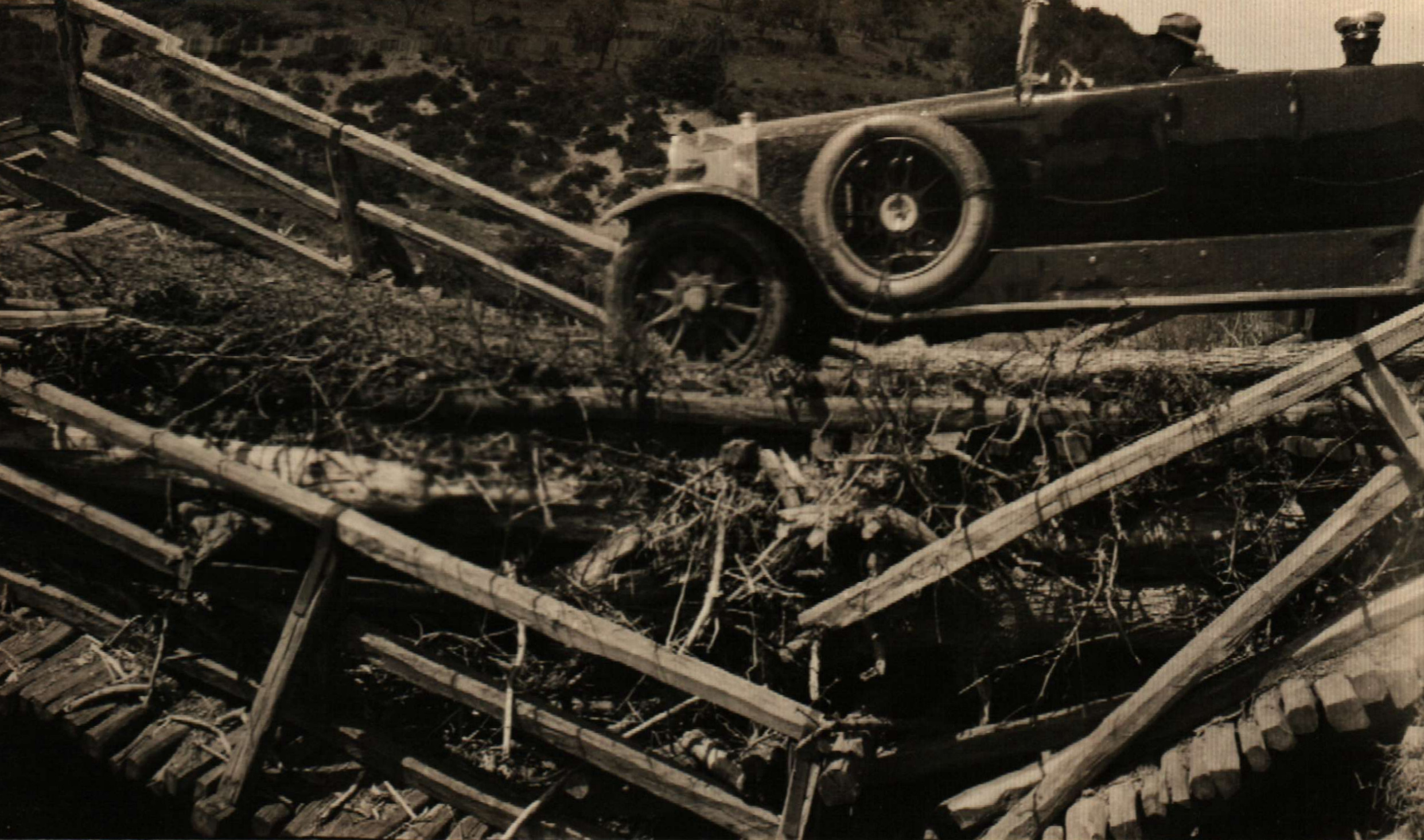
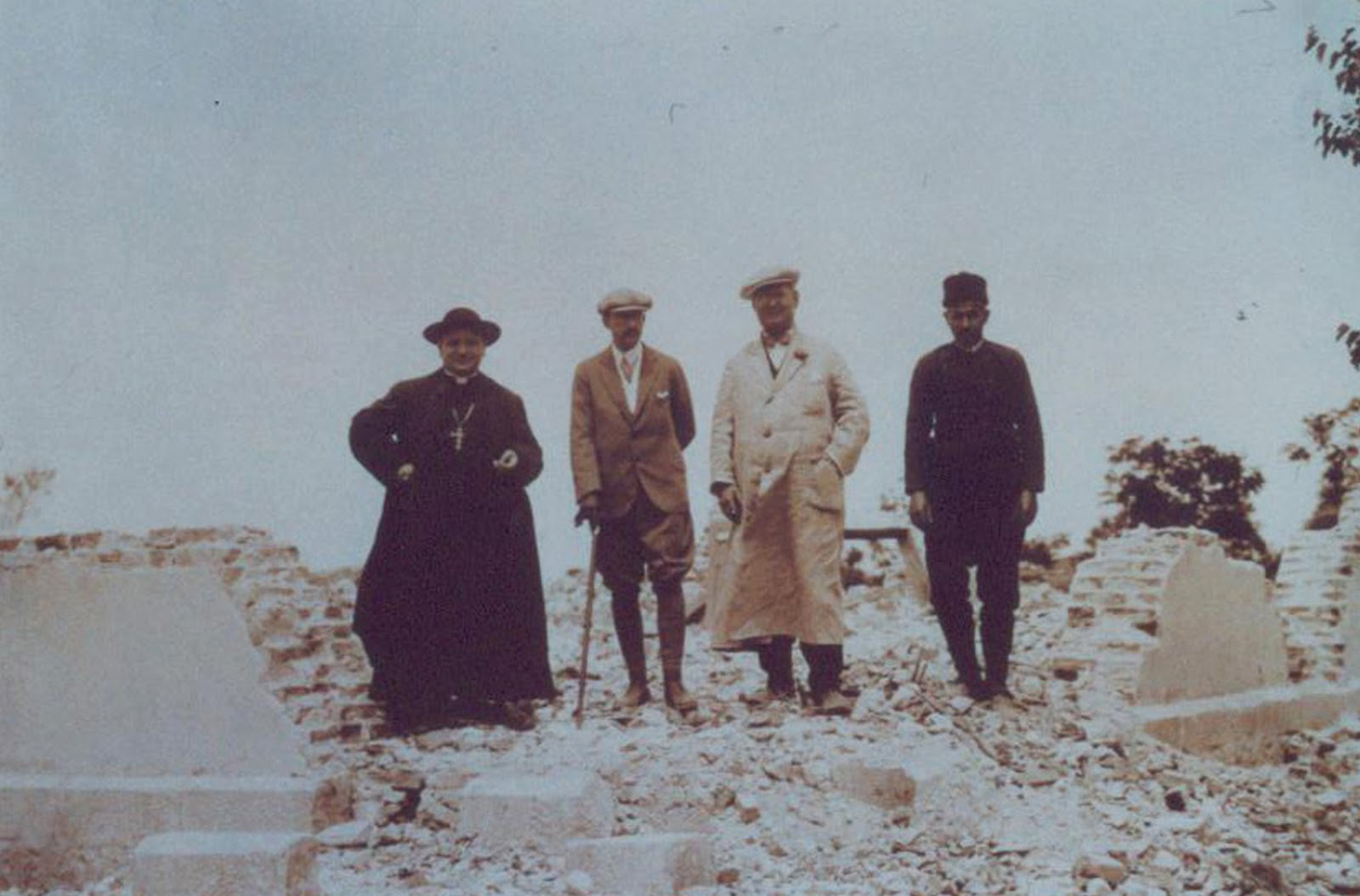
Tsar Boris III of Bulgaria surveying the damage.

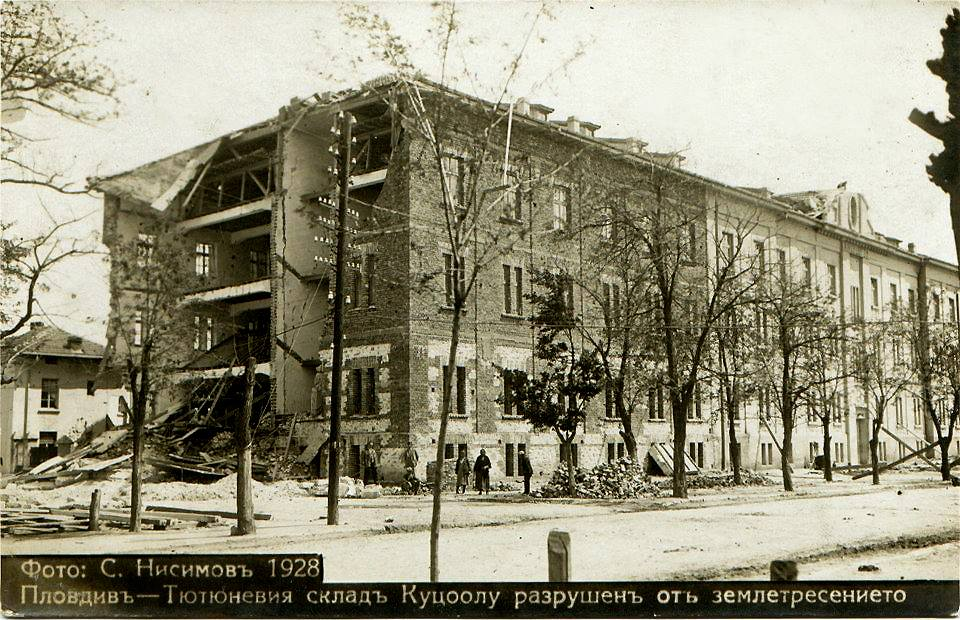
A tobacco warehouse with its sides damaged,

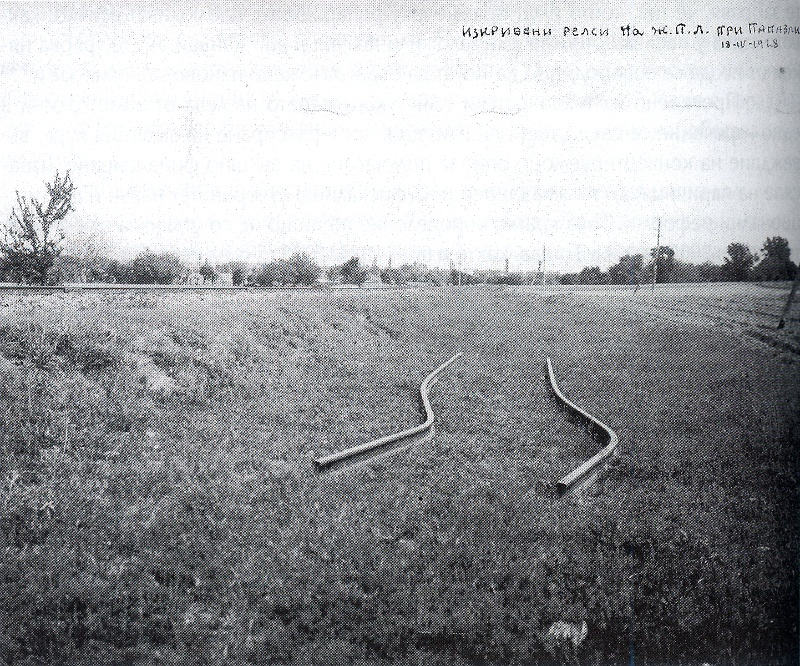
A railway track severely deformed by the earthquake.

== See also ==
- List of earthquakes in 1928
- List of earthquakes in Bulgaria
