= Bryagovo =

Village in Plovdiv, Bulgaria

Coordinates: 41°59′2″N 25°10′36″E

Bryagovo (Bulgarian Брягово) is a village in Parvomay Municipality, Plovdiv Province, Bulgaria. It is to the south of Parvomay town and to the north of Bryagovo Reservoir and the village of Iskra.
