= Karaslavov =

Karaslavov (Bulgarian: Караславов) is a Bulgarian surname. Notable people with the surname include:

- Asen Karaslavov (born 1980), former Bulgarian footballer
- Georgi Karaslavov (1904–1980), Bulgarian writer
- Slav Khristov Karaslavov (1932–2002), Bulgarian writer, journalist and poet
