= St. Cyril and Methodius Community Center =

St. Cyril and Methodius Community Centre, built in 1894, serves Bulgaria's Parvomay Municipality.

== History ==
Community centres in Bulgaria begin to appear during the Bulgarian National Revival. On 2 October 1894 Lambri Donchov, the principal of the local school in Parvomay, founded an educational centre with other fellow townspeople. This institution was the first of its kind in the local area. The established centre was called Budilnik and was responsible for people's general education, the opening of Sunday schools, and events such as public readings. Lambri Donchov was chosen as a chairman. Other townsmen such as Rusi Sirakov, Stefan Ganev, Nikola Popov, dr. Petar Stefanov, Marko Bozhkov, Ganyo Atanasov, and Petar Papazov worked alongside him. On October 4 that same year, a library was opened as a part of the centre.

In 1895, the community centre started to present their first theatrical productions. There was also a choir and a theatrical group. Quickly, it became a driving force for the community of Parvomay (then Borissovgrad) and the local area.

WWI had a negative impact on the community centre's activities, as both the board of trustees and the regular visitors were fighting on the frontline. After the war was over, there was a significant growth. A singing club, Slavey, was founded, as well as several sports organizations and even more theatrical groups and choirs. In 1928, a new theatre stage was created, and five years later, a piano was bought. In 1934, a cinema opened in the community centre and the first musical group in town was formed. In 1931, a local community centre union also emerged. During this period the institution was responsible for hosting events of touring artists in which locals were able to get to know performing arts such as operetta.

In 1969, the institution was awarded a first class order St. Cyril and Methodius. It was categorised as exemplary. During this time, there was an actively performing theatrical group, singing group, mixed choir, Russian music group, folklore choir, illusionist group, and children's music group.

== Modern era ==
Since 1972, the community centre hosts annual celebrations in May, which last one week. Other celebrations such as Wine's Day, Day of the Thracian folklore music, Christmas and New year's are also marked.

There are also two national awards given by the institution. They're named after Georgi Karaslavov, for prose, and Slav Hr. Karaslavov, for poetry. There are also two halls used for literature-related events, such as award ceremonies and readings. The institution is partnering with all the schools and kindergartens in the municipality of Parvomay.

There are also permanent exhibitions of photographs showing the three periods in the development of Parvomay, as well as posters, historical artefacts, and awards. Most of the community centre's halls are used as galleries. Both local and guest artists showcase their works throughout the year. There are also paintings of Yoan Leviev, Nikola Manev, and Vihra Grigorova.

The theatre hall has a capacity of 500 seats; both local and guest performers play there.

Since 2002, the St. Cyril and St. Methodius community centre holds the honorary sign of Parvomay.

Currently there are several groups performing as part of the community centre, including:

- Parvomay folklore ensemble
- Dance group Evridika
- Russian music group Ivushka
- Theatrical group Dimitar Delchev
