= Arapovo Monastery =

Coordinates: 42°0′52″N 24°59′39″E

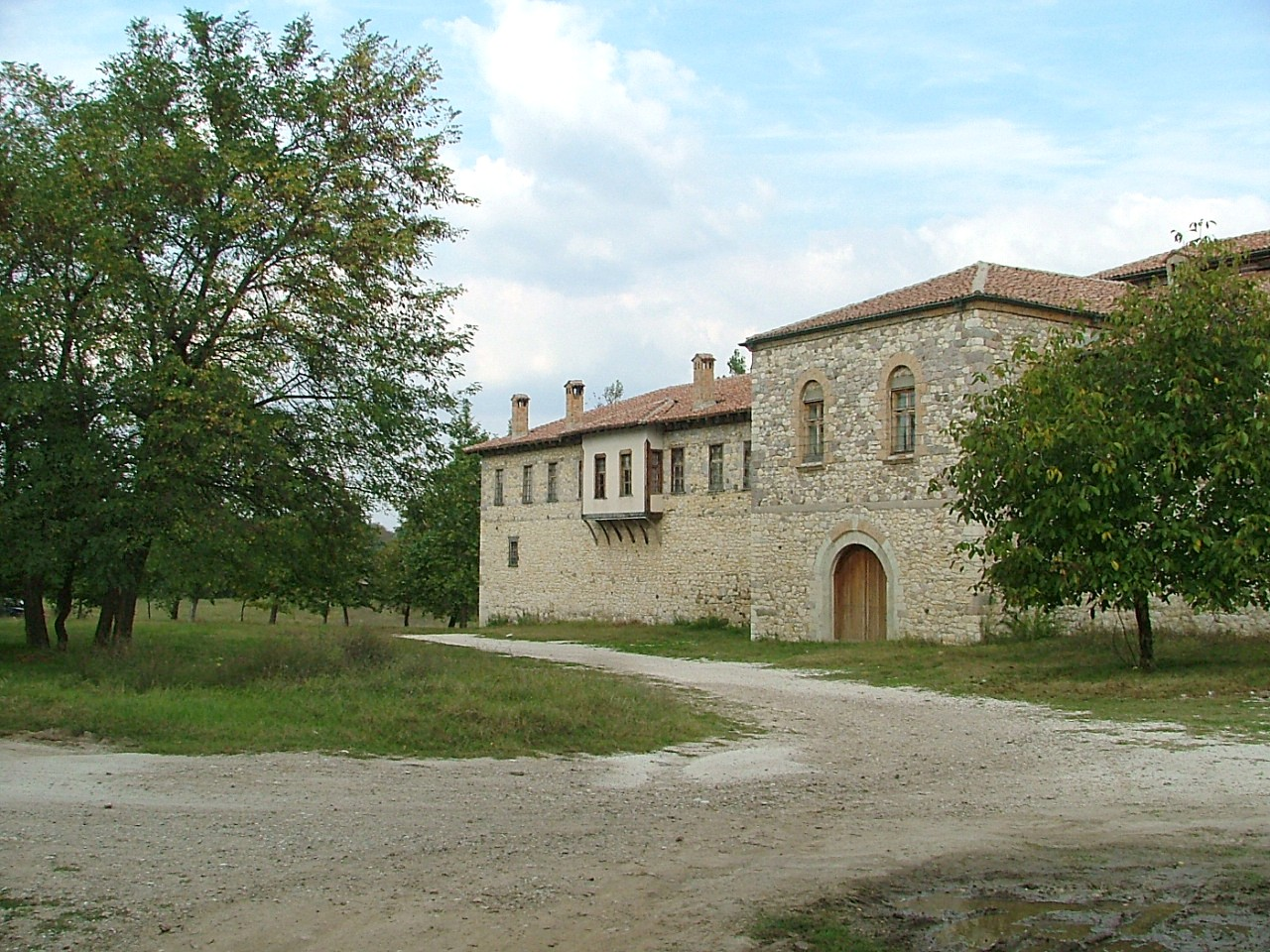
Arapovo Monastery

The Arapovo Monastery of Saint Nedelya (Bulgarian: Араповски манастир „Света Неделя“, Arapovski manastir „Sveta Nedelya“) is a Bulgarian Orthodox monastery lying some six kilometres east of the town of Asenovgrad in Asenovgrad Municipality, Plovdiv Province of central southern Bulgaria. Founded in the mid-19th century, it belongs to the Plovdiv eparchy of the Bulgarian Orthodox Church and was named after the nearby village of Arapovo, today known as Zlatovrah.

Construction of the monastery began around 1856 and was initiated by the hieromonk Sophronius. The location was selected due to the presence of a holy spring nearby. The monastical school was founded in 1859, the same year the monastery's main church was completed. Architecturally, the Arapovo Monastery bears a strong resemblance to the Gorni Voden Monastery; the architect who headed the construction was master Stoyu from Yugovo. The main painter was Vasil Levski's associate Georgi Danchov, who was assisted by Aleksi Atanasov.

The monastery's main church, dedicated to Saint Nedelya, is a large three-naved, three-apsed and cross-domed church. Another feature of the monastery is the sizable stone tower in its inner yard. The rectangular tower has been linked to the famous hajduk leader Angel Voyvoda who is known to have been a ktitor of the monastery. The tower has three storeys. The lower two were constructed entirely of stone and feature narrow windows intended for defensive purposes, while the top storey is a wooden bay-windowed construction with four rooms designed for habitation.

== Gallery ==
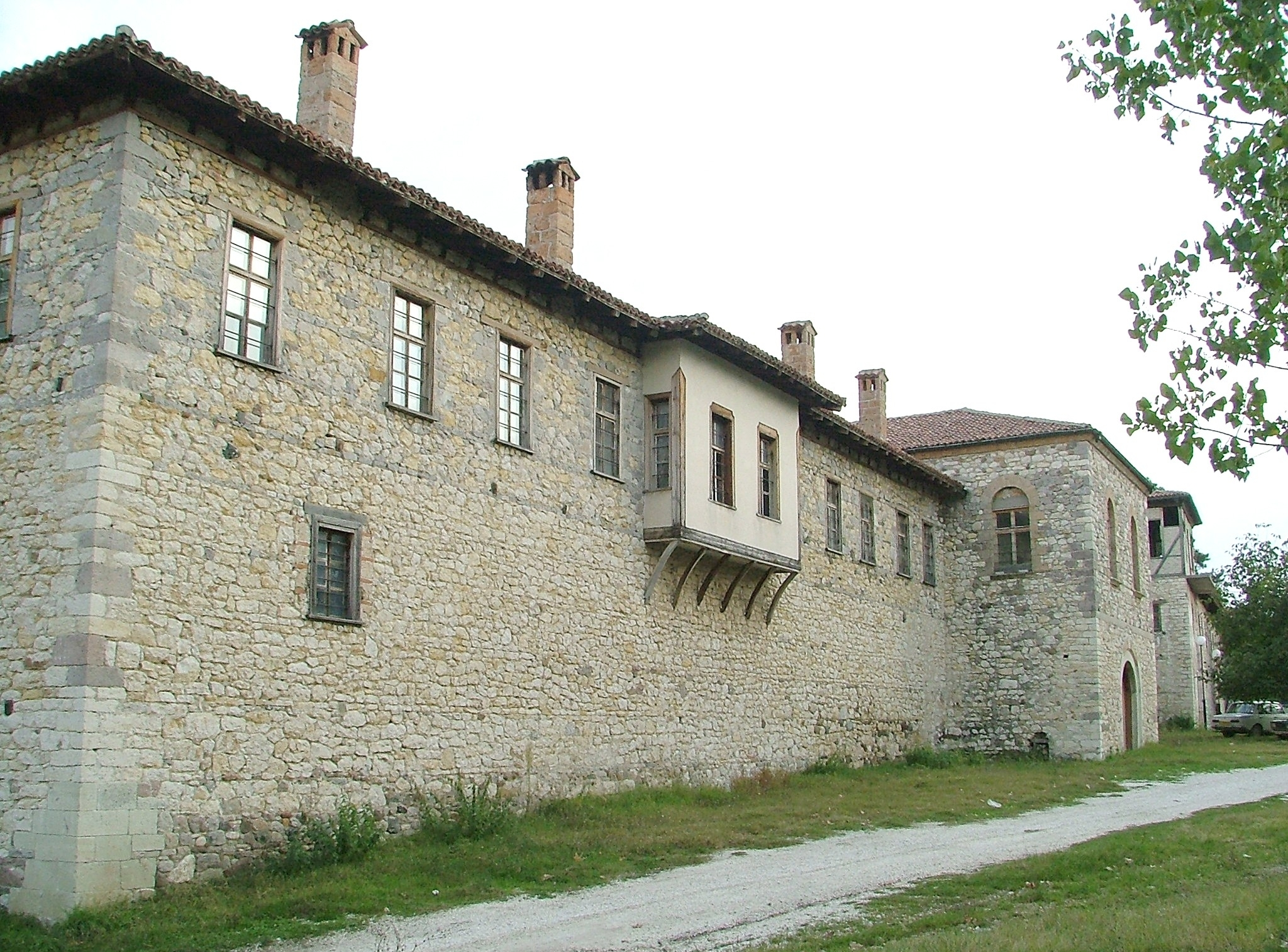
Exterior of the Arapovo Monastery

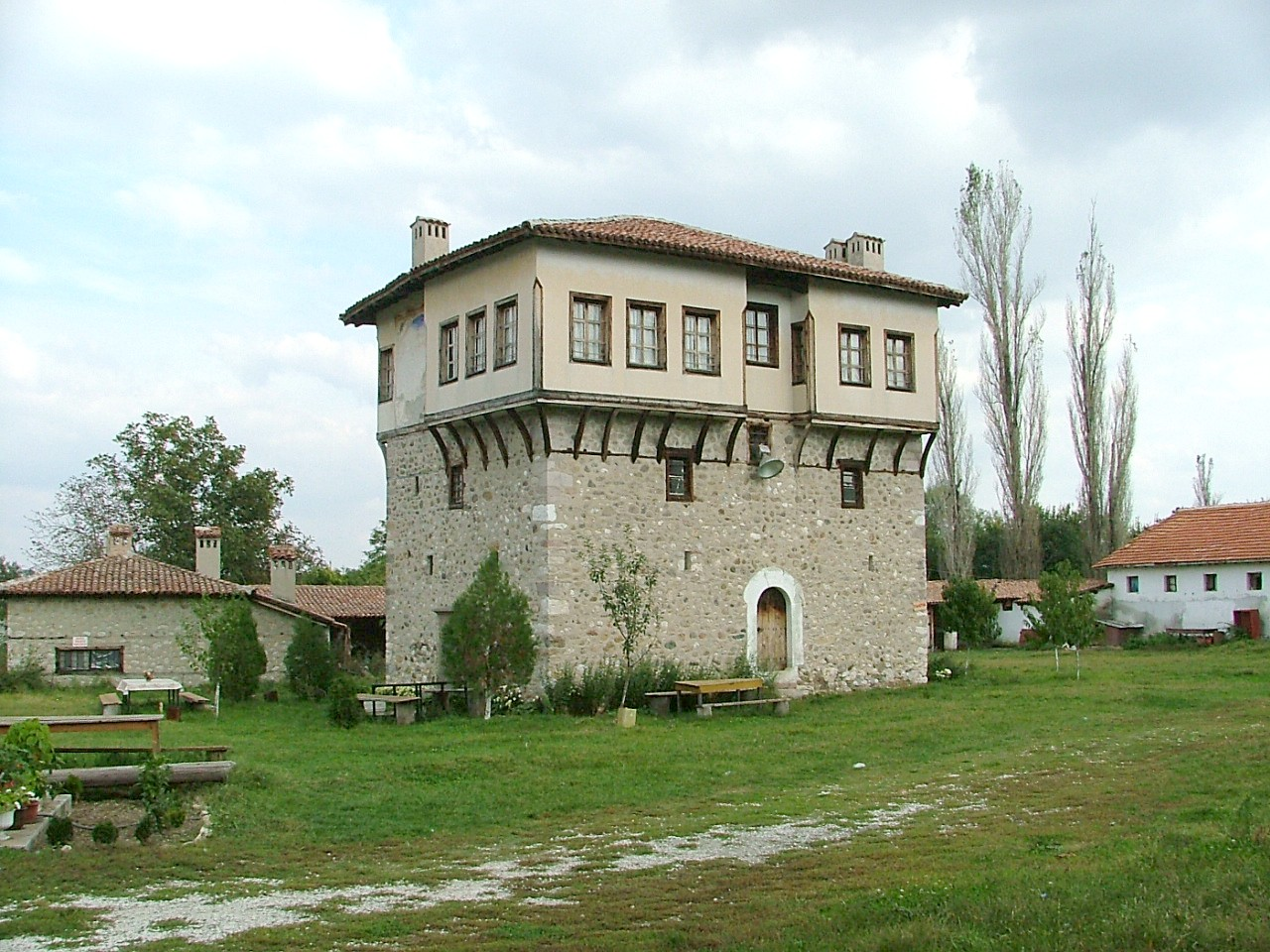
Angel Voyvoda's Tower

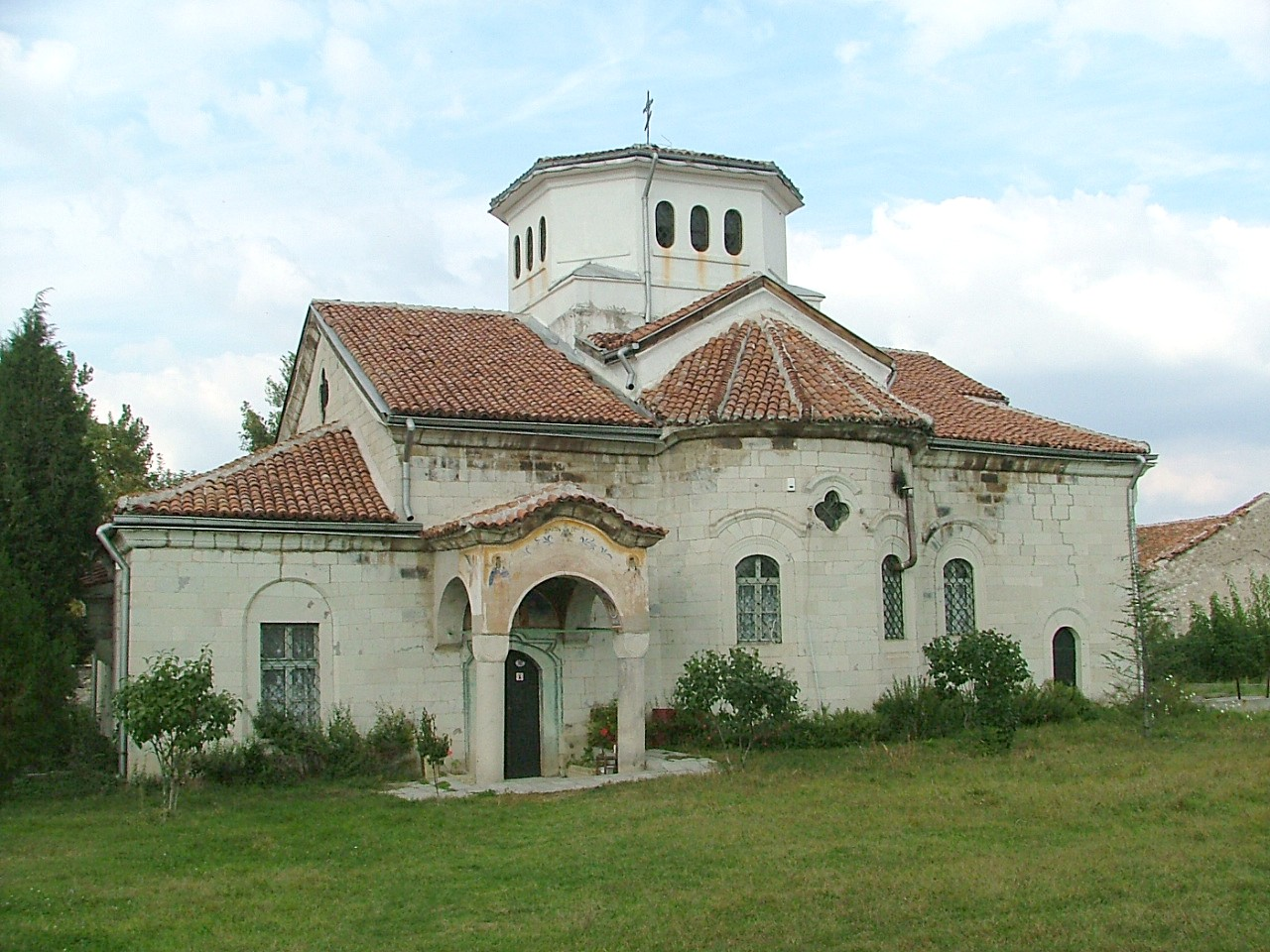
Main church

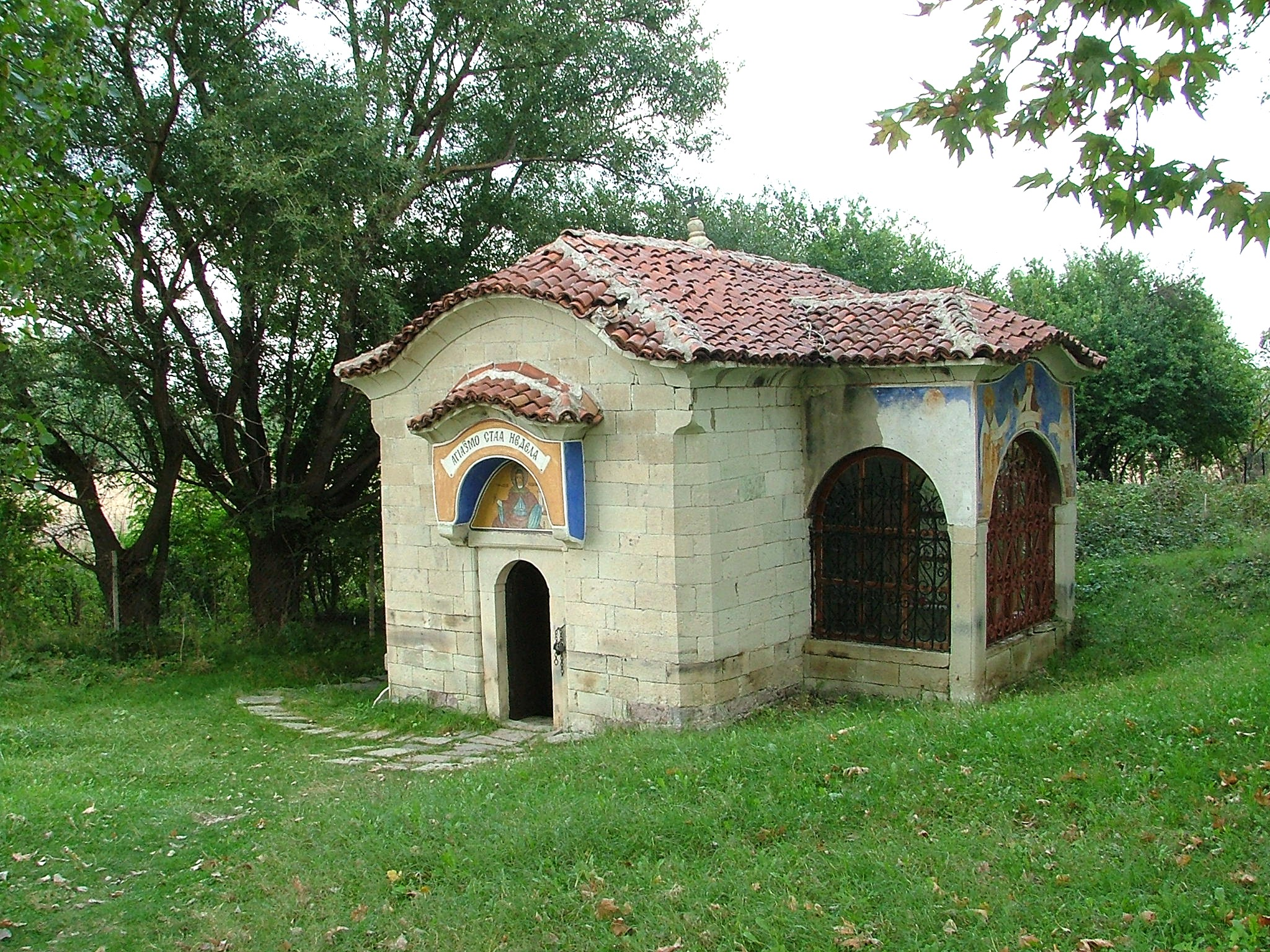
Holy spring chapel

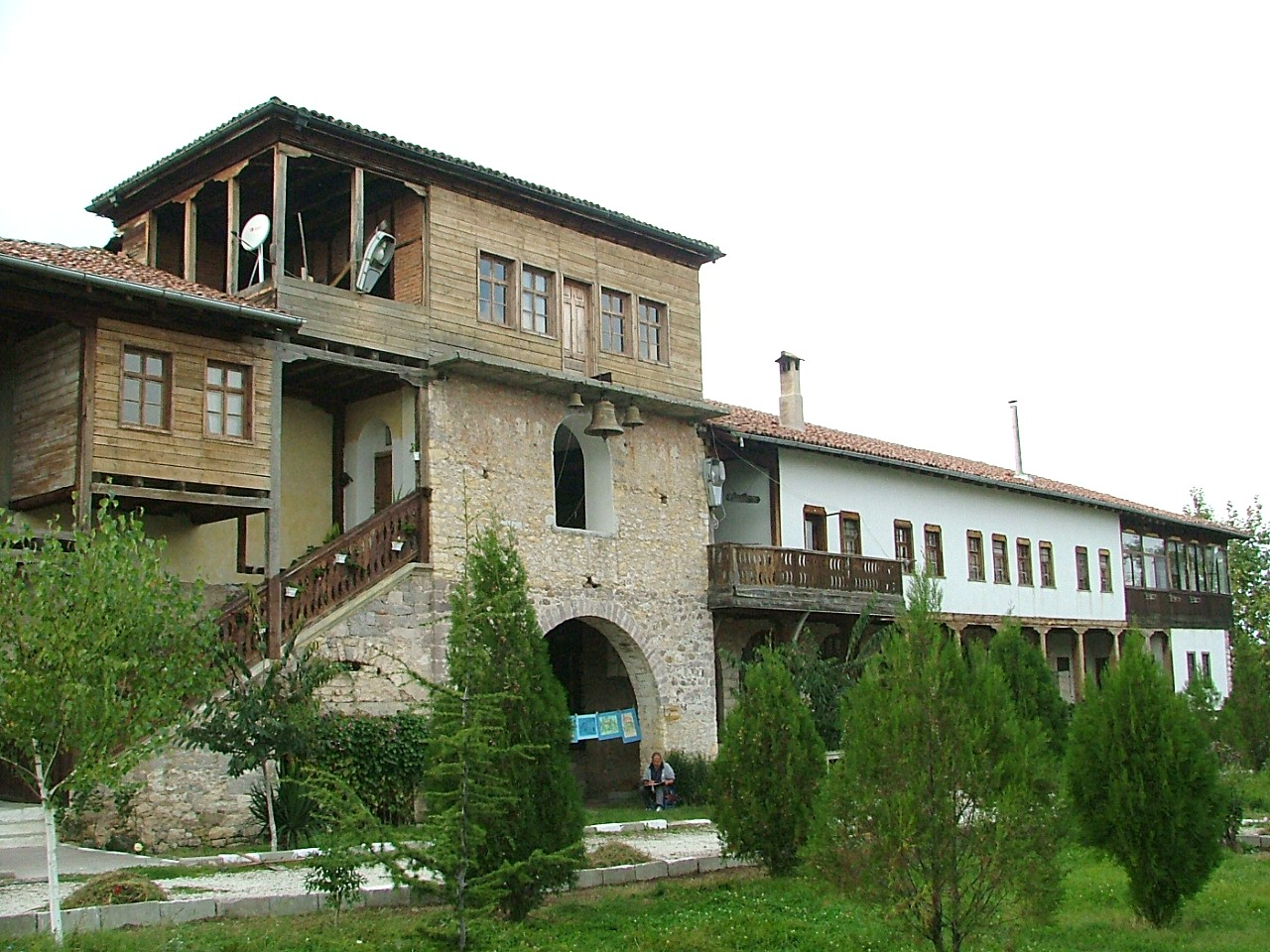
View from the inner yard
