= Vinitsa, Plovdiv Province =

Vinitsa Виница
- Village
- Location within Bulgaria
- Coordinates: 42.133333°N 25.133333°E
- Country: Bulgaria
- Province: Plovdiv Province
- Municipality: Parvomay Municipality

Area
  - Total: 14.763 km^{2} (5.700 sq mi)

Population
  - Total: 1,273
  - Density: 86.2/km^{2} (223/sq mi)
- Postal code: 4284
- Area code: 031603

Vinitsa (Bulgarian: Виница) is a village in southern Bulgaria, located in Parvomay Municipality, Plovdiv Province. As of the 2020 June Bulgaria Census, the village has a population count of 1273.

== Geography ==
Vinitsa is located 10 kilometers South West from Parvomay. The Maritsa river flows near the village.

The geographical area, in which it is located - the Upper Thracian Plain, is fertile and enables the inhabitants to cultivate many crops. Near Vinitsa village, an endangered species of swamp snowdrop can be found. Along with Gradina village, this is one of the few places that the endangered plant can be found in Southern Bulgaria. In 1903, the village was renamed from Badarlii to Vinitsa.

=== Infrastructure ===
There is one school in Vinitsa, a primary school named "Vasil Aprilov", which allows students to graduate the 8th grade.

Most children from the village continue their education in the nearby Municipality of Parvomay.

There is a community hall with library in Vinitsa, named after Georgi Sava Rakovski. It was built during 1928.
