= Parvomay =

Parvomay Първомай
- Town
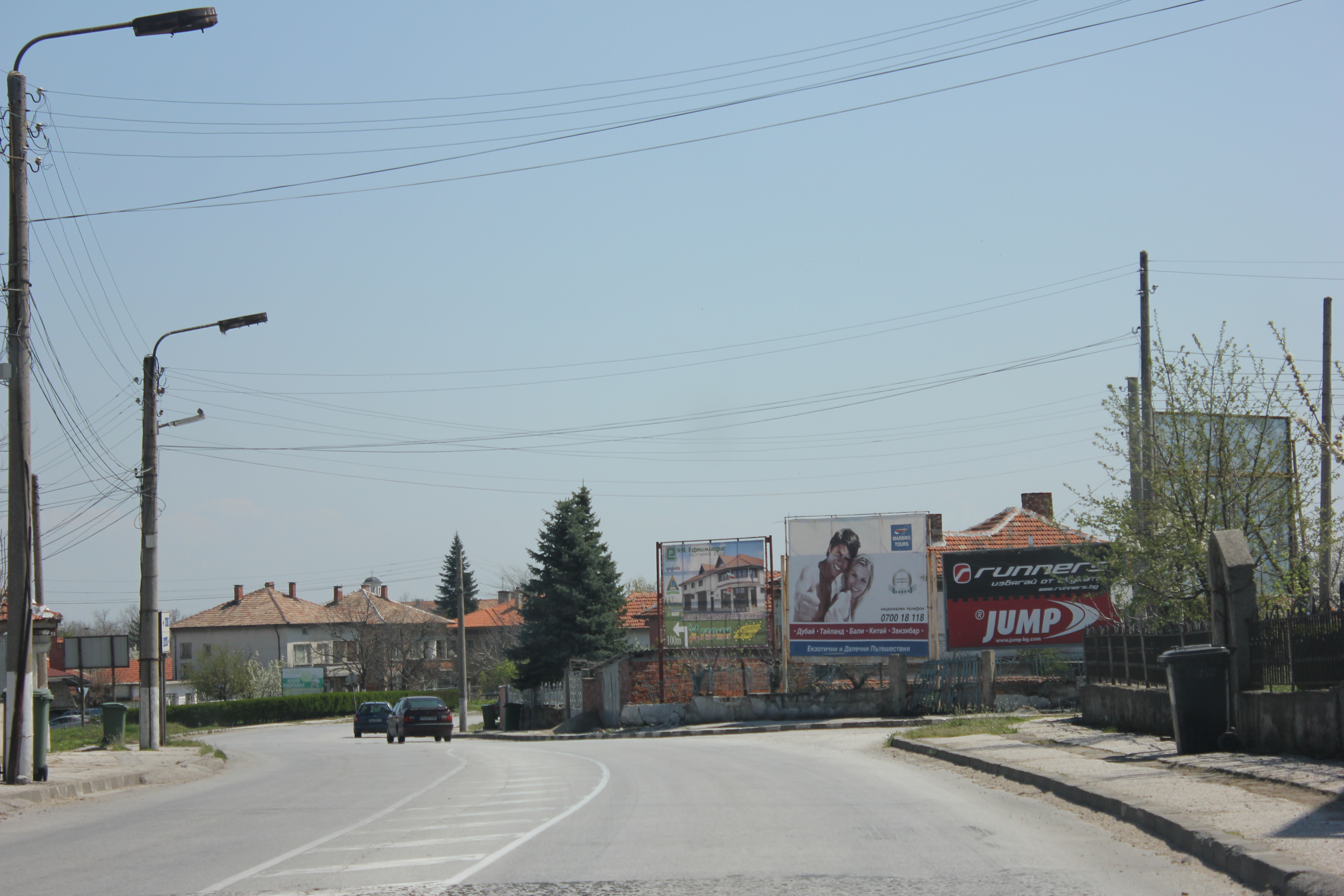
- Main street in Parvomay

- Coat of arms

- Location of Parvomay within Bulgaria
- Coordinates: 42°6′N 25°13′E
- Country: Bulgaria
- Province: Plovdiv

Government
  - Mayor: Nikolay Mitkov

Area
  - Total: 75,485 km^{2} (29,145 sq mi)
- Elevation: 134 m (440 ft)

Population (31st December 2024)
  - Total: 10,973
  - Density: 0.14537/km^{2} (0.37650/sq mi)
- Time zone: UTC+2 (EET)
  - Summer (DST): UTC+3 (EEST)
- Postal code: 4270
- Area code: 0336

Parvomay (Bulgarian: Първомай [pɐrvoˈmaj]) is a town located in the Plovdiv Province of southern Bulgaria, part of the similarly named municipality (Parvomay Municipality). It is geographically close to the towns of Sadovo and Chirpan. The name literally means First of May, i.e., May Day, in English and is sometimes transliterated as Parvomai or Purvomai.

As with many places in Bulgaria, the town has other names, such as its old name (up until 1947) of Borisovgrad (after Bulgaria's last Tsar, Boris to celebrate his birthday on 30 January 1894), as well as Borissograd, Borissovgrade, or Borissowgrad. Until 1894, it was known by its Turkish names of Hadzi Ejles (Bulgarian Хаджи Елес), Hadzi-Ele, Hadzi-Jeiles, Khadzhi Eiles, or Khadzhi-Eles ("Hacı İlyas" in Turkish).

== The town ==
The municipal centre town Parvomay is situated at 134 meters above sea level. The town is 180 km to the east of Sofia, 39 km to the east of Plovdiv city, 50 km to the southwest of Stara Zagora, 34 km to the west of city of Haskovo and 360 km to the northwest of Istanbul, the northern edge of the town is 700m south of the Maritza River.

The topography of the Parvomay Municipality is predominantly a flat plain, except for the fields of the Voden and Bukovo villages and the rolling hills around Iskra, Bryagovo, Dragoinovo, and Ezerovo which are part of the foothills of Dragoyna. The ridge's name comes from a legend about Dragoy, prince of the Slavonic tribe that inhabited the region and his daughter Dragoyna, who built a white stone castle on the peak that the Byzantines later conquered and destroyed. This range is in turn the foothills of the Rhodopi mountains, passing to the South-West into the Novakovski Balkan mountain.

In 1926, it had a population of 4,425 which rose to 5,050 in 1946. By 1985, the population had risen to 17,136; and by 1992, it had dropped to 16,826. By 2009, Parvomay's population had further declined to 16,630 and by the end of 2010, it fell to 13,733. Parvomay was ranked as the 57th largest city of Bulgaria in 2011.

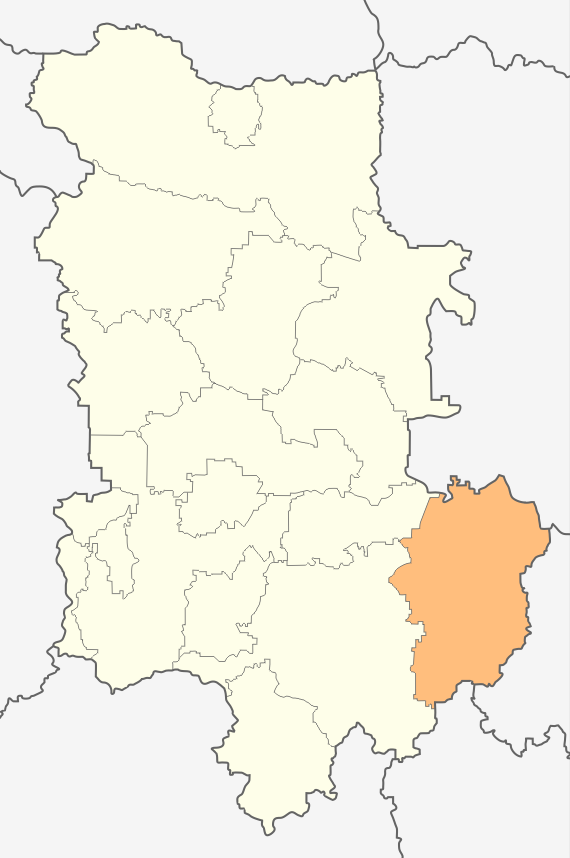
Map of Parvomay municipality (Plovdiv Province)

== The municipality ==
The administrative center of the Parvomay Municipality is the town of Parvomay. It comprises three areas, major urban and two suburbs Debar to the South and Liybenovo to the North East. The municipality is situated in the most Eastern area of the Plovdiv Pazardzhik plain– part of the Upper Thracian lowlands, with a total area of 470,057 decares. The Municipality encompasses 17 settlements with a population of 32,131 people. Villages in Parvomay Municipality in the Plovdiv Province are; Bryagovo (789 inhabitants to 02/05/2006), Bukovo, Byala Reka, Dalbok Izvor, Dobri Do, Dragoynovo, Ezerovo, Gradina, Iskra, Karadjalovo, Vinitsa, Voden. Iskra is the largest in the area with a population of 1829 (to 02/05/2006) in the Dragoyna foothills to the south of Parvomay.

== History ==
Fossils of sea shells have been found in the limestone rocks near the village of Ezerovo (to the southeast of Parvomay town) a full skeleton of a prehistoric Deinotherium was also found in this area which is on display in Asenovgrad Paleontological Museum.

Sometime from the 5th century BC to the 3rd century BC, this area became part of the Thracian Odrysian kingdom. In the quarters of Debar and Liybenovo on the outskirts of Parvomay town, archeologists have found Thracian mounds. By the 1st century AD, this part of Thrace was annexed by the Roman Empire, and later it remained a part of its Eastern Roman Empire. Roman graves dating to the period of the 1st–4th centuries have been also discovered around Parvomay. Throughout the history of Bulgaria, the area has been Thracian, Greek, Roman, Byzantium, Slav, Bulgar and Ottoman.

Archaeological finds in 2004, 2005, and 2006 relate to a Thracian cult complex of a collection of tribes known as the Odrysian kingdom in an area to the south of Dragoynovo at the Goliama Dragoyna peak. The peak of Goliama Dragoyna is the highest point in the area at 813,60 m. A high concentration of Thracian tumulus (burial mounds) have been found in the area. A golden ring was found in Ezerovo, near to Dragoyna archaeological site. The ring has an inscription in Thracian Language with Greek letters. It indicates that the relatives dedicate the ring to the deceased. Numerous dice were also found.

A settlement was located close to the village of Dragoynovo near to Iskra. This religious complex is one of the many sacred places, established by the Thracians on high mountain peaks. Sanctuaries of this type originated and developed as religious centres in the period between the Late Bronze Age and the end of the Roman Empire. The sanctuary complex on Dragoyna peak was first studied and recorded in the first half of the 20th century since when the site has suffered at the hands of numerous treasure hunters. No formal archaeological excavations were conducted until 2004. Two periods of occupation have been identified from the archaeological evidence:

- 13th century BC – 5th century BC: the Late Bronze Age and Early Iron Age, but also the Dark Ages in the Aegean and Anatolia. At this time, the hill had no floral and soil cover. The archaeological finds from the period are fireplaces, which served as altars for various fire-related rituals.
- 4th century BC – 3rd century BC: the Late Iron Age or the period of Classics and Hellenism. In this period, the region of the Eastern Mediterranean had its cultural consolidation provoked by the military campaigns of the Macedonian rulers Philip II and Alexander the Great. This was also the period of the most active utilization of the sanctuary.

Four churches were discovered by archaeological excavations near the village of Iskra.

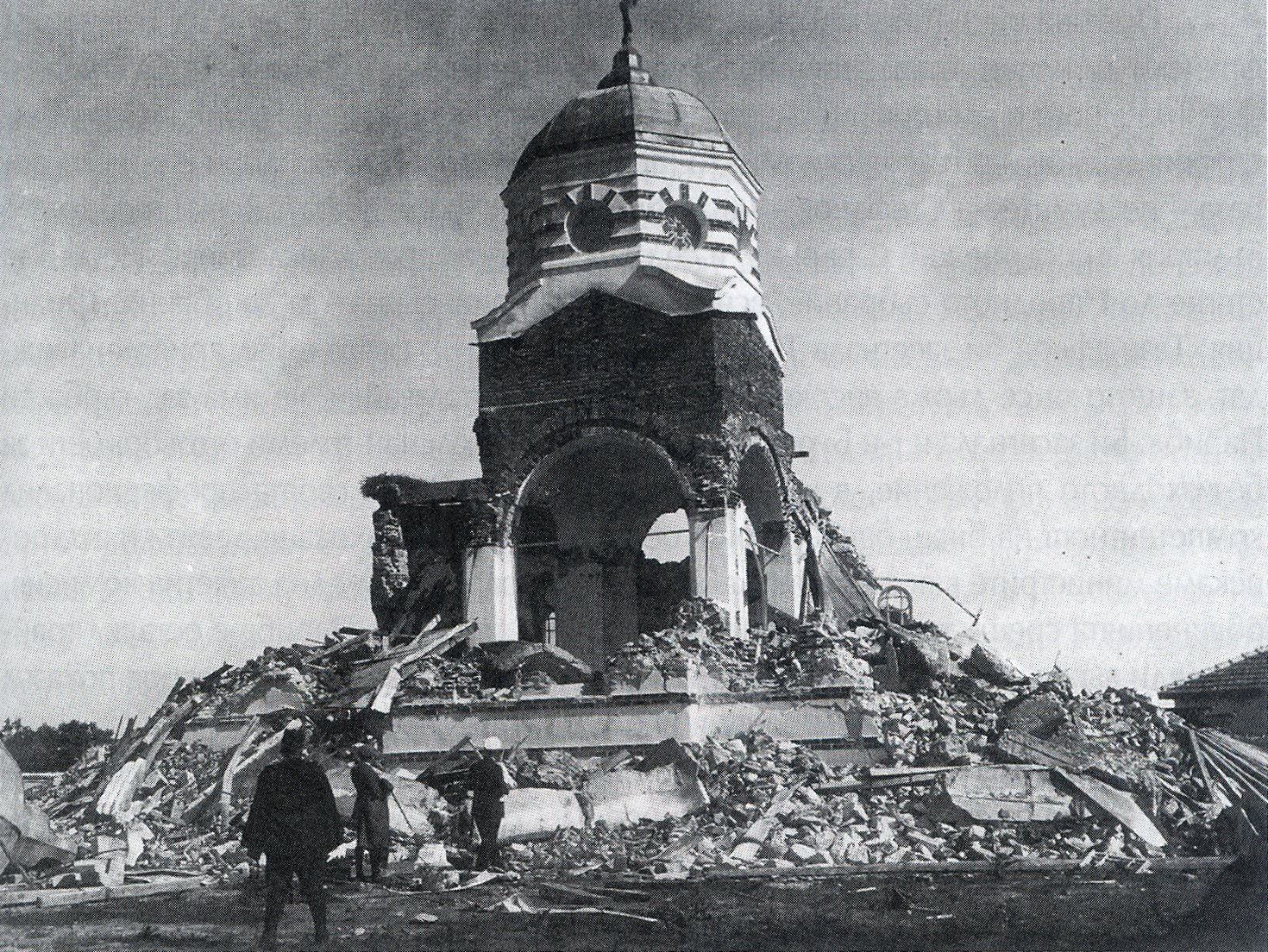
1928 Chirpan–Plovdiv earthquakes – Voyvodinovo

The oldest documented reference to the city of Parvomay is from 1576 in the register of Ottoman taxes in Bulgaria. In 1671, the Turkish travel writer Evliya Celebi mentions the village of Iskra to the south. Parvomay was for a time part of Eastern Rumelia, an autonomous province within the Ottoman Empire after the Treaty of Berlin in 1878. After the revolution of September 6, 1885, the province was annexed by the Principality of Bulgaria. On 14 April 1928, a sequence of two earthquakes with a magnitude of approximately 7 in central Bulgaria destroyed 74,000 buildings and killed 114 people in the nearby cities of Plovdiv, Chirpan (to the north) and Parvomay. A newspaper at the time reported that 1,000 buildings in Parvomay collapsed.

== Civic and educational buildings ==
Parvomay's post office opened in 1881, its first hospital opened with one doctor and 10 hospital beds in 1882, and its first doctors clinic in 1886. Parvomay's hospital is located just to the southwest of the town centre and there is also a sizable medical centre just to the north of the centre. The St. Cyril and Methodius Community Center is located in a parkland in the centre of the Town. Following the 1928 earthquake that destroyed many buildings including the courthouse, a fund was set up to construct a new building. A small building constructed in the centre of Parvomay in 1932 has jurisdiction over Parvomay Municipality.

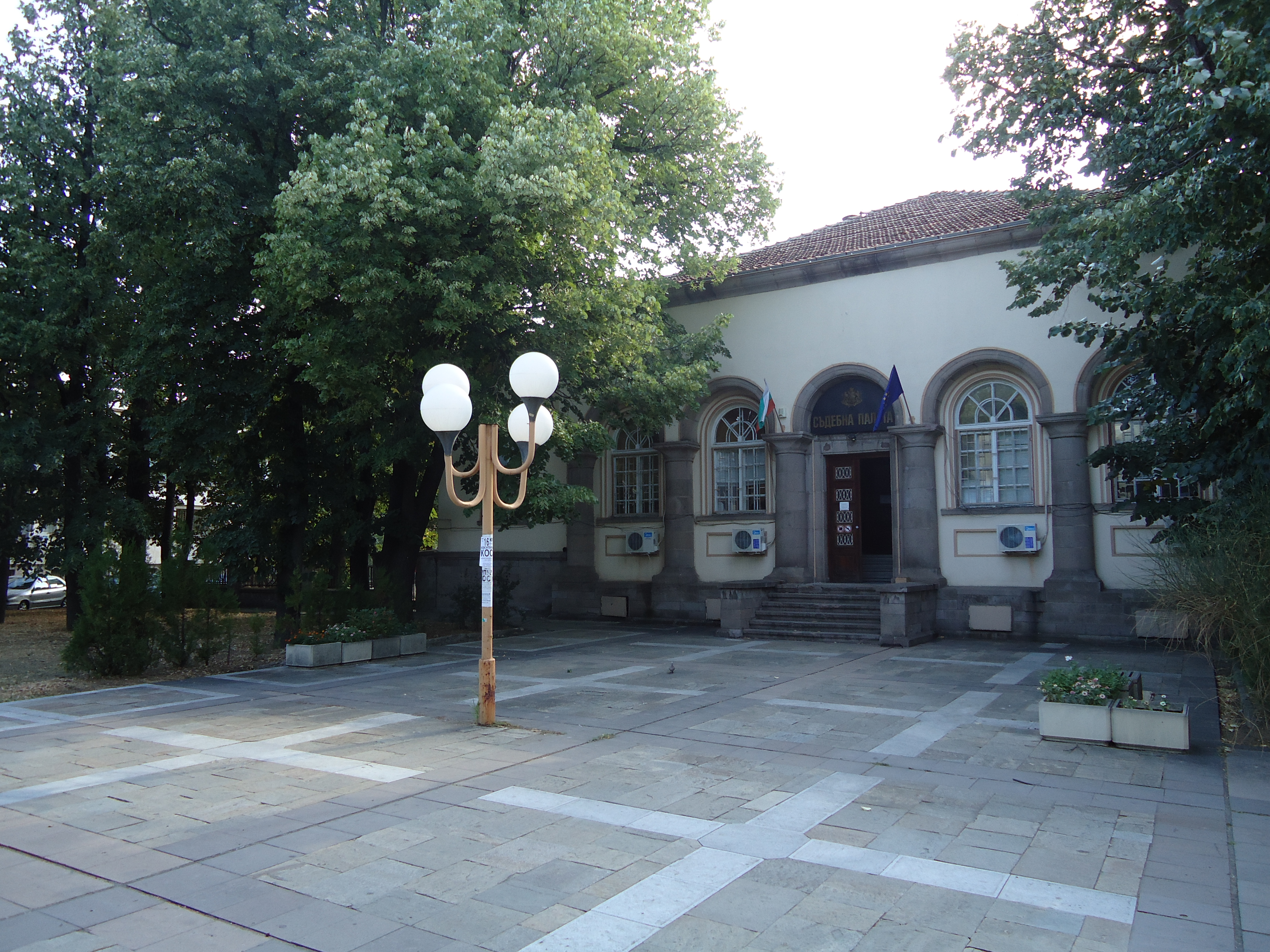
Parvomay's courthouse, built in 1932

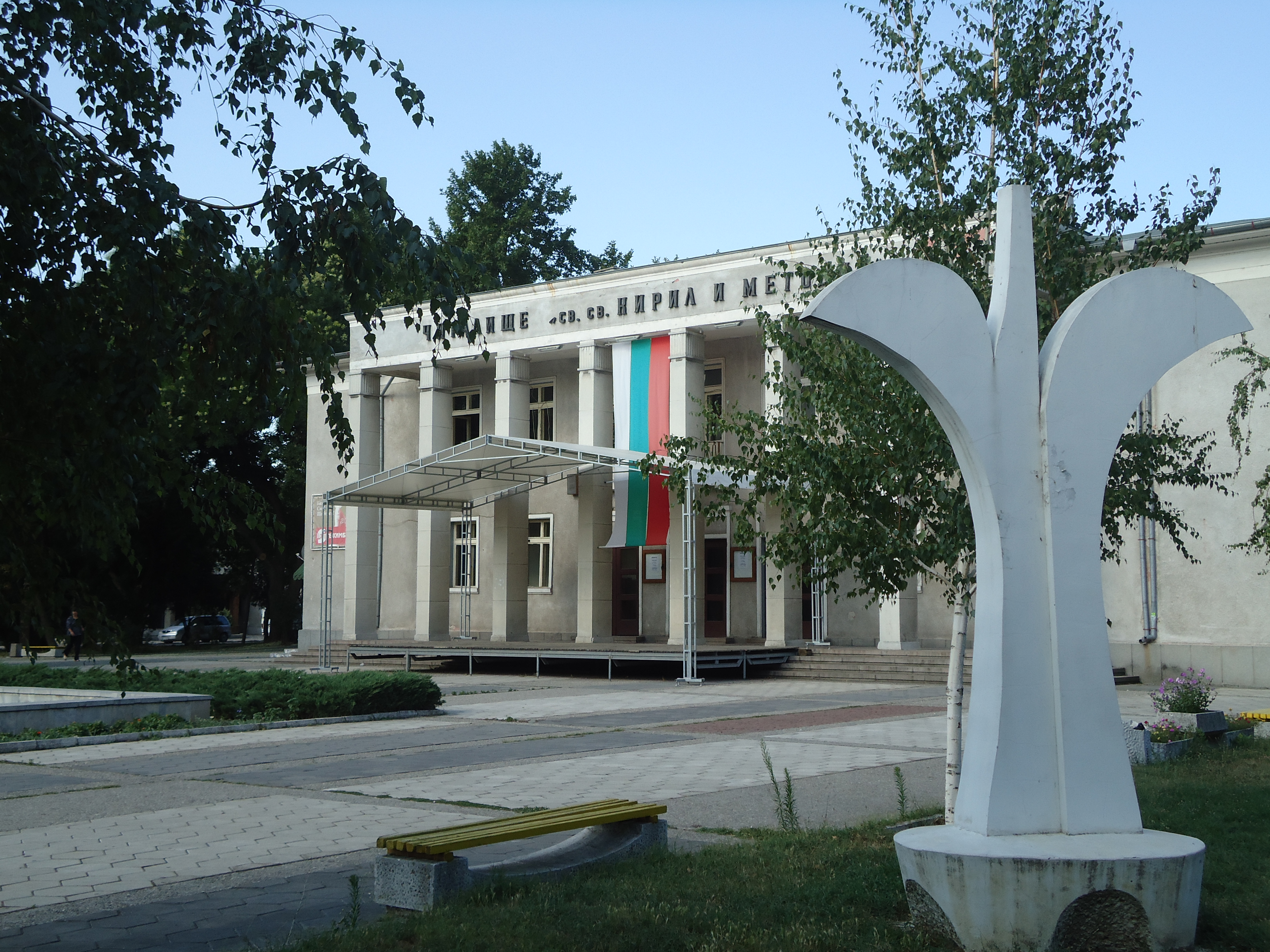
Parvomay Theatre & St. Cyril and Methodius

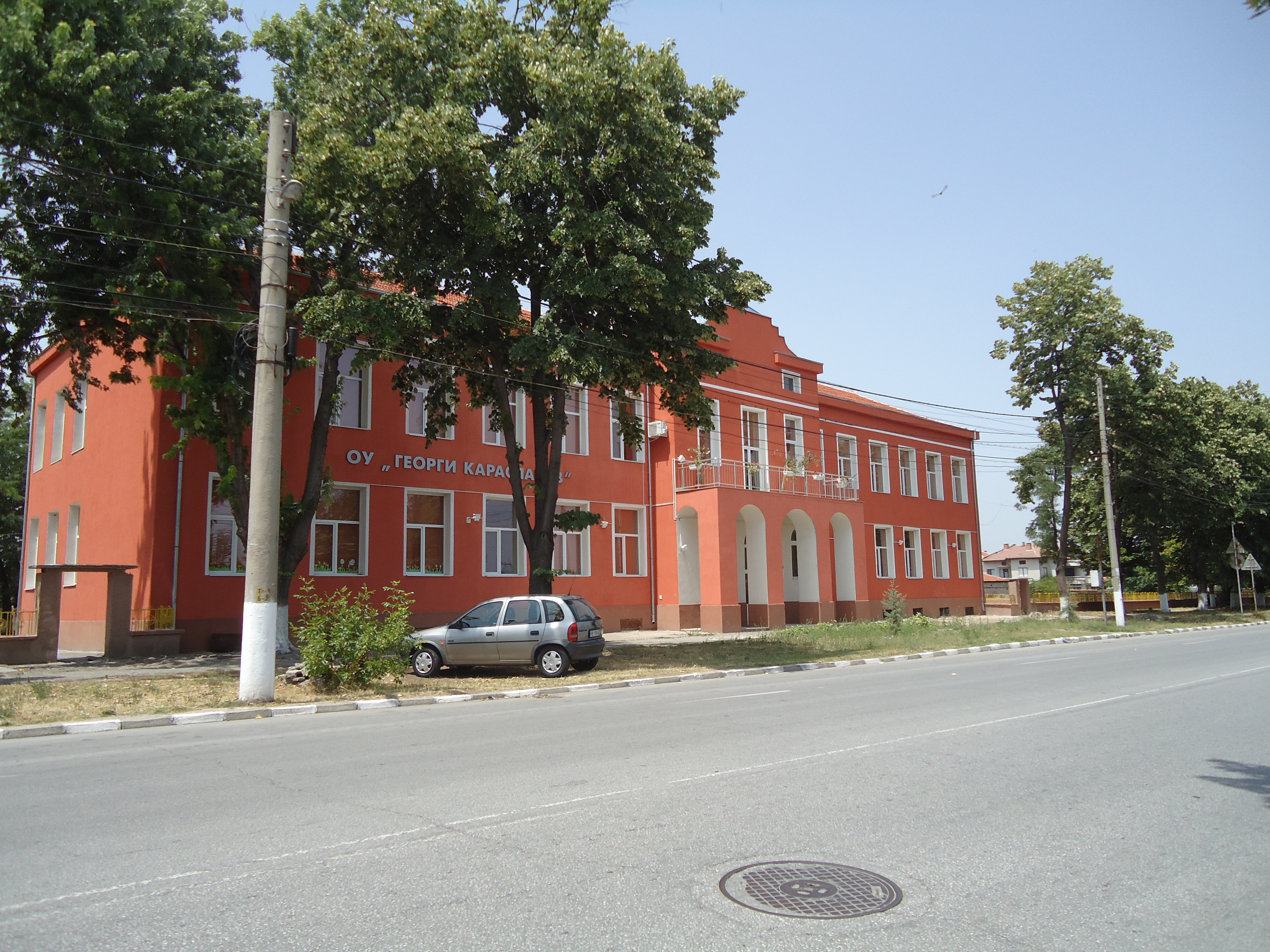
Georgi Karaslavov School, Parvomay

There are two high schools in Parvomay, the Vasil Levski School of Professional Agriculture and Economics northeast of the centre, and Prof. Dr. Asen Zlatarov High School west of the town centre. There are also three elementary schools: St. Cyril and Methodius and Georgi Karaslavov and Hristo Botev, just south of the town centre and two kindergartens, Osmi, Mart, and Maritsa. All of the schools in the town of Parvomay were extensively renovated in 2010 by the municipality. In the area of Parvomay there are also eight more elementary schools and five kindergartens.

In 1994, Bulgaria began the gasification of the country. The city of Parvomay had the first cubic meter of natural gas sold.

There are limited charter flights to the nearby Plovdiv International Airport just to the east of the Plovdiv Asenovgrad highway (12 km SE of Plovdiv). In 2010, scheduled flights began to London and Moscow in 2011 routes were expanded to Frankfurt.

The international European road Е-80 passes through the southern edge of the town and a branch of the Trakia highway (A1) passes very near on the way to Burgas.

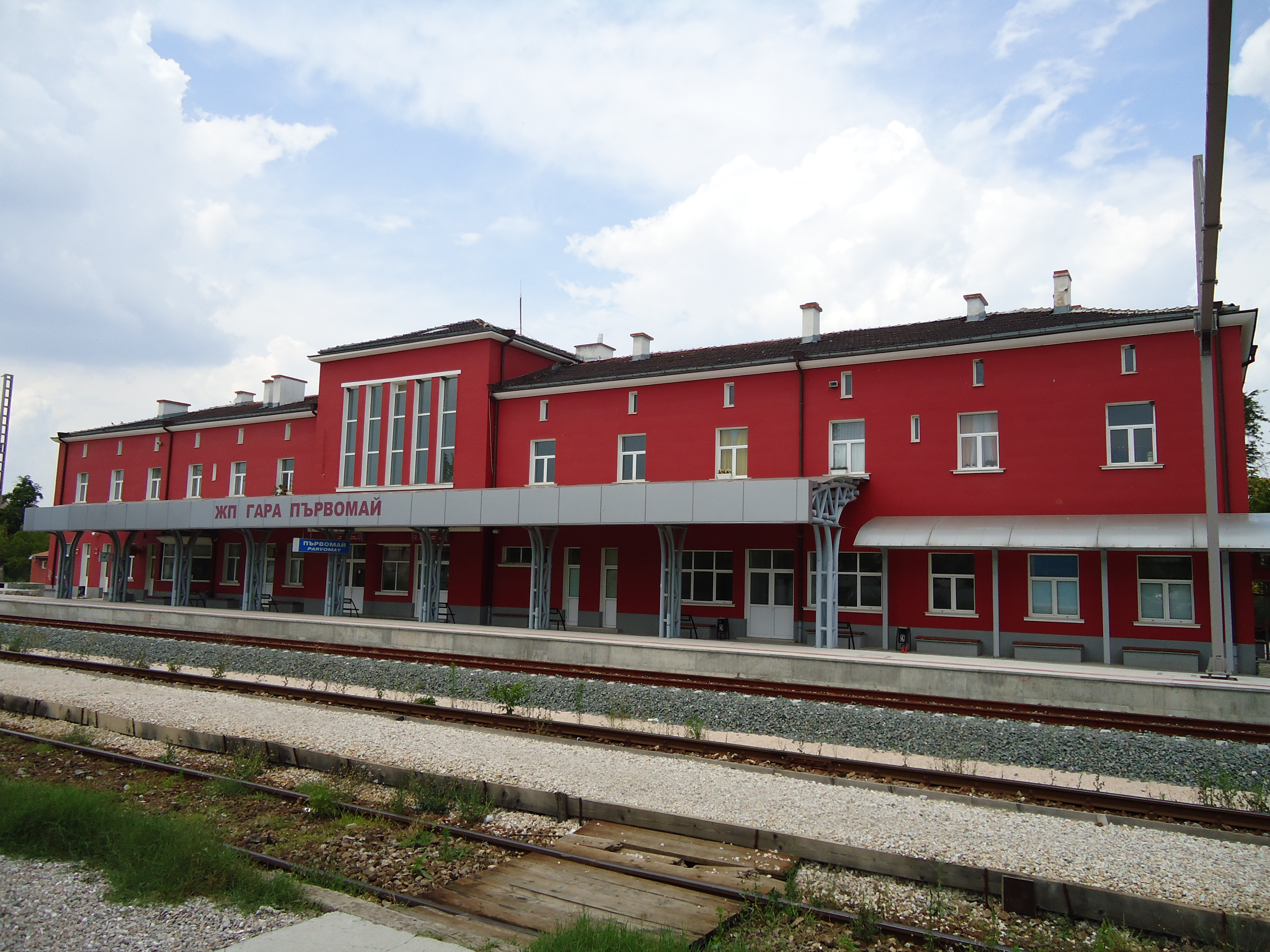
Parvomay Station during renovations

The railway line from Belovo to Dimitrovgrad, running through Parvomay officially opened in 1873 and now run by the Bulgarian State Railways as part of the line from Sofia to Istanbul. The upgrading of the Plovdiv-Svilengrad line was the biggest local project financed by EU's ISPA program at a cost of 340 million euros.

== Agriculture and environment ==
The Maritsa river runs to the East through the Municipality with the Mechka, Byala, and Kayaliyka rivers running North into the Maritsa with thermal mineral springs in Dragoinovo, Byala Reka, and Lenovo. The Mechka River runs through Lenovo, Poroyna, and along the southeastern edge of Parvomay Town. Falling from the Mechkovets Hills, the Kayaliyka River runs North through villages of Iskra, Bryagovo, Dragoinovo, Ezerovo, and Bodrovo joining the Marista 8 km to the east of Parvomay Town. The Byala River runs through Byala Reka village and Karadzhalovo. The main crops in the region of Municipality Parvomay are grain production, with 75,000 decares of wheat, barley 7,500 decares, and sunflower 13,200 decares. Agriculture and especially vegetable growing are of great importance for the Parvomay region it is one of the biggest producers of tomatoes, peppers, cucumbers and aubergine (egg-plant)in the Country. There are over 500 acres (2.0 km^{2}) greenhouses and over 60% of the arable land is irrigated. There are considerable crops of commercially grown grapes in the south around the village of Iskra, also Oriential (often known as Turkish Tobacco) and Large Leaf Tobacco in the area. The soils are predominantly black humus. There are also vast areas of oak and conifer forests on higher ground in the south. The lowland of the Maritsa river are mainly meadows with cinnamon soils.

== Climate and weather ==
The territory of Municipality Parvomay belongs to the area of transitive Mediterranean climate. The average temperature in January is 1˚ С, and about 25˚ С in July. The summer is dry and hot and the winter is comparatively mild. Unlike the nearby winter resort of Pamporovo to the south in the Rhodope Mountains the snowfall in the north of the area is thin and does not last being a little heavier in the south, although the snow of the Winter of 2009 was unusually heavy (50–60 cm). The total precipitation is below the average for the country, about 532 L/m^{2}. The precipitation is highest in December and May and lowest in August and February–March. The relative humidity is particularly low– up to 60%. The strongest wind comes from the North-West, mainly in May and June, when it blows for weeks with an average velocity of about 3 м/s. Short thunderstorms and hailstorms are quite common in summer and you may get some thick fogs in the North of the District along the Maritsa River but this is quite uncommon.

== Culture, events, and tourism ==
Religion

Parvomay town contains G. Karaslavov museum house and St. Dimiter Church (built in the period 1841–43) displays iconostasis and mural paintings of the Debar school. In the churchyard is one of the first secular schools in the country. Both are monitored by UNESCO. St. Archangel Michael (Архангел Михаил) church sits in the heart of the district of Liybenovo on the northeastern edge of the town and restored golden domed St. Georges Church (Църквата Св. Георги) in the centre. In contrast the Debar district of Parvomay is a modern designed Evangelical Catholic Church. The village of Iskra in the south has St. Georges Chapel (църквата Св. Георги,) built in 2010, St. Mary Church (църквата Св. Богородица) restored 2006.

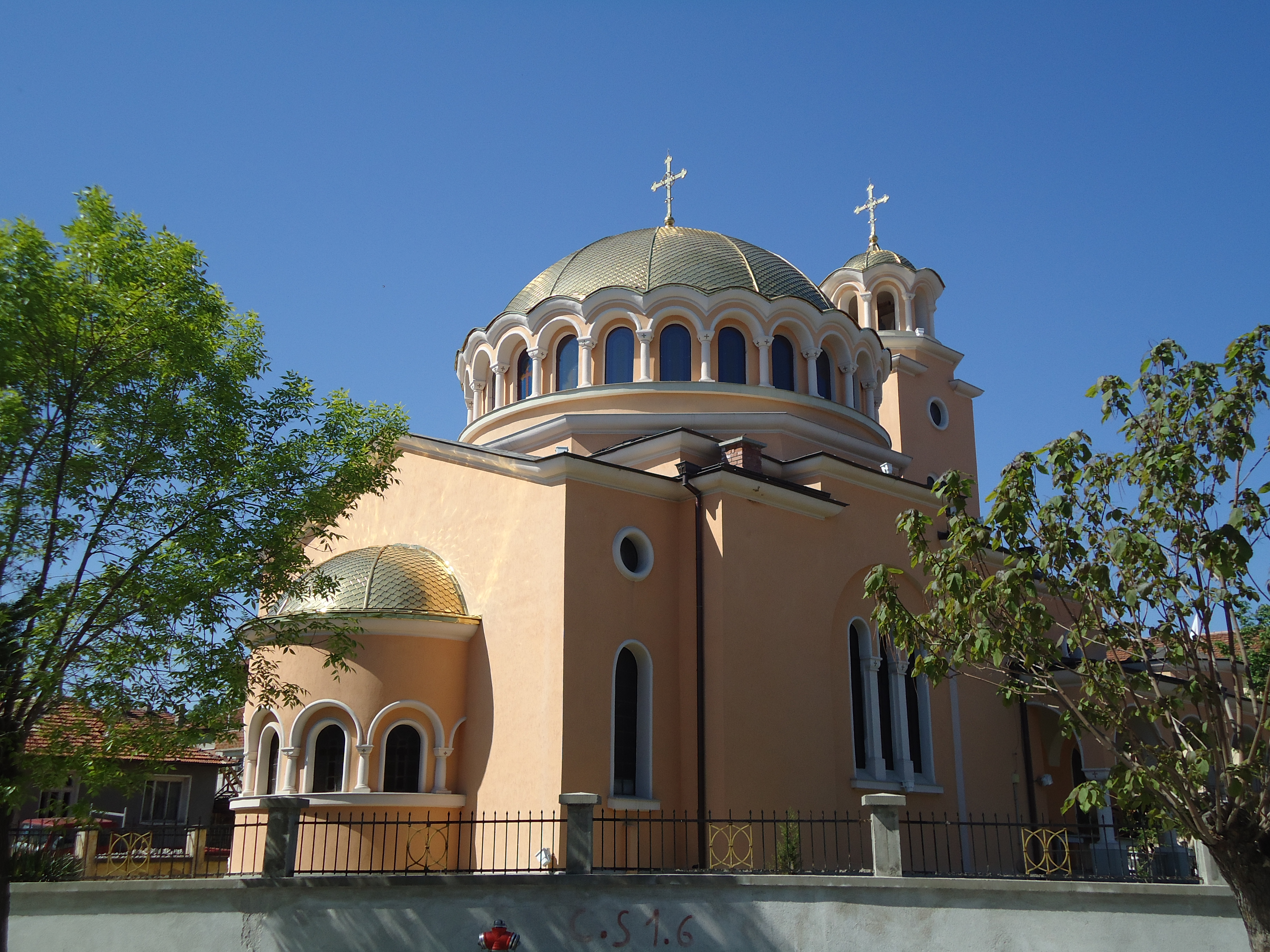
St. Georges Church, Parvomay

Sport

On the north western edge of the town Parvomay has a stadium with a capacity to seat 5,000 and nearby 'Fiesta' swimming complex, with "Hristo Boltev" football stadium (Стадион "Христо Ботев) on the south eastern edge.

Museum

Preserved ancient relics are displayed in a museum in the town the Primary School St. Cyril and Methodius and also the House of Culture in the village of Iskra.

Wine Fair in Parvomai

For the fifth year in February 2009 the Municipality of Parvomai and the St. Cyril and Methodius Community Centre organized a Wine and Wine-Production Fair together with a prize for best home-made wine. It was attended by a panel of technologists from visiting wineries – Asenovgrad AD Winery, Wine Cellar Reggina Estate Iskra, winery Zagreus AD Parvomai. The date is not chosen randomly. Beginning of February is the time when the vines and abandon Trifon's Day celebrates the feast of-grower. St. Trifon, as patron saint of vineyards is unique to the Balkans and mainly where Bulgarians and Greeks live.

May Cultural Festival

During the month of May the May Cultural Festival is held in the town of Parvomay, where the people of Parvomay and their guests gather at the halls of the Community Centre to meet the art of the visiting theatres, the local dramatic and music-folklore teams, national favorite and local artists and a lot more interesting additional events. In May 2010, Parvomay Rock Fest was held in the centre of the town, a one-day event of rock music sponsored by the Municipality and local company, EcoGas.

Folklore Music and Song Festival

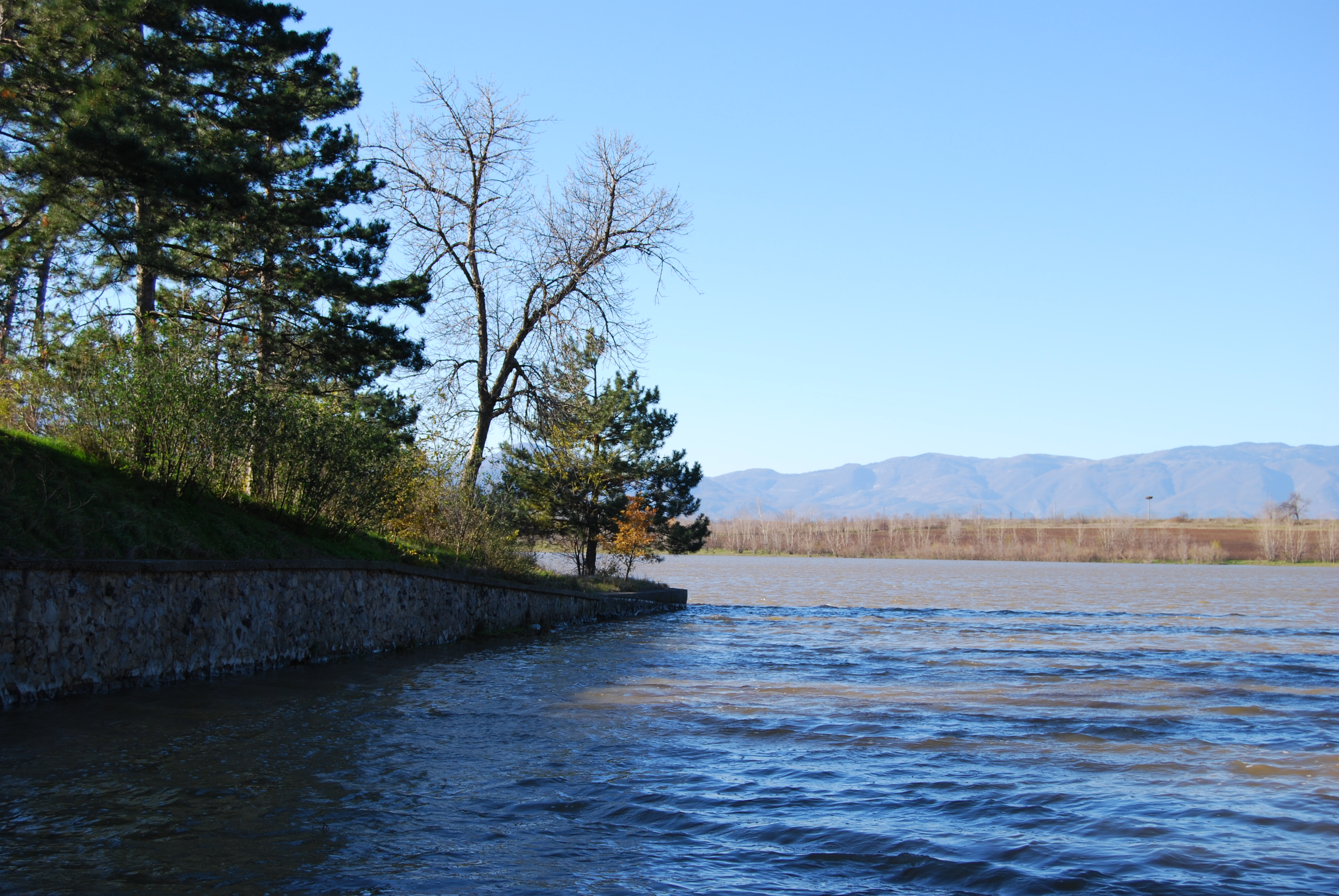
Bryagovo Lake, south of Bryagovo village

As well as the Dragoynovo Festival in June and Iskra Festival in August, the city of Parvomay Festival takes place in September which is a celebration of Thracian Music and Songs. Many national orchestras, folklore groups, and single artists take part in the centre of Parvomay town.

October is Poetry Month.

Tourism

Tourism in the Municipality is somewhat underdeveloped but growing, with new hotels opening such as the 'Tzarigrad' in Debar south of Parvomay town and 'Finest' in the centre. Local attractions include thermal mineral springs in Dragoinovo, Byala Reka, and Lenovo. The surroundings of Vinitsa are a unique place in Bulgaria as the rare summer snowflake (Leucojum) grows there. Moreover, the village of Iskra hosts a special celebration known as Iskra Festival, which features Folk Music, dancing, food. A dam of the river Kayaliyka between Iskra and Bryagovo forms Bryagovo Lake. Bryagovo Lake is where local hunting clubs host clay pigeon shooting competition every September close to a Hotel overlooking the lake. There has been a recent development of water-motor sports and fishing tourism at this lake and the nearby Mechka River. A second dam of the Kayaliyka river at Ezerovo forms a sizable lake which is a popular summer spot for local visitors and fishing. Furthermore, in Tatarevo and Iskra there has been a growth and development in business tourism related to production and tasting of local wines.

== Notable people ==
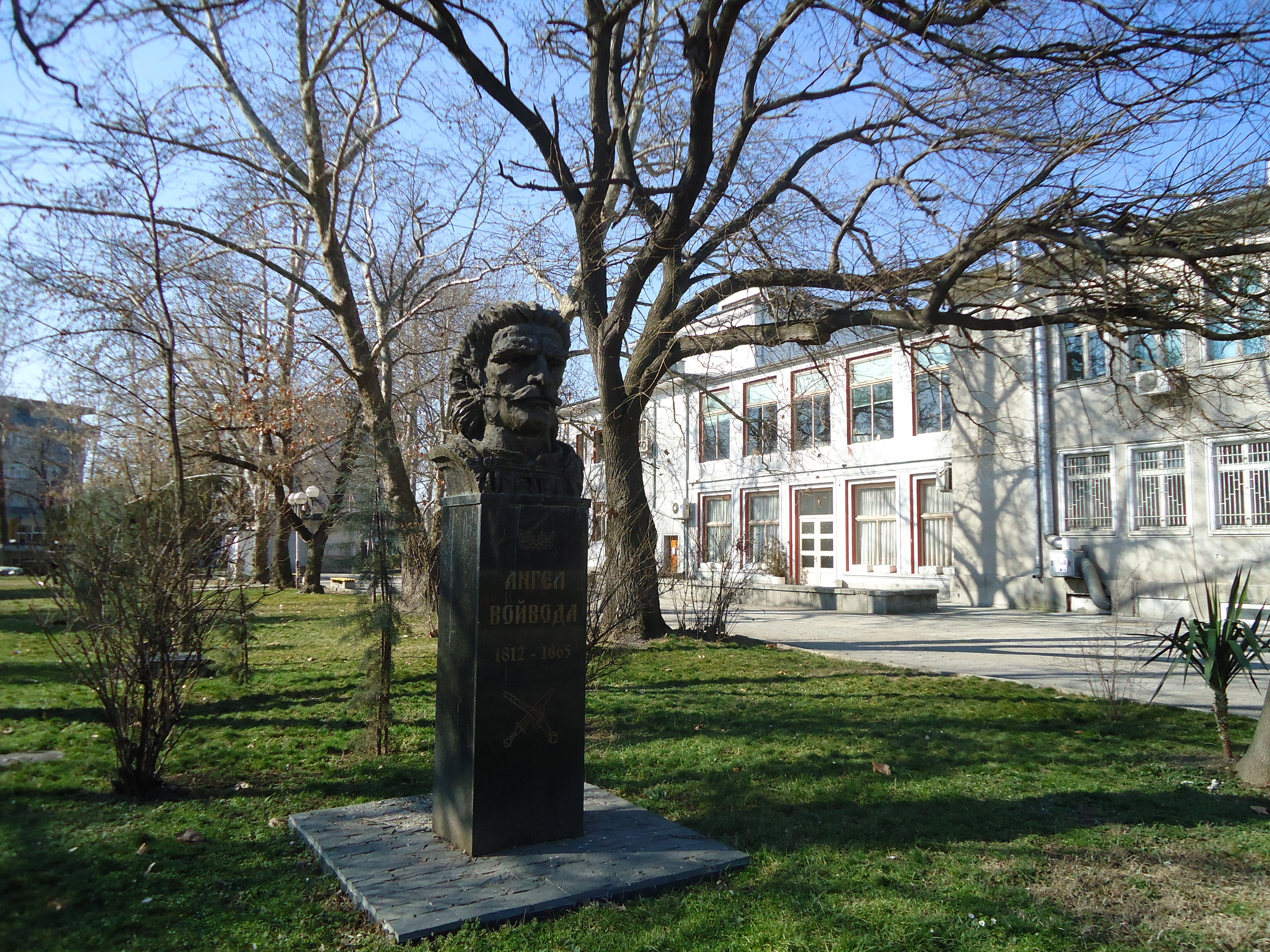
Angel Voyvoda Bust, Parvomay Park

- Angel Stoyanov Kariotov (1812 – c. 1864), warlord
- Georgi Karaslavov (1904–1980), writer
- Dimiter Gotscheff (born 1943), theater director.
- Lilcho Arsov (born 1972), athlete
- Tezdzhan Naimova (born 1988), athlete

== Antarctic namesake ==
Parvomay Neck on Greenwich Island in the South Shetland Islands, Antarctica is named after Parvomay.
