= Angel Voyvoda =

Angel Stoyanov Kariotov
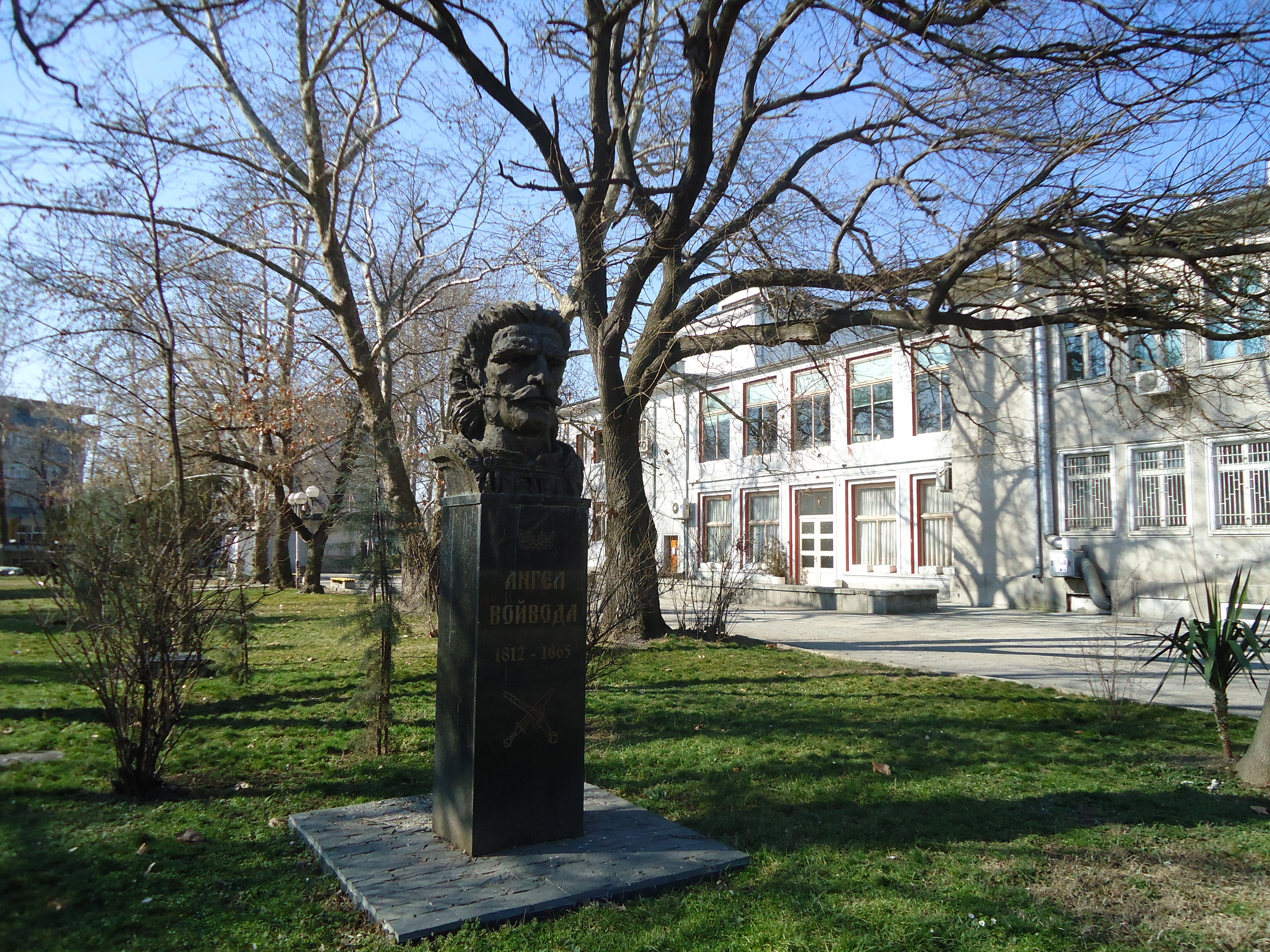
- Bust of Vojvoda in Parvomay, Plovdiv District
- Born: 21 September 1812; Dragoynovo, Bulgaria
- Died: c. 1864 (aged 51–52); Hilandar, Mount Atos, Greece.

Angel Stoyanov Kariotov (Bulgarian: Ангел Стоянов Кариотов; 1812 – c. 1864), also known as Angel Vojvoda (Ангел войвода), was one of the biggest voivods in Bulgarian history, who led the well-organized band in the regions of Plovdiv and Haskovo around 1832 and 1862. He was born in the Rodоpean village Dragoynovo in the Municipality of Parvomay. The Angel Peak in Mount Rila is named after him. Angel Vojvoda was also a main contributor and initiator of the only Bulgarian monastery built during the Ottoman dominance - the Arapovo Monastery "St. Nedelya".
