= Karadzhalovo Solar Park =

Photovoltaic power station in Bulgaria

- Country: Bulgaria
- Location: Karadzhalovo Parvomay Municipality
- Coordinates: 42°06′17″N 25°19′18″E
- Status: Operational
- Commission date: March 2012
- Construction cost: BGN 350 million (around $248 million)
- Owner: ACF Renewable Energy

Solar farm
- Type: Flat-panel PV

Power generation
- Units operational: 214,000
- Nameplate capacity: 60.4 MW

The Karadzhalovo Solar Park is a 60.4 megawatt (MW) solar farm, one of the largest in Bulgaria. It has 214,000 photovoltaic panels, and cost 350 million Bulgarian lev (approximatively $248 million). It has been completed in March 2012 after 4 month of construction.

== Financing ==
The total project cost amounting to 181.4 million in Euro was financed by:

- a loan of EUR 155 million from a group of investors led by IFC with
  - IFC (International Financial Corporation) providing EUR 46.1 million
  - UniCredit Group - EUR 41.1 million
  - OPIC (Overseas Private Investment Corporation) - EUR 50 million
- UniCredit Bulbank Bulgaria completed the investment with a separate EUR 30 million loan

Three month after completion, it was resold to the Malta-based ACF Renewable Energy, which is reported to be owned by investors from the US, Sri Lanka, India and Pakistan. The selling price has been reported to be equal to the construction price of BGN 350 million.

== See also ==
- Photovoltaic power station
- List of largest power stations
- List of photovoltaic power stations
