= Gradina, Plovdiv Province =

Gradina Градина
- Village
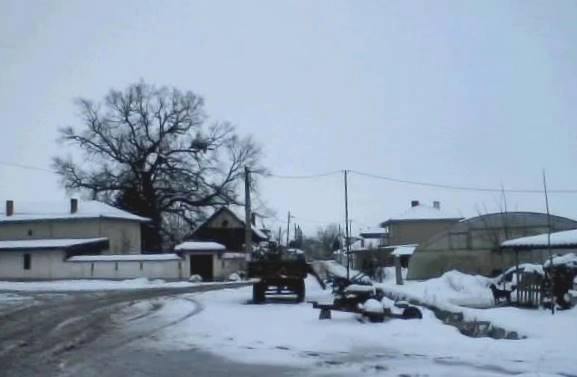
- Photo of the centuries old oak in the village Gradina

- Location within Bulgaria
- Coordinates: 42.133333°N 25.2°E
- Country: Bulgaria
- Province: Plovdiv Province
- Municipality: Parvomay Municipality

Population
  - Total: 2,192
  - Density: 58.8/km^{2} (152/sq mi)
- Area code: 03162

Gradina is a village in Southern Bulgaria, located in Plovdiv Province, Parvomay Municipality. As of the June 2020 census of Bulgaria, the total population count of the village is 2192.

== Geography ==
In the land area of Gradina village there are around 2460 acres of forest. The largest locality of marsh snowdrop in Southern Bulgaria can be found. The area is used for ecological tourism, scientific observations and measurements and has a conservative significance of national and European importance.

The plant is used in the development in many cures. The snowdrop locality is included in a project which would eventually lead in the area becoming a protected area.

== History ==
The first written mention of the village was in 1576 in Ottoman documents. Gradina village was officially established in 1885. The oldest name of the village is Chakardzhii. In 1906 it was renamed to Tsarsko selo and it took the name Gradina on 8 February 1950 after a vote of the villagers.

Between 1934 and 1944, Tsarsko selo was the municipality centre, governing the nearby villages Dobri Dol, Krushevo and Plodovitovo.
