= Iskra, Plovdiv Province =

Iskra Искра
- Village
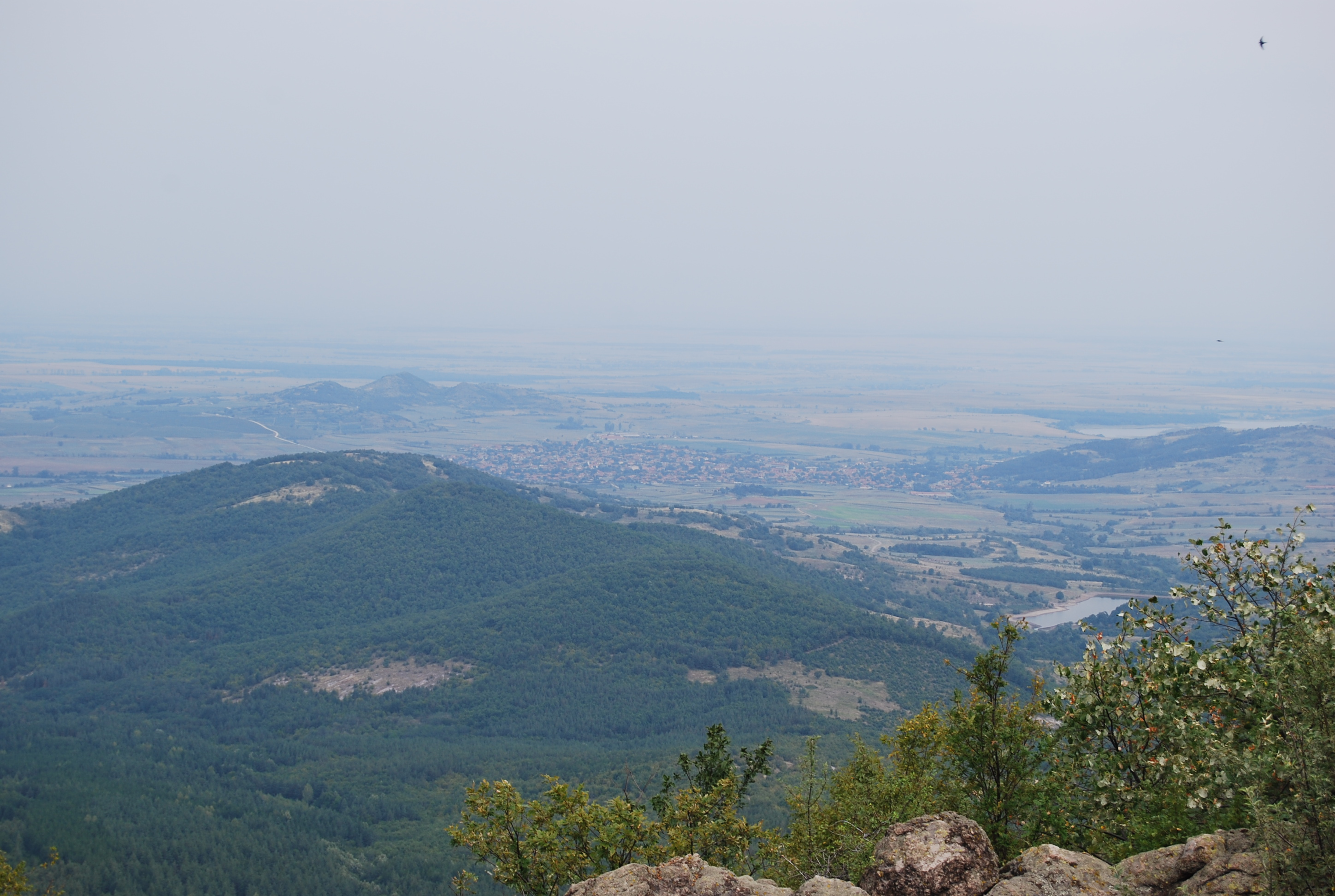
- Iskra Village from the south

- Location within Bulgaria
- Coordinates: 41°56′N 25°08′E
- Country: Bulgaria
- Province: Plovdiv Province
- Municipality: Parvomay

Area
  - Total: 63.929 km^{2} (24.683 sq mi)
- Elevation: 299 m (981 ft)

Population (2010)
  - Total: 1,481
- Time zone: UTC+2 (EET)
  - Summer (DST): UTC+3 (EEST)
- Postal Code: 4132
- Area code: 03163

Iskra (Bulgarian: Искра) is a village in southern Bulgaria it is the southernmost village in the Parvomay Municipality, Plovdiv Province. It has the largest population outside the town of Parvomay in the municipality. It is 22 km to the south of Parvomay town, 8 km to the north of village Novakovo, 7 km to the east of village Lenovo and 8 km to the south of village Bryagovo.

== Politics ==
Mayors

- Mayor of Parvomay: Angel Papazov (NSP, OSD)
- Mayor of Iskra: Dimitar Nestorov (Independent)

== History ==
=== Village name ===
The village has had a variety of names such as Kardzhilare (written formally Karadzhilar the Turkish for 'deer') until 1906, then called Popovo from 1906 until 1950 when it became Iskra. Iskra or Ashkenazi is named after the young Jewish partisan - Clara Ashkenazi who died in the nearby Novakovo hills to the south. In 1950 the village erected a bust monument in her honour.

=== Historic settlements ===
Situated near the village are many mounds that suggest the existence of Thracian settlements in this region. Kameniviya Hissar (Hisar Little, Taushanitsa) where, according to Paul Deliradev and Ivan Velikov are situated a Thracian fortress and settlement. In the eastern foothills of the Great Hisar (about two kilometers northwest of the village) there are traces of late Roman settlement and at the very top – Big Hisar – are remnants of a town site, which according to Dr. Ivan Velikov date from the 11th or 12th century, i.e. since the Second Bulgarian State. Around Iskra are many Roman, Venetian, Dubrovnik and Bulgarian coins, the latter mostly from the time of the 14th century Bulgarian emperors Ivan Alexander and Ivan Shishman. It is believed that the village was home to one of the Christian bishops of the First Bulgarian Empire, namely the Episcopal Bukovo of 9th–10th century.

There are many tales of a considerable population around the village of Iskra during the Thracian, Roman, Byzantine, until the collapse of the Bulgarian state under Ottoman occupation.

In late 1670 or early 1671 years the famous Turkish traveler Evliya Çelebi, traveling from Asenovgrad to Edirne passed through the village Papaz (then Popovo). This is the first mention of Iskra in modern documents and it demonstrates both the importance of the settlement and to clear his Bulgarian identity.

Further information on the village is tied into legends. According to them, the oldest of the village is available in Popovi - five kilometers south of where it was purely Bulgarian. Here are the remains of walls, wells and cemeteries. Hence the origin and a large trove of about 800 silver coins of the Roman Republic, which opened in 1929, it is called Popova and mentioned by Evliya Çelebi.

Southwest of Iskra has traces of another village: foundations of rural churches, crosses, night-lights, and the remains of two older buildings - perhaps fortresses.

Due to increased danger of invaders, the village split, perhaps 30–40 homes moved and settled in their present place. The rest went further and established the present village Popovitsa - in Sadovo municipality.

The new place named for the village Kardzhilare, written formally as Karadzhilar. This word in Turkish means deer.

The location of the village was seen as favorable, situated in a sheltered hollow on the banks of the river Kayaliyka / divide between Eastern and Western Rhodope / attracted many settlers, not only Bulgarians. Bulgarians groups roamed across the vast territory of the settlement. They formed small settlements in many places, as evidenced by the open scattered separate cemeteries, the settlement patterns have spread around the area over the years.

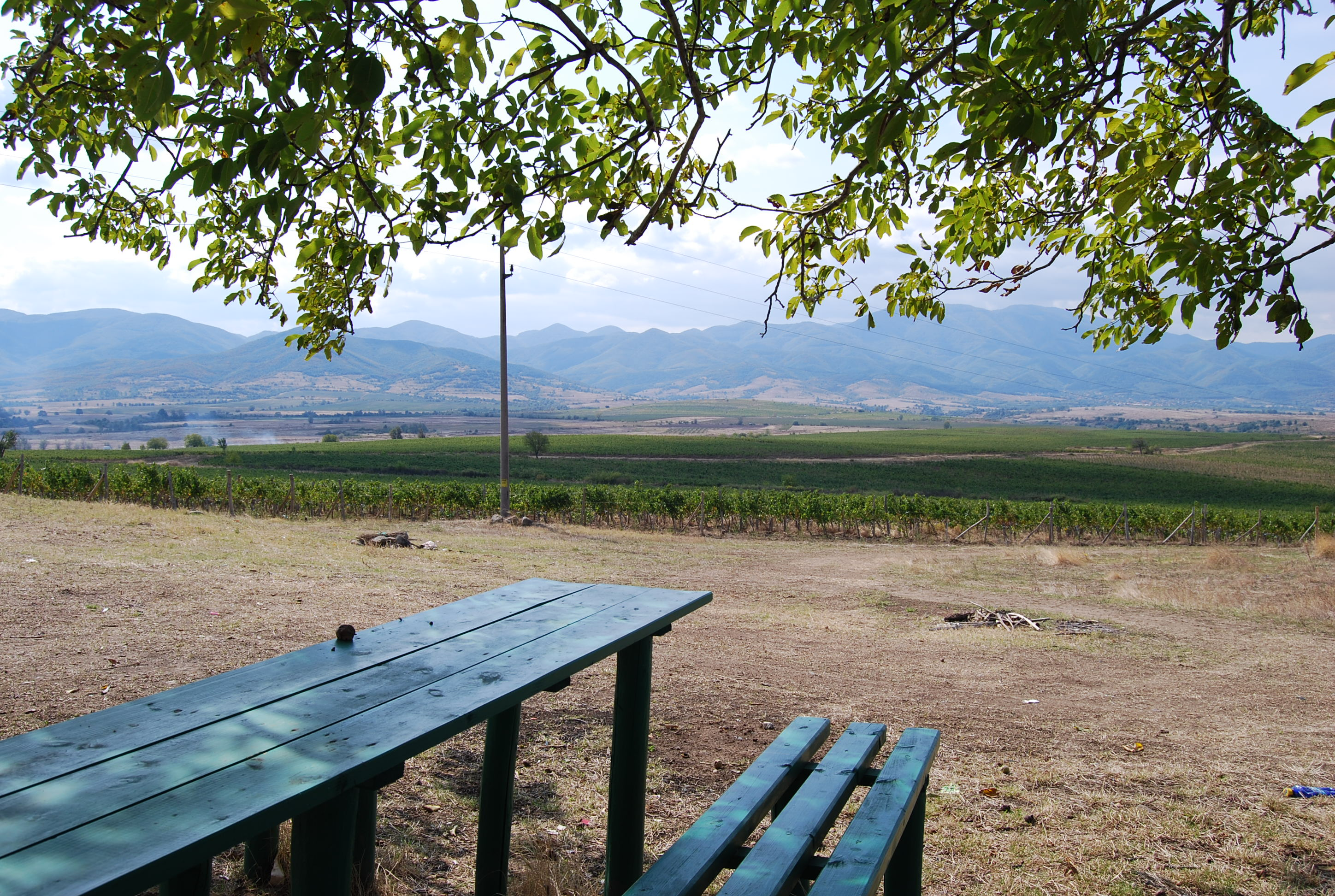
Grape production near village Iskra

== Culture and events ==
Religion St. Mary Church (църквата Св. Богородица) in the centre of the village was restored in 2006 with Government funds as part of the Beautiful Bulgaria project.

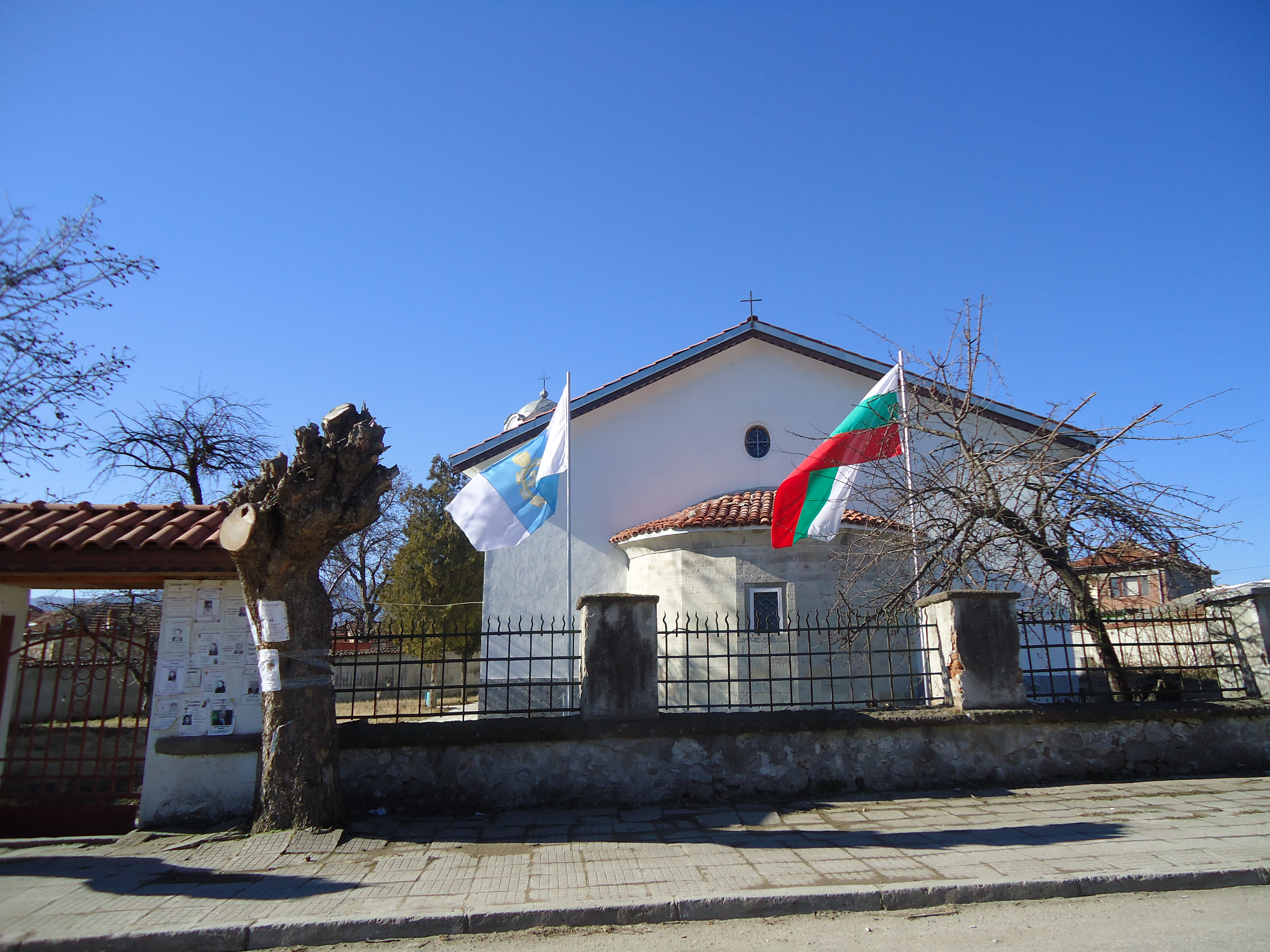
St Marys Church Iskra restored 2006

Towards the southern edge of the village, St. Georges Chapel (църквата Св. Георги,) was built in 2009 through public contributions and has community facilities set in a small park.

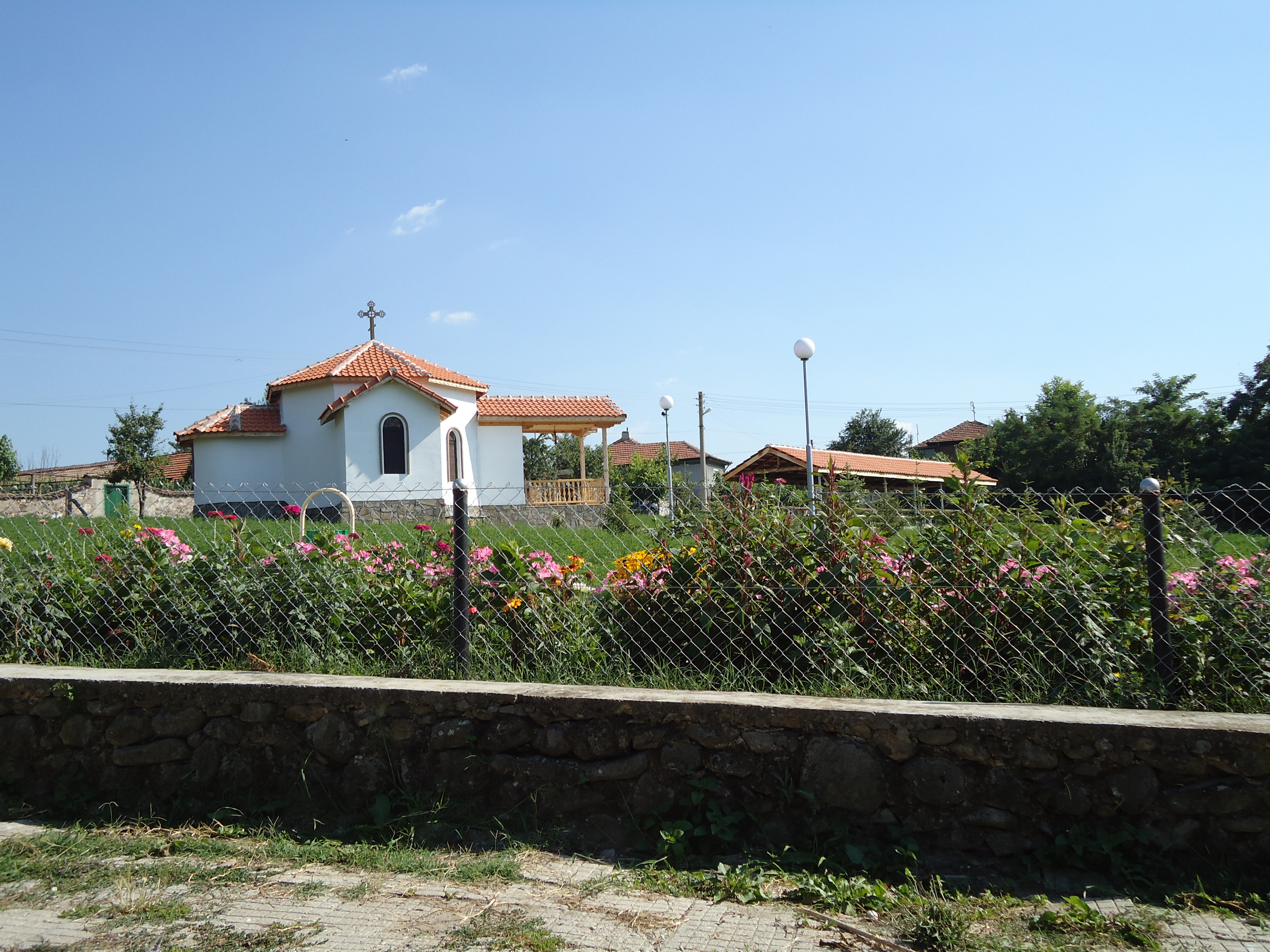
St.Georges Chapel, Iskra, Parvomay. Built 2009

a new covered Sunday Market was also built in 2011.

Education The village of Iskra has "Otets Paisiy" Primary school, "Ivan Vazov" Community Center and "Iskra" Kindergarten.

Festival Village in August holds the фестивал Искра (Iskra Festival), which is a celebration of Folk Music, dancing, food and wine drawing as many as 2000 people. It is held in the centre of the village near to the House of Culture, Village Hall and a number of small shops and cafes.

== Population ==
In 1855, the village had about 130 houses. Some of the oldest family names are Karaivanov, Bonev, Dzhangozovtsi, Borizanovi, Chalakovtsi, Gaydadzhievtsi, Katrandjiev, Bichovtsi, Akabalievtsi, Nalbantovtsi, Margaritova, Kadiev, Sirakovi and others. The Census of 1885 the village had 484 houses with 2,417 inhabitants. By 1896 the number of inhabitants grew steadily to reach a peak of 4,000. In 1934 it had 1,829 remaining at this level but falling slightly to 1,481 by 2010.
