= Byala Reka, Plovdiv Province =

Byala Reka Бяла река
- Village
- Location within Bulgaria
- Coordinates: 42°3′28″N 25°15′41″E
- Country: Bulgaria
- Oblast: Plovdiv
- Opština: Parvomay

Government
  - Mayor (Municipality): Nikolai Mitkov (BSP, The Left!, BV, ITN)
  - Mayor (Town Hall): Petkana Dobreva (ZS-AS, SDS, IMRO-NIU)

Area
  - Total: 22.568 km^{2} (8.714 sq mi)
- Elevation: 151 m (495 ft)

Population (2024)
  - Total: 629
  - Density: 27.9/km^{2} (72.2/sq mi)
- Postal code: 4285
- Area code: 03166
- Vehicle registration: РВ

Byala Reka is a village in Parvomay Municipality, Plovdiv Province, Bulgaria. In 2006, the population was 969.

== See also ==
- Geography of Bulgaria
- History of Bulgaria
- List of cities in Bulgaria
