= Yugovo =

Yugovo Югово
- Selo
- Location within Republic of Buryatia Location within Russia
- Coordinates: 52°07′N 107°06′E
- Country: Russia
- Region: Republic of Buryatia
- District: Pribaykalsky District
- Time zone: UTC+8:00

Yugovo (Russian: Югово) is a rural locality (a selo) in Pribaykalsky District, Republic of Buryatia, Russia. The population was 428 as of 2010. There are 8 streets.

== Geography ==
Yugovo is located 41 km southwest of Turuntayevo (the district's administrative centre) by road. Talovka is the nearest rural locality.
