= Dragoynovo =

Dragoynovo Драгойново
- Village
- Location within Bulgaria
- Coordinates: 41.993333°N 25.231944°E
- Country: Bulgaria
- Province: Plovdiv Province
- Municipality: Parvomay Municipality

Area
  - Total: 36.382 km^{2} (14.047 sq mi)

Population
  - Total: 243
  - Density: 6.68/km^{2} (17.3/sq mi)

Dragoynovo is a village in southern Bulgaria, part of Parvomay Municipality in Plovdiv Province. It lies at the northern foot of the Dragoyna ridge, in an area with numerous archaeological sites dating from prehistory, antiquity and the Middle Ages. Among the most significant landmarks are the fortified settlement on Dragoyna Peak, the Late Antique complex at its northern foot, and the Bulgarian National Revival Church of St. George, completed in 1853. The village and its surroundings have numerous water sources, as well as the Dragoynovo mineral-water deposit.

== Geography ==
Dragoynovo is situated in the southern part of Parvomay Municipality, at the foot of the Dragoyna ridge. Part of the village territory extends over the hilly northern slopes of the ridge, while to the north the terrain gradually descends towards the lower hills and plains.

The Kayaliyka (Skalichitsa), a right tributary of the Maritsa, flows through the village. It drains the northwestern slopes of the Dragoyna ridge and the western part of the Haskovo Hills.

The local climate is transitional continental and belongs to the climatic subregion of the Upper Thracian Plain. The mean annual temperature in the area is approximately 12 °C; average temperatures are −0.4 °C in January and 23.2 °C in July. Mean annual precipitation is about 539 mm, and permanent snow cover is uncommon.

There are several spring catchments in the territory of Dragoynovo and numerous public fountains in and around the village. Immediately west of the village lies the Dragoynovo mineral-water deposit. Water from borehole No. 9 is hypothermal and weakly mineralised, of hydrocarbonate sodium-calcium and siliceous type. An analysis conducted in 2025 measured a temperature of 20 °C and total mineralisation of 435 mg/L.

Part of the territory of Dragoynovo falls within the Middle Rhodopes protected area (BG0001031) of the European Natura 2000 ecological network.

== History ==
=== Antiquity and the Middle Ages ===
The area around Dragoynovo has been inhabited since prehistoric times. Archaeological field surveys of the Dragoyna ridge have recorded 53 sites dating from the Chalcolithic to the Late Middle Ages. Settlement became more intensive during the Late Bronze Age. A fortified settlement existed on Dragoyna Peak and developed through the Bronze and Iron Ages. During the Early Hellenistic period its inhabited area expanded and several routes led to the settlement. It ceased to exist around the end of the 3rd century BC.

The settlement centre on Dragoyna was probably connected with the burial-mound necropolis along both banks of the Kayaliyka between present-day Ezerovo and Bryagovo, where thirteen tumuli have been recorded. The famous Ezerovo ring, bearing an inscription in the Thracian language, was discovered in one of them.

During Late Antiquity, the main centre at the northern foot of the ridge developed in the localities of Hisarya, Grobeto and Tsarkvishteto. Fortifications and substantial buildings have been identified at Hisarya, while a paved road approximately 2.70 m wide has been traced southwards from the presumed entrance to the fortification.

During the Middle Ages the fortified site was used as a Christian ecclesiastical and monastic centre. Several successive churches have been excavated. The earliest probably functioned until the late 11th or early 12th century, while its successor was in use from the second half of the 12th through the 13th century; there is no firm evidence that it continued to function during the 14th century. Finds include fragments of wall paintings and pieces of a ceramic vessel bearing an underglaze inscription in Greek.

A hypothesis has been proposed that the medieval ecclesiastical sites near Dragoynovo and Iskra may be associated with the bishopric of Bukovo known from Byzantine episcopal lists, although its identification with this area remains unproven.

=== Ottoman Period ===
The earliest securely identified written record of present-day Dragoynovo dates to 1570. An Ottoman register records the settlement as “Novasil, also called Kotluca” (Novasil nam-ı diğer Kotluca), as part of the waqf of Suleiman the Magnificent in the kaza of Filibe (Plovdiv). The register states that the village lay on the road between Filibe and Edirne and was situated in a “dangerous and enclosed place”.

In 1570, 66 Christians liable for the jizya tax and four widowed households were recorded. The total registered revenue from the village amounted to 9,281 akçe. Tax entries indicate the production of grain, grapes, vegetables and flax, as well as sheep and pig husbandry, winemaking and the operation of watermills.

Because of its position on the important road between Plovdiv and Edirne, the village acquired derbend status, under which inhabitants of strategically located settlements performed road- and pass-guarding duties; it was also recorded as Kotluca/Koyluca Derbend. A register of sheep suppliers from 1576 records three inhabitants of the village. In 1596, 84 Christians were registered, including sixteen newcomers and two millers.

=== Bulgarian National Revival ===
Angel Kariotov (Angel Voyvoda), born in 1812 in the village, then known as Kozluk, is closely associated with Dragoynovo. His armed band operated in Thrace and the Rhodopes during the first half of the 19th century. He was later associated with charitable contributions to the Arapovo Monastery.

Archival records concerning the Church of St. George survive in the papers of Archimandrite Chrysanthos held by the Bulgarian Historical Archive. According to them, construction of the church in Kozluk began in 1853. It was subsequently restored by Archimandrite Chrysanthos and Bishop Hilarion and was looted sometime after 1856.

=== After the Liberation ===
Following the Russo-Turkish War (1877–1878), Kozluk became part of Eastern Rumelia. After the Unification of Bulgaria in 1885 it became part of the Principality of Bulgaria.

Statistics from the first years after the Unification differ considerably in their classification of the village's population. According to figures for 1885 cited by Konstantin Jireček, Kozluk had 890 Bulgarians, 425 Greeks, 40 Roma and three Turks, while in 1888 the figures were 1,396 Bulgarians, 37 Roma and only four Greeks. Jireček himself noted that the published censuses for the region were “full of contradictions”.

By Decree No. 462, promulgated on 21 December 1906, Kozluk was officially renamed Dragoynovo. The local chitalishte, now named Petar Delchev Orlovski – 1909, was founded in 1909.

Residents of Dragoynovo took part in Bulgaria's wars of national unification. Among them was Corporal Zapryan Angov Ganev of the 6th Cavalry Regiment, who was killed on 5 September 1916 in fighting near Smolnitsa during the Battle of Dobrich.

The population of Dragoynovo reached 2,349 in the 1934 census.

=== After 1944 ===
On 1 June 1947 the Dr Simeon Grozev collective agricultural cooperative was established in Dragoynovo. From 1959 to 1961 it operated as an agricultural brigade within the Nov Zhivot cooperative in Byala Reka; from 1962 to 1975 it again functioned as an independent cooperative, and from 1976 until 1989 as a brigade of the agro-industrial complex in Parvomay.

During the second half of the 20th century the population declined substantially, from 2,279 in 1946 to 1,999 in 1956, 1,529 in 1965, 1,179 in 1975 and 877 in 1985.

In 1989, borehole No. 9 was constructed as part of the Dragoynovo mineral-water deposit. The borehole reaches a depth of 296 m.

== Cultural and Natural Landmarks ==
=== Archaeological Sites ===
A fortified settlement centre on Dragoyna Peak was inhabited from the beginning of the Late Bronze Age until the end of the Early Hellenistic period. Systematic archaeological excavations began in 2004.

At the northern foot of Dragoyna is a substantial Late Antique settlement complex comprising the sites of Hisarya, Tsarkvishteto and Grobeto. Remains of a Late Antique fortress and a medieval monastic complex have been uncovered at Hisarya, while Tsarkvishteto has also been the subject of archaeological excavations.

Burial mounds are also known within the village territory. In 2007 a rescue excavation was carried out at Tumulus No. 1 in the Sinorska Chuka locality.

The St. Peter Chapel is located at the foot of Dragoyna. Archaeological field surveys in its vicinity have identified Early Medieval pottery dated to the 10th–12th centuries.

=== Church of St. George ===
The Bulgarian National Revival Church of St. George in the centre of Dragoynovo was completed in 1853. It is listed as an immovable cultural property of architectural and artistic significance.

The church preserves a number of icons by the Edirne-based late National Revival painter Stephanos K. Nikitas, most of them dating from 1853.

A number of older residential buildings of architectural and constructional value are also registered in Dragoynovo.

== Annual Events ==
Every year around the Feast of Saints Peter and Paul (29 June), Dragoynovo holds its traditional village fair.

== Notable people ==
- Angel Voyvoda (1812–1864), hajduk leader.
- Atanas Zapryanov (born 1950), lieutenant general of the reserve and Minister of Defence of Bulgaria from 2024 to 2026.
- Yordan Kyumyurdzhiev (1953–2024), major general in the Bulgarian Ministry of Interior and former director of the Plovdiv Regional Directorate of Internal Affairs.
- Paun Vezirev, local Bulgarian National Revival figure and donor associated with the construction of the Church of St. George.
- Dr Simeon Grozev (1909–1937), physician and volunteer in the International Brigades during the Spanish Civil War, killed at Brunete.
- Raycho Dimitrov Kirkov (1906–1944), member of the Plovdiv District Committee of the Bulgarian Workers' Party.

== Tourism ==
Dragoynovo is a starting point for marked hiking routes to Dragoyna Peak and other parts of the ridge. One of the natural attractions of the area is a population of wild red peony (Paeonia peregrina) in the locality known as Bozhur Polyana (“Peony Meadow”). Nearby Ezerovo Reservoir is used for recreational fishing and outings.

The area also offers opportunities for cultural and archaeological tourism centred on the archaeological sites on Dragoyna Peak and at its foot. Parvomay Municipality identifies the Ezerovo–Dragoynovo–Bukovo area as having particularly strong potential for the development of cultural and historical tourism.
