= Georgi Karaslavov =

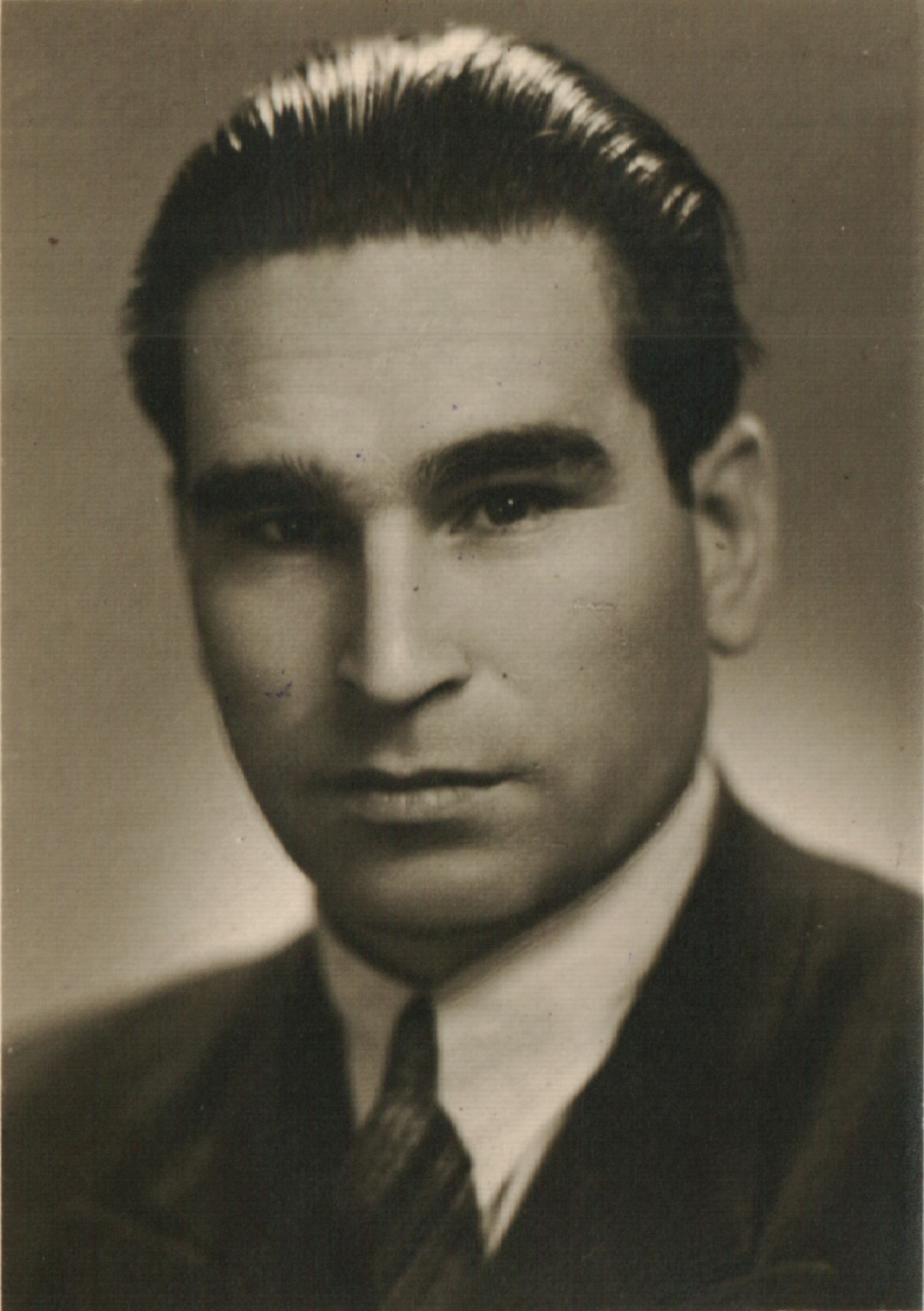
- Born: 12 January 1904; Plovdiv, Principality of Bulgaria
- Died: 26 January 1980 (aged 76); Sofia, People's Republic of Bulgaria
- Occupation: Writer

Georgi Slavov Karaslavov (Bulgarian: Георги Славов Караславов; 12 January 1904 in Plovdiv – 26 January 1980 in Sofia) was a Bulgarian writer born in the Debar district of the town of Parvomay in Plovdiv Province. Several of his novels, including Snaha, Tatul, and Selkor, were made into films.

After he graduated from high school in 1922, he moved to live in Sofia, and studied at the Postal School. In 1923, he studied in a pedagogical school in Harmanli and continued his education by moving to Kazanlak. He took part in the September uprising. Afterward, he signed up and graduated from Sofia University in 1928.

Because of his short novel named "Selkor", he was sentenced and imprisoned by the anti-communist regime that ruled Bulgaria at the time.

Between 1947 and 1949 Georgi Karaslavov was the director of the Ivan Vazov National Theater.

== Honors ==
A school in Sofia is named for Karaslavov, and there is a bust of Karaslavov in the park behind Vasil Levski National Stadium in Sofia. A full size statue of Karaslavov has been placed in the town of Parvomay.

There is the Georgi Karaslavov Award (National Literature Award "Georgi Karaslavov") named in his honor.
