= Parvomay Municipality =

Municipality in Plovdiv, Bulgaria

Coordinates: 42°06′N 25°13′E

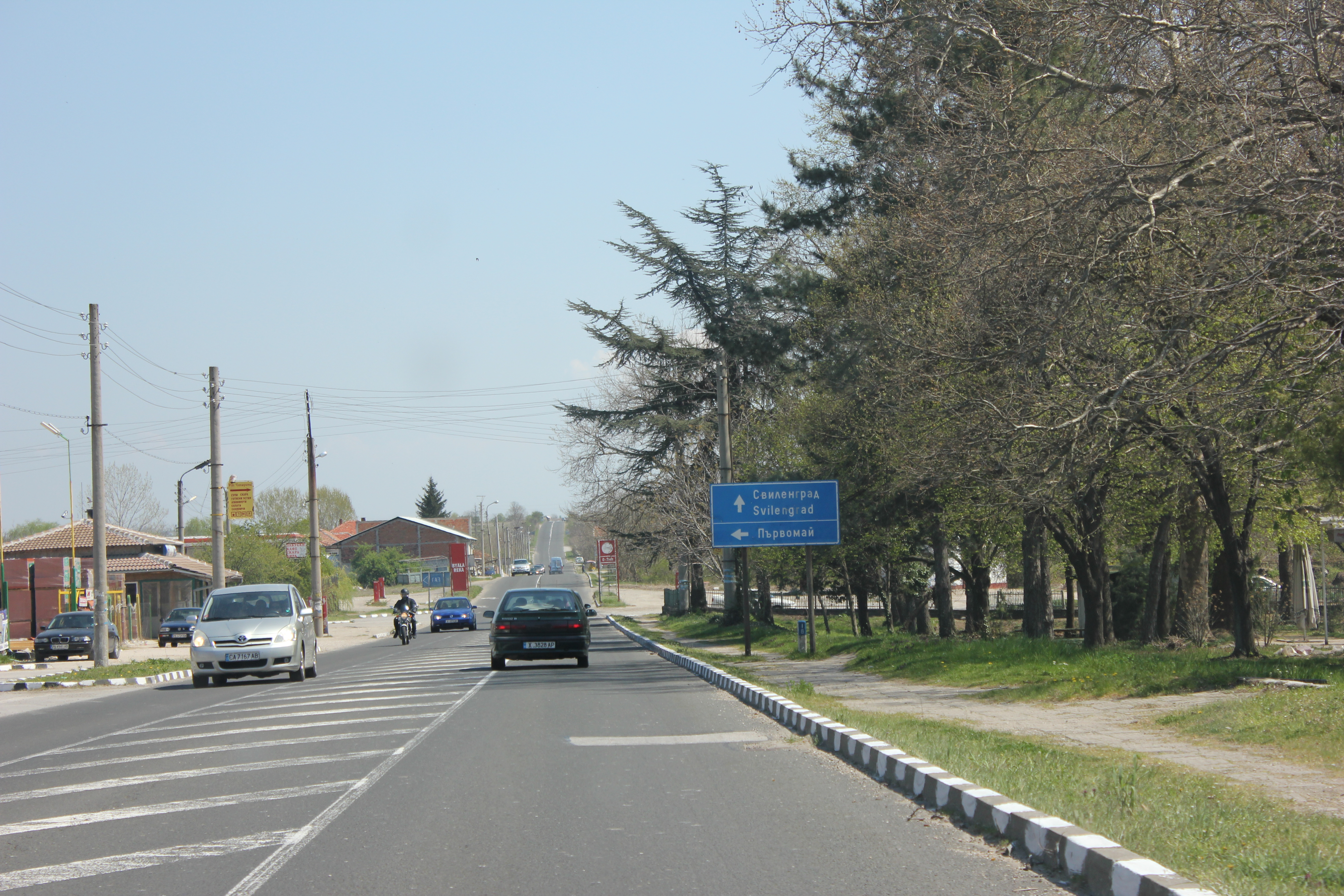
Byala Reka (Parvomay Municipality) main street

Parvomay Municipality (Bulgarian: Община Първомай) is a municipality in Plovdiv Province, Bulgaria, with administrative center Parvomay.

== General information ==
Parvomay Municipality is situated in the most Eastern area of the Plovdiv field – part of the Upper Thracian Plain, with total area of 864 m2. The Municipality encompasses 17 settlements with population in 2008 of 32 131 people. falling in 25,600 in 2011.

Settlement	Population (as of 31st December 2024)
Parvomay (administrative center)	10,973
Bryagovo	401
Byala Reka	532
Vinitsa	749
Voden	450
Gradina	1,898
Dobri dol	57
Dragoynovo	297
Dalbok Izvor	1,042
Iskra	1,042
Karadzhalovo	884
Krushevo	661
Bukovo	317
Poroyna	130
Pravoslaven	412
Tatarevo	411

== Geography ==
Two rivers run through its territory – the Maritsa river and the Mechka river. Valuable water resource are the thermal mineral springs in Dragoinovo, Biala Reka and Lenovo. The surroundings of Vinitsa village is the unique place in Bulgaria where Leucojum is to be found in the wild. The municipal center – Parvomay is situated at 134 meters above sea level. The surface of Municipality Parvomay is predominantly plain. Exceptions are the fields of the villages Voden and Bukovo and partially – those of Iskra, Briagovo, Dragoinovo and Ezerovo, which are situated in the frontier mountain Dragoina – part of the Rhodope Mountains, passing to the South-West into the Novakovski Balkan (mountain). The soils are predominantly black humus. There are also vast areas of cinnamon-forest type. In the lowland of the Maritsa river there are meadow–cinnamon soils. Meadow–alluvial soils are also to be found (the most fertile ones), as well as meadow–marsh ones. The territory of Municipality Parvomay belongs to the area of transitive Mediterranean climate. The average temperature in January is 1˚С, and about 25˚ С in July. The summer is dry and hot and the winter is comparatively mild. The snowfall is thin and not durable. The total precipitation is below the average for the country, about 532 L/m^{2}. The precipitation is highest in December and May and lowest in August and February–March. The relative humidity is particularly low – up to 60%. The strongest wind comes from the North-West, mainly in May and June, when it blows for weeks with average velocity of about 3 m/s. Thunderstorms and hailstorms are quite common in summer. Fogs happen along the Maritsa river but they are not common.

== Economy ==
In 2011, over 200,000 photovoltaic panels were constructed near to the village of Karadzhalovo to the east of Parvomay town to form, Karadzhalovo Solar Park.

Of crucial importance for Municipality Parvomay are the following enterprises:

Chugunoleene Invest 97 - the company activity is mainly production of cast iron and steam moulds for the brakes systems of railway carriages and locomotives, for the mill industry and non-ferrous metallurgy and the electric power industry; international transport, full and partial repair of cars, production of spare parts for cars, lorries, autobuses, tractors, locomotives, and carriages. The enterprise has a big potential for expansion of its production.

Poultry Slaughter-House - run by Deniz 2001 Ltd. with subject of activity – buy-up, processing and trade with poultry meat and products. The slaughter-house is up to the veterinary and sanitary requirements of the EU and has a certificate for export for the EU of water-birds products.

Iskra Ltd. - producer of passemanterie products: elastic cords, laces, embroideries, lasses, jacquard textile labels, edgings, etc., entirely oriented to the ready-made, knitwear and shoes industries.

Tailoring companies - there are about 100 tailoring companies on the municipal territory. Part of them produce for Belgium, Greece and Italy. The biggest one is "Alena R" AD.

Companies for production of plastic items - there are several companies producing polyethylene items. One of them is Ecoplast 99 Ltd., specialized in production or PE folio, gloves, bags, ice-moulds, plastic caps, etc. of HDPE and LDPE.

Canning industry - several companies produce ketchup, tomato and pepper pure, marmalade, sauces and different kinds of cans. The major ones are Bulcons Parvomay Ltd., Vital, Balabanov, Bogdanov and Partners Ltd.

Dairies - there are many dairies for milk processing and production of dairy products on the municipal territory – Bor-Chvor, Shipka 99.

The traditions in agriculture and the fertile soils are a prerequisite for the activities of many agricultural producers. The mail crops grown are: wheat (75000 decares), barley (7500 decares), corn - (8100 decares), sunflower (13200 decares), tobacco (Oriental - 2670.5 decares, large-leaves - 14600 decares, Burley - 1506 decares). The agricultural companies of major importance in the region are:

Greens Ltd. - famous on the home and the international market with production of early cucumbers. The company has 250 decares of glass hot-houses and uses natural gas for fuel.

Zagrei AD - the company cultivates 1000 decares of vines. The investment program of the company includes building of Winery Zagrei with capacity of 1000 tons annual production. The technological and architectural projects include building of a purifying and tank premises using for fuel the dried vine clusters and other agricultural waste products.

The major foreign investors in Municipality Parvomay are:

Shipka 99 – an enterprise for milk processing and production of all kinds of dairy products. Its owner is a private Lebanon company.

Zhuvim - BG Ltd. – owner is Didie George Jozef Gutals, Belgium. The company activity is sewing on order.

ADF – Bulgaria – owner is the French consortium ADF. The company activity is wool processing.

The municipal territory is run through by a high-speed railway road.

Gas-Supply Parvomay Ltd is the first gas company within the structure of Overgas Holding AD and in Bulgaria. Since its foundation in 1992 the company undertook the challenge to work in a fast developing private company and for the affirmation of a modern and perspective gas philosophy in Bulgaria. The total lineal part for the whole system is 35151 m. The company supplies nature gas by sectors and consumers as follows: 16 consumers in the industrial sector(95% of the total number of enterprises); 21 consumers in the social sector; 112 households. It is planned to supply more than 2000 households with this economic and convenient fuel.

Gazosnabdyavane Parvomay – Overgas subsidiary in Parvomay, started supplying blue fuel to the new tobacco-processing workshop of the Greek Tobacco Leaf House OOD. The new industrial customer is to use 252,000 m^{3} of natural gas a year.

The Dutch BM Greenhouses in the town switched to natural gas in 2007. Using 300,000 m^{3} a year.

It is the access to natural gas that has prompted the start-up of 23 new enterprises in Parvomay in the last few years.

As of 2007 the gas distribution grid in the municipality tops 47 km. 300 households and 32 commercial customers in the town are already using natural gas. The French tobacco-processing ADF, Parvomay BG and the Bulcons-Parvomay cannery are among them.

Gazosnabdyavane Parvomay delivered to its customers a total of 5,996,000 cubic metres in 2006. Parvomays company EcoGas supplies engineering services to the local Gas, heating, water and Tobacco industries, the company is also the regular sponsor of the Towns Rock Festival.

The international road Е-80 passes through the town of Parvomay and highway Trakia passes very near. The A3 motorway is under construction (2011) and will boost the local economy linking Turkey to Parvomay and Plovdiv with better quality road network.

== Demography ==
=== Religion ===
According to the latest Bulgarian census of 2011, the religious composition, among those who answered the optional question on religious identification, was the following:

Religious composition of Parvomay Municipality
Orthodox Christianity	85.3%
Catholicism	0.3%
Protestantism	1.1%
Islam	7.5%
No religion	1.7%
Prefer not to answer, others and indefinable	4.1%

== Archeology ==
In 2015, archaeologists discovered a 1st century AD Greek inscription printed on a clay vessel at an excavation in the town of Tatarevo. The vessel was a balsamarium (an ancient vessel for holding balsam), and has been found inside a grave. The inscription was a verse from the poem “Prayer to the Muses" by Solon.
