= Lisets (mountain) =

Mountain range in Bulgaria

- Location within Bulgaria

Highest point
- Elevation: 1,500 m (4,900 ft)
- Coordinates: 42°17′24″N 22°34′16.5″E

Naming
- Native name: Лисец (Bulgarian)

Geography
- Location: Bulgaria

Lisets (Bulgarian: Лисец) is a mountain range in Kraishte region in western Bulgaria. It is part of the Milevska–Konyavska mountain chain system.

Lisets is located between the Kyustendil Valley in the east and the Kamenitsa Valley in the west. To the north, the gorge the river Sovolyanska Bistritsa separates it from the Chudinska planina and to the south, through the Vratsa saddle (995 m), it is connected to the Osogovo mountain range. It has a dome shape with a diameter of about 13–14 km. In its middle rises the highest point, the summit of Vrashnik (1,500 m). Other prominent summits include Kostobia (1,264 m), Srednia Chukar (1,210 m) and Machi baba (1,036 m). The eastern slopes facing the Kyustendil Valley and are slant, while those to the west towards the Kamenitsa Valley and to the north towards the Sovolyanska Bistritsa Valley are steep.

The mountain range is formed by crystalline schists. The climate is transitional continental with Alpine influence. Most of Lisets is drained by the Sovolyanska Bistritsa, a right tributary of the river Struma.

The predominant soils are cinnamon forest soils. Lisets is covered with deciduous forests, dominated by mixed European beech (Fagus sylvatica) and sessile oak (Quercus petraea).

In the mountain range and on its slopes are located the villages of Blatets, Dozhdevitsa, Leska and Lisets, and along its slopes are Radlovtsi, Lozno, Gorna Brestnitsa and Vratsa.

In direction west–east along the Vratsa Pass on the southern foothills of Lisets passes a 3.2 km section of the first class I-6 road Gyueshevo–Sofia–Karlovo–Burgas. Along the gorge of the Sovolyanska Bistritsa on its northeastern, northern and northwestern slopes between Sovolyano and Dolno Selo passes a section of railway line No. 6 Sofia–Pernik–Kyustendil–Gyueshevo served by the Bulgarian State Railways.
