= Dragovištica =

Dragovištica/Dragovishtitsa (Драговищица)
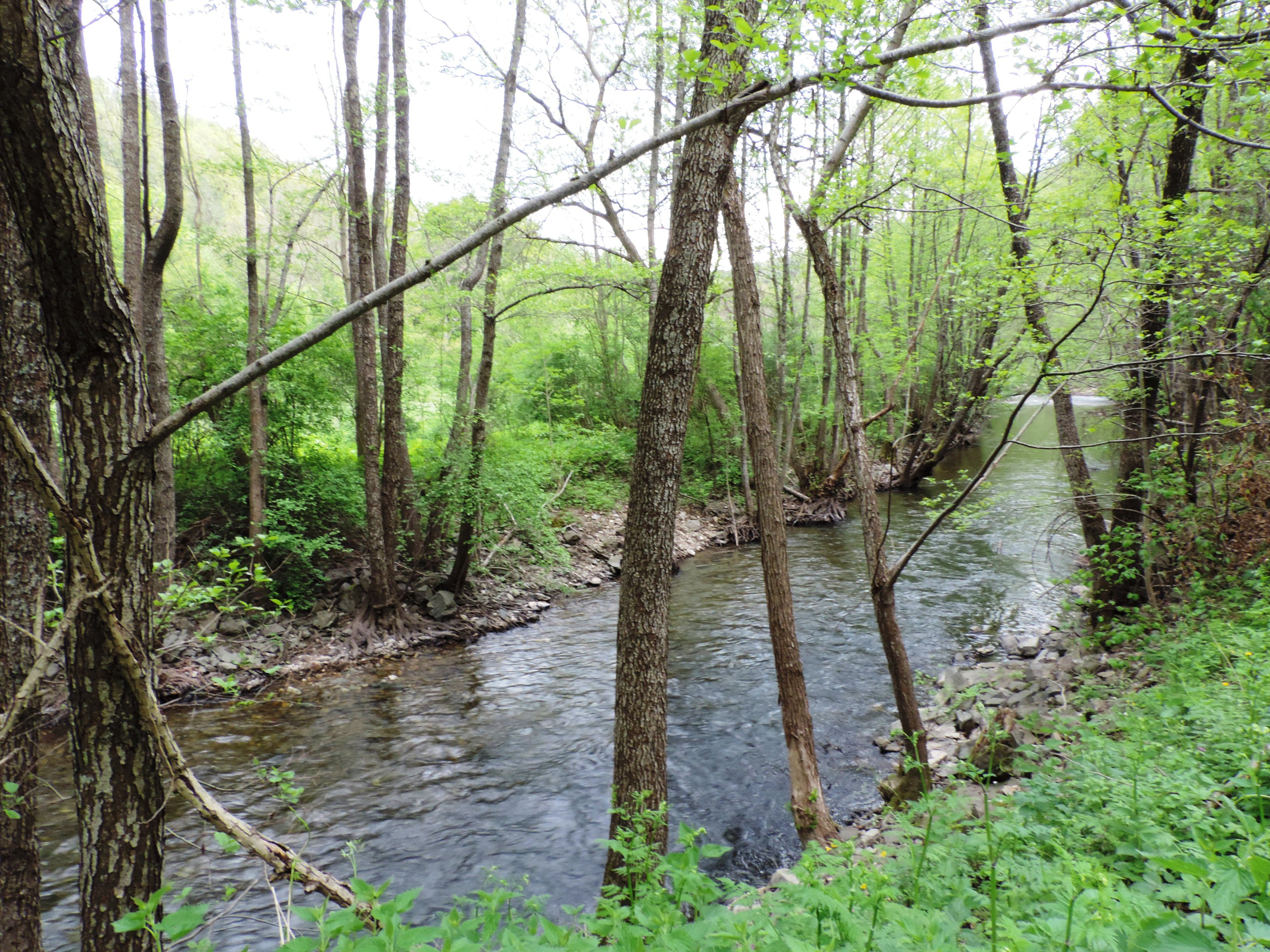
- Dragovishtitsa in Bulgaria

Location
- Country: Bulgaria, Serbia

Physical characteristics
- Source
  - location: Bosilegrad, Serbia, from the Božička reka and the Ljubatska reka
  - elevation: 787 m (2,582 ft)
- Mouth
  - location: Struma, north of Kyustendil, Bulgaria
  - coordinates: 42°21′57″N 22°43′09″E
  - elevation: 485 m (1,591 ft)
- Length: 63 km (39 mi)
- Basin size: 867 km^{2}

Basin features
- Progression: Struma→ Aegean Sea

The Dragovištica or Dragovishtitsa (Serbian Cyrillic: Драговиштица; Bulgarian: Драговищица) is a river in southeastern Serbia and western Bulgaria, a 63 km-long right tributary to the River Struma. Its drainage basin covers a territory of 867 km^{2}. The river belongs to the Aegean Sea drainage and is not navigable.

== Course ==
=== Serbia ===
The Dragovištica is formed by the confluence of the Božička reka (its longer headstream) and the Ljubatska reka at the small town of Bosilegrad in the southeastern part of Serbia, at an altitude of 787 m.

==== Božička reka ====
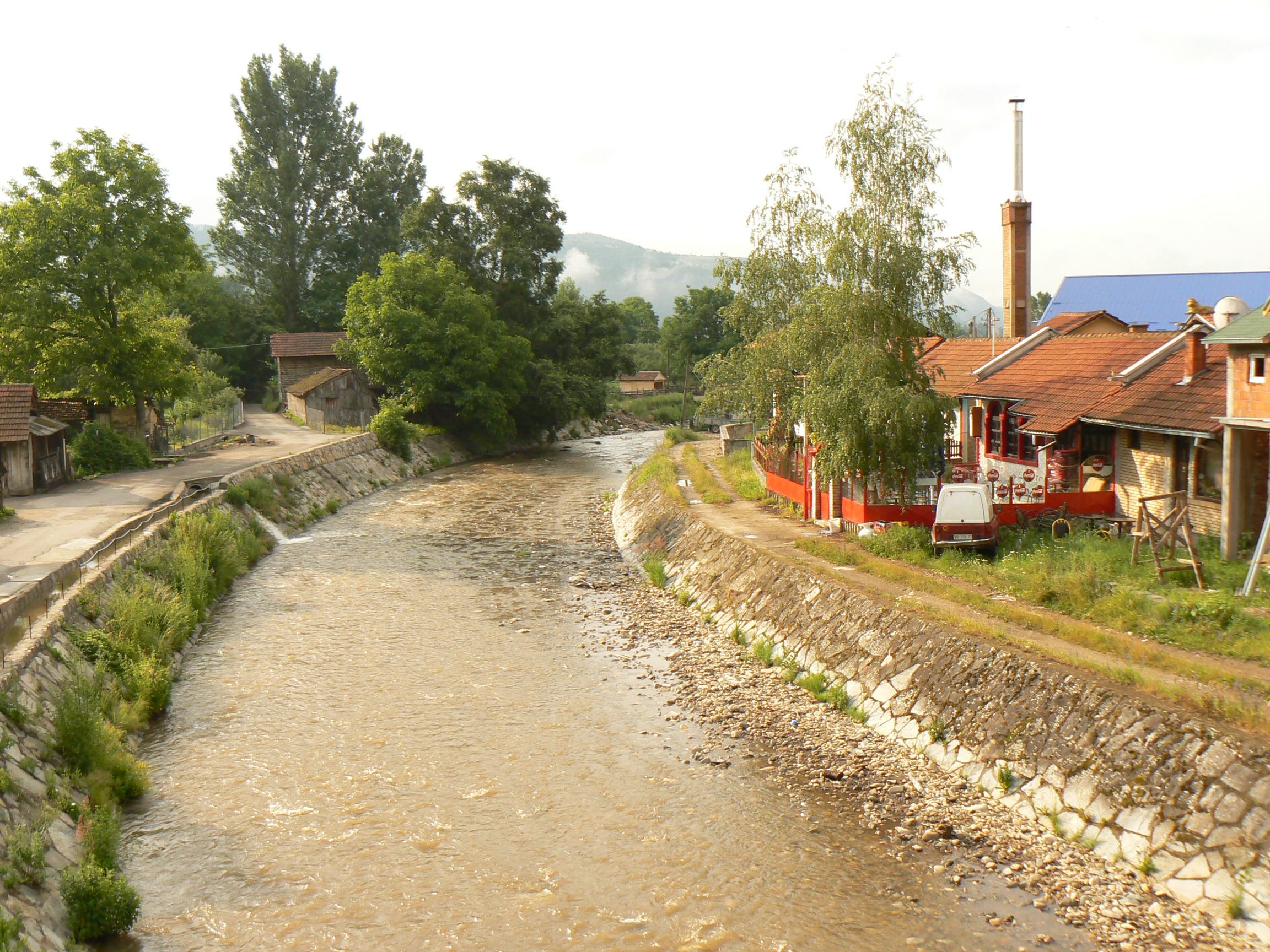
Božička River passing through Bosilegrad, Serbia

The Božička reka (Cyrillic: Божичка река) originates in the region of Krajište, between Lake Vlasina to the west and the Bulgarian border to the east, just a few kilometers from the source of another Serbian-Bulgarian river, the Jerma. However, while Jerma flows northward, the Mutnica (Cyrillic: Мутница), as the Božička reka is initially named, flows to the south, between the mountains of Vardenik (to the west) and Milevska planina (to the east). From the village of Božica on the river is known as the Božička reka ("river of Božica"). It receives the Lisina river from the right at the village of Donja Lisina and continues south to Bosilegrad, where it meets the Ljubatska reka. At Donja Lisina, the Božička reka is dammed, creating an artificial Lisina lake, used as an auxiliary reservoir for the Vrla hydro electrical power plants on the Vlasina River.

==== Ljubatska reka ====
The Ljubatska reka (Cyrillic: Љубатска река) also originates in the Krajište region, but from its southwestern side, from the Besna Kobila mountain near the village of Musut. The river flows through the northern slopes of the Dukat, next to the villages of Gornja Ljubata and Donja Ljubata, before it reaches Bosilegrad.

The river slowly turns southeast after Bosilegrad, now flowing between the northern slopes of the Milevska planina to the north and the Dukat mountain to the west. After it passes next to the villages of Rajčilovci, Radičevci and Resen, it receives from the right the Brankovačka reka precisely on the Serbian-Bulgarian border, and enters Bulgaria.

=== Bulgaria ===
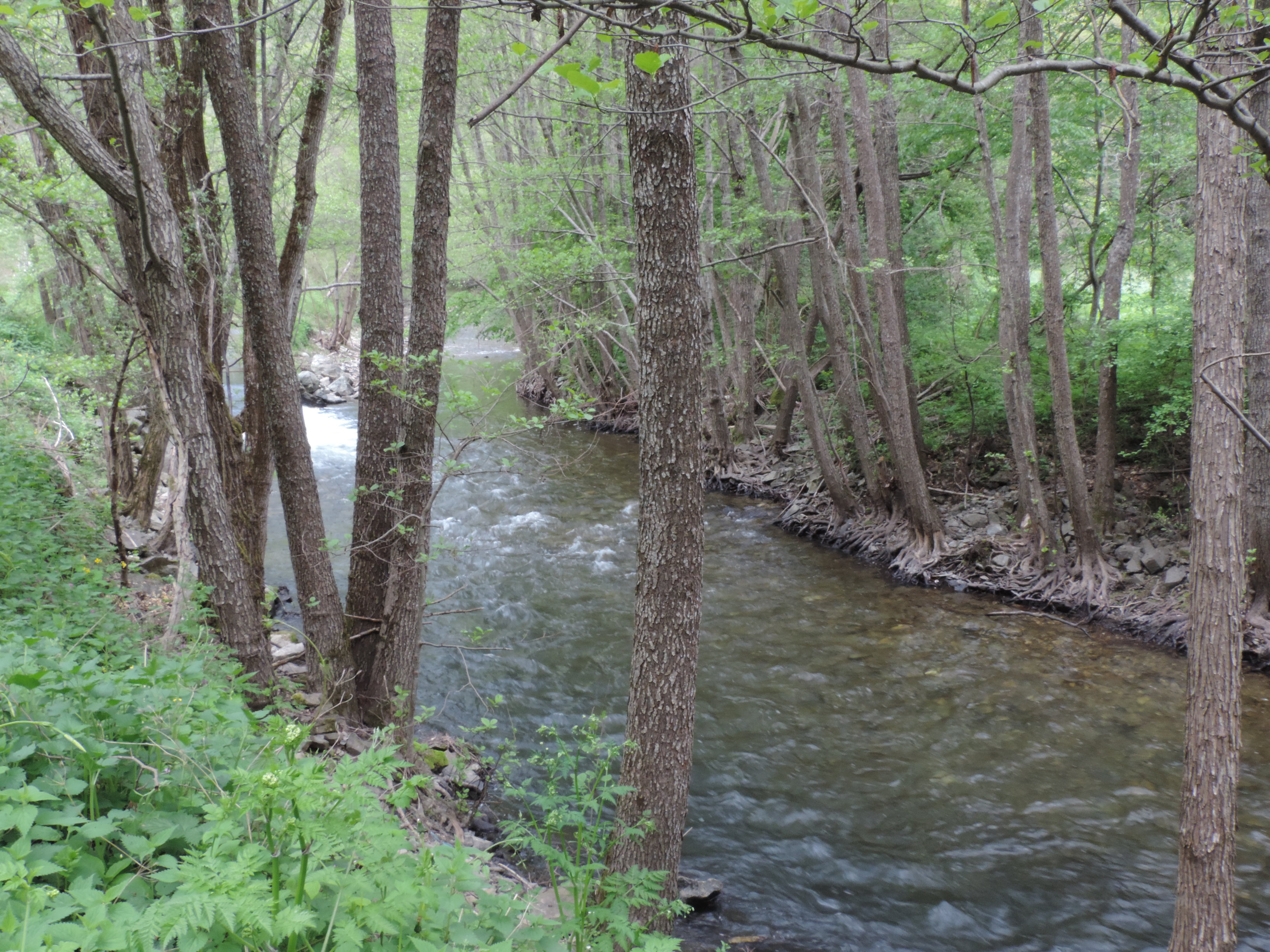
Dragovishtitsa River between villages Dolno Uyno and Goranovtsi, Bulgaria

Immediately after the border and the village of Dolno Uyno, the Dragovishtitsa enters the Kyustendil depression, part of the Struma river valley. The river flows through the southern slopes of the Zemenska planina mountain and through the dual village of Dragovishtitsa (consisting of two villages, Perivol on the right bank and Yamborano on the left bank of the river). Soon after, the river empties into the Struma at an altitude of 485 m near the villages of Razhdavitsa and Shipochano north-northeast of the city of Kyustendil.
