= Dragovishtitsa =

Dragovishtitsa may refer to:

- The Dragovištica (Serbian Cyrillic: Драговиштица) or Dragovishtitsa (Bulgarian Cyrillic: Драговищица) - a river in southeastern Serbia and western Bulgaria, and a tributary of the Struma river
- One of two villages in Bulgaria:
  - Dragovishtitsa, Kyustendil Province - a village in the Kyustendil municipality, Kyustendil province
  - Dragovishtitsa, Sofia Province - a village in the Kostinbrod municipality, Sofia province
