= Kopilovtsi =

Kopilovtsi (Cyrillic: Копиловци) may refer to the following places in Bulgaria:

- Kopilovtsi, Kyustendil Province, a village in Kyustendil municipality
- Kopilovtsi, Montana Province, a village in Georgi Damyanovo municipality
