= Mazarachevo =

Mazarchevo Мазарачево
- Village
- Location within Bulgaria
- Coordinates: 42.3500°N 22.6219°E
- Country: Bulgaria
- Province: Kyustendil Province
- Municipality: Kyustendil

Population (2011)
  - Total: ▼66
- Time zone: UTC+2 (EET)
  - Summer (DST): UTC+3 (EEST)

Mazarchevo is a village in Kyustendil Municipality, Kyustendil Province, south-western Bulgaria.

== Population ==
The village of Mazarchevo is losing many inhabitants due to emigration and a negative natural growth rate.

Year	1880	1900	1920	1934	1946	1956	1965	1975	1985	1992	2001	2011
Population	▲567	▲771	▲869	▲990	▲1,025 (maximum)	▼813	▼504	▼273	▼181	▼167	▼116	▼66

As of February 2011, there are no inhabitants aged under 30. However, there are 13 people aged 80 years or more. The village is quite old: the median age is about seventy years old.
