= Katrishte =

Katrishte Катрище
- Village
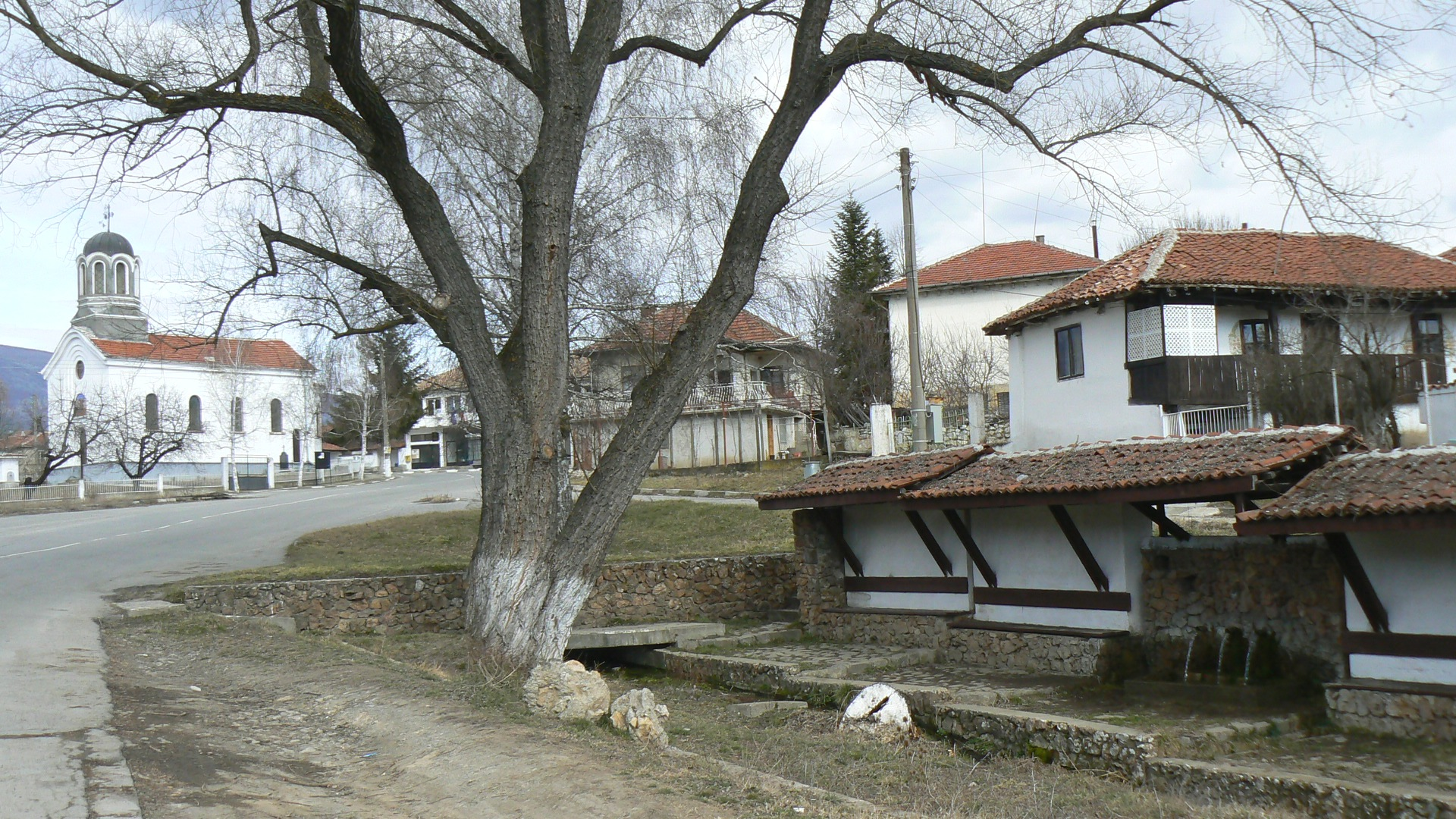
- The water tap in the centre of village Katrishte (Bulgaria) and the church "Saint Dimiter"

- Location within Bulgaria
- Coordinates: 42.2833°N 22.8333°E
- Country: Bulgaria
- Province: Kyustendil Province
- Municipality: Kyustendil
- Time zone: UTC+2 (EET)
  - Summer (DST): UTC+3 (EEST)

Katrishte is a village in Kyustendil Municipality, Kyustendil Province, south-western Bulgaria.
