= Novo Selo, Kyustendil Province =

Novo Selo Ново село
- Village
- Location within Bulgaria
- Country: Bulgaria
- Province: Kyustendil Province
- Municipality: Kyustendil
- Time zone: UTC+2 (EET)
  - Summer (DST): UTC+3 (EEST)

Novo Selo is a village in Kyustendil Municipality, Kyustendil Province, south-western Bulgaria. The etymology of the village comes from Slavic languages meaning new village, Novo Selo.
