= Sovolyano =

Sovolyano Соволяно
- Village
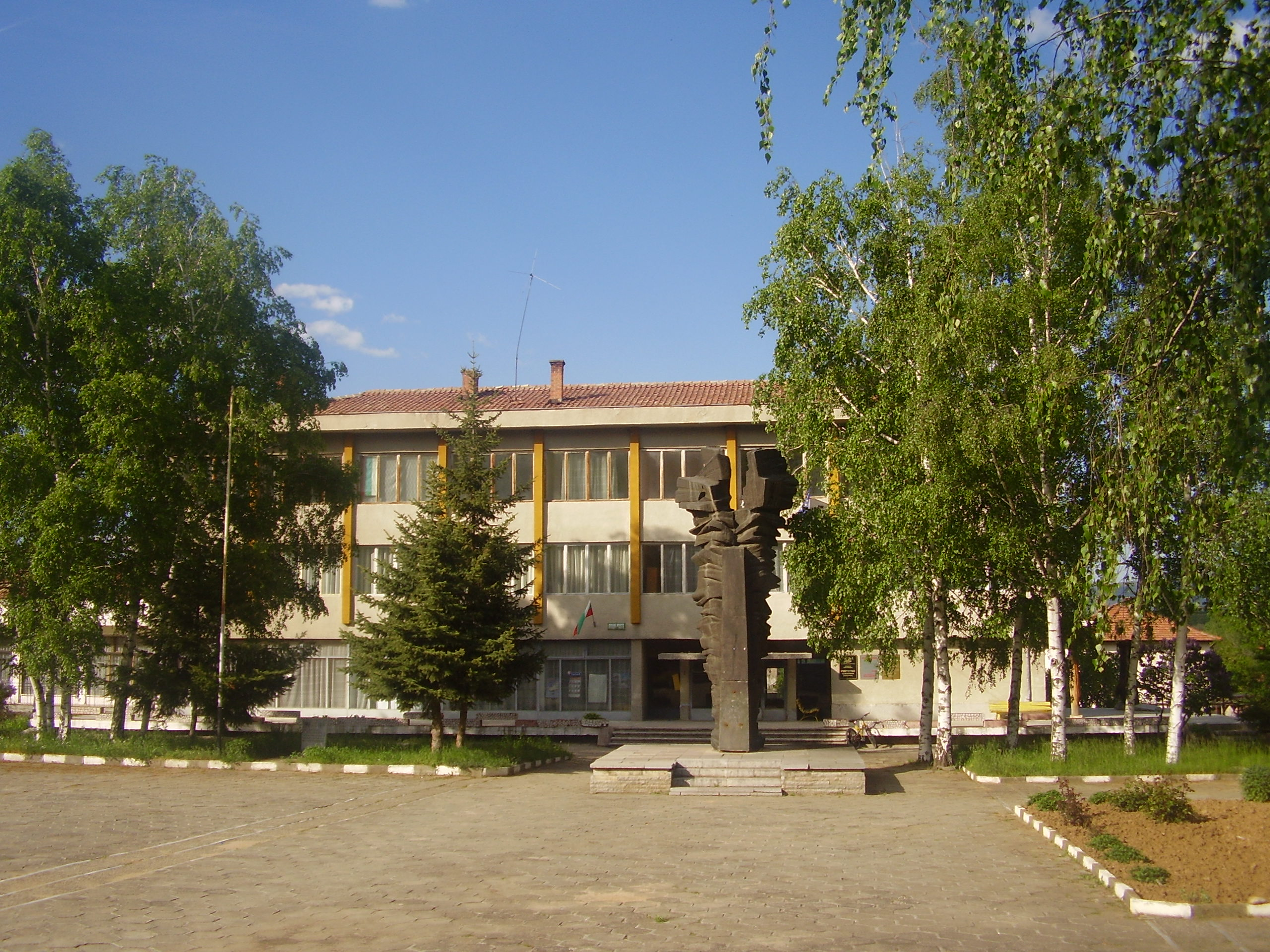
- In front of a sculpture in Sovolyano

- Location within Bulgaria
- Coordinates: 42.3308°N 22.6603°E
- Country: Bulgaria
- Province: Kyustendil Province
- Municipality: Kyustendil
- Time zone: UTC+2 (EET)
  - Summer (DST): UTC+3 (EEST)

Sovolyano is a village in Kyustendil Municipality, Kyustendil Province, south-western Bulgaria.

St. Theodore Tiron Church, located in the center of the village, is from the period of the Bulgarian Revival. Built in 1834 on the foundations of an older temple. It is a single-nave, single-apse building, dug into the ground on three steps.

St. Athanasius Church is located in the northern end of the village, on the left of the road to the village of Dragovishtitsa. Built in 1885. It is partially frescoed, a carved iconostasis and icons were installed in 1897.

== Gallery ==
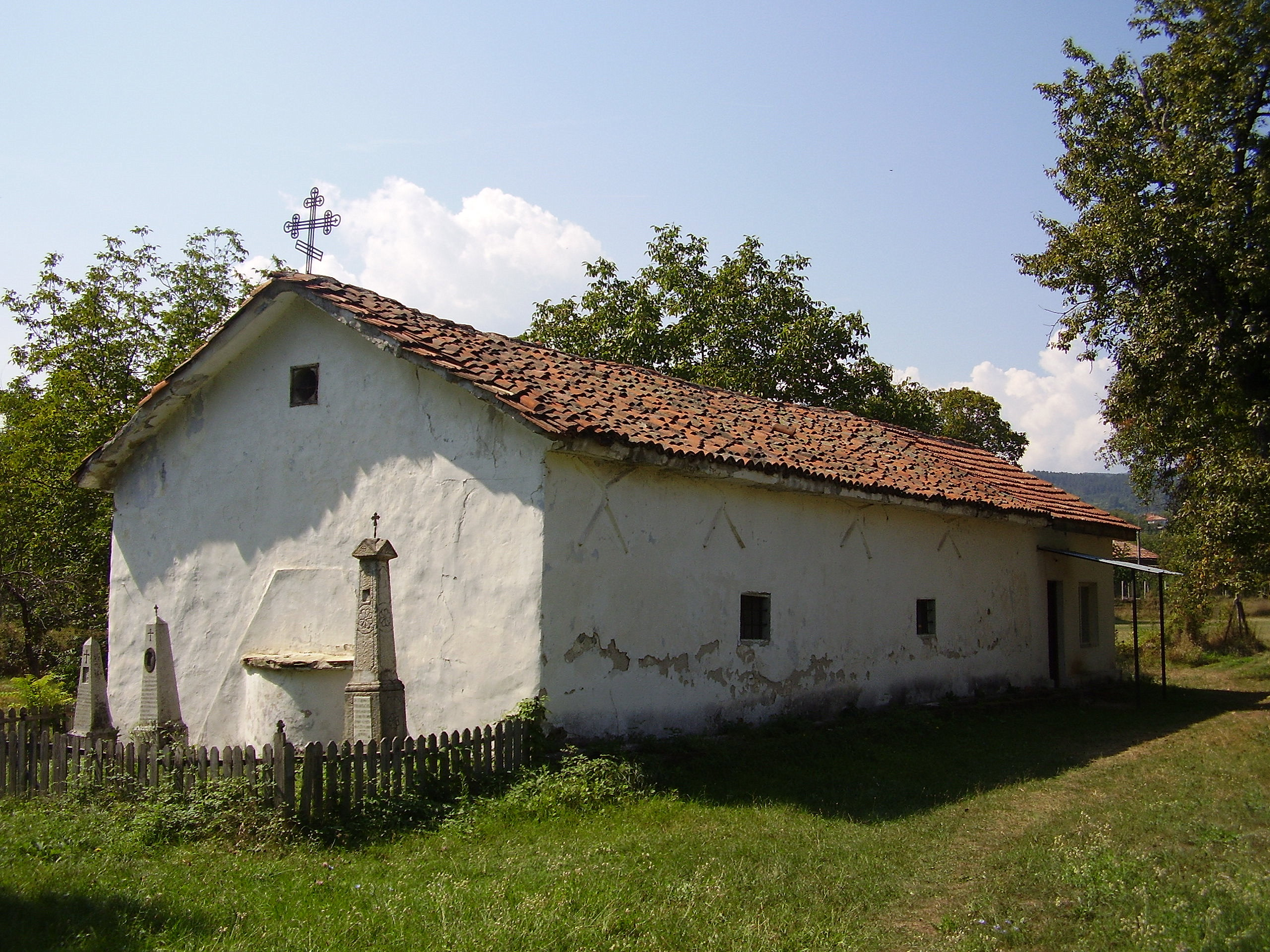
Church of Saint Theodore of Amasea

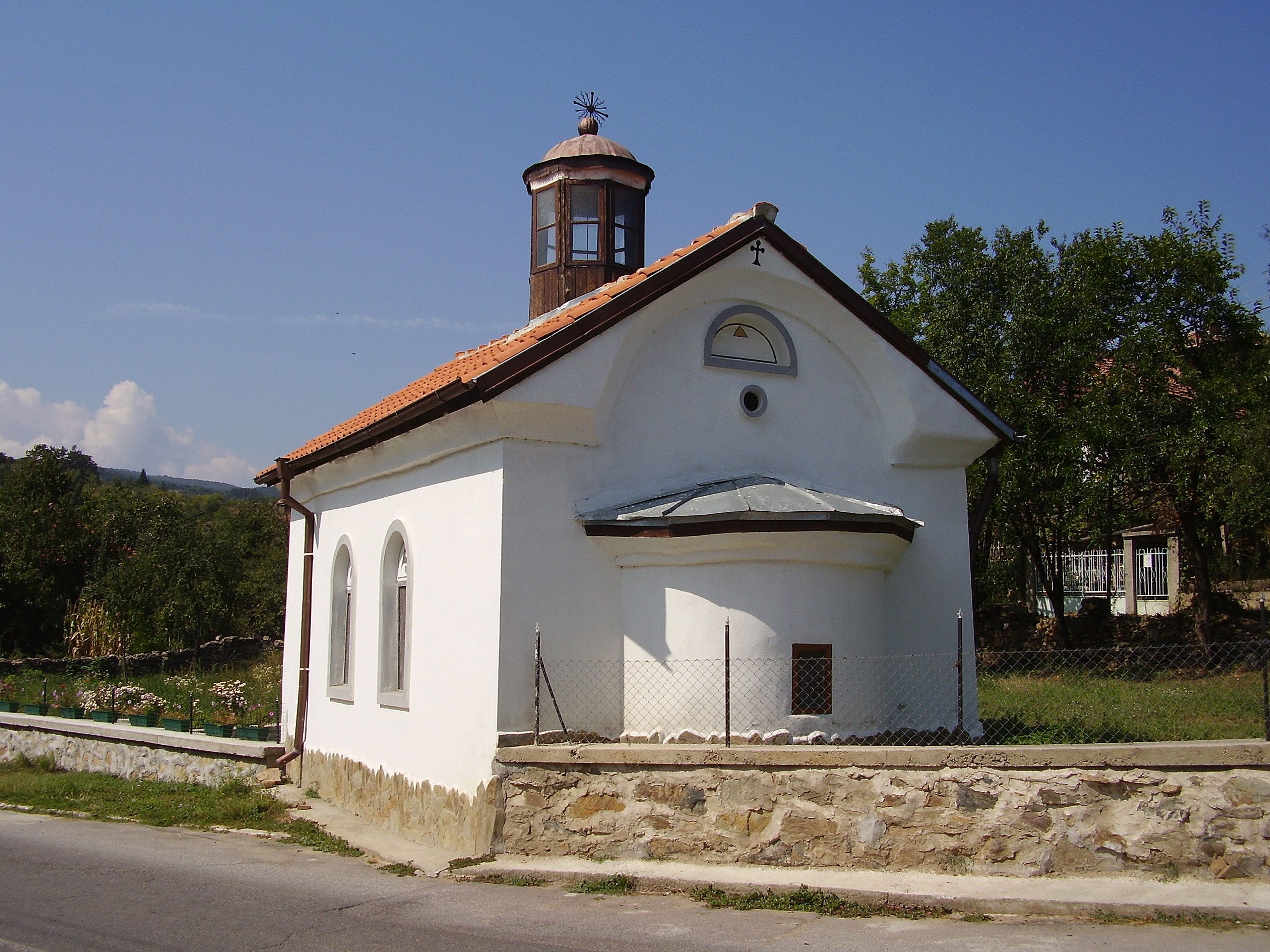
Church of Saint Athanasius

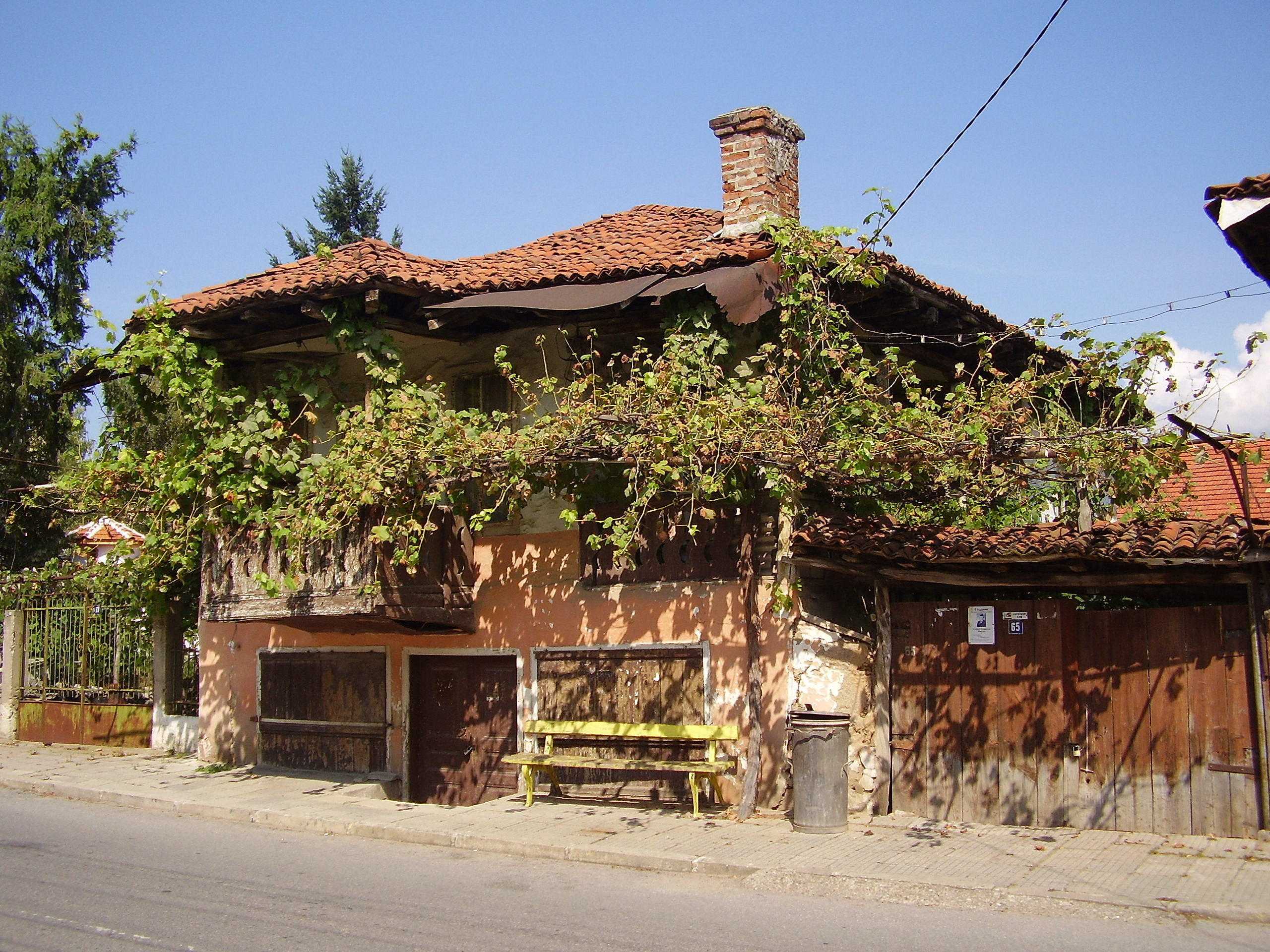
Country house
