= Bersin =

Bersin Берсин
- Village
- Location within Bulgaria
- Coordinates: 42.2444°N 22.7769°E
- Country: Bulgaria
- Province: Kyustendil Province
- Municipality: Kyustendil
- Time zone: UTC+2 (EET)
  - Summer (DST): UTC+3 (EEST)

Bersin is a village in Kyustendil Municipality, Kyustendil Province, south-western Bulgaria.

== See also ==
- Alan Bersin (born 1946), American lawyer, President Obama's "Border Czar", US Attorney for the Southern District of California, California Secretary of Education, Commissioner of US Customs and Border Protection, US Department of Homeland Security Secretary for International Affairs, and INTERPOL vice president
