= Yabalkovo, Kyustendil Province =

Yabalkovo Ябълково
- Village
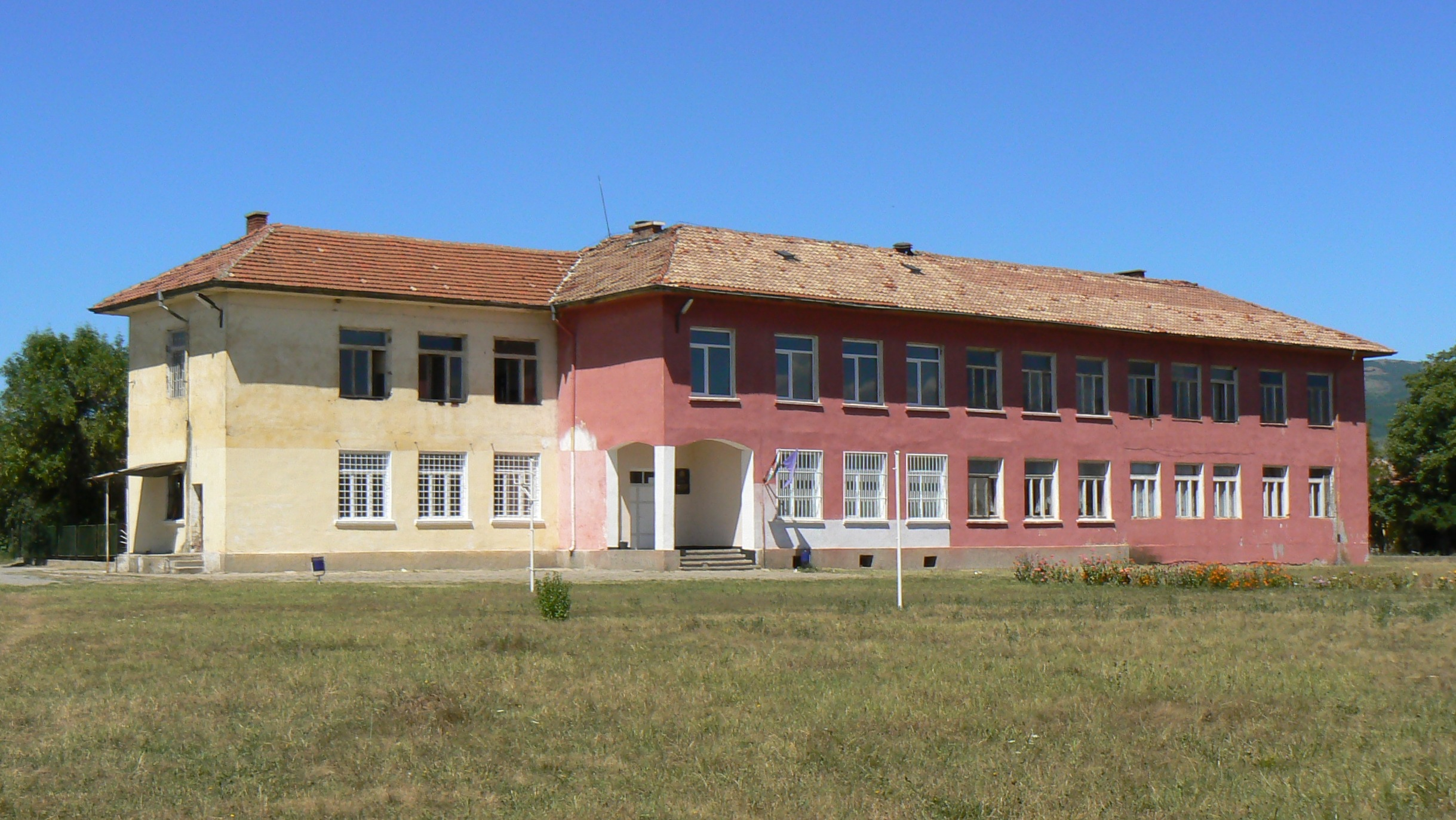
- The mayor's office and the school in Yabalkovo

- Location within Bulgaria
- Coordinates: 42.3167°N 22.7500°E
- Country: Bulgaria
- Province: Kyustendil Province
- Municipality: Kyustendil
- Time zone: UTC+2 (EET)
  - Summer (DST): UTC+3 (EEST)

Yabalkovo is a village in Kyustendil Municipality, Kyustendil Province, south-western Bulgaria.
