= Sazhdenik =

Sazhdenik Сажденик
- Village
- Location within Bulgaria
- Coordinates: 42.1333°N 22.5833°E
- Country: Bulgaria
- Province: Kyustendil Province
- Municipality: Kyustendil
- Elevation: 1,185 m (3,888 ft)

Population
  - Total: 5 (official data: 15.12.2021)
- Time zone: UTC+2 (EET)
  - Summer (DST): UTC+3 (EEST)
- Postal code: 2576
- Area code: 078

Sazhdenik is a village in Kyustendil Municipality, Kyustendil Province, south-western Bulgaria. Located is at southern slopes at Osogowska mountain (Осоговска планина).
