= Slokostitsa =

Slokoshtitsa Слокощица
- Village
- Location within Bulgaria
- Coordinates: 42.2667°N 22.7072°E
- Country: Bulgaria
- Province: Kyustendil Province
- Municipality: Kyustendil
- Time zone: UTC+2 (EET)
  - Summer (DST): UTC+3 (EEST)

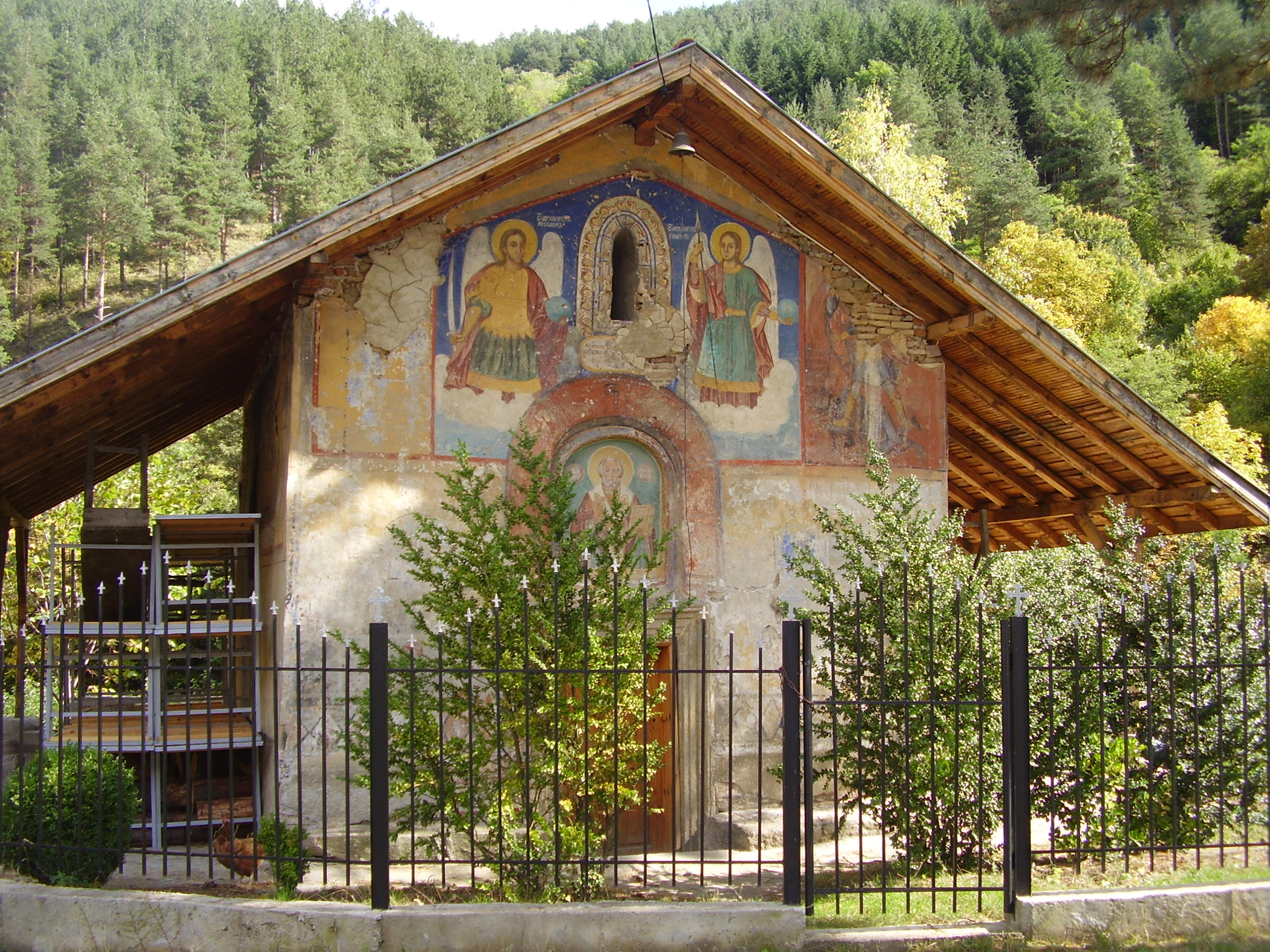
A church in Slokoshtitsa

Slokoshtitsa is a village in Kyustendil Municipality, Kyustendil Province, south-western Bulgaria.
