= Kamenichka Skakavitsa =

Kamenichka Skakavitsa Каменичка Скакавица
- Village
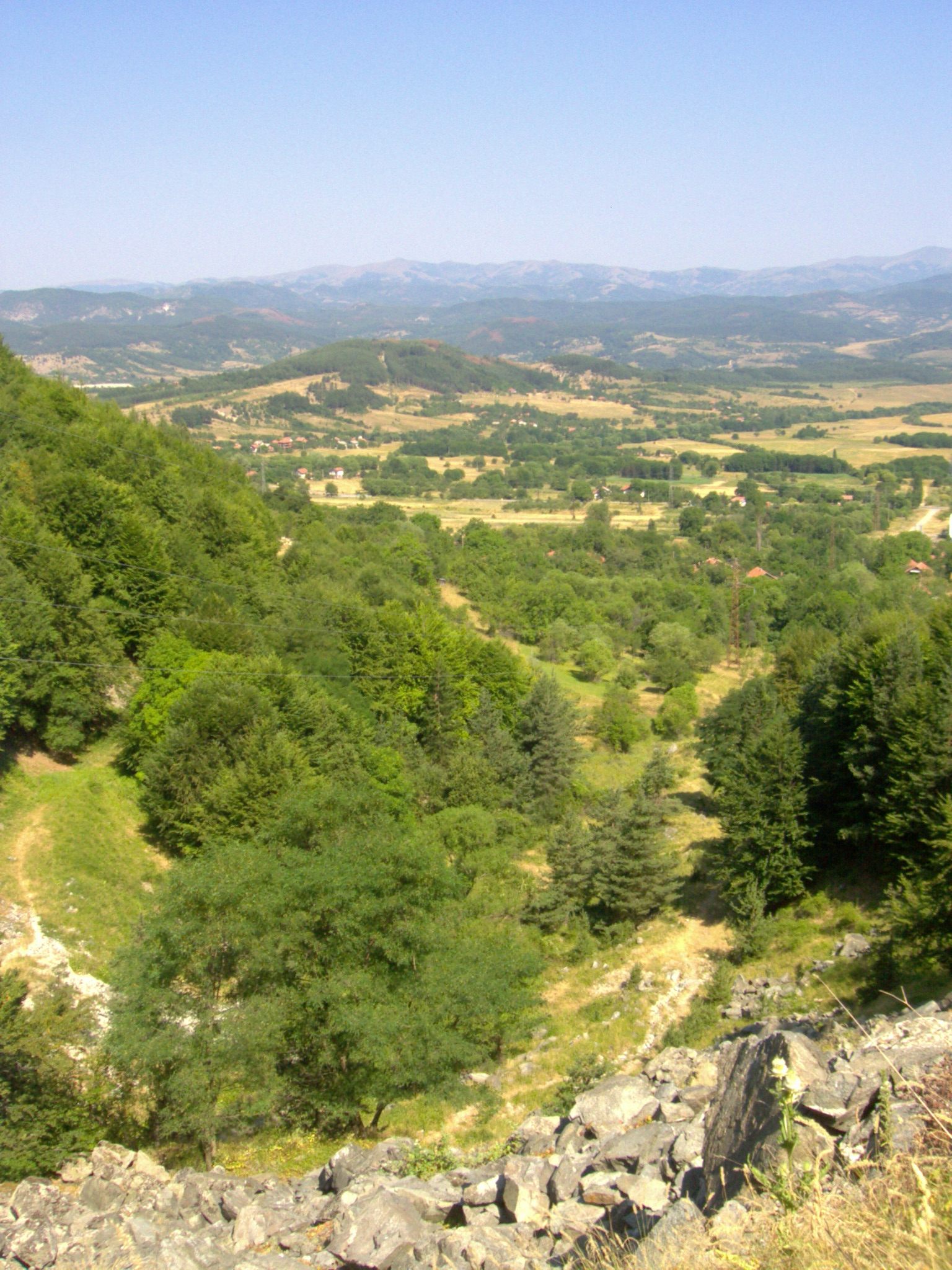
- View of the village: Kamenichka Skakavitsa, Bulgaria

- Location within Bulgaria
- Coordinates: 42.2358°N 22.5131°E
- Country: Bulgaria
- Province: Kyustendil Province
- Municipality: Kyustendil
- Time zone: UTC+2 (EET)
  - Summer (DST): UTC+3 (EEST)

Kamenichka Skakavitsa is a village in Kyustendil Municipality, Kyustendil Province, south-western Bulgaria.
