= Polska Skakavitsa =

Polska Skakavitsa Полска Скакавица
- Village
- Location within Bulgaria
- Coordinates: 42.4183°N 22.6553°E
- Country: Bulgaria
- Province: Kyustendil Province
- Municipality: Kyustendil

Population
  - Total: 17
- Time zone: UTC+2 (EET)
  - Summer (DST): UTC+3 (EEST)
- Postal code: 2551

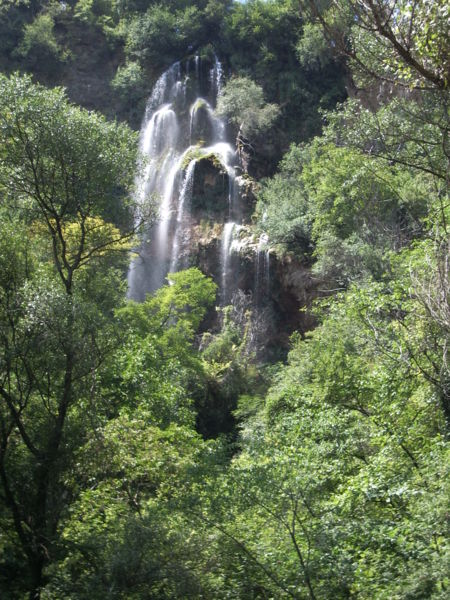
Polska Skakavitsa Waterfall

Polska Skakavitsa is a village in Kyustendil Municipality, Kyustendil Province, south-western Bulgaria.

== History ==
The remains of a Thracian necropolis, a medieval settlement and medieval and late medieval churches testify that the area has been inhabited since ancient times.

Once a village of 700 the population has decreased rapidly as more people move to industrialized areas to find jobs.

The village was electrified in 1956.

== Natural Attractions ==
Polska Skakavitsa is famed in Bulgaria for the nearby waterfall that drops water from 50m high.
