= Bobeshino =

Bobeshino Бобешино
- Village
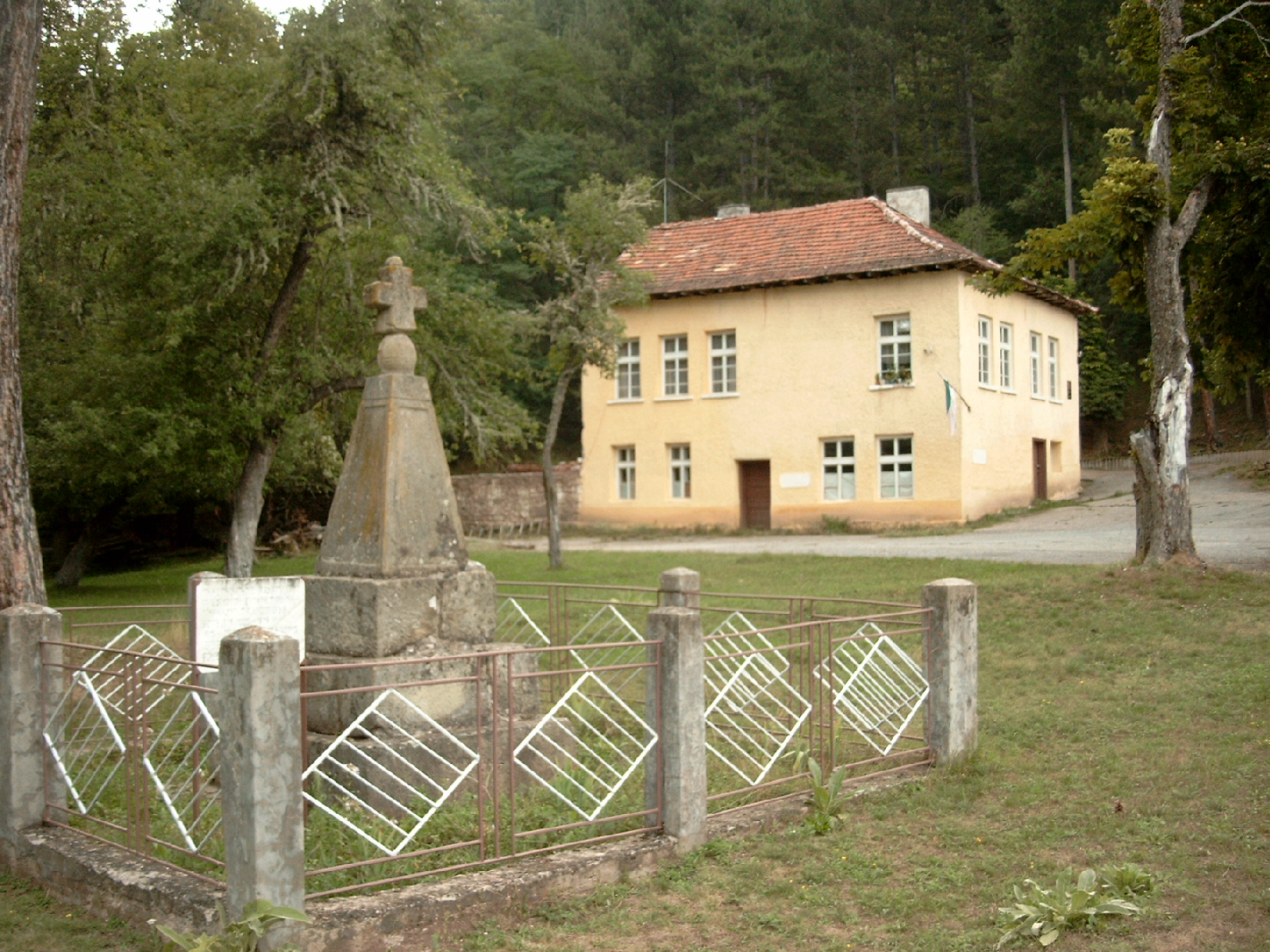
- Manor in Bobeshino

- Location within Bulgaria
- Coordinates: 42.3131°N 22.4244°E
- Country: Bulgaria
- Province: Kyustendil Province
- Municipality: Kyustendil
- Time zone: UTC+2 (EET)
  - Summer (DST): UTC+3 (EEST)

Bobeshino is a village in Kyustendil Municipality, Kyustendil Province, south-western Bulgaria.
