= Goranovtsi, Kyustendil Province =

Goranovtsi Горановци
- Village
- Location within Bulgaria
- Coordinates: 42.3864°N 22.6289°E
- Country: Bulgaria
- Province: Kyustendil Province
- Municipality: Kyustendil
- Time zone: UTC+2 (EET)
  - Summer (DST): UTC+3 (EEST)

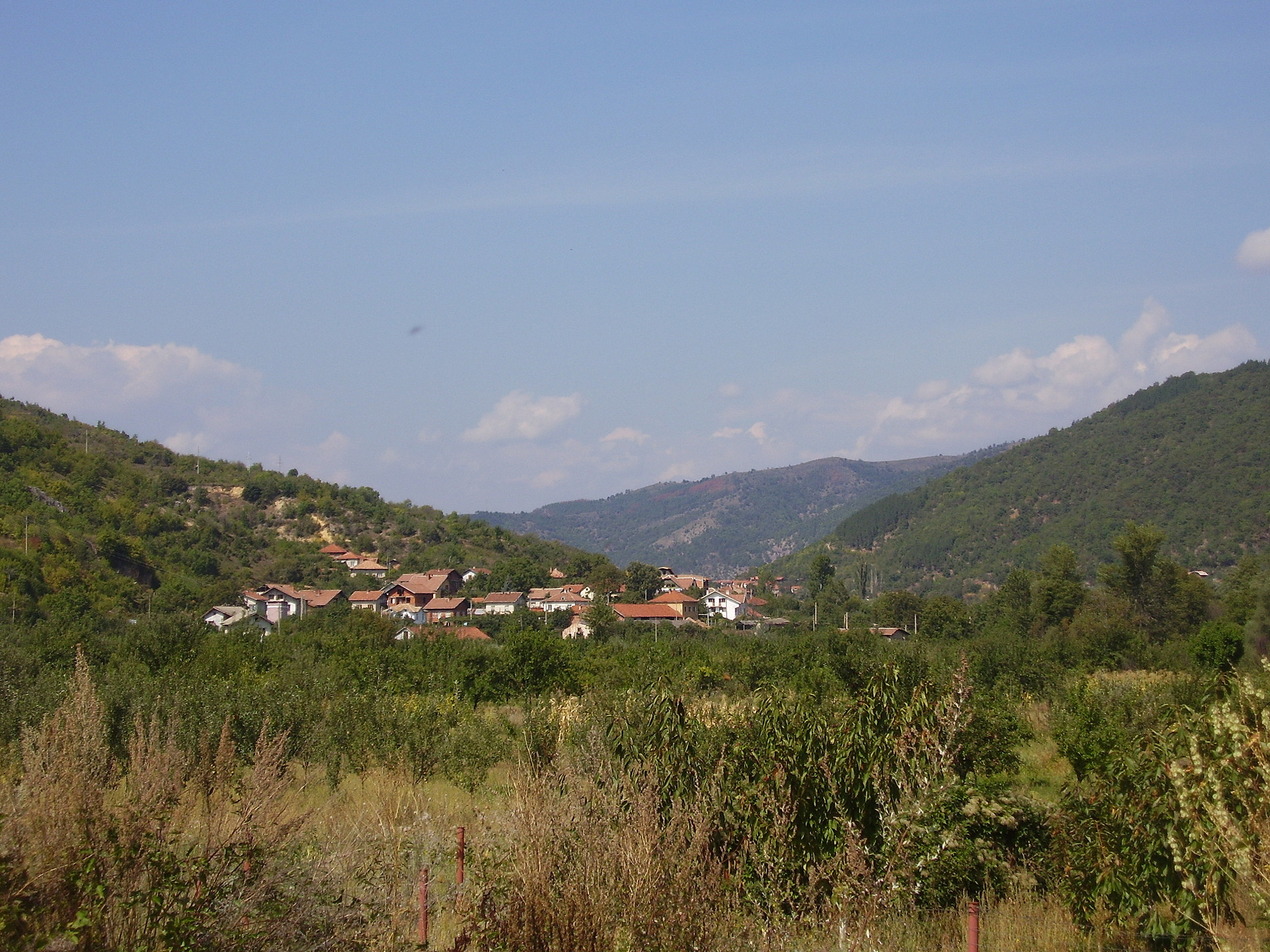
Goranovtsi

Goranovtsi is a village in Kyustendil Municipality, Kyustendil Province, south-western Bulgaria. It had a population of 82 people as of 2013.
