= Gorno Uyno =

Gorno Uyno Горно Уйно
- Village
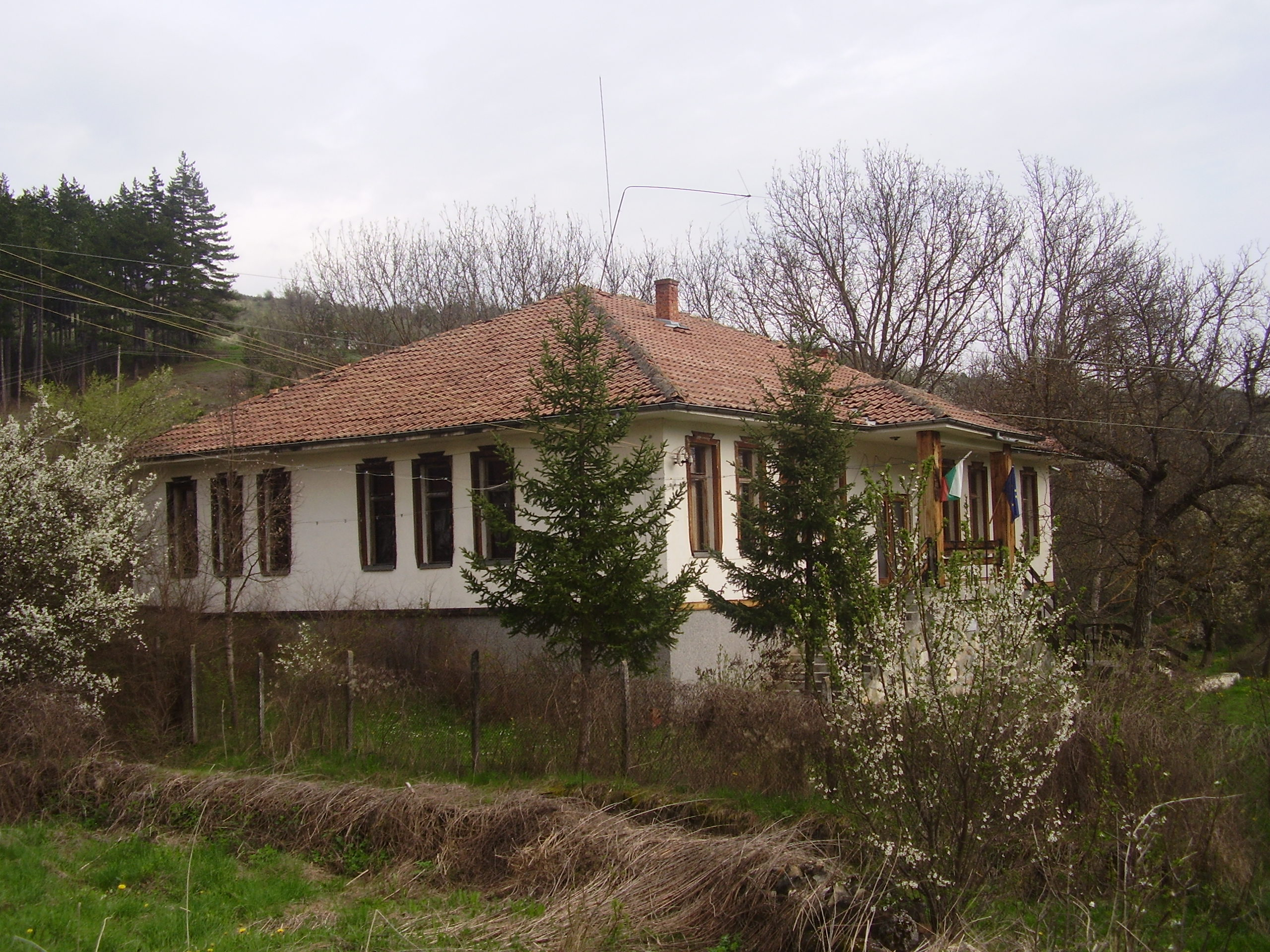
- Manor in Gorno Uyno

- Location within Bulgaria
- Coordinates: 42.4517°N 22.5728°E
- Country: Bulgaria
- Province: Kyustendil Province
- Municipality: Kyustendil
- Time zone: UTC+2 (EET)
  - Summer (DST): UTC+3 (EEST)

Gorno Uyno is a village in Kyustendil Municipality, Kyustendil Province, south-western Bulgaria.
