= Rasovo, Kyustendil Province =

Rasyovo Ръсово
- Village
- Location within Bulgaria
- Country: Bulgaria
- Province: Kyustendil Province
- Municipality: Kyustendil
- Time zone: UTC+2 (EET)
  - Summer (DST): UTC+3 (EEST)

Rasovo (Bulgarian: Ръсово [ˈrɤsovo], also transliterated as Rusovo) is a village in Kyustendil Municipality, Kyustendil Province, south-western Bulgaria.
