= Piperkov Chiflik =

Piperkov Chiflik Пиперков чифлик
- Village
- Location within Bulgaria
- Coordinates: 42.2742°N 22.7389°E
- Country: Bulgaria
- Province: Kyustendil Province
- Municipality: Kyustendil
- Time zone: UTC+2 (EET)
  - Summer (DST): UTC+3 (EEST)

"Saint Ivan Rilski" Church, village Piperkov Chiflik, Kyustendil Province, Bulgaria

Piperkov Chiflik is a village in Kyustendil Municipality, Kyustendil Province, south-western Bulgaria.
