= Lomnitsa, Kyustendil Province =

Lomnitsa Ломница
- Village
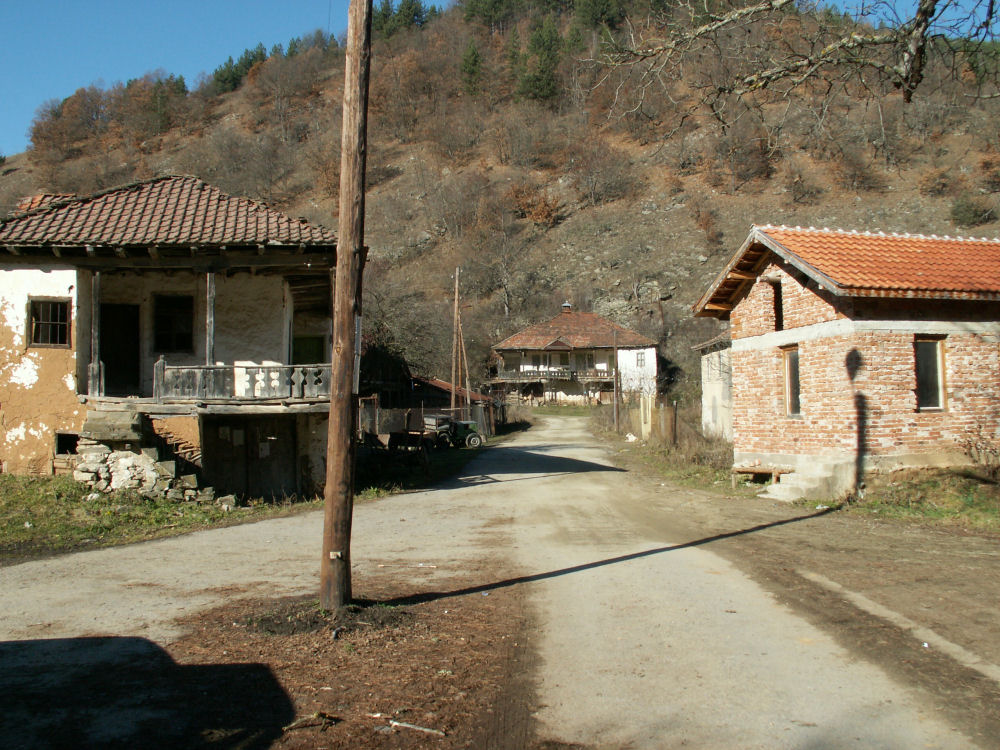

- Location within Bulgaria
- Coordinates: 42°22′57.3″N 22°33′20.4″E
- Country: Bulgaria
- Province: Kyustendil Province
- Municipality: Kyustendil
- Time zone: UTC+2 (EET)
  - Summer (DST): UTC+3 (EEST)

Lomnitsa is a village in Kyustendil Municipality, Kyustendil Province, south-western Bulgaria.
