= Tavalichevo =

Tavalichevo Таваличево
- Village
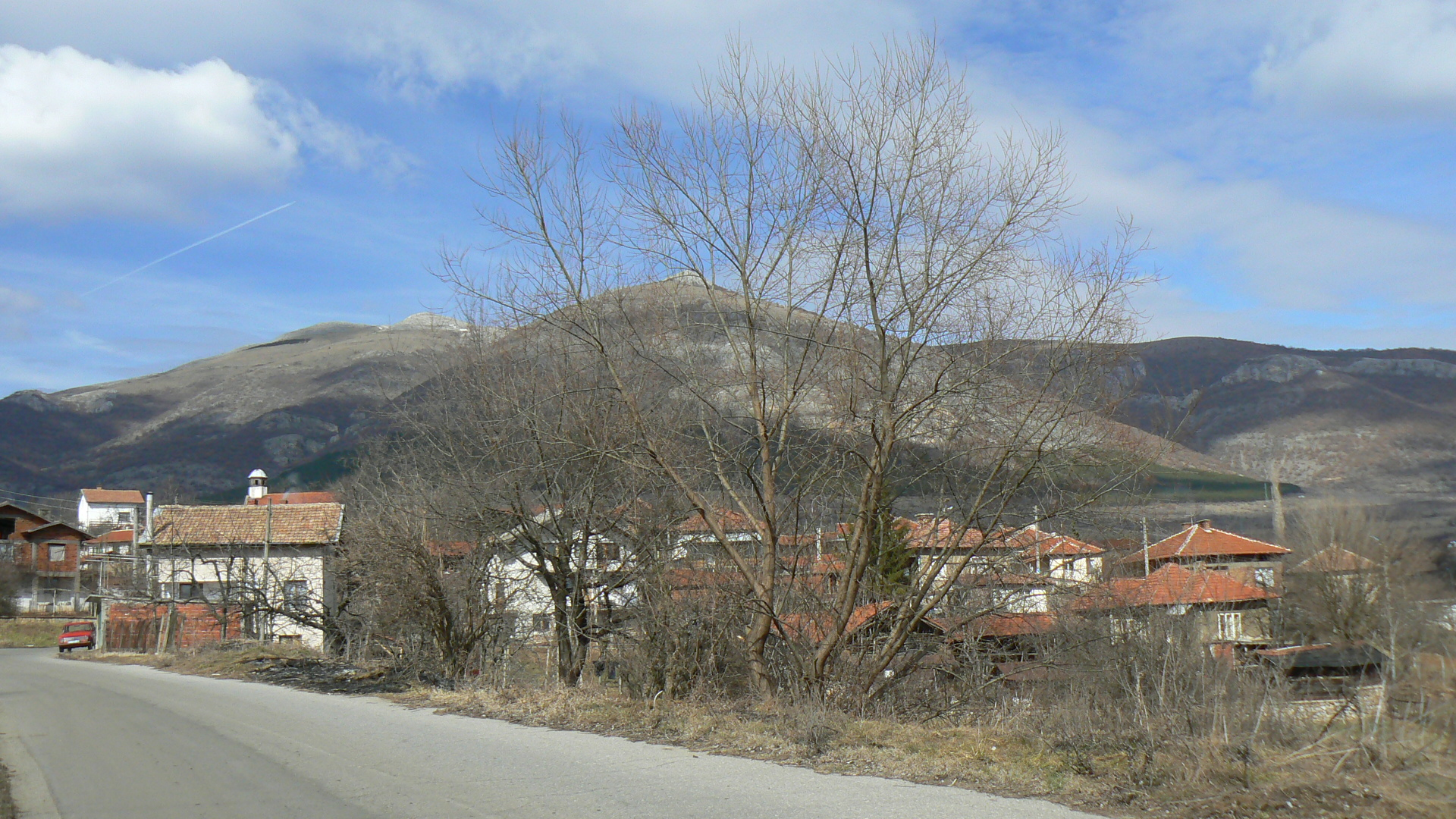
- Village Tavalichevo in the folds of Konyavska planina (Konyavska mountain) in Bulgaria

- Location within Bulgaria
- Coordinates: 42.3119°N 22.8544°E
- Country: Bulgaria
- Province: Kyustendil Province
- Municipality: Kyustendil
- Time zone: UTC+2 (EET)
  - Summer (DST): UTC+3 (EEST)

Tavalichevo is a village in Kyustendil Municipality, Kyustendil Province, south-western Bulgaria.
