= Novi Chiflik =

Novi Chiflik Нови чифлик
- Village
- Location within Bulgaria
- Coordinates: 42.2692°N 22.8083°E
- Country: Bulgaria
- Province: Kyustendil Province
- Municipality: Kyustendil
- Time zone: UTC+2 (EET)
  - Summer (DST): UTC+3 (EEST)

Novi Chiflik is a village in Kyustendil Municipality, Kyustendil Province, south-western Bulgaria.
