= Bunovo, Kyustendil Province =

Bunovo Буново
- Village
- Location within Bulgaria
- Coordinates: 42.3833°N 22.7681°E
- Country: Bulgaria
- Province: Kyustendil Province
- Municipality: Kyustendil
- Time zone: UTC+2 (EET)
  - Summer (DST): UTC+3 (EEST)

Bunovo is a village in Kyustendil Municipality, Kyustendil Province, south-western Bulgaria.

== Honours ==
Bunovo Peak on Fallières Coast, Antarctica is named after the village.
