= Vratsa (village) =

Vratsa Bulgarian: Вратца
- Village
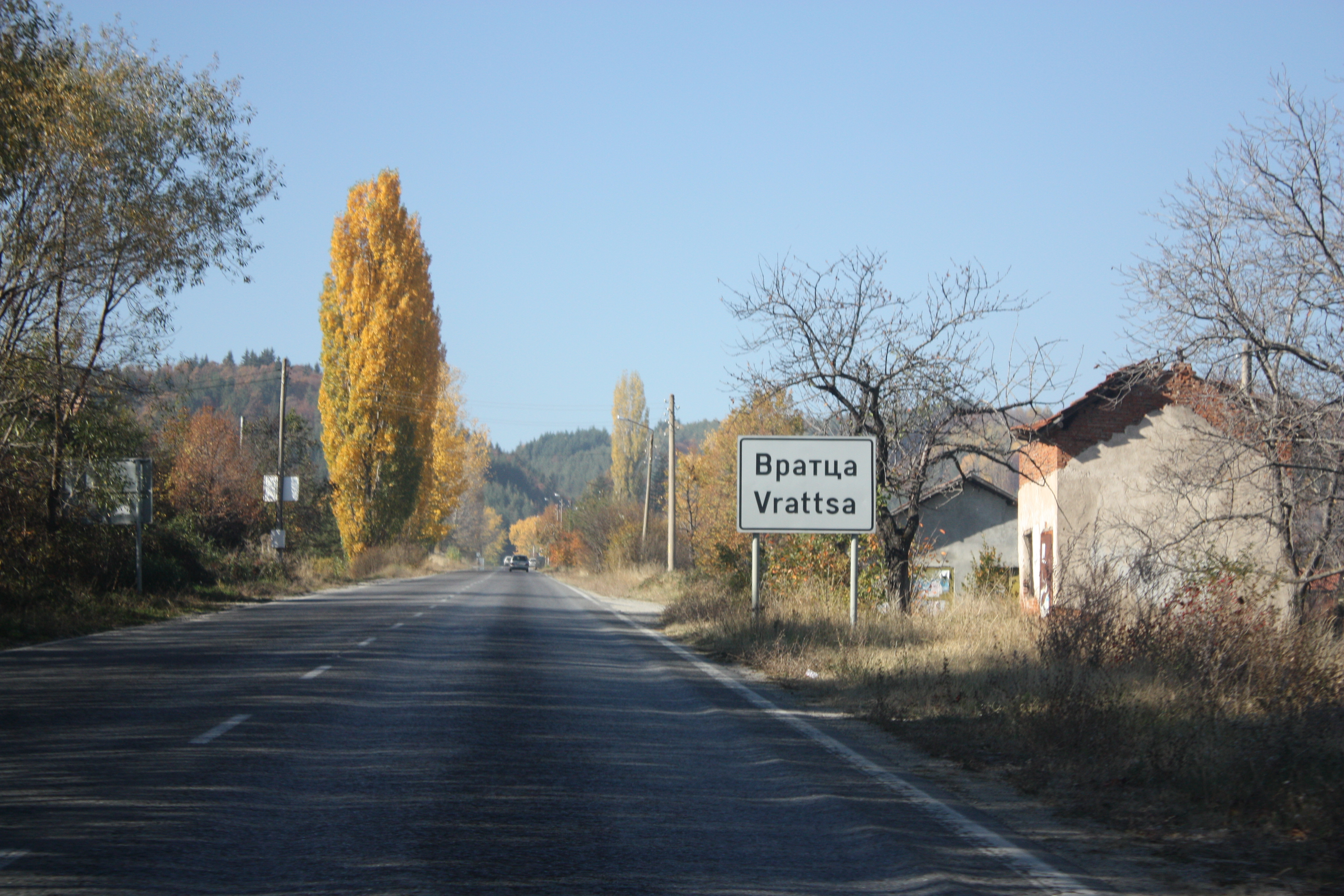

- Location within Bulgaria
- Coordinates: 42.2642°N 22.5914°E
- Country: Bulgaria
- Province: Kyustendil Province
- Municipality: Kyustendil
- Time zone: UTC+2 (EET)
  - Summer (DST): UTC+3 (EEST)

Vratsa is a village in Kyustendil Municipality, Kyustendil Province, south-western Bulgaria.
