= Dolno Uyno =

Dolno Uyno Долно Уйно
- Village
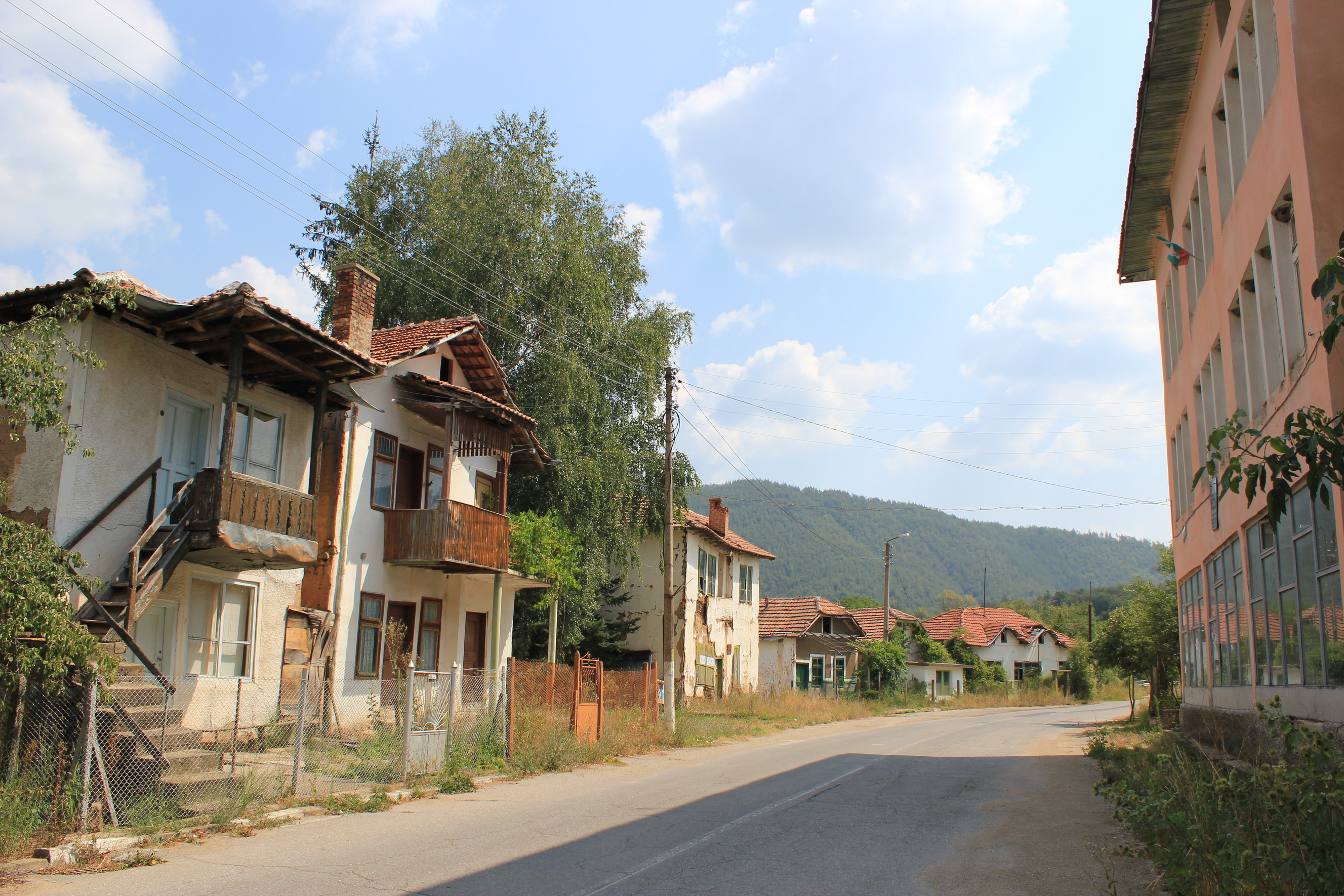

- Location within Bulgaria
- Coordinates: 42.4167°N 22.5769°E
- Country: Bulgaria
- Province: Kyustendil Province
- Municipality: Kyustendil
- Time zone: UTC+2 (EET)
  - Summer (DST): UTC+3 (EEST)

Dolno Uyno is a village in Kyustendil Municipality, Kyustendil Province, south-western Bulgaria.
