= Kyustendil Municipality =

Kyustendil Municipality Община Кюстендил
- Municipality
- Location within Bulgaria
- Coordinates: 42°17′N 22°41′E
- Country: Bulgaria
- Province: Kyustendil
- Municipality: Kyustendil

Area
  - Total: 979.91 km^{2} (378.35 sq mi)

Population (1-Feb-2011)
  - Total: 60,681
  - Density: 61.925/km^{2} (160.39/sq mi)
- Time zone: UTC+2 (EET)
  - Summer (DST): UTC+3 (EEST)
- Area code: 4
- Website: kustendil.bg

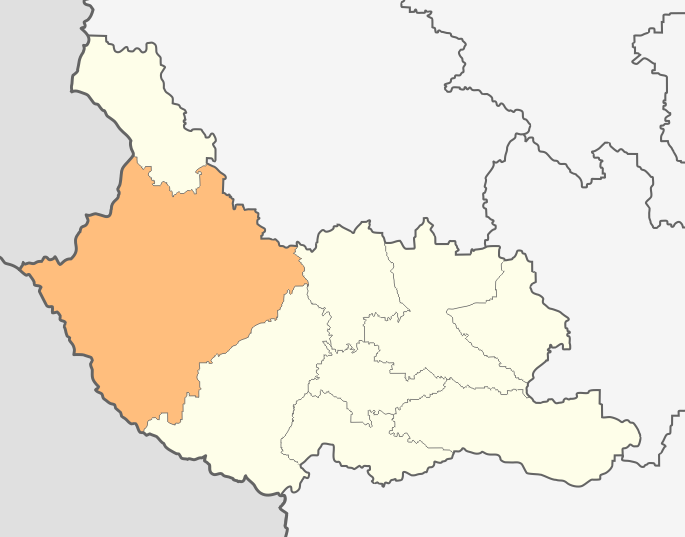
Kyustendil municipality within Kyustendil Province

Kyustendil Municipality is a municipality in Kyustendil Province, Bulgaria. The administrative centre is Kyustendil.

== Demography ==
=== Religion ===
According to the latest Bulgarian census of 2011, the religious composition, among those who answered the optional question on religious identification, was the following:

Religious composition of Kyustendil Municipality
Orthodox Christianity	85.7%
Catholicism	0.2%
Protestantism	4.0%
Islam	0.1%
No religion	4.3%
Prefer not to answer, others and indefinable	5.7%

== Villages ==
In addition to the capital town of Kyustendil, the municipality consists of 69 villages.

- Bagrentsi
- Bersin
- Blatets
- Bobeshino
- Bogoslov
- Bunovo
- Vratsa
- Girchevtsi
- Goranovtsi
- Gorna Brestnitsa
- Gorna Grashtnitsa
- Gorno Uyno
- Gramazhdano
- Granitsa
- Gurbanovtsi
- Garbino
- Garlyano
- Gyueshevo
- Dvorishta
- Dozhdevitsa
- Dolna Grashtitsa
- Dolno Selo
- Dolno Uyno
- Dragovishtitsa
- Zhabokrat
- Zheravino
- Zhilentsi
- Ivanovtsi
- Kamenichka Skakavitsa
- Katrishte
- Konyavo
- Kopilovtsi
- Kopriva
- Kutugertsi
- Karshalevo
- Lelintsi
- Lisets
- Lozno
- Lomnitsa
- Mazarachevo
- Novi Chiflik
- Novo Selo
- Piperkov Chiflik
- Poletintsi
- Polska Skakavitsa
- Prekolnitsa
- Radlovtsi
- Razhdavitsa
- Ranentsi
- Rezhintsi
- Rasovo
- Savoyski
- Sazhdenik
- Skrinyano
- Slokostitsa
- Sovolyano
- Stensko
- Tavalichevo
- Tarnovlag
- Tarsino
- Tserovitsa
- Tsreshnovo
- Tsarvena Yabalka
- Tsarvendol
- Tsarvenyano
- Chudintsi
- Shipochano
- Shishkovtsi
- Yabalkovo
