= Radlovtsi =

Radlovtsi Радловци
- Village
- Location within Bulgaria
- Coordinates: 42.3142°N 22.6364°E
- Country: Bulgaria
- Province: Kyustendil Province
- Municipality: Kyustendil
- Time zone: UTC+2 (EET)
  - Summer (DST): UTC+3 (EEST)

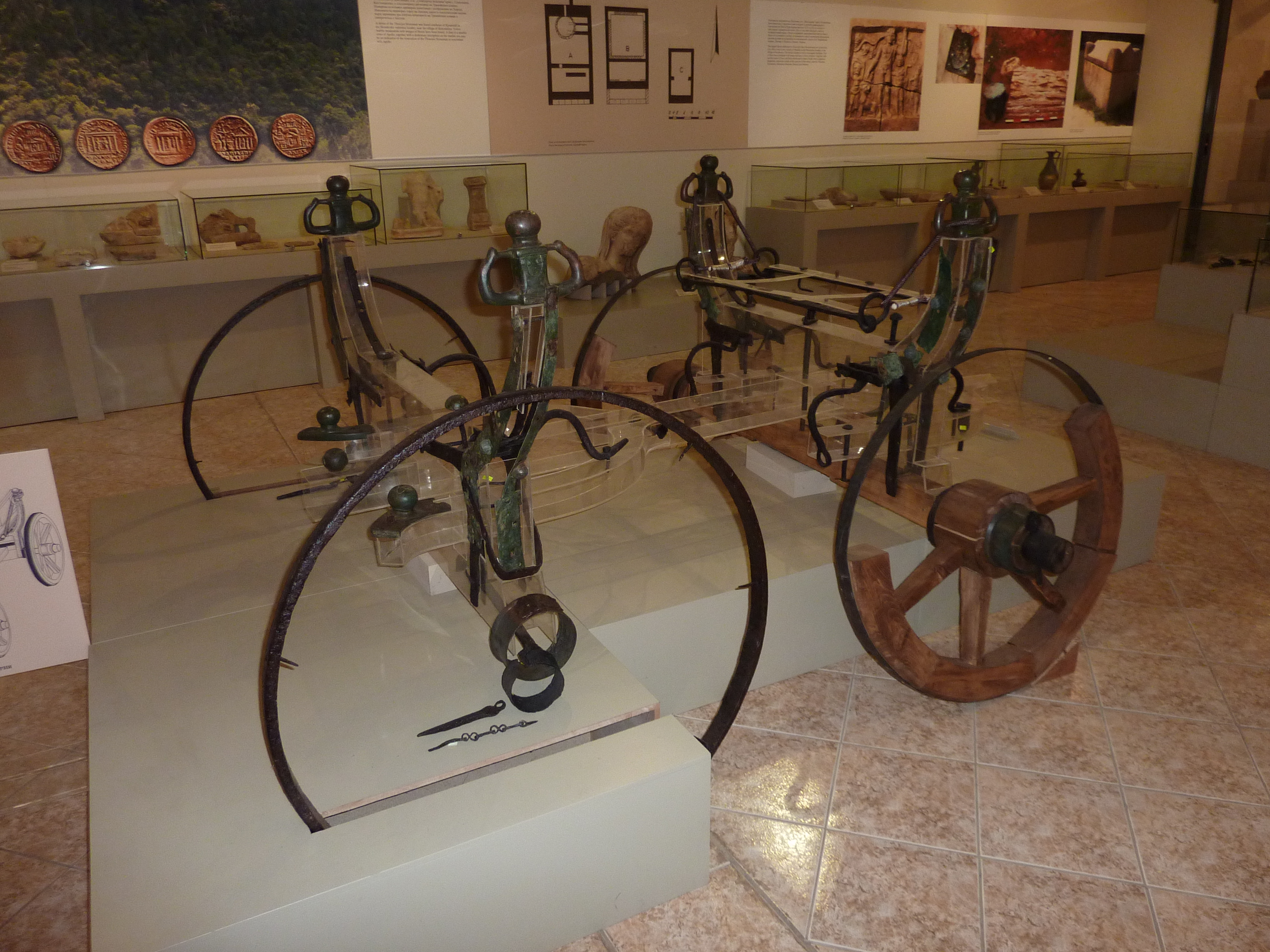
Thracian Roman quadricycle found near the village Radlovtsi

Radlovtsi is a village in Kyustendil Municipality, Kyustendil Province, south-western Bulgaria.
