= Dozhdevitsa =

Dozhdevitsa Дождевица
- Village
- Location within Bulgaria
- Coordinates: 42.3292°N 22.5650°E
- Country: Bulgaria
- Province: Kyustendil Province
- Municipality: Kyustendil
- Time zone: UTC+2 (EET)
  - Summer (DST): UTC+3 (EEST)

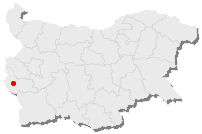
Kyustendil on the Bulgarian map

Dozhdevitsa is a village in Kyustendil Municipality, Kyustendil Province, south-western Bulgaria.
