= Lozno, Kyustendil Province =

Lozno Лозно
- Village
- Interactive map of Lozno
- Country: Bulgaria
- Province: Kyustendil Province
- Municipality: Kyustendil
- Time zone: UTC+2 (EET)
  - Summer (DST): UTC+3 (EEST)

Lozno is a village in Kyustendil Municipality, Kyustendil Province, south-western Bulgaria.
