= Dolno Selo =

Dolno Selo Долно село
- Village
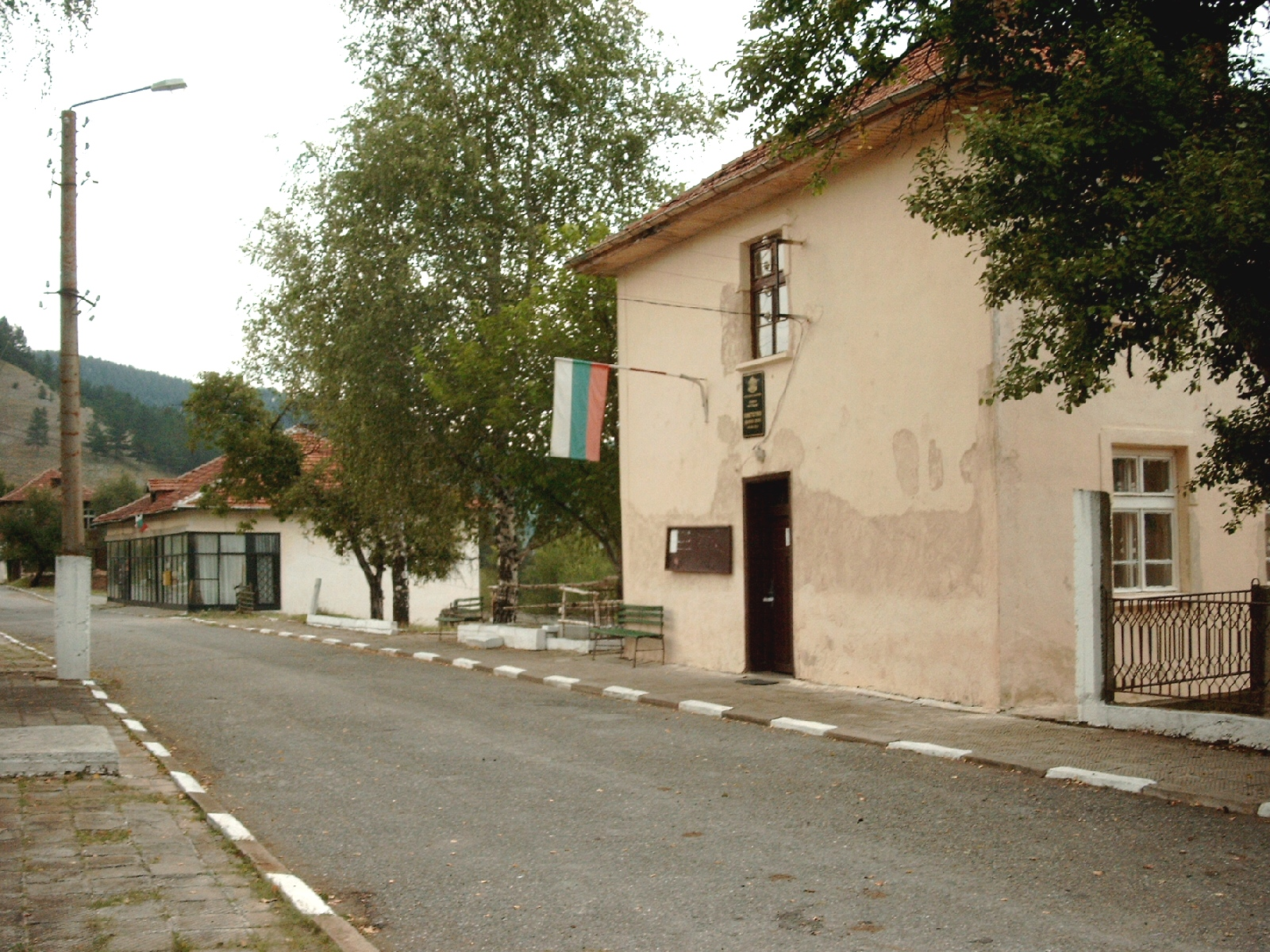
- The mayor's office in village Dolno selo, Bulgaria

- Location within Bulgaria
- Coordinates: 42.3025°N 22.4869°E
- Country: Bulgaria
- Province: Kyustendil Province
- Municipality: Kyustendil
- Time zone: UTC+2 (EET)
  - Summer (DST): UTC+3 (EEST)

Dolno Selo is a village in Kyustendil Municipality, Kyustendil Province, south-western Bulgaria.
