= Dragovishtitsa, Kyustendil Province =

Dragovishtitsa Драговищица
- Village
- Location within Bulgaria
- Coordinates: 42.3714°N 22.6500°E
- Country: Bulgaria
- Province: Kyustendil Province
- Municipality: Kyustendil
- Time zone: UTC+2 (EET)
  - Summer (DST): UTC+3 (EEST)

Dragovishtitsa is a village in Kyustendil Municipality, Kyustendil Province, south-western Bulgaria.

== Gallery ==
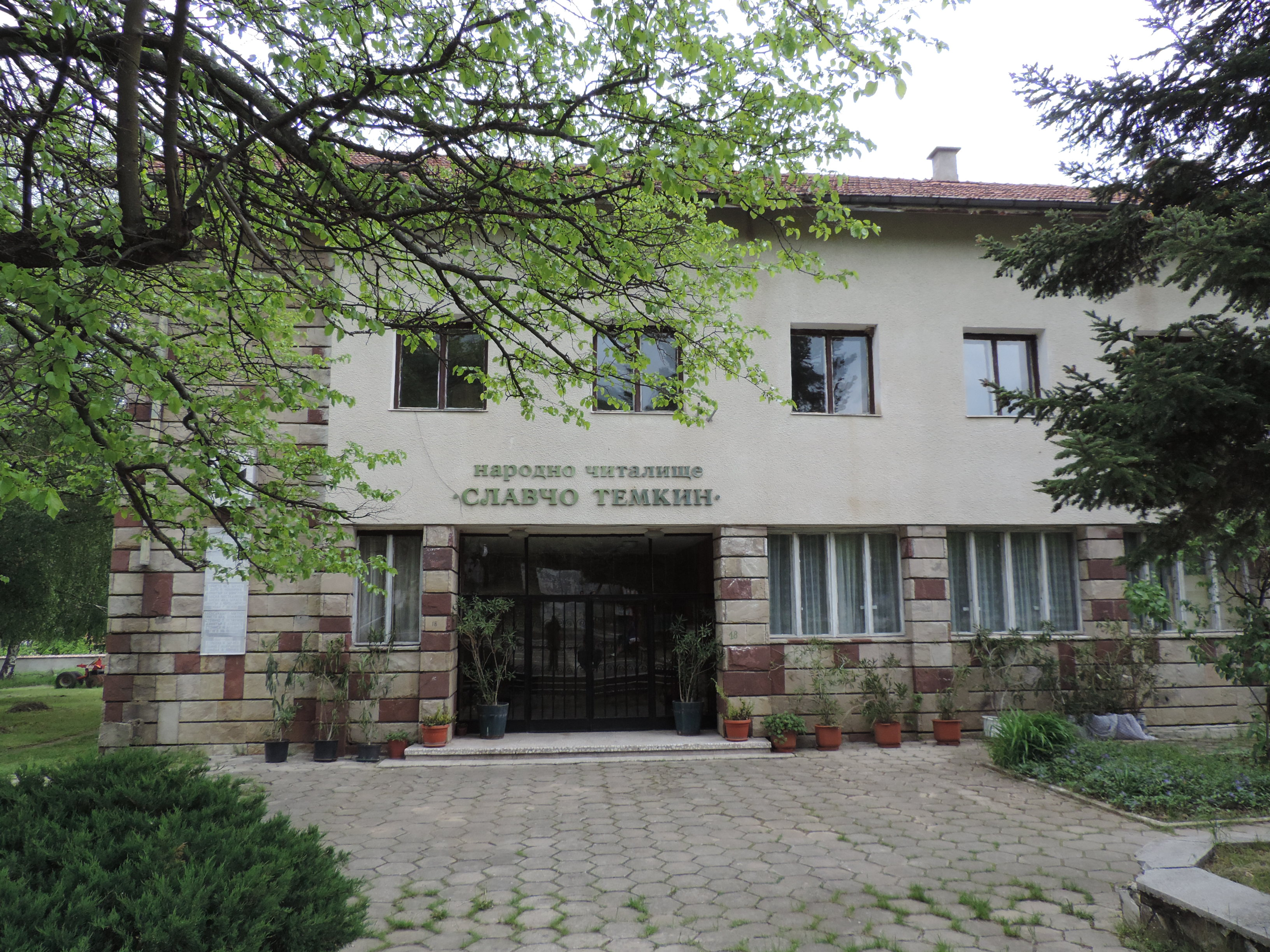
The community centre (chitalishte) "Slavcho Temkin"

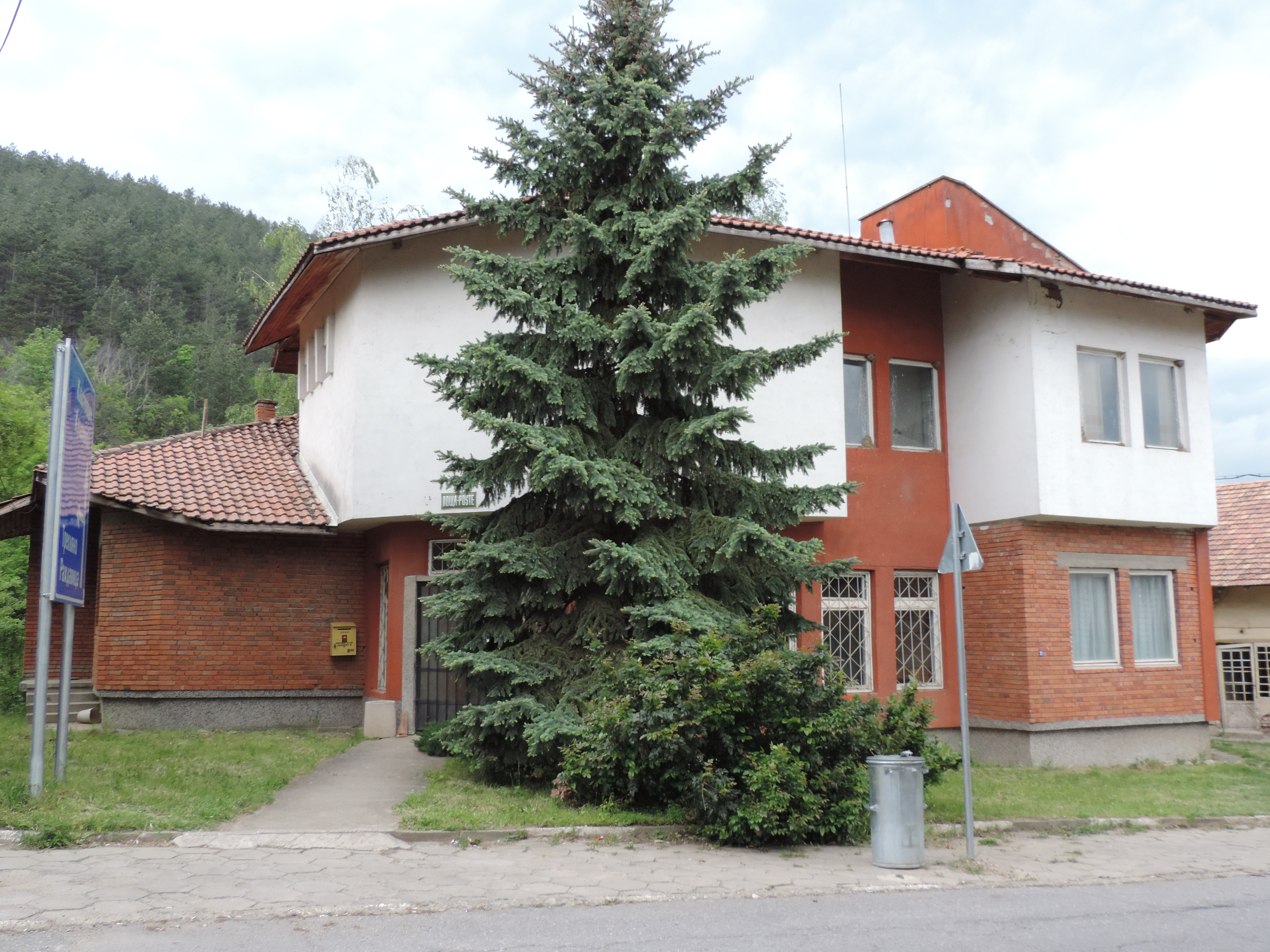
The post office

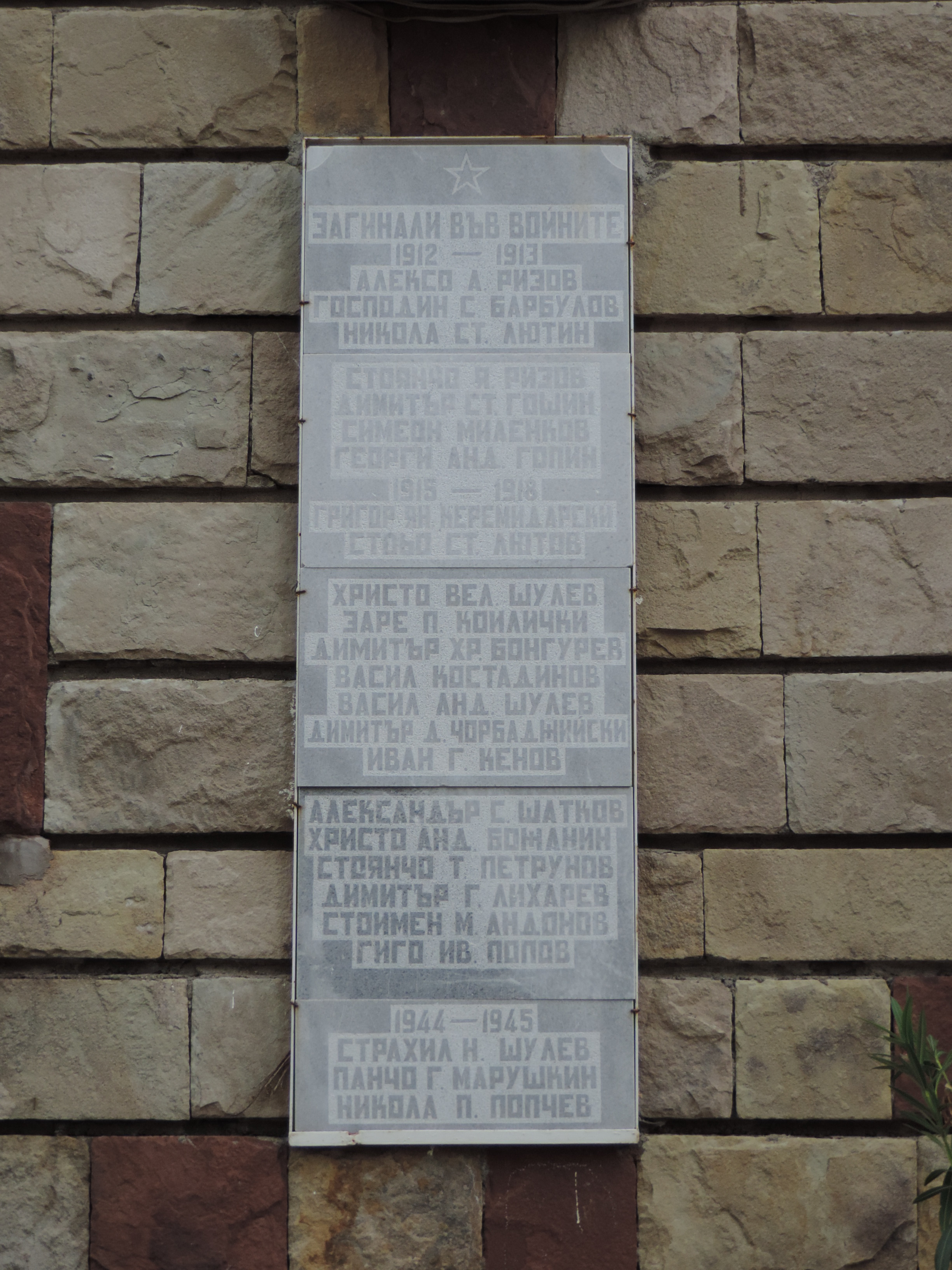
War memorial plaque

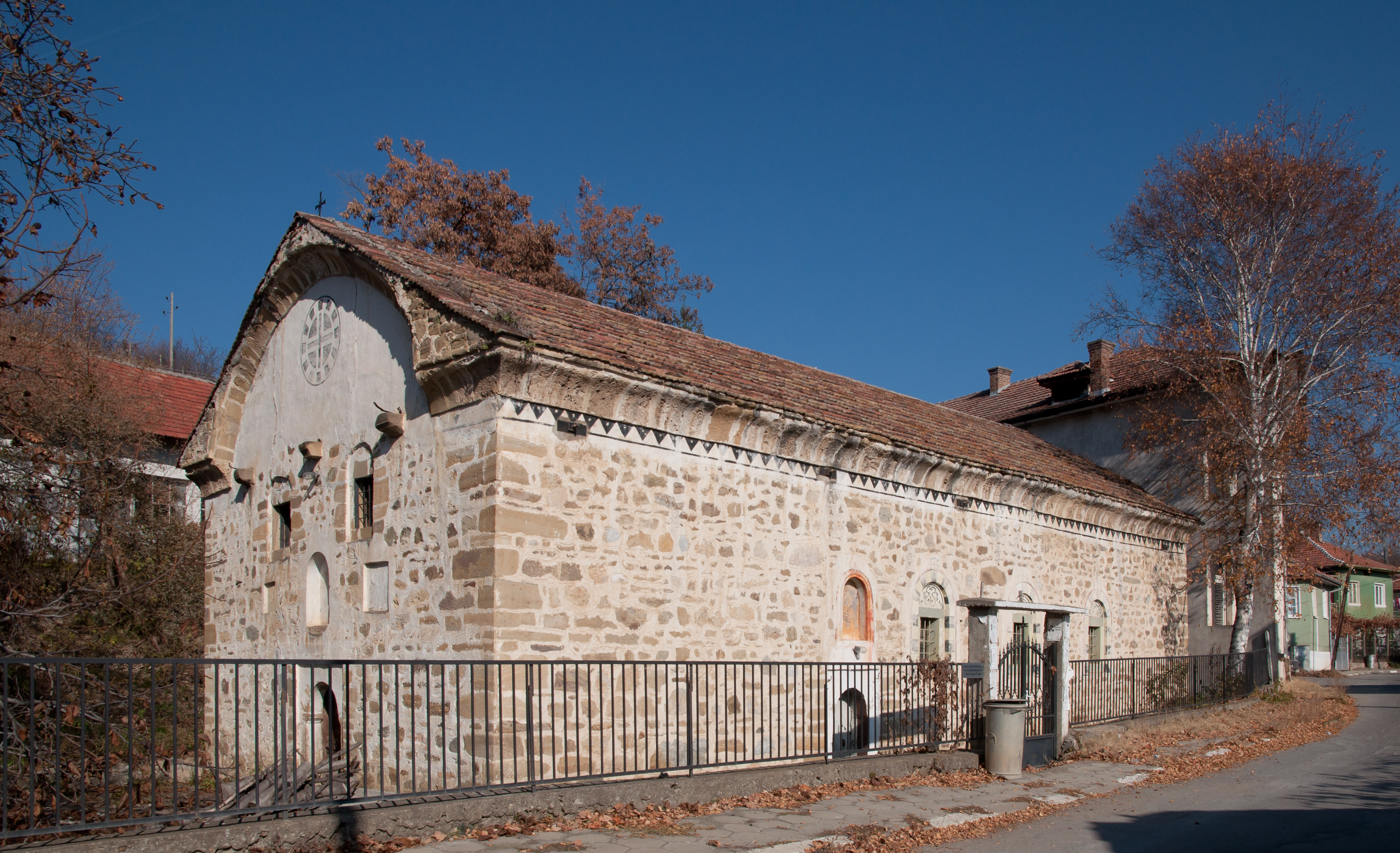
Church "Dormition of the Theotokos"

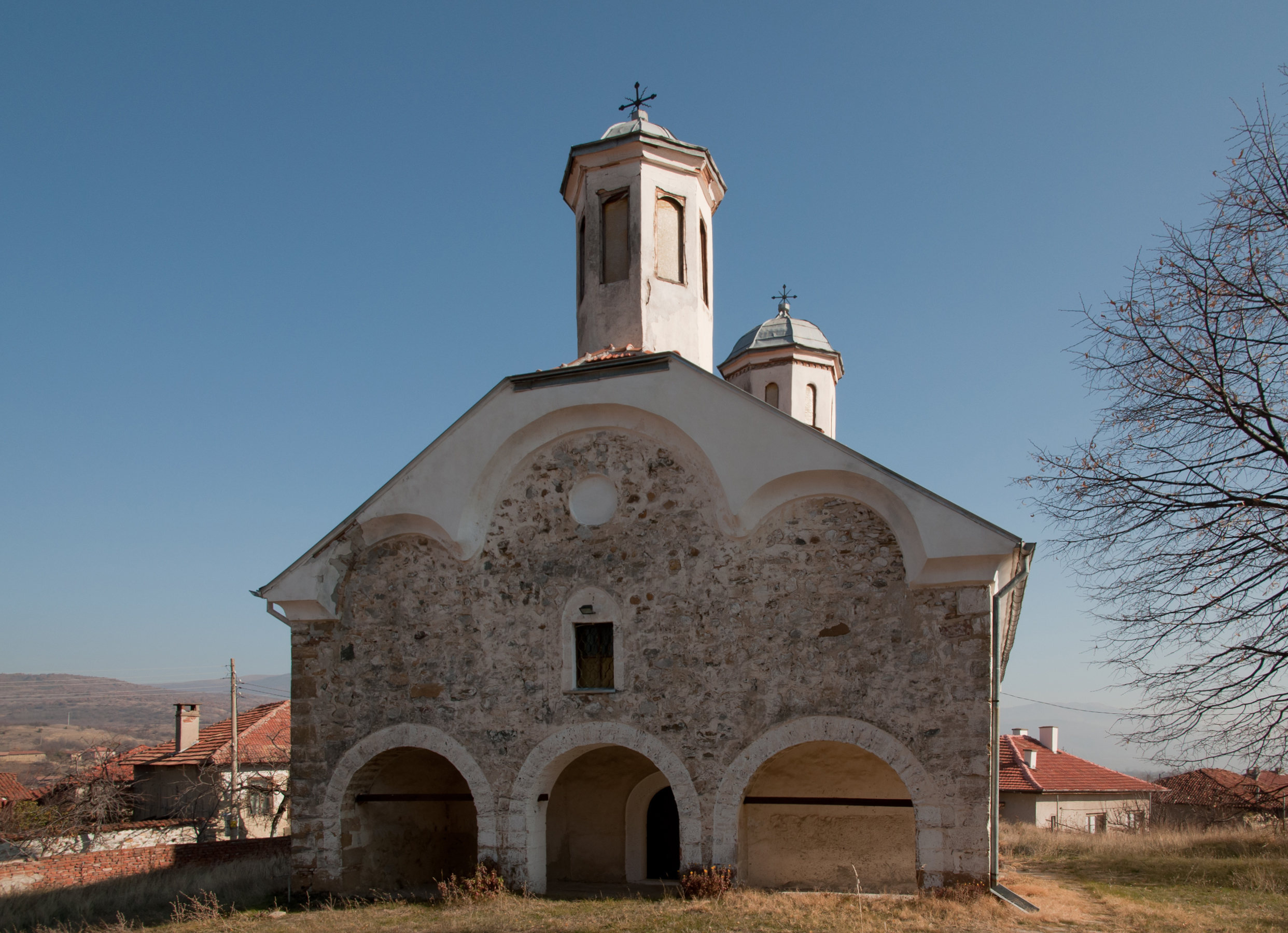
Church "Saint Demetrius"
