= List of mountains in Bulgaria =

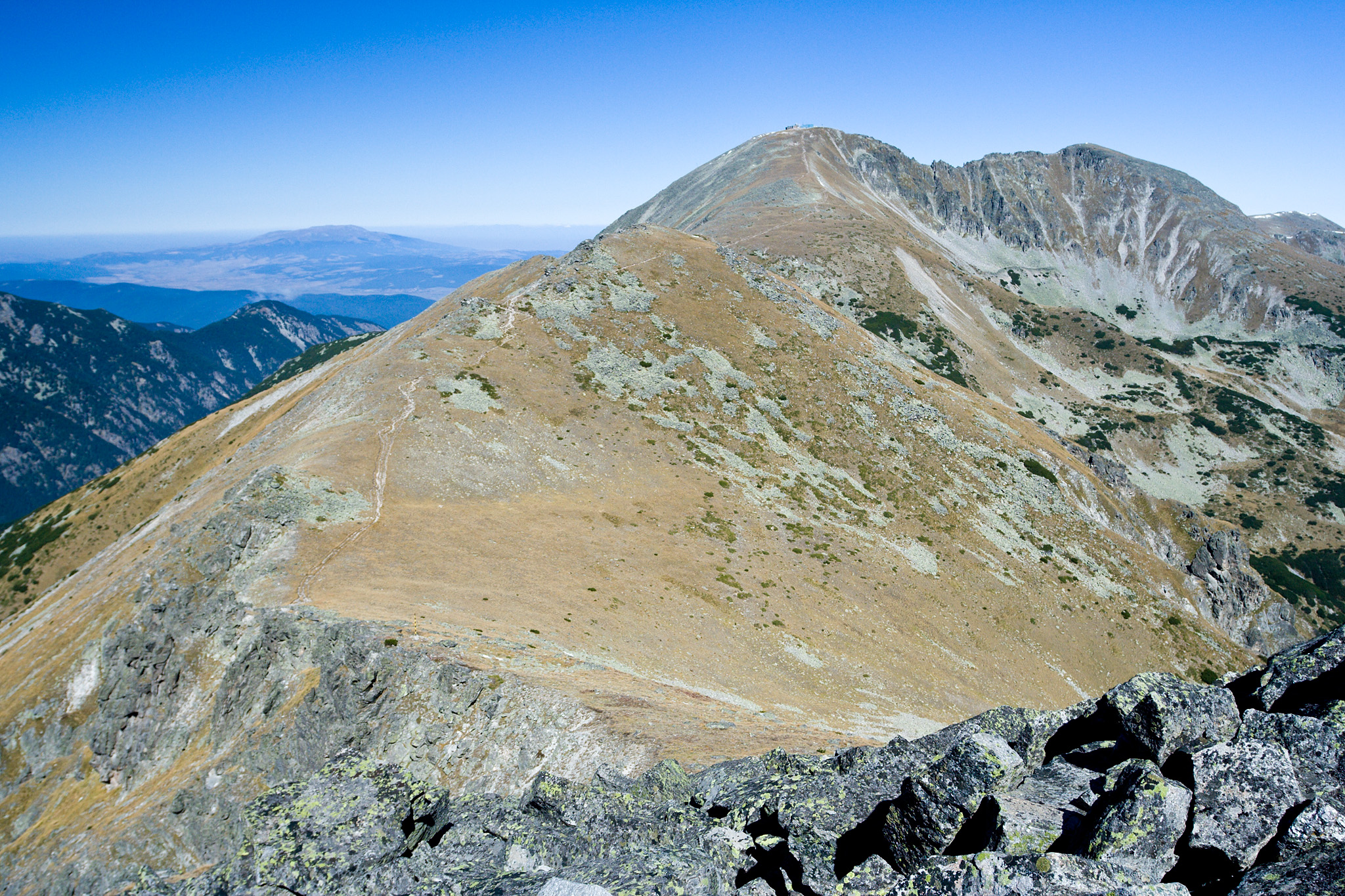
Musala Peak, Rila

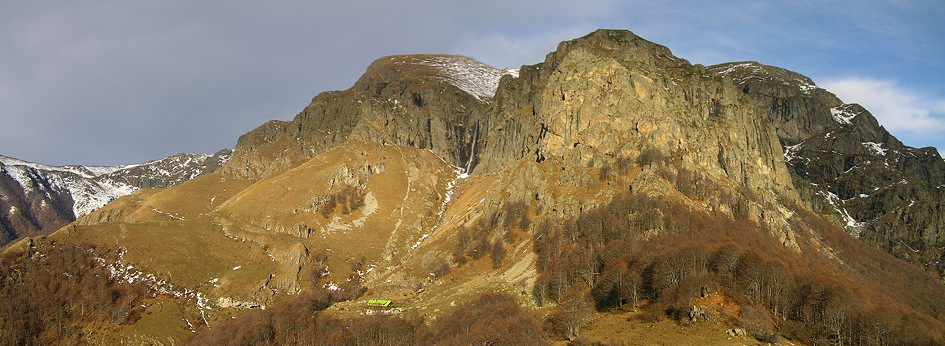
The Central Balkan National Park, Balkan Mountains

Mountains constitute a significant part of Bulgaria and are dominant in the southwest and central parts. Bulgaria's highest mountains are Rila (highest peak Musala, 2925 m; the highest in the Balkans) and Pirin (highest peak Vihren, 2914 m). The large mountain chain of Stara planina (Balkan Mountains) runs west–east across the entire country, bisecting it and giving the name to the entire Balkan peninsula. Other extensive mountains are the massifs Rhodopes and Strandzha in the south.

== List of mountains in Bulgaria with their highest peaks ==
Mountains above 2000 metres are shown in bold type.

- **Belasitsa (2,029 m, Radomir peak)**
- **Berkovska mountain (2,016 m, Kom Peak, Western Balkan Mountains)**
- Bilo Mountains
- Bohovska planina (1,318 m, Ogorelitsa)
- Cherna gora (1,129 m, Tumba)
- **Chiprovska mountain (2,168 m, Midzhur, Western Balkan Mountains)**
- Chudinska planina (1,497 m, Aramliya)
- Elovishka Planina (1,329 m, Plocha)
- Erulska planina (1,481 m, Golemi vrah)
- Ezdimirska Planina (1,219 m, Golemi vrah)
- Golo bardo (1,158 m, Vetrushka)
- Greben (1,338 m, Dziglina livada, Serbia)
- **Kaloferska mountain (2,376 m, Botev Peak, Central Balkan Mountains)**
- Karvav Kamak (1,737 m, Bilo)
- Kobilska Planina (1,312 m, Chardak)
- Konyavska planina (1,487 m, Viden)
- Leshnikovska Planina (1,086 m, Zlataritsa)
- Lisets (1,500 m, Vrashnik)
- Lozenska planina
- Lyubash (1,398 m, Lyubash)
- Lyulin Mountain (1,256 m, Dupevitsa)
- Maleshevska planina (1,803 m, Ilyov vrah)
- Milevska planina (1,733 m, Milevets)
- Ograzhden (1,644 m, Bilska chuka)
- **Osogovska planina (2,251 m, Ruen peak)**
- Penkyovska planina (1,187 m, Konski vrah)
- **Pirin (2,914 m, Vihren)**
- Plana (1338 m, Manastirishte)
- **Rhodopes (2,191 m, Golyam Perelik)**
- **Rila (2,925 m, Musala)**
- Ruy (1,706 m, Ruy)
- Sakar (856 m, Vishegrad)
- **Slavyanka (2,212 m, Gotsev vrah)**
- Sredna gora (1,604 m, Golyam Bogdan)
- Stargach (1,218 m, Asanov vrah)
- Strandzha (710 m, Golyamo Gradishte)
- Strazha (1,389 m, Strazha)
- **Troyanska mountain (2,166 m, Levski Peak (also Ambaritsa), Central Balkan Mountains)**
- Tsarichka planina (1,671 m, Ostrika)
- Verila (1,415 m, Golyam Debelets)
- Viskyar (1,077 m, Mechi kamak)
- **Vitosha (2,290 m, Cherni Vrah)**
- Vlahina (1,924 m, Ogreyak/Kadiytsa)
- Zavalska Planina (1,181 m, Kitka)
- Zemenska planina (1,295 m, Tichak)
- **Zlatishko-Tetevenska mountain (2,198 m, Vezhen Peak, Central Balkan Mountains)**
- Znepolska Rudina (1,485 m, Golema Rudina)

== List of peaks above 2500 m ==
Peak	Height in meters	Mountain
Musala	2925	Rila
Vihren	2914	Pirin
Kutelo	2908	Pirin
Malka Musala	2902	Rila
Banski Suhodol	2884	Pirin
Irechek	2852	Rila
Polezhan	2851	Pirin
Kamenitsa	2822	Pirin
Malak Polezhan	2822	Pirin
Bayuvi Dupki	2820	Pirin
Deno	2790	Rila
Ovcharets	2768	Rila
Yalovarnika	2763	Pirin
Gazey	2761	Pirin
Kaymakchal	2753	Pirin
Todorka	2746	Pirin
Banderishki Chukar	2732	Pirin
Golyam Kupen	2731	Rila
Zhangal	2730	Pirin
Malyovitsa	2729	Rila
Momin Dvor	2723	Pirin
Bashliyski Chukar	2670	Pirin
Malka Todorka	2712	Pirin
Debeli Rid	2709	Pirin
Popova Kapa	2704	Rila
Dislitsa	2700	Pirin
Malka Malyovitsa	2698	Rila
Lopushki Vrah	2698	Rila
Lovnitsa	2695	Rila
Kanarata	2691	Rila
Kamenishka Kukla	2690	Pirin
Kuklite	2686	Pirin
Orlovets	2685	Rila
Pastri Slap	2684	Rila
Beliya Zab	2678	Rila
Damga	2669	Rila
Muratov Vrah	2669	Pirin
Dzhano	2668	Pirin
Eleni Vrah	2654	Rila
Bezbog	2645	Pirin
Angelov Vrah	2643	Rila
Ravni Vrah	2637	Rila
Belmeken	2627	Rila
Kamilata	2621	Rila
Golyam Mechi Vrah	2618	Rila
Dvuglav	2605	Rila
Golyam Mermer (Mramorets)	2598	Rila
Dodov (Drushlevishki) Vrah	2597	Rila
Sivriya	2593	Pirin
Kozi Vrah	2587	Rila
Iglata	2575	Rila
Golyam Mechit (Medarnik)	2568	Rila
Ushite	2560	Rila
Prichi Vrah	2536	Rila
Malak Mechit	2535	Rila
Sinanitsa	2516	Pirin

== Gallery ==
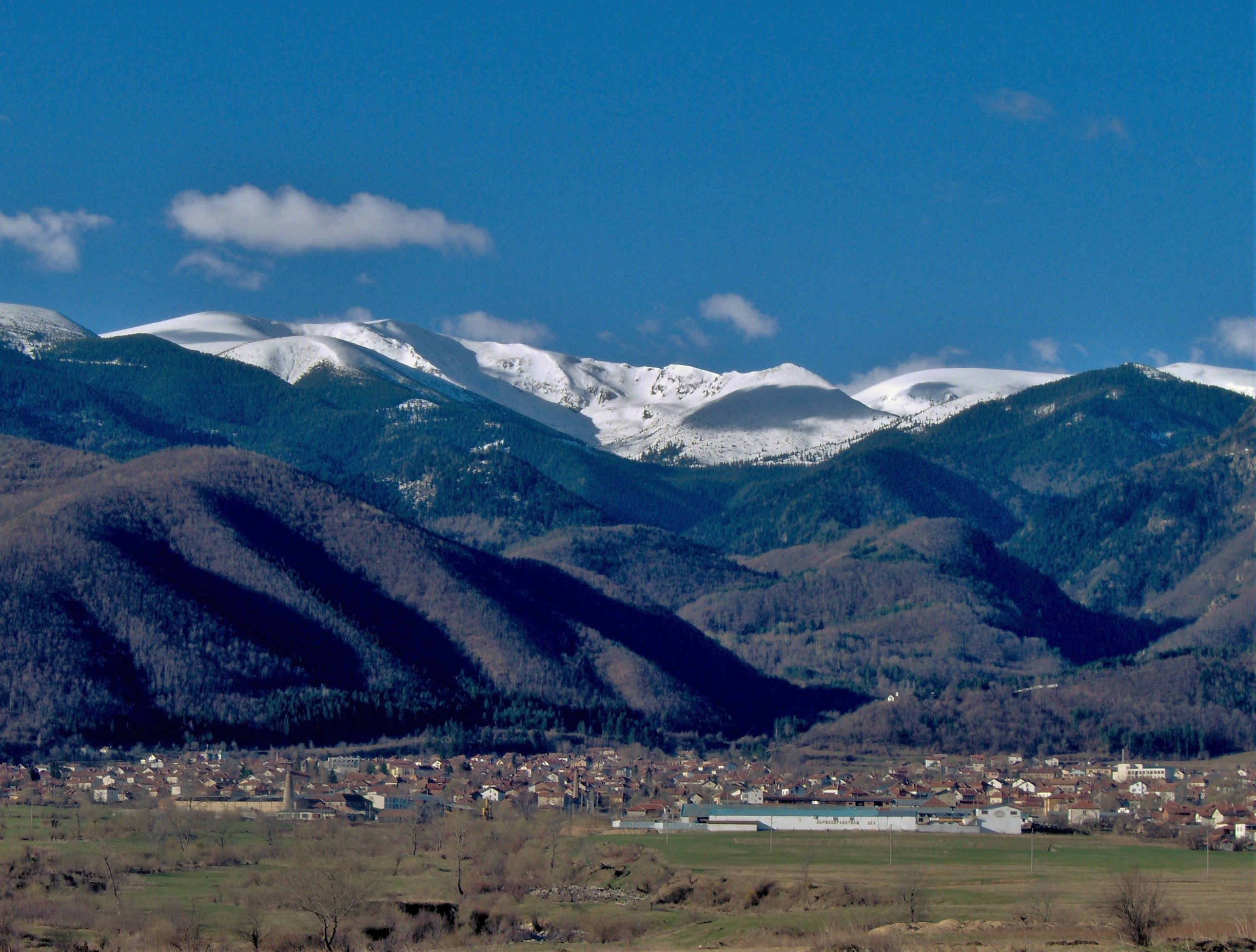
Rila as seen from the village of Kostenets, Sofia Province

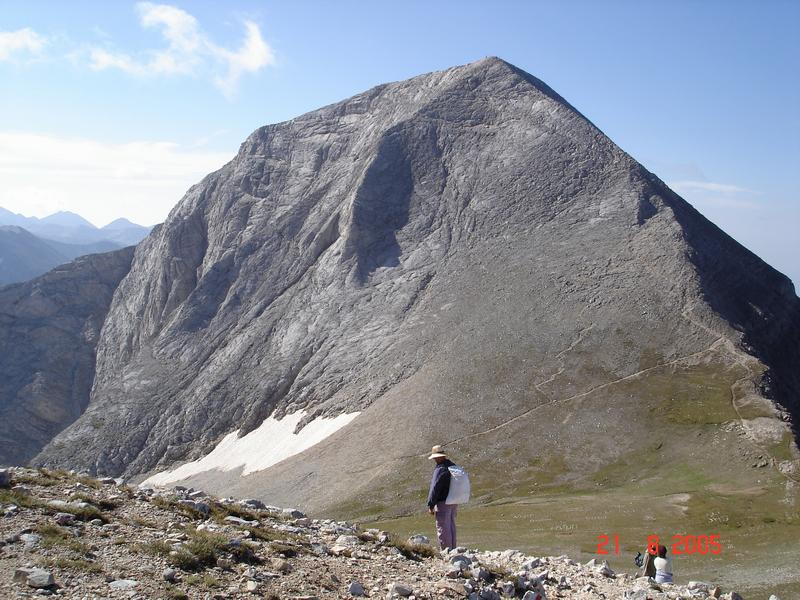
Vihren Peak in Pirin as seen from the north

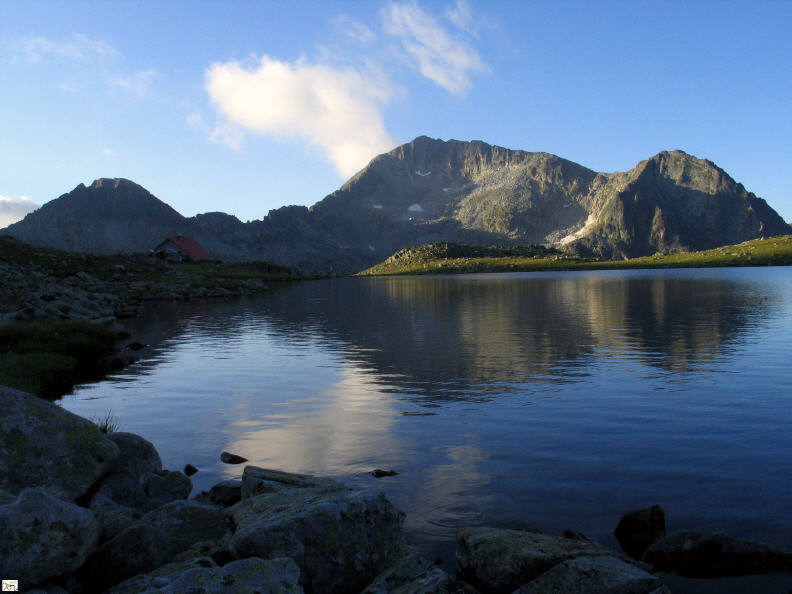
Kamenitsa Peak and Tevno Ezero Lake, Pirin

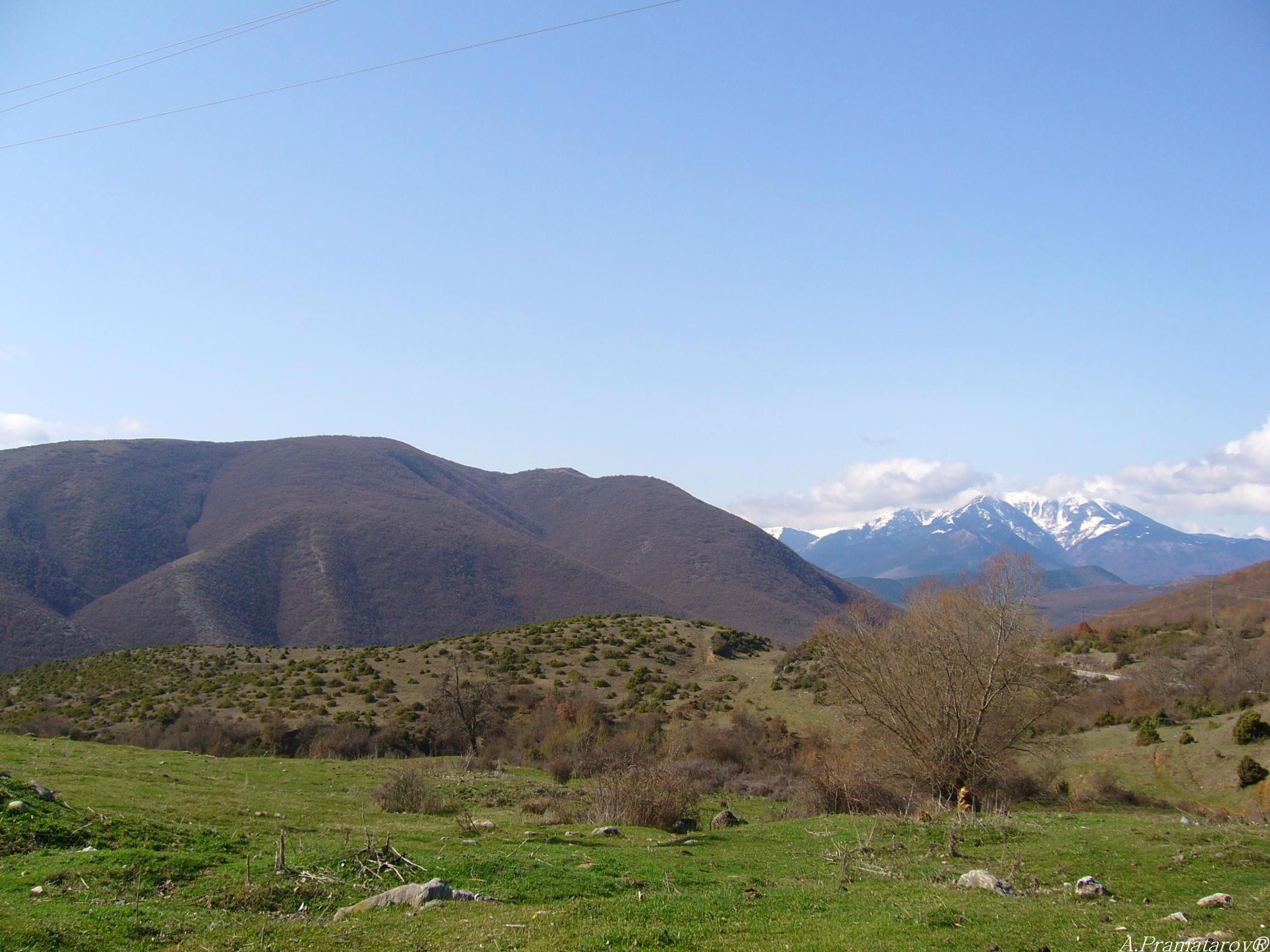
Stargach and Slavyanka mountains

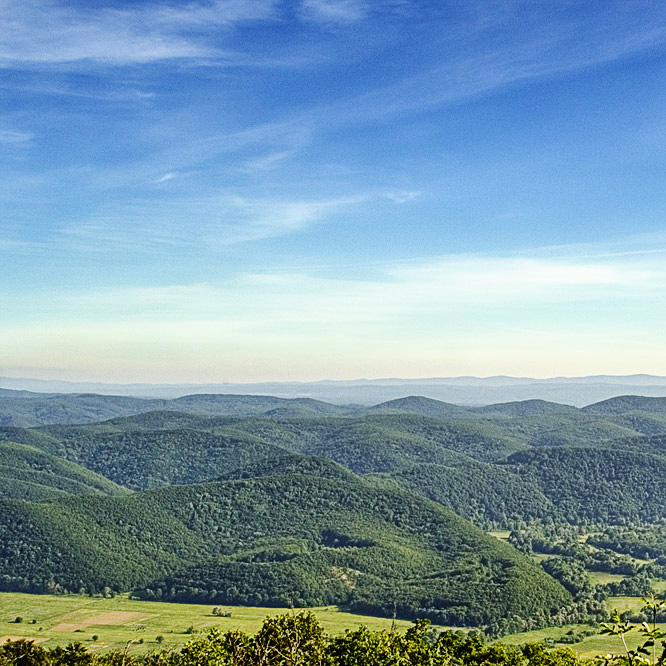
View from Papiya Peak, Strandzha

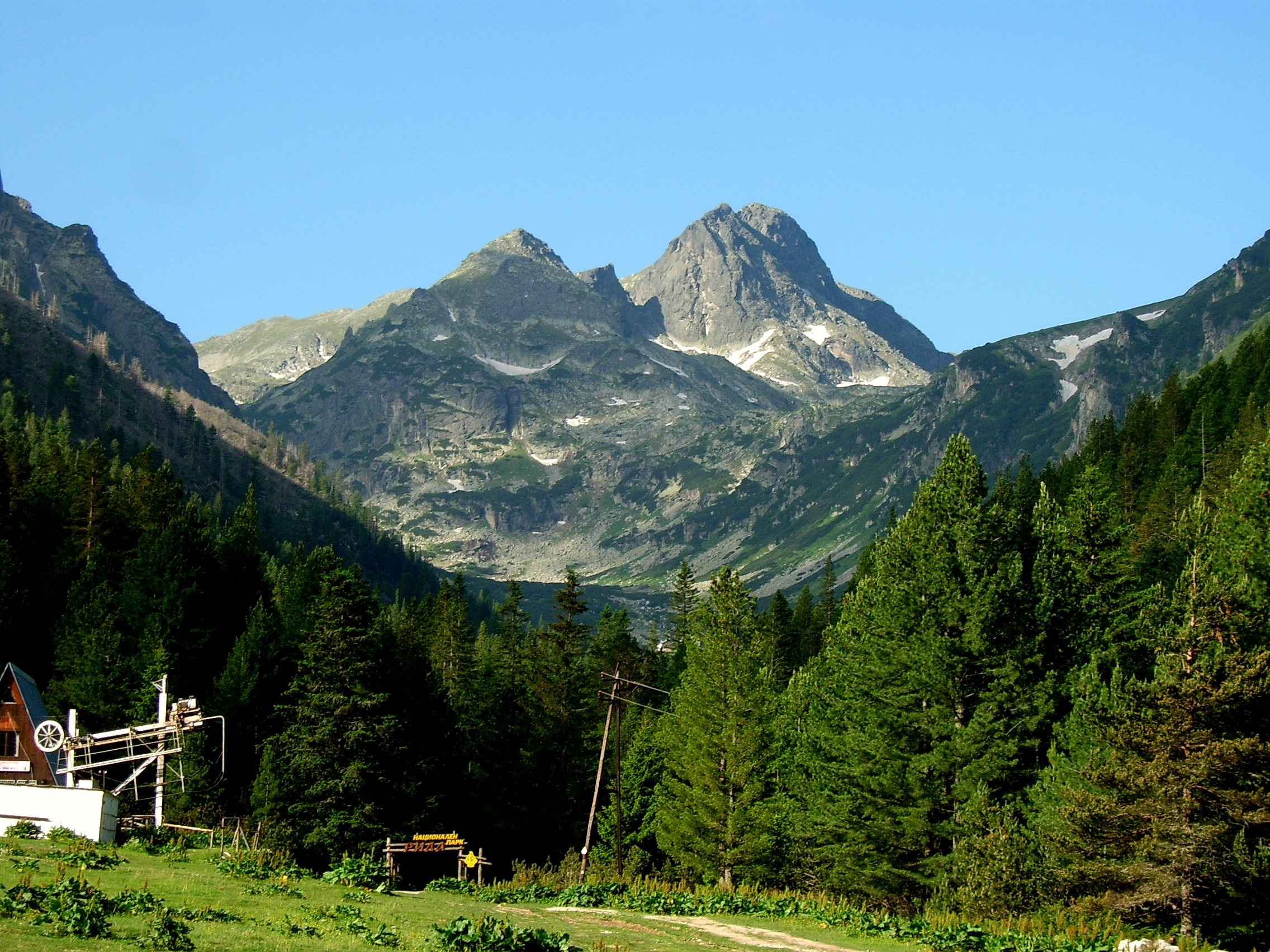
Malyovitsa Peak in Rila

== See also ==
- List of mountain peaks in Pirin
- Rila
- Balkan Mountains
- Rhodope Mountains
- List of mountains of the Balkans
- List of European ultra-prominent peaks
- List of the highest European ultra-prominent peaks
- List of mountain ranges
- Most isolated major summits of Europe
- Southernmost glacial mass in Europe
