= Treklyanska reka =

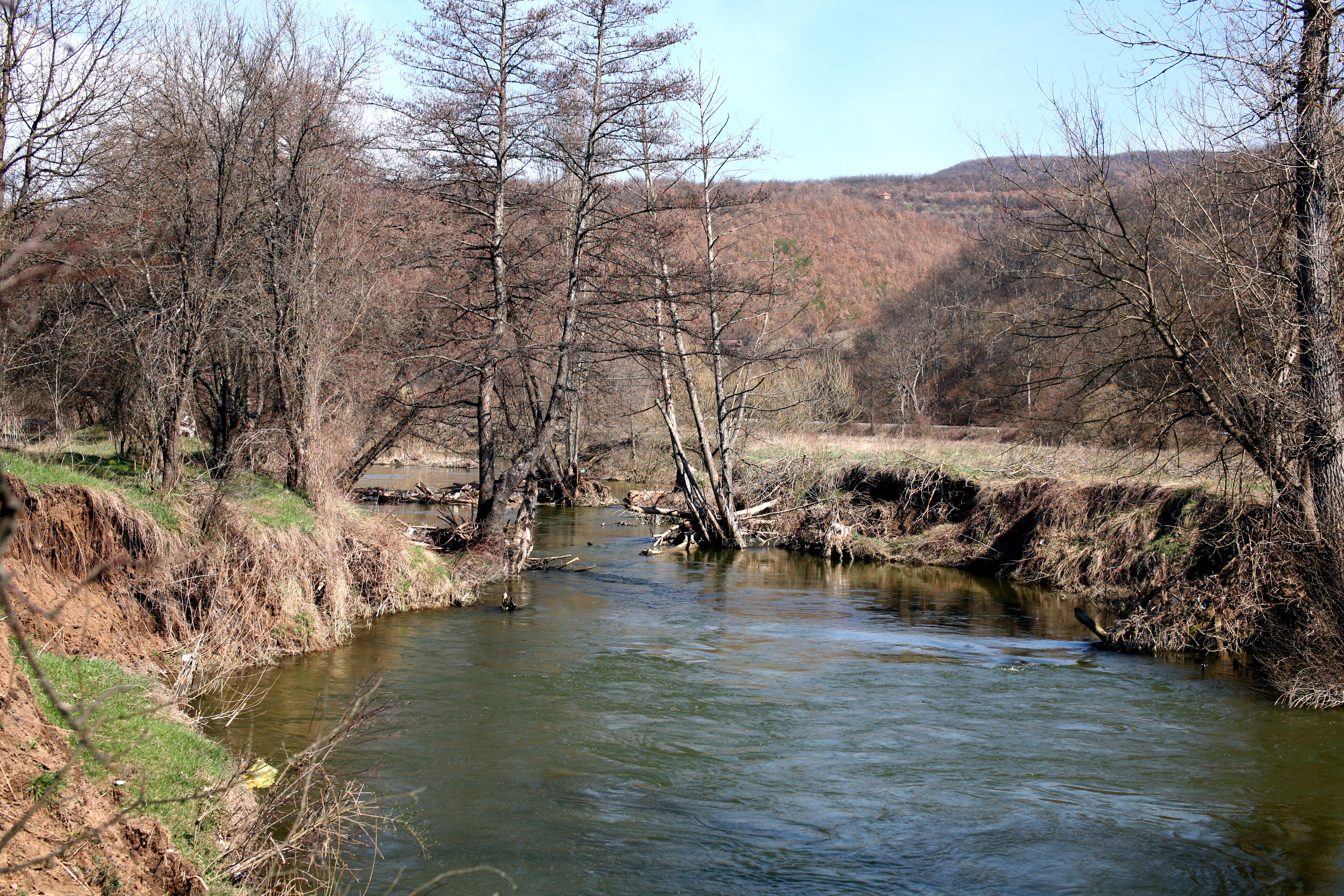

Location
- Country: Bulgaria

Physical characteristics
- Source
  - location: Bohovska Planina
  - coordinates: 42°44′13.92″N 22°30′1.08″E
  - elevation: 1,286 m (4,219 ft)
- Mouth
  - location: Struma
  - coordinates: 42°29′4.92″N 22°45′5.04″E
  - elevation: 595 m (1,952 ft)
- Length: 50 km (31 mi)

Basin features
- Progression: Struma→ Aegean Sea

The Treklyanska reka (Bulgarian: Треклянска река) is a river in western Bulgaria, a right tributary of the Struma. The river is situated in the Kraishte geographical region and is 50 km long. It drains the eastern slopes of the mountain ranges of Karvav Kamak, Milevska Planina and Kobilska Planina, the northern and eastern slopes of the Zemenska Planina, the western and southern slopes of the Penkyovska Planina and the western slopes of the Rudina Planina.

== Geography ==
The river takes its source under the name Melanshtitsa in Bohovska Planina at an altitude of 1,318 m, at 300 m southwest of the summit of Ogorelitsa (1,318 m) on the Bulgaria–Serbia border. Except for two stretches near the villages of Treklyano and Peshtera, it flows in a deep narrow valley. Until the village of Gabreshevtsi it flows southwards between the mountain ranges of Karvav Kamak, Milevska Planina and Kobilska Planina to the west and Penkyovska Planina and Elovishka Planina to the east. Downstream of Gabreshevtsi the river turns east and under the name Rayanska reka passes through the 8.5 m Rayanski Gorge between Penkyovska Planina to the north and Zemenska Planina to the south. After receiving its largest tributary the Yavor, the river turns in direction south–southeast and after 6 km flows into the Struma at an altitude of 595 m in the northern areas of the town of Zemen.

The basin of the Treklyanska reka borders the basins of the rivers Dragovishtitsa to the south, southwest and west and the Svetlya to the east, both right tributaries of the Struma, as well as the drainage basin of the river Erma of the Danube drainage to the north and northwest.

The Sovolyanska Bistritsa has predominantly rain feed with high water in March and low water in September.

== Settlements and transport ==
The river flows entirely in Pernik and Kyustendil Provinces. There are one town and ten villages along its course. In Pernik Province are situated the town of Zemen and the villages of Rayantsi, Kalotintsi, Vranya Stena and Peshtera in Zemen Municipality, as well as Gorna Melna, Dolna Melna and Dalga Luka in Tran Municipality. In Kyustendil Province are located the villages of Kosovo, Treklyano and Gabreshevtsi.

There are two roads of the national network following the valley of the Treklyanska reka. Between Zemen and Gabreshevtsi passes a 15.8 km section of the third class III-623 road Dupnitsa–Bobov Dol–Zemen–Gabreshevtsi and between Treklyano and Gabreshevtsi there is a 5 km stretch of the third class III-637 road Tran–Treklyano–Dragovishtitsa.
