= Kraishte =

Geographical region in Bulgaria and Serbia

Kraishte Краище (Bulgarian) Краjиште / Krajište (Serbian)
- Geographical and historical region
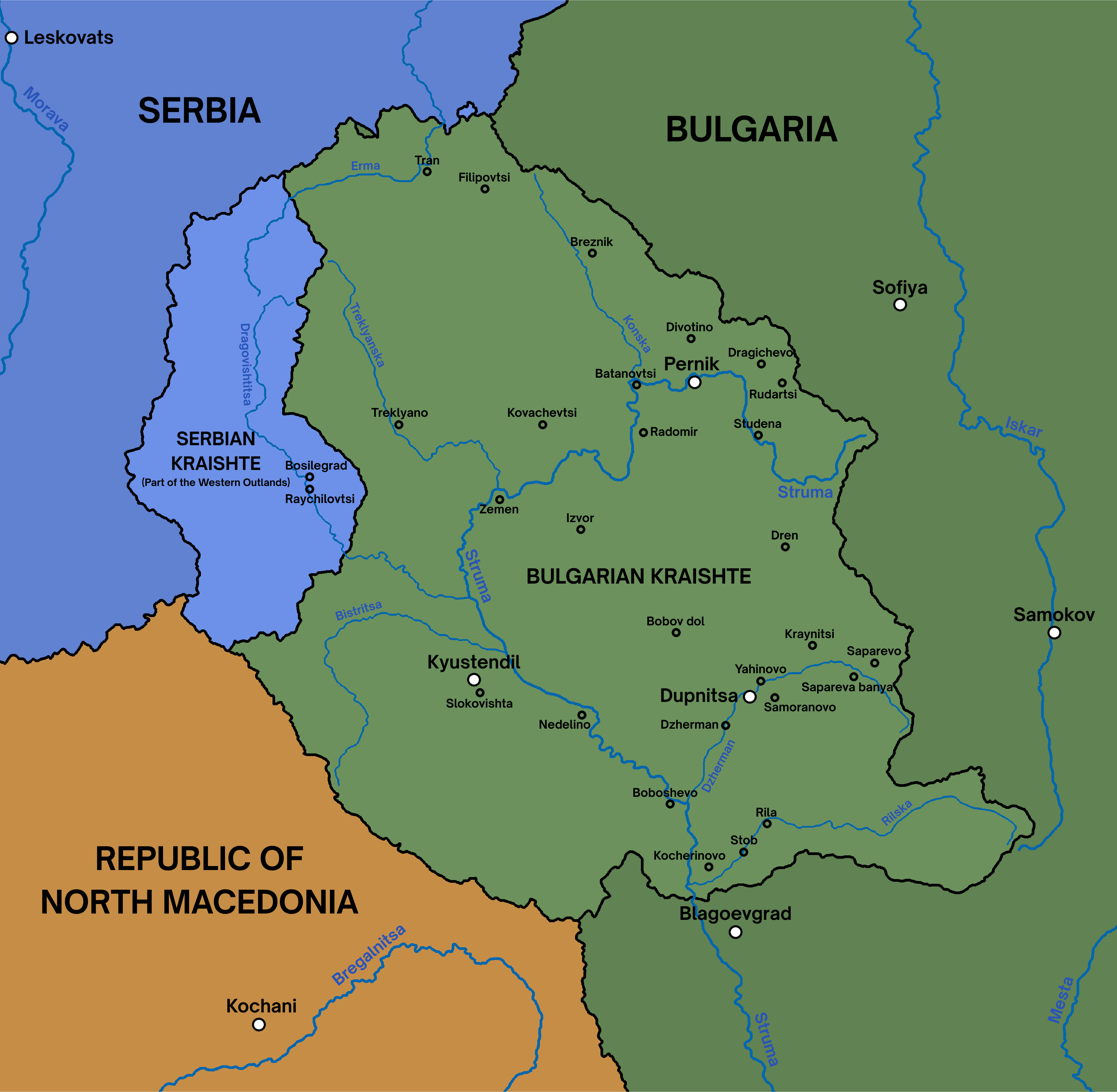
- Map of Kraishte
- Country: Bulgaria; Serbia
- Largest city: Pernik

Area
  - Total: 6,361 km^{2} (2,456 sq mi)

Population (2021 est.)
  - Total: 232,640
  - Density: 36.57/km^{2} (94.72/sq mi)

Kraishte (Bulgarian: Краище, sometimes with a definite article Краището, Kraishteto) or Krajište (Serbian: Крајиште) is a geographical and historical region split between southwestern Bulgaria and southeastern Serbia.

== Geography ==
Geographically, Kraishte is a mosaic of highlands and mountains of low to medium height, interspersed with high valleys. To the west, the region is delimited by the valley of the South Morava in Serbia. To the north Kraishte includes the Znepole area with the valley of the Jerma and reaches the Svetlya valley and the Radomir basin. To the east and south are the Dupnitsa and Kyustendil basins respectively, in which the Dzherman and Struma rivers separate it from the higher mountains of Rila and Osogovo. To the southwest, it extends to the Kriva River in North Macedonia.

The highest summit of Kraishte is the Besna Kobila mountain in Serbia (1,922 m); the border mountain of Karvav Kamak includes the highest point of the region in Bulgaria, Bilo (1,737 m). The Bulgarian part of the region includes 23 small mountain ranges in two grouping: the Ruy-Verila range encompassing Miloslavska planina (1,485 m), Ruy (1,706 m), Ezdimirska Planina (1,219 m), Strazha (1,385 m), Lyubash (1,398 m), Bohovska planina (1,318 m), Karvav Kamak (1,737 m), Leshnikovska Planina (1,086 m), Elovishka Planina (1,329 m), Penkyovska Planina (1,187 m), Lyulyak (1,324 m), Erulska Planina (1,481 m), Cherna Gora (1,129 m), Golo Bardo (1,158 m) and Verila (1,415 m) and the Milevsko-Konyavska range consisting of Milevska planina (1,733 m), Izvorska Planina (1,243 m), Kobilska Planina (1,356 m), Chudinska Planina (1,497 m), Lisets (1,500 m), Zemenska Planina (1,295 m), Rudina Planina (1,172 m) and Konyavska Planina (1,487 m).

There is only one nature reserve — Ostritsa, situated in Golo Bardo mountain range.

Major towns in Kraishte include Tran and Zemen in Bulgaria, and Bosilegrad in Serbia.

In Serbian geography, the region is regularly treated together with the neighbouring Vlasina as "Vlasina and Krajište".

=== Climate ===
Kraishte has a moderate, relatively cool continental climate. Warm air masses from the Mediterranean are mostly blocked by the Osogovo, Doganica and Dukat mountains. Instead, the prevailing winds blow from the north. Winters are long and often bitterly cold; the northeasterly winter wind Kozodero ("the goat flayer") can keep the rivers frozen for months at a time. Springs and autumns are short and summers are relatively cool for the interior of the Balkans. The town of Tran in Kraishte holds the record for the lowest temperature ever measured in Bulgaria, at –38.3 °C.

=== List of mountains ===
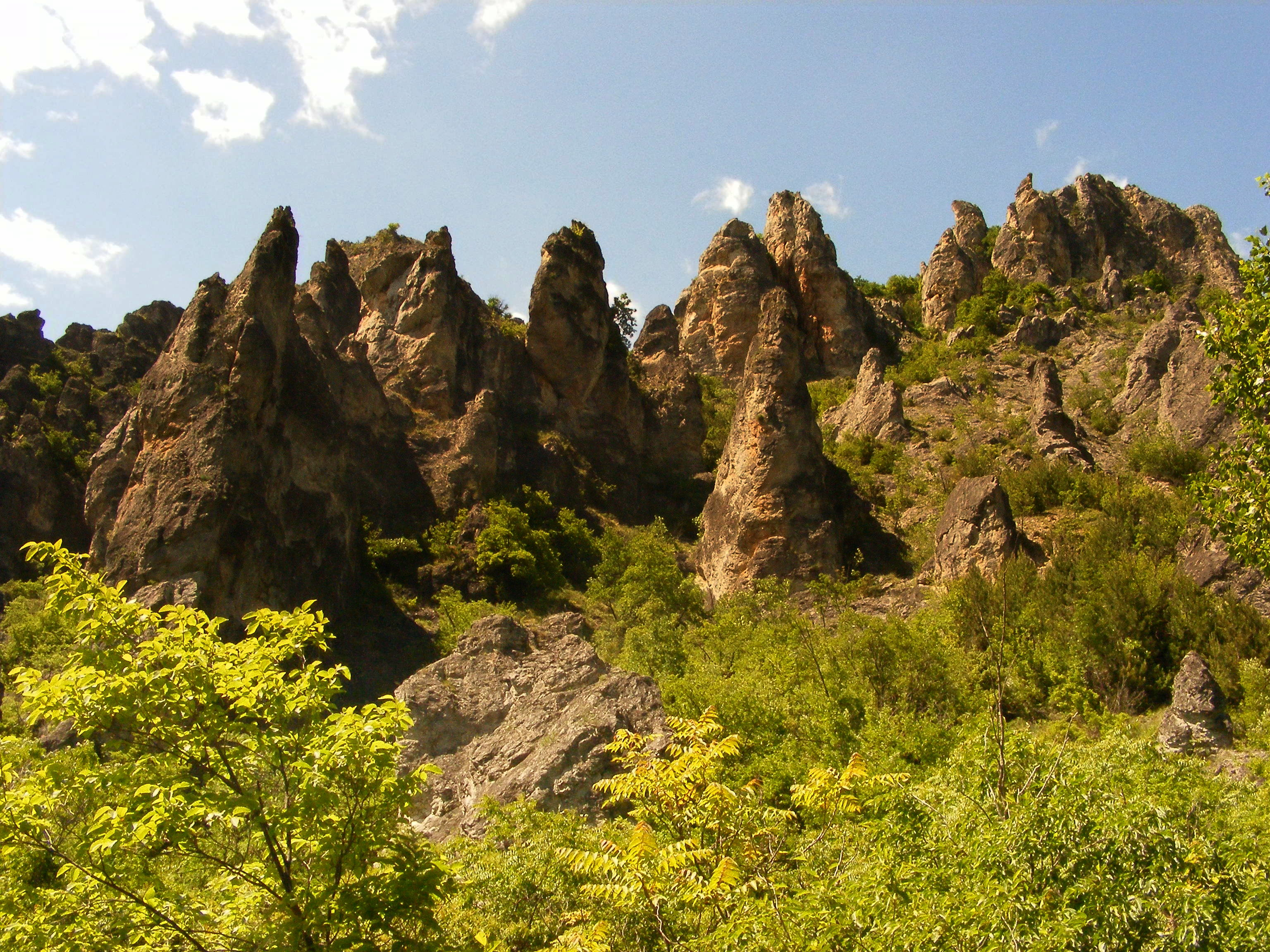
Rock formations in the Shegava River Canyon of the Kyustendil Kraishte in Bulgaria

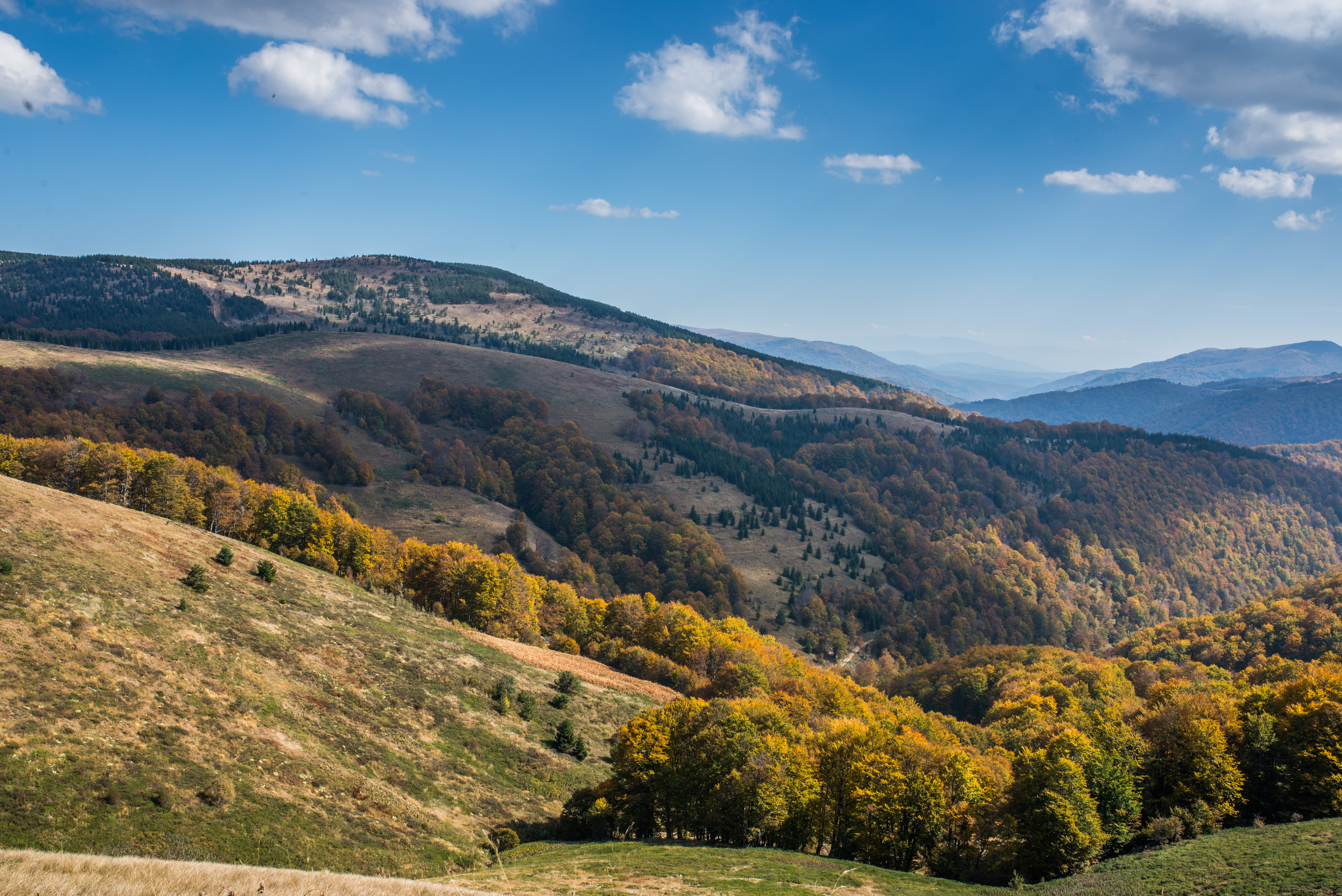
Besna Kobila in Serbia is the highest mountain in Kraishte

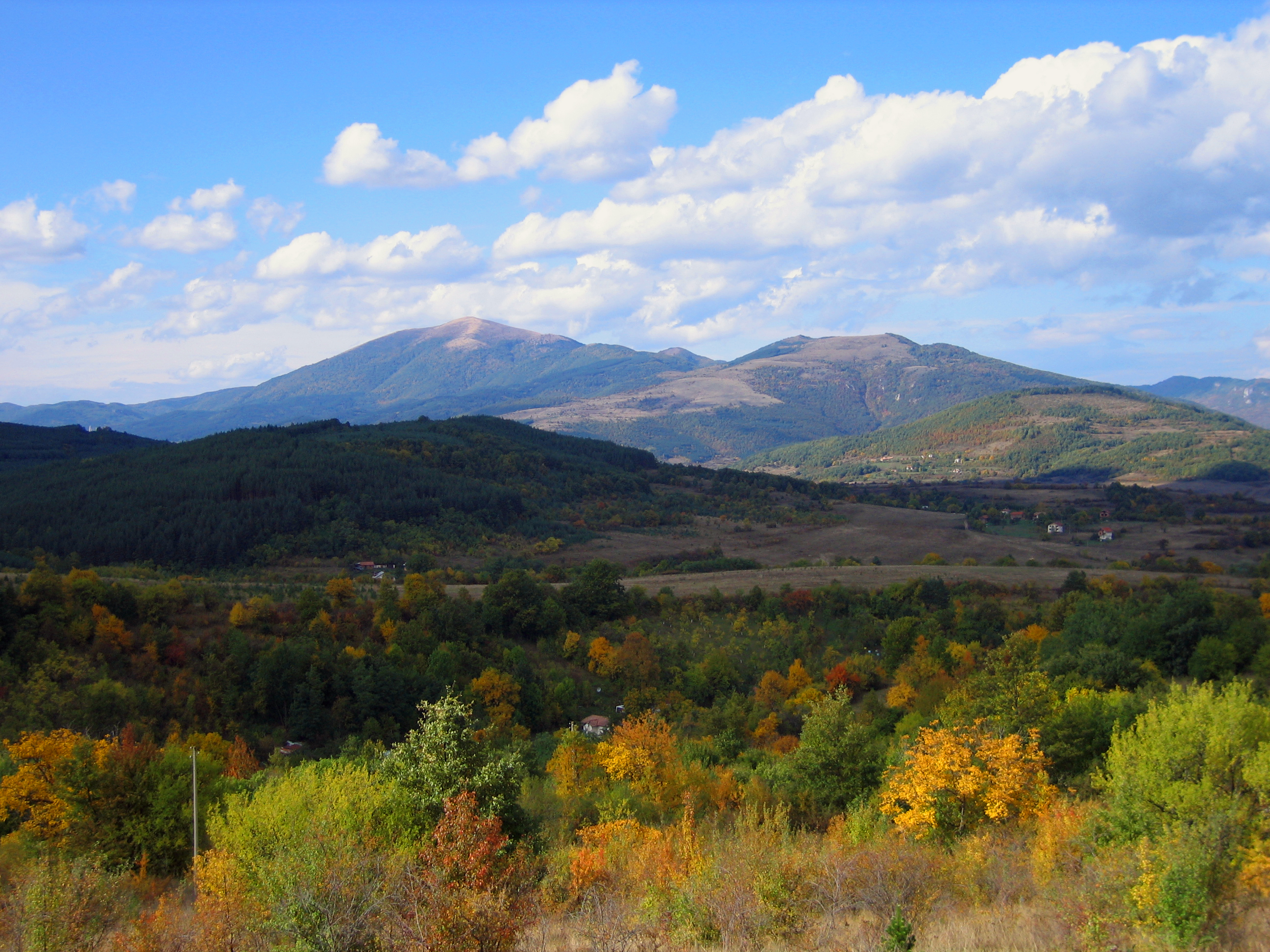
Ruy in Bulgaria

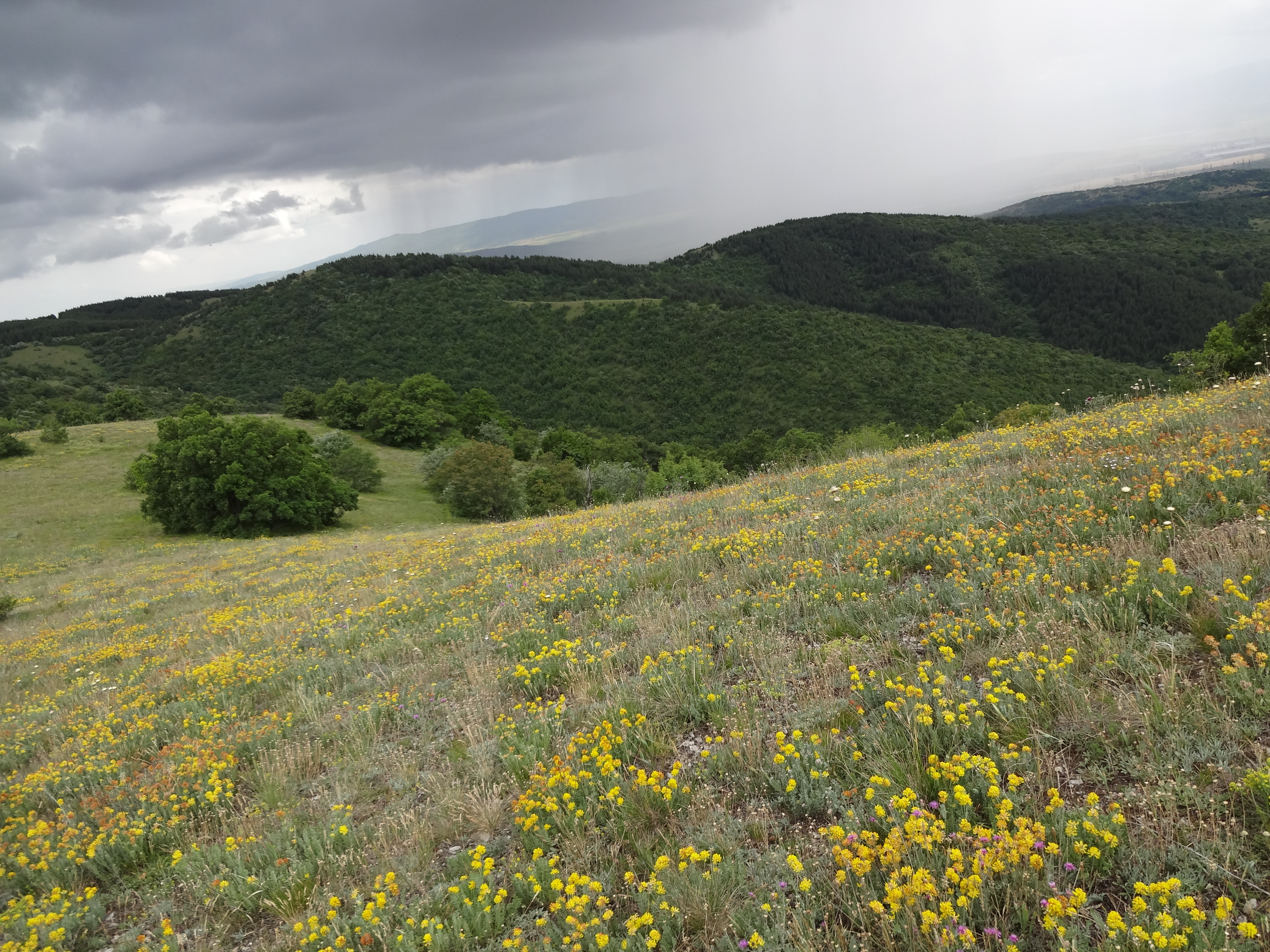
Flower meadows in Golo Bardo, Bulgaria

Mountain	Height	Countries
Miloslavska	1485 m	Bulgaria, Serbia
Ruy / Ruj	1706 m	Bulgaria, Serbia
Bohovska	1318 m	Bulgaria, Serbia
Karvav Kamak / Krvavi Kamik	1737 m	Bulgaria, Serbia
Milevska	1733 m	Bulgaria, Serbia
Izvorska	1243 m	Bulgaria, Serbia
Chudinska / Čudinska	1497 m	Bulgaria, Serbia
Ezdimirska	1219 m	Bulgaria
Strazha	1385 m	Bulgaria
Lyubash	1398 m	Bulgaria
Leshnikovska	1085 m	Bulgaria
Elovishka	1329 m	Bulgaria
Penkyovska	1187 m	Bulgaria
Lyulyak	1324 m	Bulgaria
Erulska	1481 m	Bulgaria
Cherna Gora	1129 m	Bulgaria
Golo Bardo	1158 m	Bulgaria
Kobilska	1356 m	Bulgaria
Lisets	1500 m	Bulgaria
Zemenska	1295 m	Bulgaria
Rudina	1172 m	Bulgaria
Konyavska	1487 m	Bulgaria
Gramada	1719 m	Serbia
Čemernik	1719 m	Serbia
Vardenik	1875 m	Serbia
Besna Kobila	1922 m	Serbia
Dukat	1881 m	Serbia
Lisinska	1829 m	Serbia
Gloška	1756 m	Serbia

== See also ==
- List of regions of Serbia
