= Izvorska Planina =

Mountain range in Kraishte region

- Location within Bulgaria

Highest point
- Elevation: 1,242 m (4,075 ft)
- Coordinates: 42°30′28.8″N 22°32′45.6″E

Naming
- Native name: Изворска планина (Bulgarian)

Geography
- Location: Bulgaria–Serbia border

Izvorska Planina (Bulgarian: Изворска планина) is a mountain range in Kraishte region on the border of western Bulgaria and southeastern Serbia. Its highest summit is Plocha at 1,242 meters above sea level. It is part of the Milevska-Konyavska range.

From north to south, its length is 12 km; its width is up to 8 km. To the southwest and south, the valley of the river Dragovishtitsa, a right tributary of the Struma, separates it from the Dukat and Chudinska mountain ranges. To the east, the valley of the Uyneshtitsa river, a left tributary of the Dragovishtitsa, separates it from Zemenska Planina; to the northeast, through a 1,148 m high saddle, it connects to Kobilska Planina. To the north, via the Slavcheto saddle (960 m) on the border with Serbia, it connects to Milevska Planina.

The ridge of the mountain is flat and hilly with rounded summits, the highest being Plocha (1242.2 m), located at border pyramid No. 140, about 1 km west of the outer hamlets of the village Gorni Koriten.

The predominant soils are brown forest and cinnamon forest soils. Izvorska Planina is covered with deciduous forests.
