= Lyubash =

Mountain range in Bulgaria

Highest point
- Elevation: 1,399 m (4,590 ft)
- Coordinates: 42°45′21.6″N 22°45′14.1″E

Naming
- Native name: Любаш (Bulgarian)

Geography
- Location within Bulgaria
- Location: Bulgaria

Lyubash (Bulgarian: Любаш) is a mountain range in Kraishte region of western Bulgaria with an altitude of 1,399 meters above sea level. It is part of the Ruy-Verila range.

It descends to the Breznik Valley to the southeast; to the north and northeast the valley of the river Yablanitsa, a tributary of the Erma, separates it from the small mountain ranges of Strazha and Zavalska Planina; to the west the valley of the Svetlya, a tributary of the river Struma serves as the boundary with the Erulska Planina. To the southeast a 830 m saddle links it with Cherna Gora. Its length in northwest–southeast direction is 15 km, and the width is 7 km.

Its crest is formed by separate protruding dome-shapes summits, the highest being Lyubash, also known as Momin Dvor or Pleshivets (1399 m), situated in its northernmost part. Its height gradually decreases further south, where it descends into low hills. Lyubash is built up of Jurassic limestones with karst surface. The main watershed ridge of the Balkan Peninsula, separating the Black Sea drainage basin to the north and the Aegean Sea one to the south, runs along the mountain range. The predominant soils are cinnamon and brown forest soils. It is covered with patches of deciduous forests and extensive pastures.

There are 12 villages in the Lyubash and on its slopes: Banishte, Begunovtsi, Breznishki Izvor, Gigintsi, Dolna Sekirna, Kosharevo, Krivonos, Lyalintsi, Rebro, Razhavets, Sadovik and Stanyovtsi. A 2.9 km section of the second class II-63 road Pernik–Breznik–Tran–Strezimirovtsi runs through its northeastern foothills.

In clear days from its summit there are views to the major mountain ranges of Vitosha, Viskyar, Rila and the Balkan Mountains, as well as the neightbouring Strazha and Zavalska Planina.
