= Kobilska Planina =

Mountain range in western Bulgaria

- Location within Bulgaria

Highest point
- Elevation: 1,356 m (4,449 ft)
- Coordinates: 42°30′46.8″N 22°36′36″E

Naming
- Native name: Кобилска планина (Bulgarian)

Geography
- Location: Bulgaria

Kobilska Planina (Bulgarian: Кобилска планина) is a mountain range in Kraishte region in western Bulgaria. It is part of the Milevska–Konyavska mountain chain system.

Kobilska is situated between the valley of the Treklyanska reka, a right tributary of the river Struma, that separates it from the Penkyovska Planina to the northeast, the valley of the Dobridolska reka, a right tributary of the Treklyanska reka, that separates it from the Zemenska Planina to the southeast, and the valley of the Bazovichka reka, a right tributary of the Treklyanska reka, that separates it from the Milevska Planina to the north and northwest. To the west a 1,148 m saddle links it to the Izvorska Planina. Its length is about 10 km; the width is 6 km. The highest summit is Beli Kamak (1,356 m), situated 2 km west of the village of Gabreshevtsi.

In the mountain range is located entirely in Kyustendil Province. There are seven villages on its slopes — Brest, Gabreshevtsi, Gorni Koriten, Dolni Koriten, Sushitsa, Treklyano and Ushi.

Along its eastern foothills between Treklyano and Sushitsa passes a 11.8 km section of the third class III-637 road Tran, Bulgaria–Treklyano–Dragovishtitsa.
