= Strazha (mountain) =

Mountain range in Bulgaria

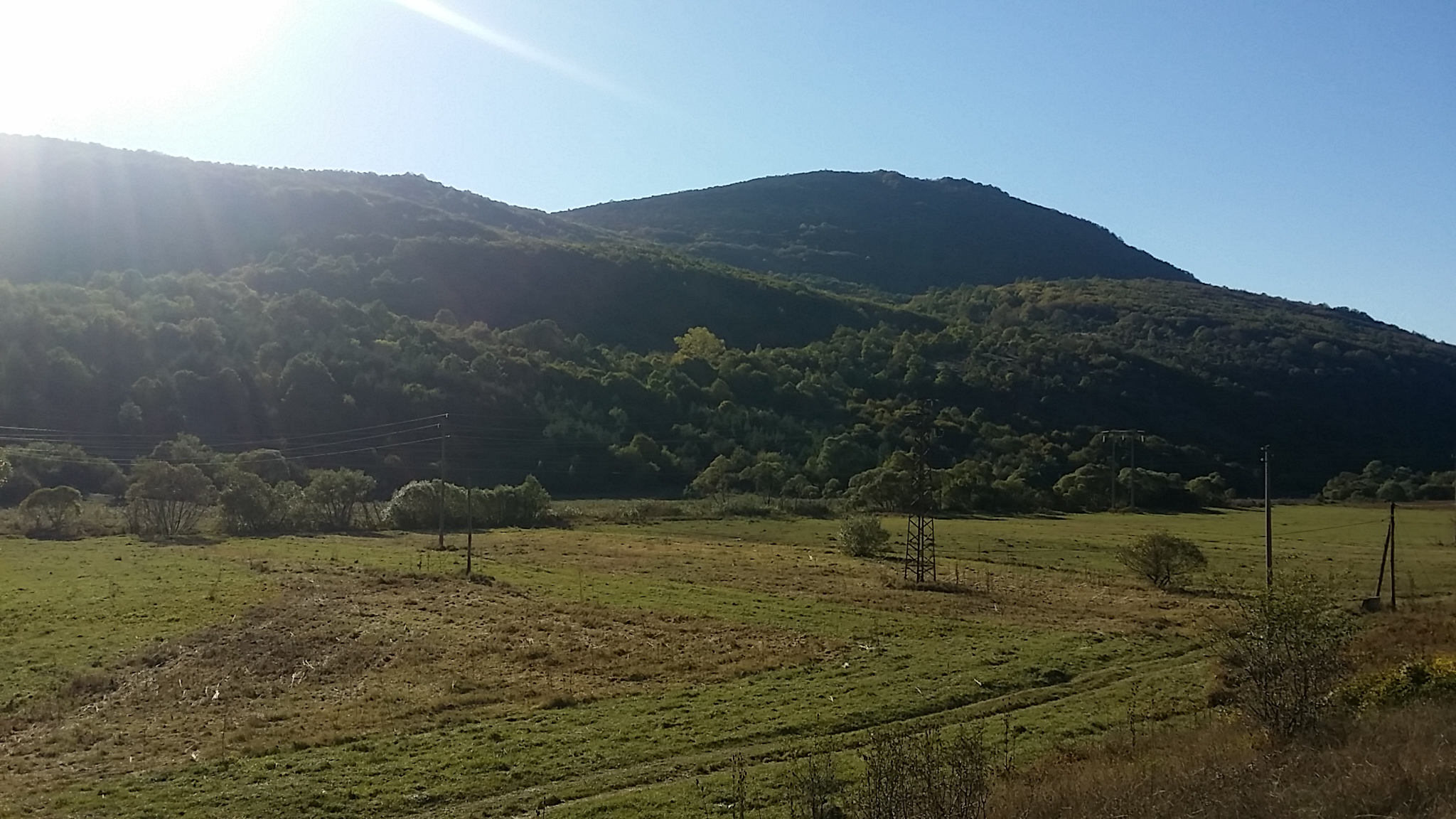

Highest point
- Elevation: 1,389 m (4,557 ft)
- Coordinates: 42°46′40.8″N 22°43′40.8″E

Naming
- Native name: Стража (Bulgarian)

Geography
- Location within Bulgaria
- Location: Bulgaria

Strazha (Bulgarian: Стража) is a small monoclinal mountain range in Kraishte region of western Bulgaria with an altitude of 1,389 meters above sea level. It is part of the Ruy-Verila range. It is sometimes called Paramun Mountain (Паламунска планина) after the village of Paramun.

Strazha is situated between the valleys of the rivers Yablanitsa, a tributary of the Erma river, and Velinovska a left tributary of the Yablanitsa, which separate it from the mountain ranges of Zavalska Planina to the northeast, Lyubash to the south, Lyulyak to the west and Ezdimirska Planina to the north. Its length in northwest–southeast direction is 5 km, and the width is 3 km. Within these boundaries the mountain range covers a territory of 24 km^{2}.

Strazha is made up of thickly jointed Jurassic limestones. This lithological structure has contributed to the development of karst relief (sinkholes, whirlpools, etc.), especially widespread in the northern part of the range around the summits of Drenova Glava (1,084 m) and Guglin Vortop (1,079 m). The highest point of the mountain range, the summit of Strazha, also called Golemi Peak, (1,389 m), is located in the southern part of its monolithic crest.

The vegetation cover consists mainly of shrubs and meadows, largely resembling its neighbouring ranges of Ezdimirska and Lyubash. The slopes of Strazha are almost bare with occasional oak woods; crest is devoid of forest vegetation and is covered with drought-resilient grass formations. In many places, mainly at the foothills, there are young pine plantations.

Strazha is an arid mountain with small temporary streams. Significant part of the precipitation is lost in the numerous sinkholes that dot the mountain range, and emerges at the foot in the form of small karst springs, which have a highly variable, unstable flow rate.
