= Elovishka Planina =

- Location within Bulgaria

Highest point
- Elevation: 1,329 m (4,360 ft)
- Coordinates: 42°42′32.4″N 22°33′43.2″E

Naming
- Native name: Еловишка планина (Bulgarian)

Geography
- Location: Bulgaria

Elovishka Planina (Bulgarian: Еловишка планина) is a mountain range in Kraishte region of western Bulgaria with an altitude of 1,329 meters above sea level. It is part of the Ruy-Verila range.

The mountain has the shape of an isosceles triangle, with its apex facing northwest. Its length is about 16 km and the width reaches a maximum of 7 km. To the north the valley of the river Leshnikovitsa, a right tributary of the Erma, separates it from the Leshnikovska Planina; to the west the upper course of the same river and the Valcha Polyana Saddle (1,105 m) form the boundary with the Bohovska Planina. To the east the valleys of the rivers Mramorska, a tributary of the Leshnikovska, and Yavor from the Struma basin separate it from the Erulska Planina and to the south a 1,049 m saddle links it to the Penkyovska Planina.

Its highest point is the summit of Plocha (1,329 m). The Elovishka Planina is built up of crystalline rocks and quartzites. The main watershed ridge of the Balkan Peninsula, separating the Black Sea drainage basin to the north and the Aegean Sea one to the south, runs in direction west–east along the mountain range. he predominant soils are brown forest soils. It is covered with extensive deciduous forests dominated by European beech (Fagus sylvatica).

In the interior of the mountain range is located the small village of Elovitsa, which gives its name to the mountain. On the slopes are situated seven villages: Vidrar, Vukan, Gorochevtsi, Kosturintsi, Leva Reka, Mramor and Staychovtsi. A 16.9 km section of the third class III-637 road Tran–Treklyano–Dragovishtitsa runs through its eastern foothills between Vukan and Vidrar.
