= Leshnikovska Planina =

Mountain range in Bulgaria

- Location within Bulgaria

Highest point
- Elevation: 1,086 m (3,563 ft)
- Coordinates: 42°47′2.4″N 22°34′26.4″E

Naming
- Native name: Лешниковска планина (Bulgarian)

Geography
- Location: Bulgaria

Leshnikovska Planina (Bulgarian: Лешниковска планина) is a small mountain range in Kraishte region of western Bulgaria with an altitude of 1,086 meters above sea level. It is part of the Ruy-Verila range.

It is an egg-shaped mountain with a length in southwest–northeast direction is 6 km, and the width is 5 km. To the west, north and east its slopes descend steeply to the valley of Znepole on the river Erma. To the south the river Leshnikovitsa, a right tributary of the Erma, separate it from the Elovishka Planina. Its highest point, the summit of Zlataritsa (1,086 m), rises in the middle of the range, west of the village of Studen Izvor. It is covered with deciduous forests.

There are seven villages on the slopes of Leshnikovska Planina: Berayntsi, Kosturintsi, Leshnikovtsi, Radovo, Staychovtsi, Studen Izvor and Yarlovtsi.
