= Zhana Nikolova-Gŭlŭbova =

Bulgarian philology scientist

Zhana Nikolova-Gŭlŭbova Bulgarian Philology scientist
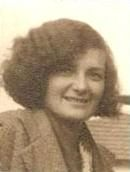
- Zhana Nikolova in 1934
- Born: February 22, 1908; Tran, Bulgaria
- Died: October 14, 2009 (aged 101)
- Resting place: Central Sofia Cemetery, Sofia
- Education: Sofia University
- Known for: Philology scientist, Bulgarian essayist, publicist, Honorary Doctor Honoris Causa

Zhana Nikolova-Gŭlŭbova (1908–2009) was a Bulgarian philology scientist, essayist and publicist. She was an author of literary and linguistic research, and philosophical essays. Her main scientific interests were in the field of literary criticism and lexicography. She was also a certified translator and editor. She was the first woman teaching at Sofia University. She was awarded the highest honorary degree of the Bulgarian Academy of Sciences, 'Doctor Honoris Causa'. She died in 2009, aged 101.

== Life path ==
Nikolova-Gŭlŭbova was born on 22 February 1908 in Tran. Her mother was an artist, and her father was a teacher. In 1911, her family moved to Tsaribrod. In 1912, the family moved to Sofia as refugees because of the Balkan War. There, she completed her lower secondary education and then attended the Second Girls' High School, classical department. In 1926, she began studying German philology at Sofia University. She graduated in 1931 with German philology as her major and classical philology as her additional field.

In 1936, the publishing house "Hemus" released Nikolova-Gŭlŭbova's first book, "The tongue of young Goethe". In the same year, she was selected in a competition to become a teacher at the same university, making her the first woman in Bulgarian History to teach at university.

With the support of Elin Pelin and Yordan Yovkov, Nikolova-Gŭlŭbova became a member of the Writer's Union of Bulgaria. In 1945, she was later accused of spreading fascist propaganda by the communist government and removed from lecturing in the university, as well as removed from the Writer Union and prohibited from publishing any literary works.

In 1999, Nikolova-Gŭlŭbova was awarded an honorary 'Doctor Honoris Causa' degree from the Bulgarian Academy of Sciences.

== Creative path ==
Nikolova-Gŭlŭbova is one of the essential figures in the development of Bulgarian essayists. Her name is often associated with others famous Bulgarian authors like Elisaveta Bagryana and Dora Gabe.

Nikolova-Gŭlŭbova mainly specializes in German authors. She produced many analysis works on Yordan Yovkov, Ekaterina Nencheva, Ivan Vazov, Dimcho Debelyanov, and Atanas Dalchev.

Nikolova-Gŭlŭbova's dictionaries later proved fundamental in devising Bulgarian-German thesaurus and dictionaries. She had been actively writing over a period of 60 years, publishing more than 20,000 articles.
