= Ezdimirska Planina =

Mountain range in Bulgaria

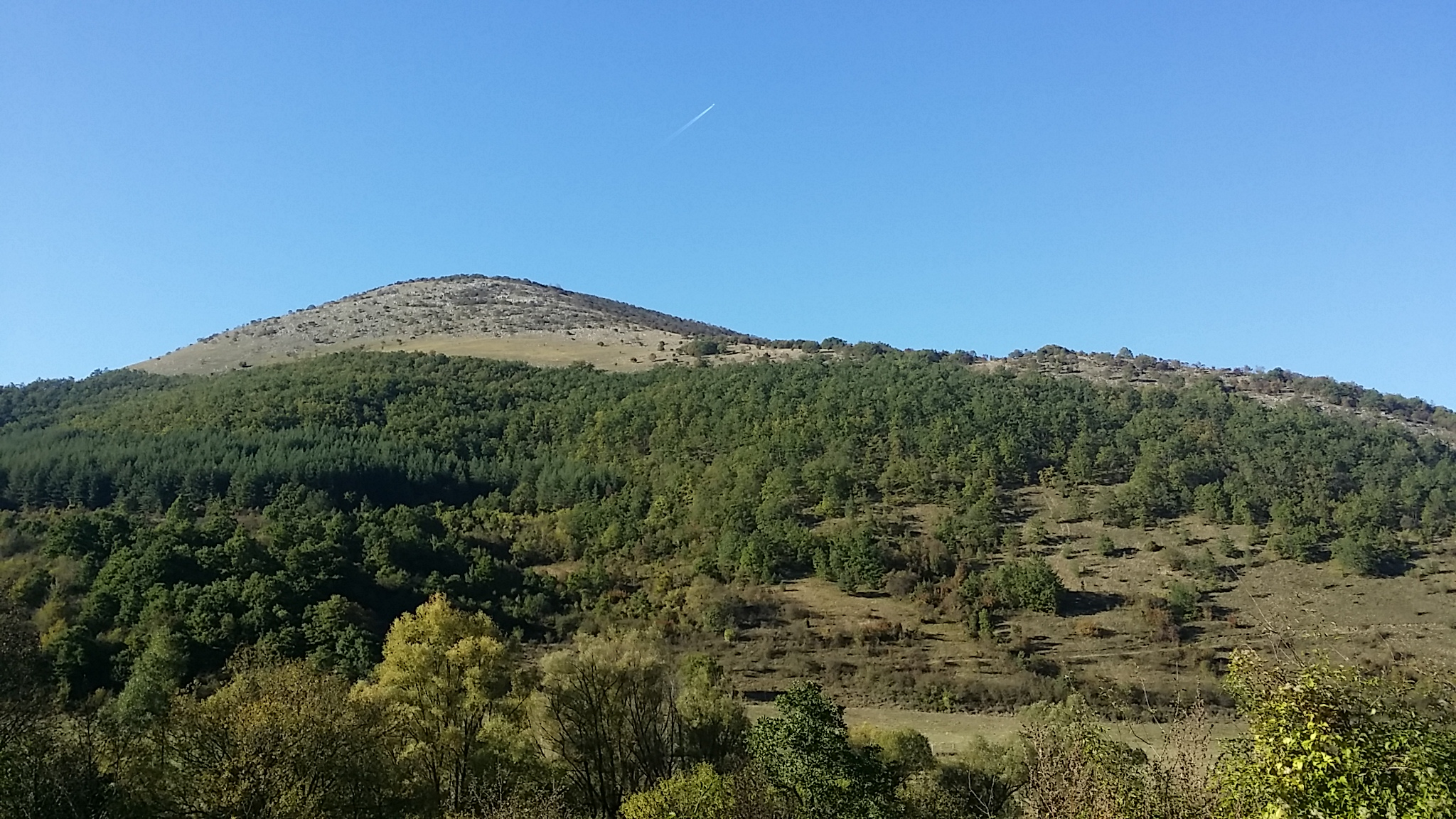

Highest point
- Elevation: 1,219 m (3,999 ft)
- Coordinates: 42°48′54″N 22°42′7.2″E

Naming
- Native name: Ездимирска планина (Bulgarian)

Geography
- Location within Bulgaria
- Location: Bulgaria

Ezdimirska Planina (Bulgarian: Ездимирска планина) is a small mountain range in Kraishte region of western Bulgaria with an altitude of 1,219 meters above sea level. It is part of the Ruy-Verila range.

Ezdimirska Planina is situated to southeast of the town of Tran. From the north and east it reaches the valleys of the rivers Yablanitsa (a tributary of the Erma river) and Velinovska. Its length in northwest–southeast direction is 5 km, and reaches a maximum width of 3 km, making it one of the smallest mountain ranges in Bulgaria.
