= Hemus =

Hemus may refer to:

- Hemus (crab), a genus of spider crabs
- Haemus, a Thracian king in Greek mythology
- Haemus Mons, ancient name of the Balkan Mountains (Bulgaria)
- Hemus Air, a Bulgarian airline
- Hemus (publishing house), a Bulgarian publishing house
- Hemus motorway, designated A2, a partially built motorway in Bulgaria
- Hemus Peak, a peak on Livingston Island, in the South Shetland Islands of Antarctica

== People with the surname ==
- Solly Hemus (1923–2017), an American professional baseball infielder, manager, and coach in Major League Baseball
- Geraldine Hemus (1876–1969), a New Zealand lawyer
- Lancelot Hemus (1881–1933) was a New Zealand cricketer
