= Karvav Kamak =

- Location within Bulgaria

Highest point
- Elevation: 1,737 m (5,699 ft)
- Coordinates: 42°40′58.8″N 22°27′57.6″E

Naming
- Native name: Кървав камък (Bulgarian)

Geography
- Location: Bulgaria–Serbia border

Karvav Kamak (Bulgarian: Кървав камък), meaning Bloody Stone, is a small mountain range in Kraishte region on the border of western Bulgaria and southeastern Serbia. Its highest summit is Bilo, rising 1,737 meters above sea level. It is part of the Ruy-Verila range.

From north to south, its length is about 18–19 km, and its width is up to 10 km. To the north, through the saddle Vargavitsa (1,285 m) it is connected to Bohovska planina, and to the south through a 1605 m saddle, to Tsarichka Planina. To the west in Serbia, it extends to the valleys of the rivers Erma and Božička (left tributary of the Dragovishtitsa in the Struma river basin); to the east the valley of the Treklyanska River (right tributary of the Struma) separates it from the mountain range Penkyovska Planina.

The ridge of the mountain runs from north to south and is highly undulating with an average altitude of 1,500–1,700 m, with a sharp decline in the southeast. The highest point of the mountain is Bilo (1737.1 m), located at border pyramid 167, which is also the highest peak of the entire Bulgarian part of Kraishte.

Karvav Kamak is formed of Paleozoic metamorphic rocks — amphibolite, schists, phyllite. Along the ridge in its northern part runs part of the main watershed of the Balkan Peninsula between the Black and the Aegean Seas. The rivers of Erma (of the Black Sea watershed) and Treklyanska (of the Aegean Sea watershed) originate from Karvav Kamak. The climate is continental. The main soils are brown forest and cinnamon forest soils. For the most part, the mountain is covered with deciduous forests of beech, oak, hornbeam and maple.
