= Dalga Luka =

Small village in Bulgaria

Coordinates: 42°39′N 22°33′E

Dalga Luka is a village in Tran Municipality in western Bulgaria. It is a small village with a permanent population of about 10 people. It is situated in a narrow valley approximately 30 km (19 mi) from the town of Tran. Dalga Luka is situated at about 850 meters above sea level.

The geographical coordinates of Dalga Luka are approximately 42.6417° to North and 22.5575° to East.

The village of Dalga Luka has an Orthodox Church known as "St. Petka" where annual gathering is organized during festivals.
