= Sveshtnik =

Peak in Bulgaria

Svesthnik (Свещник)
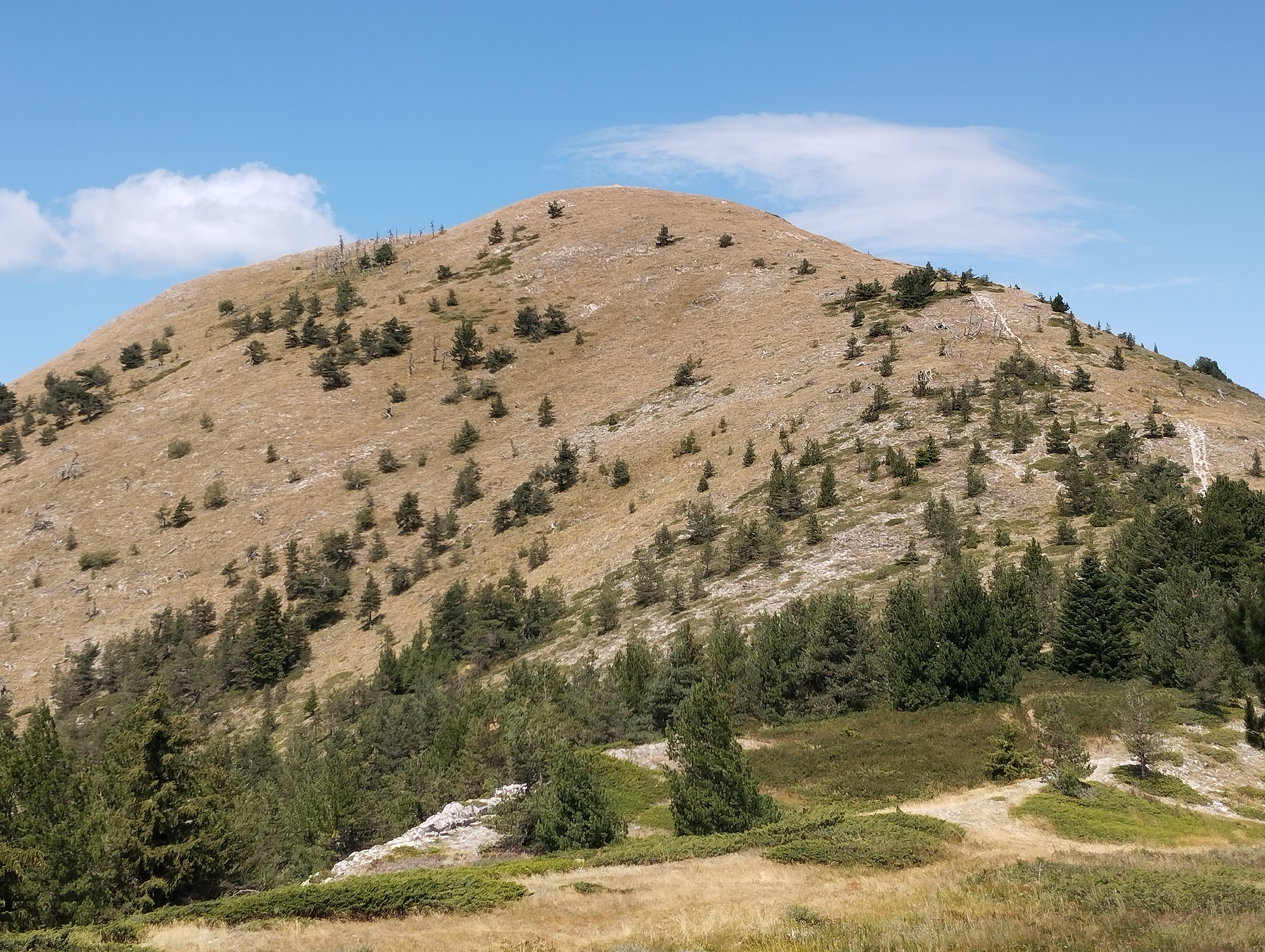

Highest point
- Elevation: 1,975 m (6,480 ft)
- Coordinates: 41°31′18″N 23°37′45″E

Geography
- Location: Blagoevgrad Province, Bulgaria
- Parent range: Pirin Mountains

Svesthnik (Bulgarian: Свещник) is a 1,975 m peak in the Pirin mountain range, south-western Bulgaria, making it the second highest summit in South Pirin after Ushite (1,978 m). It rises on the main mountain ridge to the south of Popovi Livadi saddle and to the north-west of Ushite. Svesthnik is built up of granite and has a conical shape with rounded steep slopes. Its slopes are covered with forests of Scots pine (Pinus sylvestris) and Norway spruce (Picea abies), while the summit itself is bare, covered with subalpine herbaceous vegetation.

Most sources have traditionally referred to Sveshtnik as the highest summit in the southern division of Pirin.
