= Kosharevo =

Coordinates: 42°40′17″N 22°46′26″E

Kosharevo Кошарево
- Village
- Interactive map of Kosharevo
- Province (Oblast): Pernik
- Municipality (Obshtina): Breznik

Government
  - Mayor: Ana Gigova

Area
  - Land: 23,774 km^{2} (9,179 sq mi)
- Elevation: 859 m (2,818 ft)

Population (2024)
  - Total: 178
- Time zone: UTC+2 (EET)
  - Summer (DST): UTC+3 (EEST)
- Postal Code: 2390
- Postal Code: PK

Kosharevo (Bulgarian: Кошарево, also transliterated Kosharevo) is a village in western Bulgaria. It's located in Pernik Province, Breznik Municipality.

The village is famous for its masquerade games, which are held on January 13 and 14. All survakars from the village gather in the square, dressed in scary costumes, masks and bells. A ritual fire is lit to drive away evil forces.

The survakar group of the village of Kosharevo is one of the largest in the Pernik region - over 150 people. The group has participated in the international Surva festival in Pernik since its establishment in 1966. It was the first from Bulgaria to take part in a foreign carnival during the Iron Curtain period.

In Kosharevo is located the museum ‘House of Masks’. It was built in 1870 and is an example of domestic-baroque architecture. It contains an exhibition of masks from the Breznik region and ceilings with unique wood carvings.
