= Ushite =

Mountain peak in Bulgaria

Ushite (Ушите)
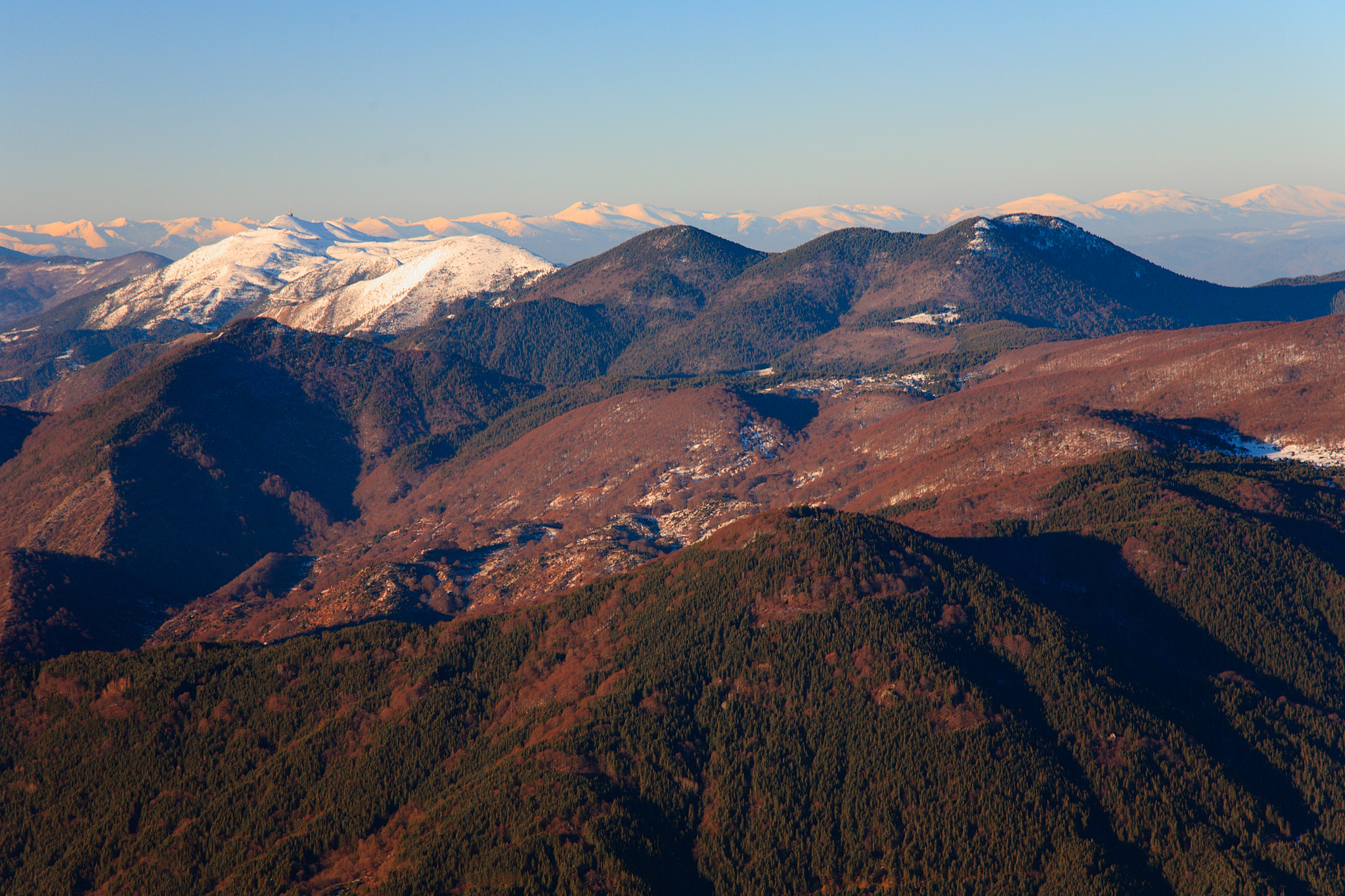

Highest point
- Elevation: 1,978 m (6,490 ft)
- Coordinates: 41°30′38″N 23°38′39″E

Geography
- Location: Blagoevgrad Province, Bulgaria
- Parent range: Pirin Mountains

Ushite (Bulgarian: Ушите [oˈʃitɛ]) is a 1,978 m peak in the Pirin mountain range, south-western Bulgaria, making it the highest summit in South Pirin. It is situated on the main mountain ridge between the peaks of Sveshtnik (1,975 m) and Mutorok (1,971 m). Ushite is covered with forests. In Bulgarian its name means "the ears" and the etymology is linked with the presence of several rock piles on the summit likened to ears.

Most sources have traditionally referred to Sveshtnik as the highest summit in the southern division of Pirin.
