= Lyalintsi =

Lyalintsi Лялинци
- Village
- Location of Lyalintsi
- Coordinates: 42°46′19″N 22°45′36″E
- Country: Bulgaria
- Provinces (Oblast): Pernik

Government
  - Mayor: Stanislav Nikolov
- Elevation: 903 m (2,963 ft)

Population (2005)
  - Total: 43
- Time zone: UTC+2 (EET)
  - Summer (DST): UTC+3 (EEST)
- Postal Code: 2474
- Area code: 07733
- License plate: B

Lyalintsi (Bulgarian: Лялинци) is a village in Tran Municipality, Pernik Province. It is located in western Bulgaria, 65 km from the capital city of Sofia. The village was first mentioned in 1446 as Lelintsi and in 1455 as Lyalintsi. It is derived from the personal name Lyalya, "aunt", the nickname lyalya or lala, itself from Proto-Slavic *l'al'a, "babbler, fool" or from the personal name Lyala, an affectionate form of Vlado (Vladimir, Vladislav).
