= Stargach =

Mountain between Bulgaria and Greece

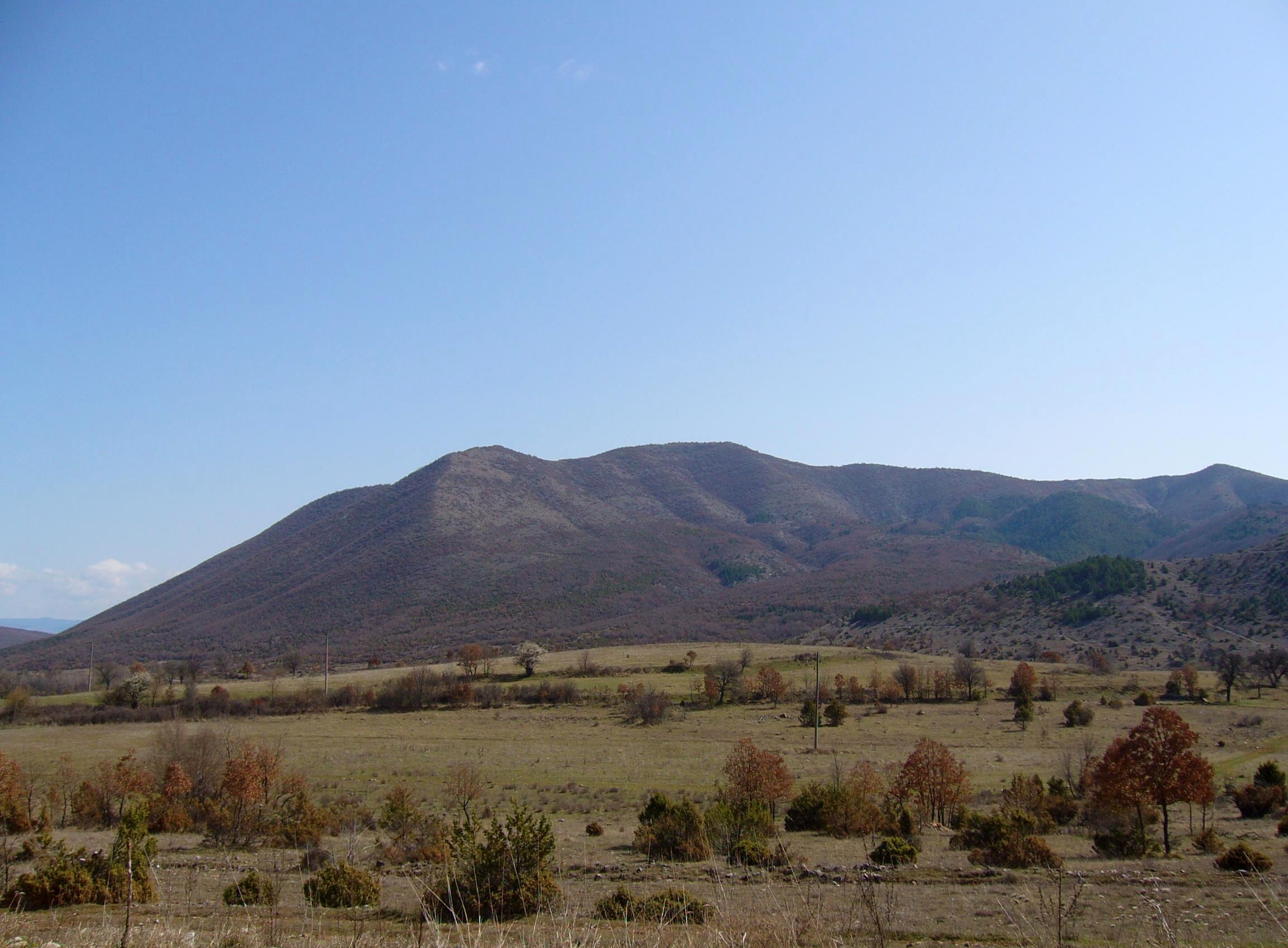
- Stargach as seen from Bulgaria

Highest point
- Elevation: 1,270 m (4,170 ft)
- Coordinates: 41°23′11.75″N 23°46′29.81″E

Naming
- Native name: Стъргач (Bulgarian); Στραγκάτς (Greek)

Geography
- Location: Blagoevgrad, Bulgaria; Drama, Greece
- Parent range: Rhodope Mountains

Geology
- Mountain type: Metamorphic

Climbing
- Easiest route: Hike

Stargach (Bulgarian: Стъргач, Greek: Στραγκάτς), also known as Sturgach or Stargač, is a border mountain, situated between south-western Bulgaria in the Blagoevgrad Province and northern Greece in the Drama region. It is a part of the Rhodope Mountains, sitting east of Slavyanka Mountain and south of the Pirin Mountains.

Stargach has an anticline structure going mostly in the north-south direction. Stargach is composed mostly of various metamorphic rocks–marble and gneiss, as well as feldspar, mica, and quartz minerals. Granitoids within the core of the anticline structure indicate an age for Stargach around the Paleozoic Era, coinciding with the Hercynian orogeny. Granite plutons are also present at Stargach and in the surrounding areas, dated to the Late Cretaceous period, as well as minerals associated with magmatic processes from the Tertiary period in the wider metallogenic zone across the eastern Balkans.

Similarly to Slavyanka Mountain, Stargach has relatively rounded peaks and slopes. Stargach's highest peak lies on the Greek side of the border–Stargach or Kulata peak (Greek: Κουλάτα) with an elevation of 1,270 metres. The highest point of elevation in Bulgaria is Asanov Vrah with an elevation of 1,218 metres.

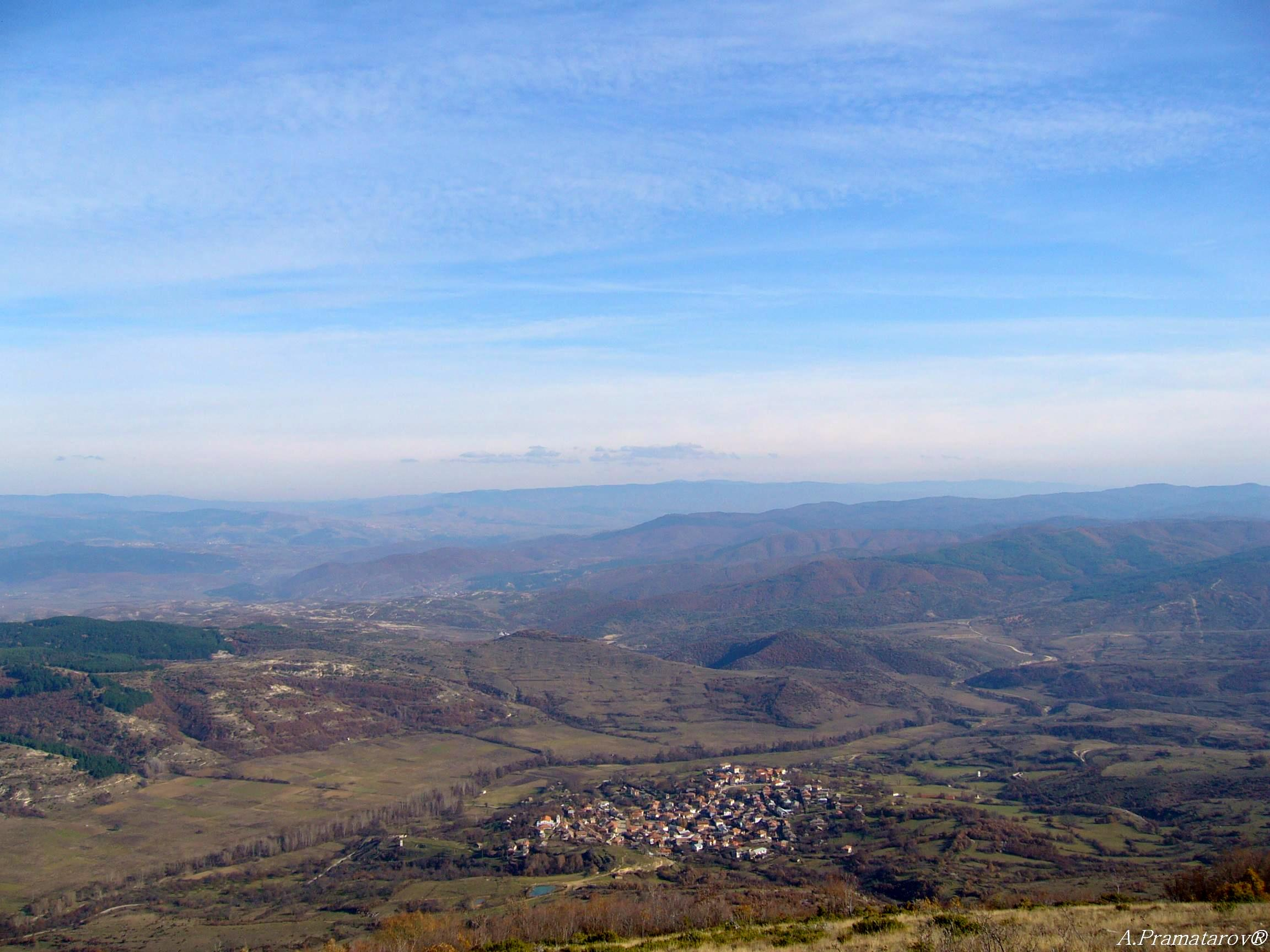
Ilinden village seen from Stargach

The flora of Stargach consists of mainly of bushes and low forests: South European flowering ash (Fraxinus ornus), common hazel (Corylus avellana), common juniper (Juniperus communis), lilac (Syringa spp.), etc. At the highest areas of the mountain grow forests of common beech (Fagus sylvatica).

Nearby villages are Ilinden and Nova Lovcha, which is the main permitted access point.
