= Yarlovtsi =

Village in Southern Bulgaria

Coordinates: 42°48′N 22°33′E

Yarlovtsi or Jarlovci (Bulgarian: Ярловци) is a village in Southern Bulgaria. It is located in Tran municipality, Pernik Province. The village is located 63.75 kilometers away from Sofia. According to 2020 Bulgarian census reports, Yarlovtsi currently has a population of 50 people with a permanent address registration.
