= Miloslavska planina =

Mountain in Serbia

- Location within Serbia

Highest point
- Elevation: 1,486 m (4,875 ft)
- Coordinates: 42°49′30″N 22°26′23″E

Geography
- Location: Bulgaria / Serbia
- Parent range: Rhodope Mountains

Miloslavska planina (Cyrillic: Милославска планина) is a mountain range on the border of Bulgaria and Serbia, near the town of Tran in Bulgaria and Dimitrovgrad in Serbia. Its highest peak, Golema rudina, has an elevation of 1,486 meters above sea level.

== See also ==
- List of mountains in Serbia
