= Dukat (mountain) =

Mountain in Serbia

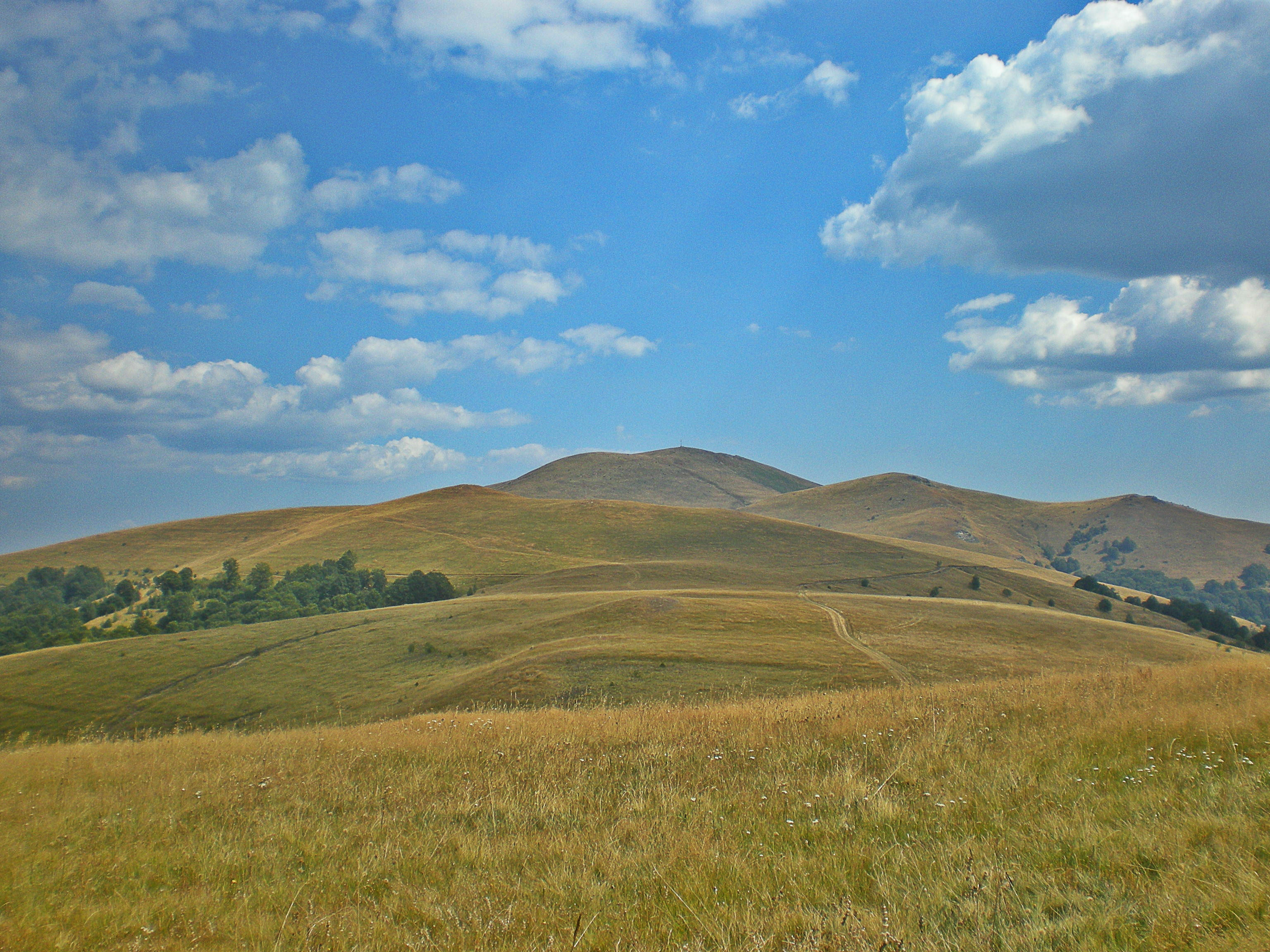

Highest point
- Elevation: 1,881 m (6,171 ft)
- Coordinates: 42°25′31″N 22°23′26″E

Geography
- Location within Serbia
- Location: Southern Serbia
- Parent range: Rhodope Mountains

Dukat (Serbian Cyrillic: Дукат) is a mountain in southern Serbia, near the town of Bosilegrad. Its highest peak Crnook has an elevation of 1,881 m (6,171 ft) above sea level.

== See also ==
- List of mountains in Serbia
