= Gorni Koriten =

Gorni Koriten Горни Коритен
- Village
- Location within Bulgaria
- Coordinates: 42.5044°N 22.5719°E
- Country: Bulgaria
- Province: Kyustendil Province
- Municipality: Treklyano
- Time zone: UTC+2 (EET)
  - Summer (DST): UTC+3 (EEST)

Gorni Koriten is a village in Treklyano Municipality, Kyustendil Province, south-western Bulgaria. The village is located between the mountains Kobilskata (peak Chardack - 1312m), Milevskata (peak Milevets - 1733m) and Penkovkata mountain (Konski peak 1187m).
