= Hemus (publishing house) =

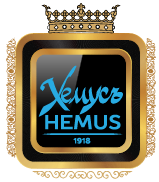
- Status: Active
- Founded: 1918; 107 years ago
- Founder: General Credit Company
- Country of origin: Kingdom of Bulgaria
- Headquarters location: Sofia, Bulgaria
- Key people: Kiril Stoyanov, Executive editor
- Publication types: Book
- Owner(s): Alegzander LLC
- Official website: http://alegzander.com/

Hemus (Bulgarian: "Хемус", written in pre-1945 Bulgarian alphabet with the letter "Ъ": "Хемусъ" or Haemus) is a Bulgarian publishing house. It was first founded as a joint-stock company in 1918 in the Kingdom of Bulgaria (Tsardom of Bulgaria), in Sofia, by General Credit Company and few members of the Democratic Party.

== History ==
=== 1918–1947 ===
Hemus grew up as the most significant Bulgarian publishing house at that time (especially after the bankruptcy of "Alexander Paskalev & Co Publishing" (1908–1921), bankrupted due to the major spelling reform in the Bulgarian language in 1921). By the end of its activity in 1948, it has registered a stable publishing activity and financial profit. During 1921–1930 the company had held the third place of the publishing business in Bulgaria. During 1931–1944 its business had fallen to the fifth place.

In the initial phase of its existence, Hemus publishing house had published mainly foreign authors (1918–1920 – 62% of the production).

In 1921–1930, Hemus ranked third among the Bulgarian publishing houses with its 129 foreign titles. 1931–1944 stood at fifth place mostly by publishing children's literature. At that time the Bulgarian authors prevailed in the publishing policy of Hemus. Its business has been orientated towards the children's and youth audiences turned out to be favorable for the publishing house. The carefully selected titles, their low price and the well-developed distribution network generated the success of Hemus. The publishing house was strictly following the state requirements and standards at that time. This encouraged a good market for the children's book in the post-war situation, unemployment and reduced demand.

The rising revenues and the stabilization of the Bulgarian economy after the end of the First World War led the editor Hristo Hadzhiev to prominent authors, to the best foreign literature translators, which were attracted by correct business and financial relations.

=== Shoemaker Award (1932) ===
In 1932, Hemus publishing house was awarded with the "Shoemaker" Prize during the Second International Book Exhibition in Brussels for G. Atanasov's illustrations of the book "Maiden Unborn" by Ran Bosilek.

=== 1947–1989 ===
In 1947, Hemus publishing house was nationalized by the totalitarian communist regime under the Private Industrial and Mining Enterprises Nationalization Act. Under this law there were nationalized all of the 169 publishing companies in Bulgaria (64 of them in Sofia). This was done within the framework of the forced nationalization, imposed by the Bulgarian Communist Party's leading government and in the line with the policy pursued by the Bulgarian Communist Party, which led to totalitarian rule till 10 November 1989.

According to Ordinance 3428 of 9 July 1948 on the liquidation of private book publishing issued by the Chairman of the Committee for Science, Art and Culture, promulgated in State Gazette, issue 161 dated 12 July 1948, in force since 12 July 1948, all private publishers had to delete "Publishing" or "Publisher" from their companies’ names and undertake to request the closure of their company affairs.

The premises in which the private publishers have been carrying out their previous activities and their inventory and facilities were placed under the direction of the Science, Arts and Culture Committee, respectively the liquidator.

Gancho Rashkov was appointed as Liquidator. The lawyer Boris Apostolov assisted the Union of Book Publishers.

The book publishing houses, Slavcho Atanasov with its "Biblioteka Zlatni Zurna" (English, "Golden Grains Library"), M. G. Smrikarov with its "Biblioteka Svetovni Avtori" (English, "World Authors Library"), United Household Magazines with its "Famous Novels", as well as the nationalised ones "Hemusu" ["Hemes"], "Danov", "Biser" and ""Kazanlashka Dolina" (English, "Kazanlak Valley"), should transmit their premises in which they have exercised their current activity, together with the whole property – inventory, equipment, available materials, books, etc. to the State Publishing House "Science and Art", respectively to the liquidator, according to the Ordinance, explicitly indicated.

=== 1991–2005 ===
In 1991, Hemus Publishing LLC was established in the Sofia City Court to continue the publishing tradition and the trademark Hemus.

The private company was co-established by B. K. & Milde, Germany – 23.52%; Bulgarian Ministry of Education and Science – 11.76%; Ministry of Culture – 5.88% and the Ministry of Economy – 58.82%.

For 15 years Hemus published around 200 titles.

=== 2016 – to present ===
Hemus is now an imprint of Alegzander Publishing, Sofia.
