= Čudinska planina =

- Location within Serbia

Highest point
- Elevation: 1,496 m (4,908 ft)
- Coordinates: 42°22′07″N 22°27′56″E

Geography
- Location: Serbia / Bulgaria
- Parent range: Rhodope Mountains

Čudinska planina (Serbian Cyrillic: Чудинска планина), or Chudinska planina (Bulgarian: Чудинска планина), is a mountain on the border of Bulgaria and Serbia, near the city of Kyustendil in Bulgaria and the town of Bosilegrad in Serbia. Its highest peak, Aramliya/Aramlija, has an elevation of 1,496 meters above sea level.

== See also ==
- List of mountains in Serbia
