= Bohovska planina =

- Location within Serbia

Highest point
- Elevation: 1,318 m (4,324 ft)
- Coordinates: 42°44′31″N 22°30′01″E

Geography
- Location: Southern Serbia / western Bulgaria
- Parent range: Rhodope Mountains

Bohovska planina (Cyrillic: Боховска планина) is a mountain on the border of Bulgaria and Serbia, near the towns of Bosilegrad in Serbia and Tran in Bulgaria. Its highest peak Ogorelica has an elevation of 1,318 meters above sea level.

== See also ==
- List of mountains in Serbia
- List of mountains in Bulgaria
