= Milevska planina =

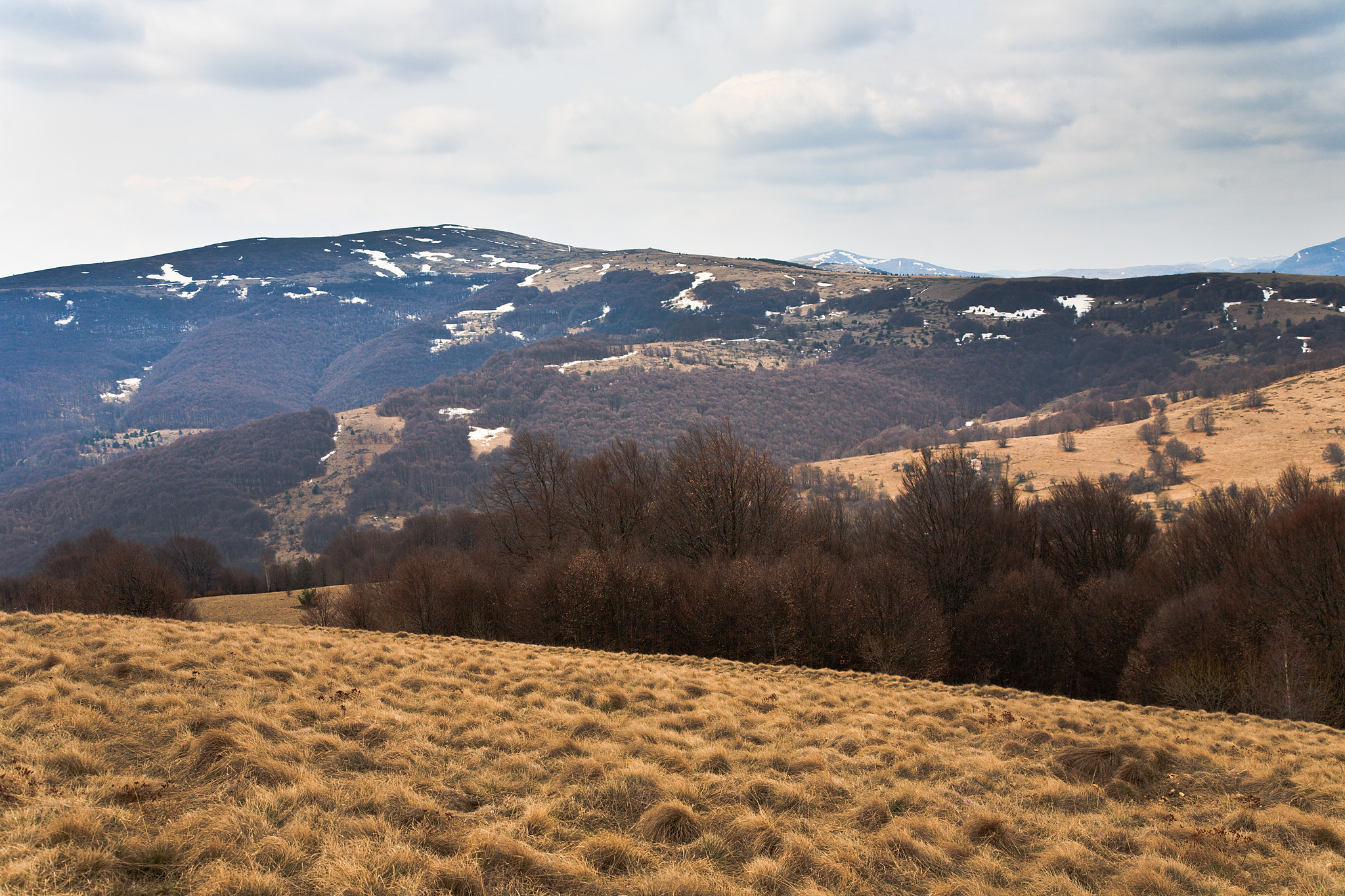

Highest point
- Elevation: 1,738 m (5,702 ft)
- Coordinates: 42°33′54″N 22°26′22″E

Geography
- Location within Bulgaria
- Location: Kyustendil Province, Bulgaria; Pčinja District, Serbia
- Parent range: Rhodope Mountains

Milevska planina (Cyrillic: Милевска планина) is a mountain range in the region of Kraishte in western Bulgaria and southeastern Serbia, near the town of Bosilegrad. Its highest peak, Milevets (Bulgarian: Милевец) or Krvavi kamik (Serbian Cyrillic: Крвави камик) has an elevation of 1,738 meters above sea level. It is located at the border of Bulgaria and Serbia.

== See also ==
- List of mountains in Serbia
