= Ruy (mountain) =

Mountain in Bulgaria and Serbia

- Ruj
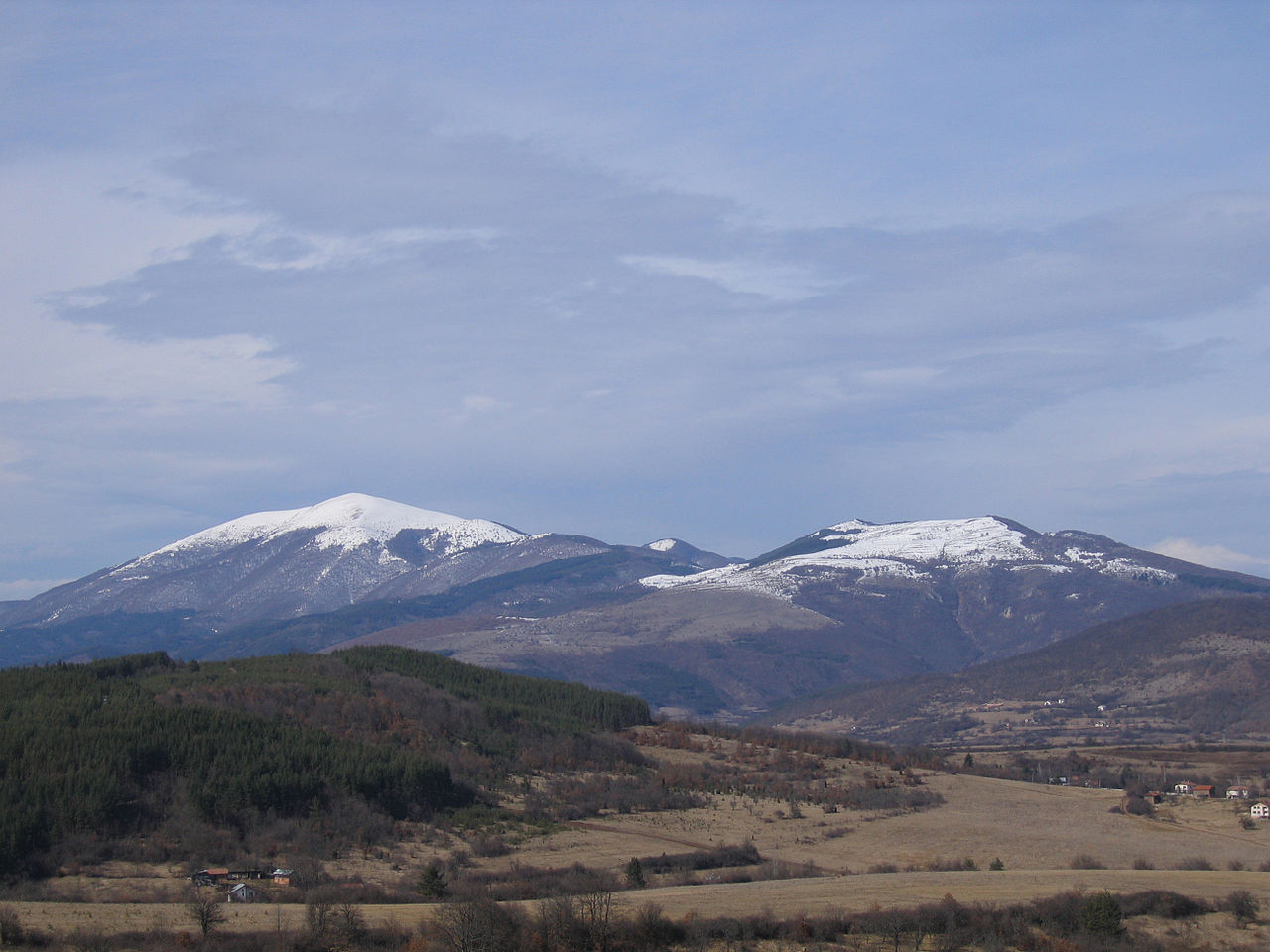

Highest point
- Elevation: 1,706 m (5,597 ft)
- Coordinates: 42°51′46″N 22°34′32″E

Naming
- Native name: Руй (Bulgarian); Руj (Serbian)

Geography
- Location within Bulgaria Location within Serbia
- Location: Bulgaria–Serbia border

Ruy (Bulgarian: Руй) or Ruj (Serbian Cyrillic: Руј), is a mountain range in the Kraishte region on the border of western Bulgaria and southeastern Serbia. Its eponymous highest summit rises 1,706 meters above sea level. The mountain range is located west of Tran and formed the westernmost part of the Ruy-Verila range. On a clear day may be observed the ranges of Rila and Vitosha in Bulgaria and Veliki Strešer in Serbia.

== Geography ==
From northwest to southeast, its length is about 12 km, and its width is up to 10 km. It covers of a territory of 86 km^{2}. To the northeast, east and southeast it reaches the valley of the river Jerma, and to the south its slopes descend steeply to the Tran valley, also known as Znepole. To the north, northwest and west it extends to the valley of the river Blatanica (a left tributary of the Jerma), and to the southwest through a saddle at an altitude of 1243 m, it is connected to Miloslavska planina.

Ruy is a typical massive, block-type mountain bounded by steep, faulted slopes. Its ridge is flat, at about 1600–1700 m above sea level. Its highest point is the eponymous summit of Ruy (1705 m), located in its western part, on the Bulgarian-Serbian border, at border pyramid No. 210.

It is formed of Proterozoic gneiss, schists and amphibolite and of Paleozoic granites and granodiorite. There are small deposits of lead, silver and copper ores. The soils are cinnamon and light brown forest soils. It is covered with a mixed deciduous forest of beech, oak and hornbeam, as well as extensive pastures at the highest altitudes.

In the easternmost part of the mountain range is situated the Tran Gorge, an important natural landmark and one of the 100 Tourist Sites of Bulgaria.

== Gallery ==
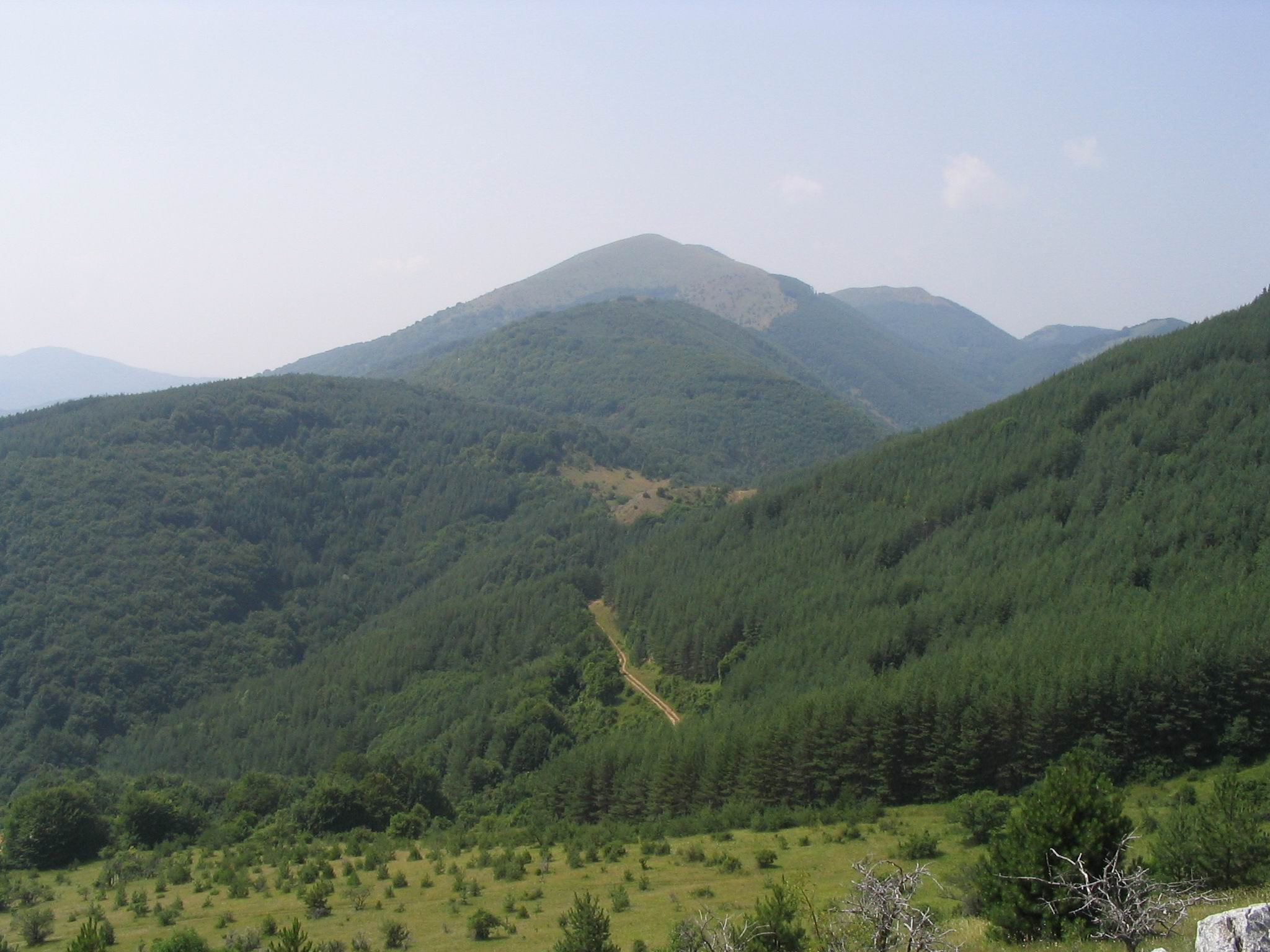
Summit of Ruy, Bulgaria

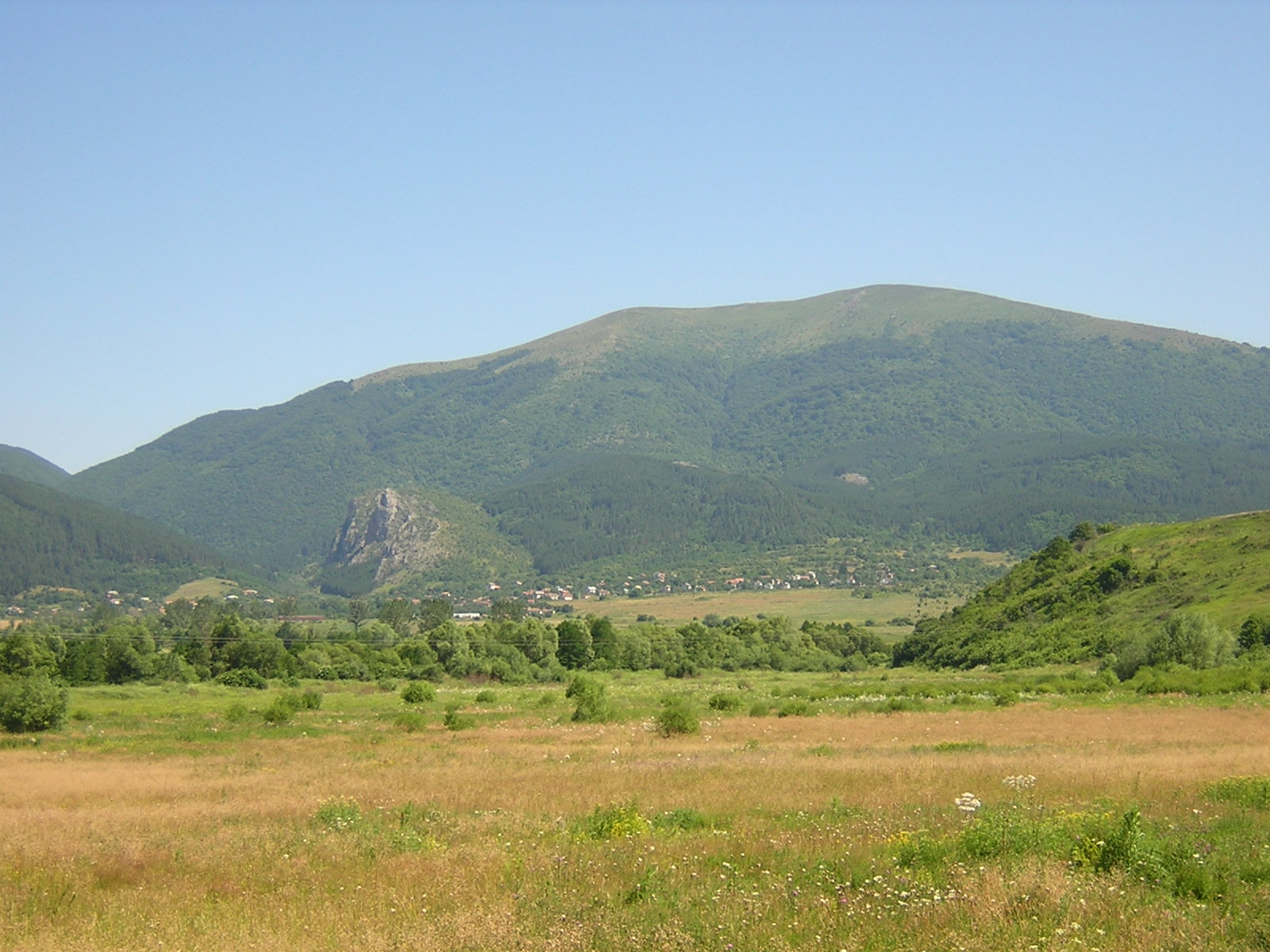
View from Znepole, Bulgaria

Tran Gorge, Bulgaria

== See also ==
- List of mountains in Serbia
