= Tran, Bulgaria =

Tran Трън
- Town
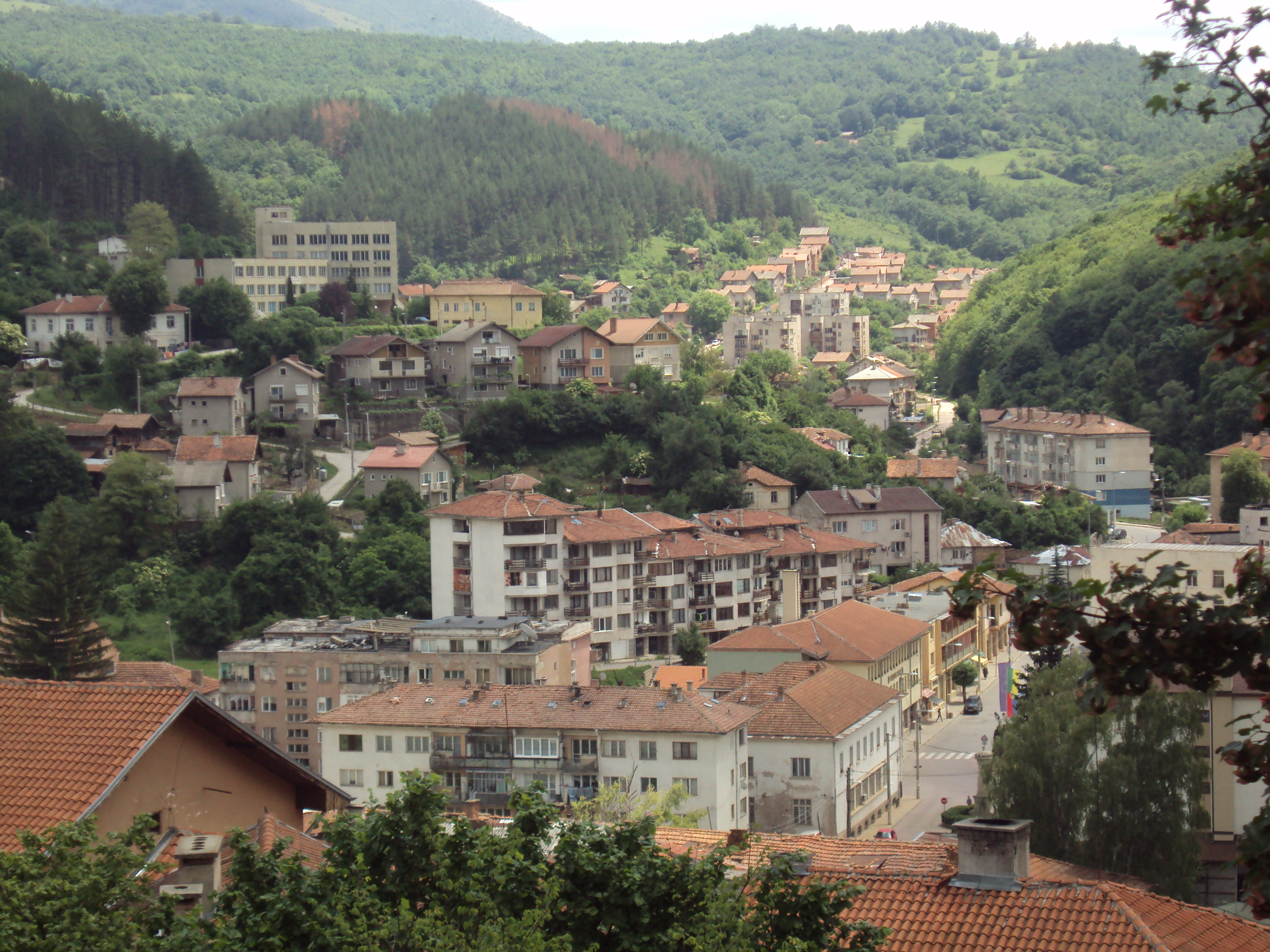

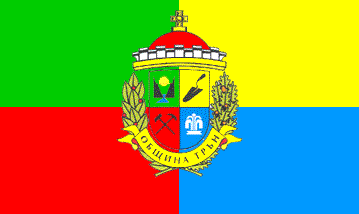
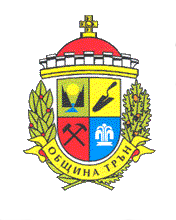
- Flag Coat of arms

- Location of Tran, Bulgaria
- Coordinates: 42°50′N 22°40′E
- Country: Bulgaria
- Provinces (Oblast): Pernik

Government
  - Mayor: Tsvetislava Tsvetkova
- Elevation: 900 m (3,000 ft)

Population (2020)
  - Total: 2,483
- Time zone: UTC+2 (EET)
  - Summer (DST): UTC+3 (EEST)
- Postal Code: 2460
- Area code: 07731

Tran (Bulgarian: Трън, lit. 'thorn', pronounced [trɤn]) is a small town in Tran Municipality, Pernik Province, western Bulgaria. It is 27 km (17 mi) from Breznik and 15 km (9.3 mi) from the border with Serbia.

== Geography ==
=== Location ===
Tran is located in a mountainous region, close to the border with Serbia and to the nearby towns Breznik and Dragoman. It is located on the banks of the river Erma, in the easternmost part of the high mountain valley Znepole. It lies close to the Ruy Mountain and the Tran Gorge.

=== Climate ===
The town has a humid continental climate (Dfb) with large temperature amplitudes, similar to that of Sofia. The lowest temperature in Bulgaria −38.3 °C (−36.9 °F) was recorded in Tran in January 1947. With temperatures frequently dropping to −20 °C (−4 °F) −25 °C (−13 °F) through the winter, Tran can be considered one of the coldest towns in Bulgaria.

== History ==
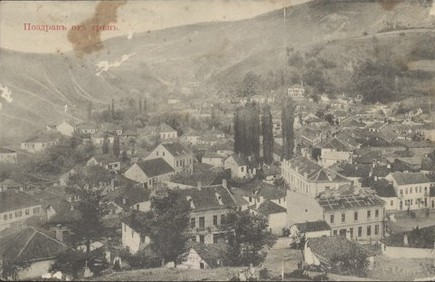
Tran in 1911

The region was successively inhabited by Thracians, Goths and Slavs/Bulgarians. The Goths are from the Heruli tribe and settled for the purpose of mining. The Slavic settlement was quite massive, as evidenced by the almost one hundred percent Slavic name system of the topographic areas in Tran region. Proto-Bulgarian presence is not attested. After the defeat of the Thracian tribes by the Roman Empire, they were subjected to assimilation, and in Tran region the Latin language was used. Traces of Roman-Thracian influence are the name of the local dialect of the town square - Piazza, Chirchilat peak, Rui peak and mountain, Radovo village, etc. Tran region is in the middle of two large Slavic tribes that settled in the Balkans and gave the names of the rivers - Strumi and Moravians. The former are Dacian Slavs or southern Slavs from the Bulgarian group and the latter are a large swarm of Western Slavs, Czech Moravians. In the past, the so-called Znepolski Drum - the old road that connected Dubrovnik and the Adriatic with Serdica. Thus, today's Tran in those days was an important trade centre. Life in Antiquity at the present city is documented only by the discovered ancient tomb and by found Roman coins from the IV century.

For the first time, Tran entered the borders of Bulgaria during the conquest of Sofia by Khan Krum in April 809. During the First Bulgarian Empire, under emperor Samuel (r. 997-1014), as an influential historical figure stands out as the boyar Krakra of Pernik, who was entrusted with the lands in Pernik, Sofia and Tran. The boyar put up fierce resistance to Emperor Basil II for more than 10 years, but nevertheless, in 1018 this area, together with the rest of Bulgaria, came under Byzantine rule.

During the Ottoman rule, the city was known as a market town and was named Iznebol Kabasi, Taran Palanka and Tran Palanka. According to a legend, the name Tran itself comes from even more distant times, when according to the legend there was a large thorn here, under the branches of which there was a healing spring, with the waters from which the local priest Terapontius healed the believers.

At the end of the 18th century, during the devastation of Ali Pasha of Ioannina, groups from Kostur moved to Tran. An Ayan of Breznik, Kara Feizi, in the area of Tran, one of the most successful Kardzhali leaders persecuted the local population. After his death, his son Ali Bey took over the administration of the district, from whose arbitrariness he screamed the local population to such an extent that he sent complaints to the central government several times and eventually Ali Bey was removed, handed over to the authorities and killed on the way to Constantinople.

After the end of the Russo-Turkish War of 1828-1829, the so-called Znepole Uprising broke out in the area of Tran in 1830. For a short time, Tran was free, but immediately after that the Ottoman authorities brutally dealt with the rebels. In 1871 the Tran Revolutionary Committee was founded in the monastery "Archangel Michael". The committee is headed by Dimo Petrichev and Gigo Masalovichki. The committee took an active part in the Serbo-Turkish War of 1876. The detachments of Simo Sokolov and Grozdan Nasalevski took part in it. These two detachments later joined the Russo-Turkish Liberation War of 1877-1878. They were joined by the detachment formed by Tako Peev. Thus Tran became the centre of the so-called Shop uprising, in the course of which the Tran, Breznik, Radomir and Kjustendil regions were liberated. At the end of the Liberation War, Tran came under the temporary rule of Serbia until 1879. The Neuilly-sur-Seine Treaty had severe consequences for Tran, with which a large number of settlements were separated from the district and given to Serbia, and others such as Vrabcha, Strezimirovtsi, Bankya (village) and Petachintsi, are literally halved, and even today you can see the houses through which the border passes, dividing them into two - divided yards, cemeteries, as well as many families.

== Culture ==
One distinctive feature of the town is the specific Tran dialect of the Bulgarian language spoken in Tran, which is part of the Transitional dialect group.

=== Churches ===
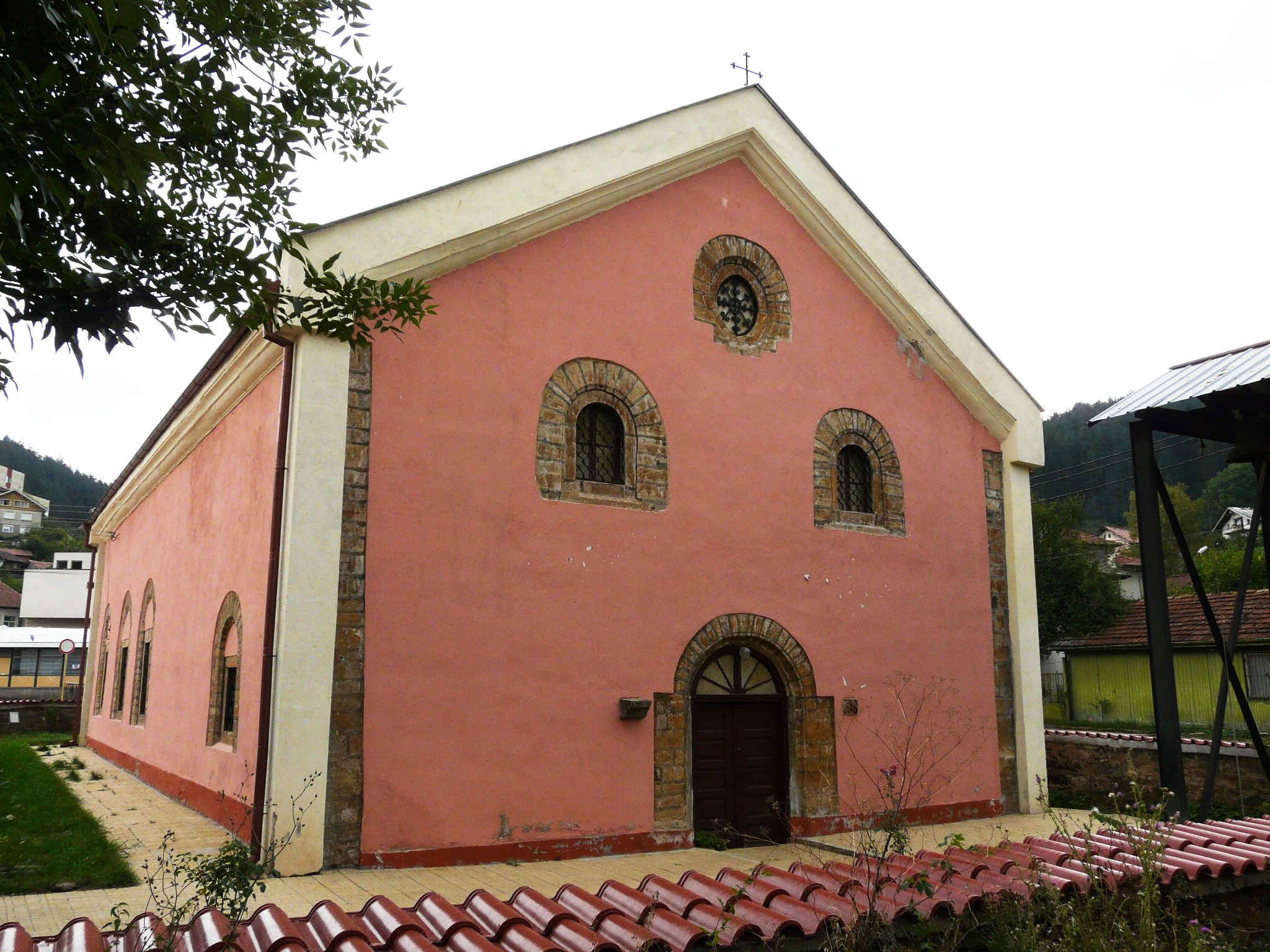
Saint Nicholas church

- Saint Nikola – in the centre of town
- Saint Petka – in Barintsi neighbourhood
- Saint Petka – chapel on top of Barintsi neighbourhood
- Saint Troitsa – chapel in Murgovitsa neighbourhood
- Pentecostal church

== Notable people ==
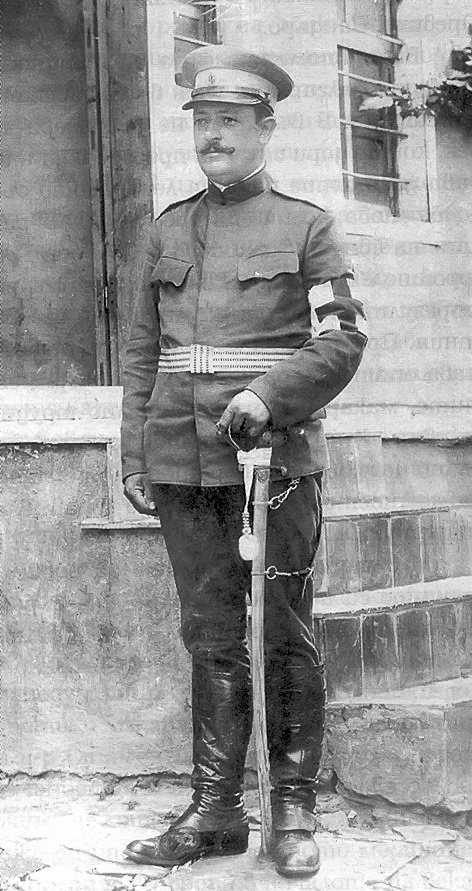
Stamen Grigorov

- Zhana Gŭlŭbova (1908–2009), scientist, essayist and publicist
- Stamen Grigorov (1878–1945), physician, microbiologist and founder of Lactobacillus bulgaricus

== Honour ==
Tran Crag on Livingston Island in the South Shetland Islands, Antarctica is named after Tran.

== See also ==
- Torlakian dialect
