= Jerma (river) =

River in Bulgaria and Serbia

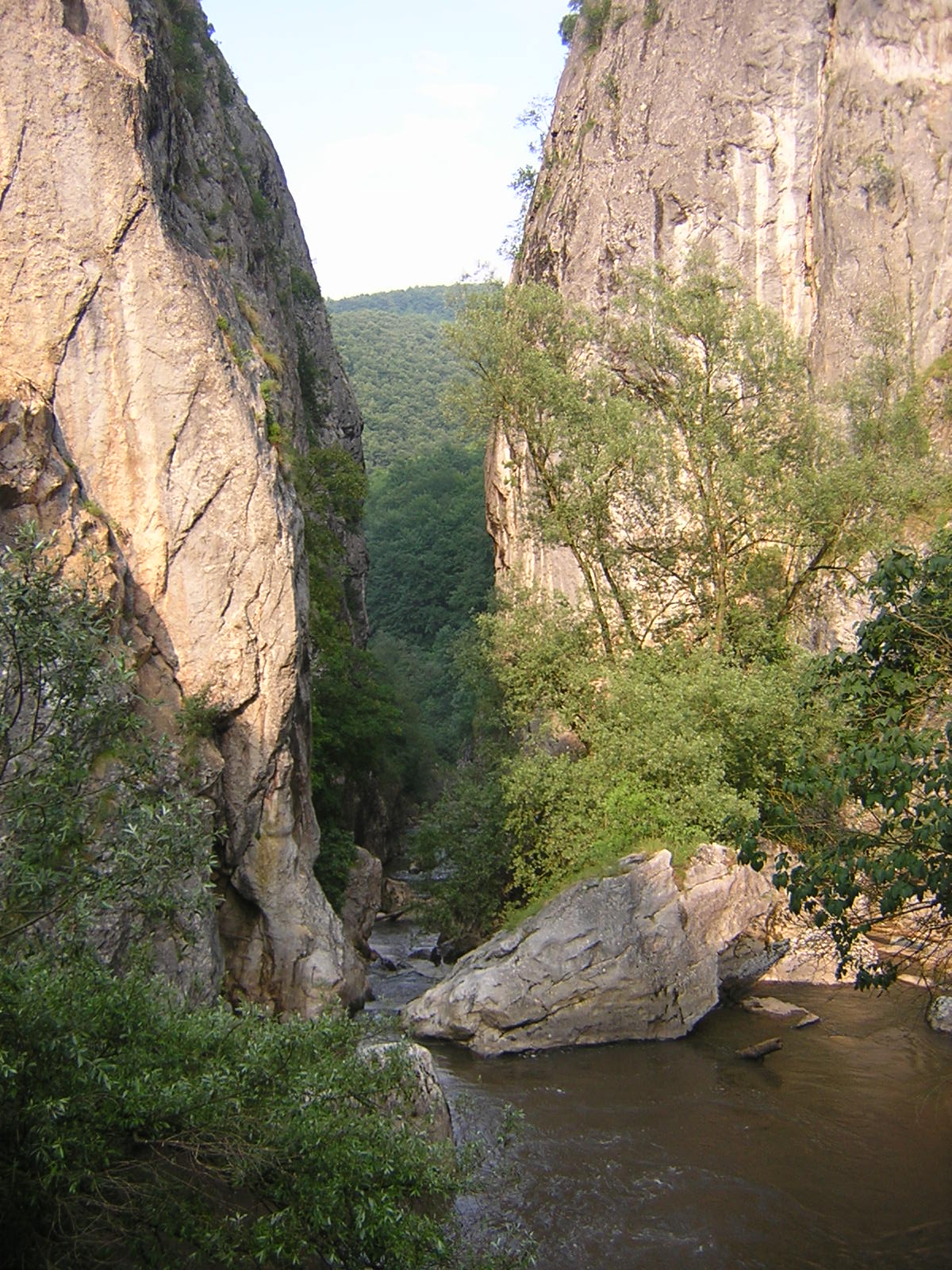
- The Erma Gorge, Bulgaria
- Native name: Јерма (Serbian); Ерма (Bulgarian)

Location
- Country: Serbia, Bulgaria

Physical characteristics
- Source
  - location: near Lake Vlasina, Serbia
- Mouth
  - location: Nišava near Pirot, Serbia
  - coordinates: 43°4′0″N 22°41′7″E
- Length: 72 km (45 mi)

Basin features
- Progression: Nišava→ South Morava→ Great Morava→ Danube→ Black Sea

The Jerma (Serbian Cyrillic: Јерма) or Erma (Bulgarian: Ерма) is a river in southeastern Serbia and western Bulgaria. It is notable for passing the Bulgarian-Serbian border twice.

== Characteristics ==
During the January 2021 floods, the Jerma flooded the road in its valley and overflooded the riverbed of the Nišava. This caused the spilling of the Nišava, which flooded parts of Bela Palanka.

== Sources ==
- Mala Prosvetina Enciklopedija, Third edition (1985); Prosveta; ISBN 86-07-00001-2
- Jovan Đ. Marković (1990): Enciklopedijski geografski leksikon Jugoslavije; Svjetlost-Sarajevo; ISBN 86-01-02651-6
