= Immovable Cultural Heritage in the Pčinja District =

This list includes Immovable Cultural Heritage sites in the Pčinja District of Serbia.

== Cultural monuments ==
| Number in the Central Register | Photo | Monument | Municipality | Address | Designated since | Classification |
|---|---|---|---|---|---|---|
| SK 224 | | Prohor Pčinjski Monastery | Bujanovac | Klenike; 42.329664°N 21.896158°E | 23 September 1950 | Exceptional Importance |
| SK 227 | | Church of the Holy Mother of God – Vražji kamen | Trgovište | Donja Trnica; 42.384359°N 22.0498643°E | 14 May 1958 | Great Importance |
| SK 235 | | Kacapun Monastery | Vladičin Han | Kacapun; 42.687041°N 21.98054°E | 14 June 1968 | |
| SK 285 | | Turkish Hammam | Vranje | Vranje Kralja Milana 24; 42.5600133°N 21.898646°E | 29 June 1948 | Great Importance |
| SK 291 | | Paša's Houses (Pašini konaci) | Vranje | Vranje; Trg Staniše Stošića; 42.554687°N 21.898453°E | 2 February 1949 | Great Importance |
| SK 292 | | House of the People's Hero Sima Pogačarević | Vranje | Vranje; Beogradska 49; 42.551223°N 21.8961°E | 10 June 1949 | |
| SK 293 | | Borislav Stanković's House | Vranje | Vranje; Baba Zlatina 9; 42.549425°N 21.901346°E | 2 March 1950 | Great Importance |
| SK 296 | | Dragutin Vlajinac's House | Vranje | Vranje; Generala Belimarkovića 4; 42.550484°N 21.898433°E | 7 September 1965 | Great Importance |
| SK 324 | | Old Bridge in Vranje | Vranje | Vranje Devet Jugovića st. 42.562113°N 21.897964°E | 29 June 1948 | |
| SK 325 | | Old Fountain "Đerenka" | Vranje | Vranje Sinđelićeva 13; 42.561537°N 21.900615°E | 2 February 1949 | |
| SK 659 | | Markovo Kale | Vranje | Vranje; 42.581668°N 21.88838°E | 29 June 1948 | Great Importance |
| SK 773 | | Church of the Holy Virgin | Vladičin Han | Mrtvica; 42.771298°N 22.082368°E | 30 May 1986 | Great Importance |
| SK 862 | | Church of The Holy Virgin | Vranje | Sobina; 42.5576088°N 21.8809408°E | 30 June 1986 | |
| SK 863 | | Municipal Authorities Building (Vranje Municipal Assembly) | Vranje | Vranje; Trg Republike 1; 42.556218°N 21.897757°E | 30 June 1986 | Great Importance |
| SK 864 | | Pribojčić's Old Town House | Vranje | Vranje; Baba Zlatina 6 (6 Vladimira Nazora St.); 42.5491087°N 21.8982357°E | 30 June 1986 | |
| SK 865 | | Stanisavljević's Old Town House | Vranje | Vranje; Bore Stankovića 6; 42.5522143°N 21.8987355°E | 30 June 1986 | |
| SK 866 | | Stana Janjić's Old Town House | Vranje | Vranje; Dr Kopše 17; 42.558806°N 21.895284°E | 30 June 1986 | |
| SK 871 | | Monopol Building | Vranje | Vranje; Stefana Prvovenčanog; 42.5467889°N 21.9011995°E | 27 May 1987 | |
| SK 872 | | Monument to the Liberators of Vranje from the Ottomans | Vranje | Vranje Trg Republike; 42.555641°N 21.8955857°E | 27 May 1987 | |
| SK 947 | | Holy Transfiguration Church | Vladičin Han | Stubal; 42.651483°N 22.036594°E | 7 September 1990 | |
| SK 949 | | St. Parascheva of the Balkans Church | Vladičin Han | Lepenica; 42.661367°N 22.039475°E | 7 September 1990 | |
| SK 1924 | | Orthodox Cathedral of the Holy Trinity | Vranje | Vranje corner of the streets Ivana Milutinovića and Dositeja Obradovića; 42.5520534°N 21.8990093°E | 22 May 2001 | |
| SK 1927 | | Old Hotel Vranje in Vranje | Vranje | Vranje; Trg Republike 4-10; 42.5558512°N 21.8974412°E | 8 August 1997 | |
| SK 1933 | | Municipal Court Building | Vranje | Vranje corner of the streets Matije Gupca, Narodnog Heroja and Kralja Milana; 42.556278°N 21.8954193°E | 8 August 1997 | |
| SK 1936 | | Gymnasium Building | Vranje | Vranje; Partizanska 12; 42.5534761°N 21.8933669°E | 8 August 1997 | |
| SK 2057 | | St. Pantaleimon's Monastery in Lepčinac | Vranje | Lepčince; 42.4208555°N 21.9639015°E | 1 December 2005 | |
| SK 2068 | | House of Mitke Stajić - prototype of Mitke from Bora Stanković's "Koštana" | Vranje | Vranje corner of the streets Karađorđeva (Maršala Tita) and 29. novembra 42.5533402°N 21.8986135°E | 11 July 1970 | |
| SK 2152 | | Ibrahim Paša Mosque Complex | Preševo | Preševo; Ramiza Sadikua 38; 42.3271319°N 21.6617623°E | 22 November 2013 | |
| SK 2153 | | Residential House and Buildings with Shops of Nađiba and Halil Esad | Preševo | Preševo Maršala Tita 28; 42.310106°N 21.647093°E | 22 November 2013 | |

== Archaeological Sites ==
| Number in the Central Register | Photo | Monument | Municipality | Address | Designated since | Classification |
|---|---|---|---|---|---|---|
| AN 151 | | Kale Archaeological Site in Krševica | Bujanovac | Krševica; 42°26′36″N 21°51′37″E | 5 March 2009 | |

== Spatial Cultural-Historical Units ==
| Number in the Central Register | Photo | Name | Municipality | Address | Designated since | Classification |
|---|---|---|---|---|---|---|
| PKIC 33 | | Baba Zlatina Street Complex | Vranje | Vranje; Baba Zlatina st. 42.549122°N 21.900078°E | 30 June 1986 | Great Importance |
