= Lepenica =

Lepenica may refer to:

== Bosnia and Herzegovina ==
- Lepenica (Fojnička River), a river
- Lepenica (Rogatica), a village
- Lepenica, Tešanj, a village

== Croatia ==
- Lepenica, Croatia, a village near Šibenik

== Serbia ==
- Lepenica (Great Morava), a river
- Lepenica (region), a region
- Lepenica (Vladičin Han), a village
- Lepenica, Mačva, a village
- Lepenica (Kolubara), a river, right tributary to Kolubara
