= Zavalska Planina =

Mountain in Bulgaria

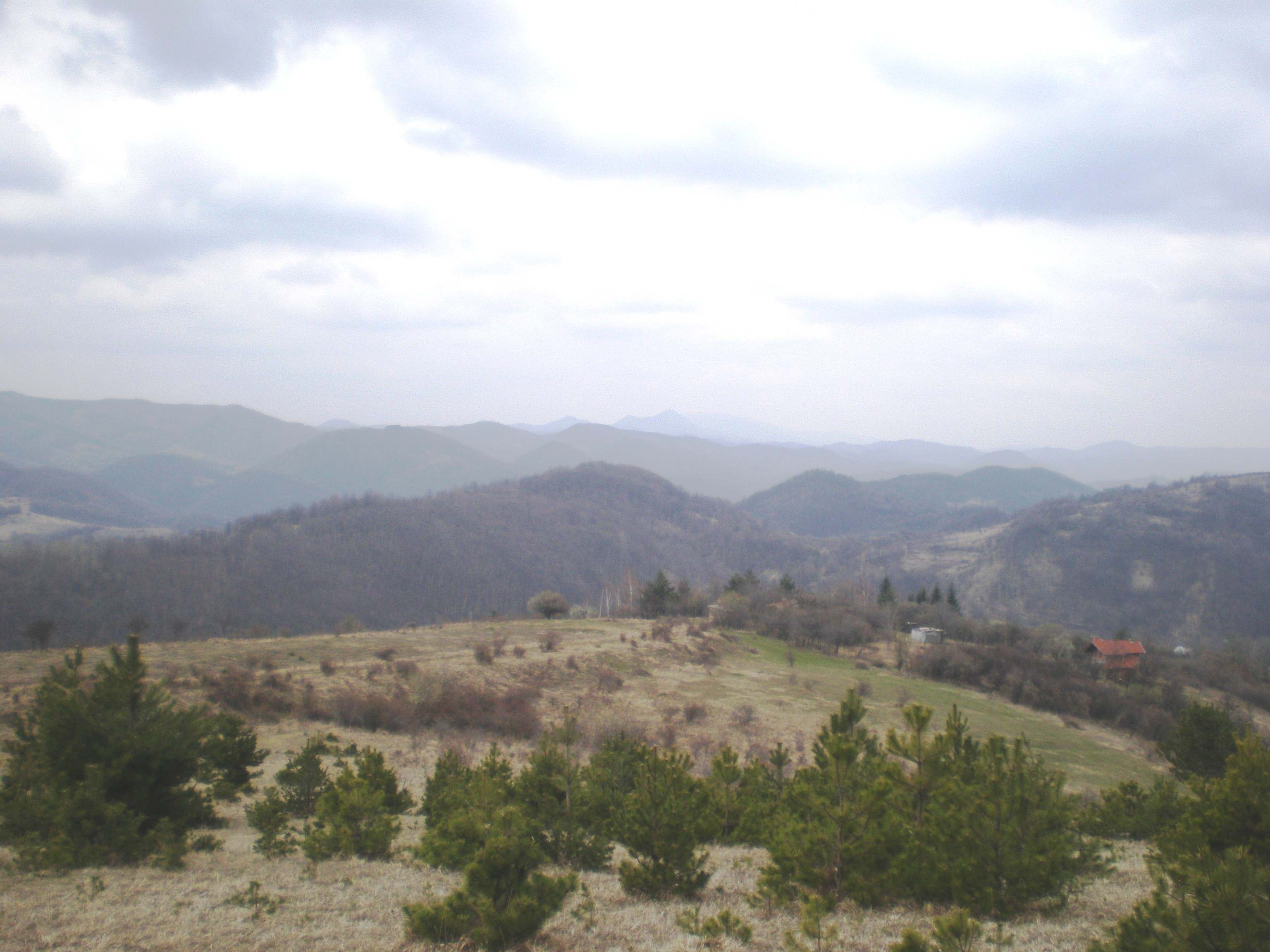

Highest point
- Elevation: 1,181 m (3,875 ft)
- Coordinates: 42°49′48″N 22°46′58.8″E

Naming
- Native name: Завалска планина (Bulgarian)

Geography
- Location within Bulgaria
- Location: Bulgaria

Zavalska Planina (Bulgarian: Завалска планина) is a mountain range in Pernik Province, western Bulgaria, forming the westernmost part of the Zavalska–Plana chain of the Srednogorie mountain range system.

The mountain range spans in direction northwest–southeast for about 20 km; the width is 4 to 5 km. To the northeast the Yaroslavska Valley (964 m) connects it to the Viskyar mountain range and to the southeast a valley separates it from the Greben ridge of Viskyar. To the southwest the valley of the river Yablanitsa, a right tributary of the Erma, forms the boundary with the small mountain ranges Ezdimirska Planina and Strazha of the Kraishte region, while a 878 m saddle links it to Lyubash. To the northwest a 971 m saddle connects it to the mountain range of Greben.

Zavalska Planina consists of several parallel ridges in direction northwest–southeast separated by longitudinal valleys. It main ridge rises to 1,000–1,100 m. It highest summit is Kitka (1,181 m), situated 1.4 km northwest of the village of Zavala. It is made up mainly of Upper Cretaceous sandstones, marl, limestone, tuff, tuffite and thick andesite beds. Along part of its ridge passes the main watershed of Bulgaria between the Black Sea and the Aegean Sea basins. Zavalska Planina is the source of the Konska reka, a right tributary of the Struma of the Aegean basin, and several small right tributaries of the Yablanitsa of the Black Sea basin. The soil cover consists of cinnamon and light brown forest soils. The mountain range is mostly deforested, with some oak and hornbeam forests.

There are one town and 12 villages in the mountain range and its slopes — the town of Breznik and the villages of Bilintsi, Butrointsi, Vidritsa, Vrabcha, Garlo, Zavala, Mraketintsi, Murtintsi, Nedelkovo, Prodancha, Filipovtsi and Yaroslavtsi.

The mountain range is served by two roads of the national network. Along its southwestern slopes between Breznik and Filipovtsi passes a 23.8 km stretch of the second class II-63 road Pernik–Breznik–Tran–the border with Serbia. Along its northwestern slopes between Filipovtsi and Gralska Padina is a 13.7 km section of the third class III-813 road Buchin Prohod–Godech–Dragoman–Tran.
