= II-63 road (Bulgaria) =

Road in Bulgaria

Republic Road I-63
- Републикански път I-63

Route information
- Length: 68.7 km (42.7 mi)

Major junctions
- From: Km 81.4 of I-6, Pernik
- To: Strezimirovtsi at the Bulgaria–Serbia border; Road 40 in Serbia

Location
- Country: Bulgaria
- Towns: Pernik, Breznik, Tran

Highway system
- Highways in Bulgaria

Republican Road II-63 (Bulgarian: Републикански път II-63) is a second-class road in the extreme north-west of Bulgaria, running entirely in Pernik Province. Its length is 68.7 km.

== Route description ==
The road starts at Km 81.6 of the first class I-6 road in the western part of the city of Pernik and heads north through the Pernik Valley. After the village of Meshtitsa it cuts through a low watershed and enters the Braznik Valley, reaching the homonymous town. There, the road turns west and exits the valley at the village of Konska, turns northwest and cuts through the main watershed of Bulgaria, dividing the Black Sea and the Aegean Sea drainages, reaching the valley of the river Yablanitsa, a right tributary of the Erma of the Black Sea drainage. The II-63 follows the Yablanitsa valley between the small mountain ranges of Zavalska Planina to the northeast and Strazha to the southwest, passing through the villages of Mraketintsi and Filipovtsi. One kilometer after the latter it exits the valley of the Yablanirsa, turns west, passes through a small watershed and descends to the eastern part of the Tran Valley, also known as Znepole, reaching the small town of Tran. From there the road continues westwards along the northern left banks of the river Erma, passes through the villages of Glavanovtsi and Slishovtsi and reaches the Bulgaria–Serbia border at the checkpoint it the divided village of Strezimirovtsi, where it continues as Road 40 of the Serbian road network.
