= Priboj (disambiguation) =

Priboj is a municipality and town in Serbia.

Priboj may also refer to:

- Priboj, Leskovac
- Priboj, Vladičin Han

== People with the surname ==
- István Priboj (died 1957), Hungarian and Slovak footballer and manager

== See also ==
- Pribojevići, village in Bosnia and Herzegovina
- Priboj City Stadium
