= Jastrebac (disambiguation) =

Jastrebac is a mountain in central Serbia. It can also refer to other entities in Serbia:

== Geography ==
- Jastrebac (Bujanovac), a village near Bujanovac
- Jastrebac (Vladičin Han), a village near Vladičin Han
- Jastrebac (Vlasotince), a village near Vlasotince
- Jastrebac (Zenica), a village in Zenica, Bosnia and Herzegovina

== Sport ==
- FK Jastrebac Niš, football club
