= State Road 40 (Serbia) =

Road in Serbia

State Road 40
- Serbian: Državni put IB reda 40; Serbian Cyrillic: Државни пут IБ реда 40

Route information
- Maintained by JP "Putevi Srbije"
- Length: 53.152 km (33.027 mi)

Major junctions
- From: Vladičin Han
- To: Serbia-Bulgaria border at Strezimirovci, National Road 63

Location
- Country: Serbia
- Districts: Pčinja

Highway system
- Roads in Serbia; Motorways
← 39	→ 41

State Road 40 is an IB-class road in southern Serbia, connecting Vladičin Han with Bulgaria at Strezimirovci. It is located in Southern and Eastern Serbia.

Before the new road categorization regulation given in 2013, the route wore the following names: P 124 and M 1.13 (before 2012) / 136 (after 2012).

The existing route is a main road with two traffic lanes. By the valid Space Plan of Republic of Serbia the road is not planned for upgrading to motorway, and is expected to be conditioned in its current state.

== Sections ==
Section number	Length	Distance	Section name
04001	0.456 km (0.283 mi)	0.456 km (0.283 mi)	Vladičin Han - Vladičin Han (Gramađe)
04002	1.054 km (0.655 mi)	1.510 km (0.938 mi)	Vladičin Han (Gramađe) - Vladičin Han
04003	3.060 km (1.901 mi)	4.570 km (2.840 mi)	Vladičin Han - Žitorađe
04004	5.357 km (3.329 mi)	9.927 km (6.168 mi)	Žitorađe - Surdulica
04005	19.271 km (11.974 mi)	29.198 km (18.143 mi)	Surdulica - Vlasina Okruglica
04006	4.337 km (2.695 mi)	33.535 km (20.838 mi)	Vlasina Okruglica - Vlasina Lake
04007	19.009 km (11.812 mi)	52.544 km (32.649 mi)	Vlasina Lake - Strezimirovci
04008	0.608 km (0.378 mi)	53.152 km (33.027 mi)	Strezimirovci - Serbia-Bulgaria border (Strezimirovci)

== See also ==
- Roads in Serbia
