= Lepenica, Serbia =

Lepenica, Serbia may refer to several places:

- Lepenica (Great Morava), a river in Šumadija district
- Lepenica (region)
- Lepenica (Vladičin Han), a village in the municipality of Vladičin Han, Pčinja District
- Lepenica, Pčinja, a village in Pčinja District
- Lepenica, Mačva, a village in Mačva District
