= Zoran Stanković =

Serbian politician (1954–2021)

- Зоран Станковић
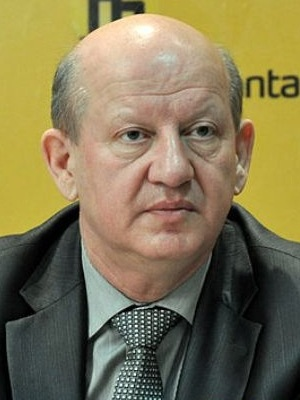
- Stanković in 2011

Minister of Health
- In office 14 March 2011 – 27 July 2012
- Prime Minister: Mirko Cvetković
- Preceded by: Tomica Milosavljević
- Succeeded by: Slavica Đukić Dejanović

Minister of Defence
- In office 21 October 2005 – 15 May 2007
- Prime Minister: Vojislav Koštunica
- Preceded by: Prvoslav Davinić
- Succeeded by: Dragan Šutanovac

Personal details
- Born: 9 November 1954 Tegovište, FRP Yugoslavia
- Died: 5 October 2021 (aged 66) Belgrade, Serbia
- Party: Independent
- Education: University of Niš
- Occupation: Doctor

Military service
- Allegiance: SFR Yugoslavia; FR Yugoslavia / Serbia and Montenegro
- Branch/service: Yugoslav People's Army; Armed Forces of Yugoslavia / Armed Forces of Serbia and Montenegro
- Years of service: 1980–2005
- Rank: Major General

Zoran Stanković (Serbian Cyrillic: Зоран Станковић, pronounced [zǒran stǎːŋkoʋitɕ]; 9 November 1954 – 5 October 2021) was a Serbian major general and politician. He served as the Minister of Defence in the Government of Serbia and the Council of Ministers of Serbia and Montenegro and Minister of Health in the Government of Serbia. His affiliation was independent.

== Early life and career ==
Zoran Stanković was born in the village of Tegovište, Vladičin Han, Yugoslavia. He graduated from the Medicine Faculty at the University of Niš. He finished his Postgraduate Medicine studies at Military Medical Academy in 1997.

Stanković had been a member of the Yugoslav Committee for the Collection of Data on Investigations of Crimes against Humanity and International Law since 1993. In December 1997, he formed a team to investigate the consequences of the NATO bombing of Republika Srpska on suspicion of using depleted uranium missiles. He was a member of the Truth and Reconciliation Commission. He is one of the most respected forensic scientists and pathologists in Serbia, and since 1995 he has worked as a United Nations expert. He testified before the International Criminal Tribunal for the former Yugoslavia in several cases.

He worked as a coroner doctor and became the head manager of Military Medical Academy in 2002. He held this position until 2005 when he was elected to replace Prvoslav Davinić as the new Defense Minister.

Stankovic died from COVID-19 in Belgrade on 5 October 2021, during the COVID-19 pandemic in Serbia. He was 66 years old.

== Politics ==
In 2005, he was elected a Minister of Defence, and held this position until 2007, when he was replaced by Dragan Šutanovac. He also served as the Minister of Health from 2011 to 2012.

He ran for president at the 2012 Serbian presidential election as the candidate of the United Regions of Serbia, and he finished fifth in the first round with 6.58% of the votes.

In early November 2012, the Government of Serbia appointed him head of the Coordination Body for Bujanovac, Preševo and Medveđa.

== Selected works ==
- Stanković, Z., Kovačević, V., Karan, Ž., Milosavljević, I., Tatić, V. (1991) "MORFOLOŠKE KARAKTERISTIKE BLAST POVREDA POGINULIH U OKLOPNIM VOZILIMA“, Vojnosanitetski pregled, Beograd, 48:6, 531–534.
- Stanković, Z., Kovačević, V., Domijan, E., Milosavljević, I., Nikolić, M., Nikolić, K., Karan, Ž. (1992) "THE IDENTIFICATION OF CARBONIZED, PUTREFIED, SLAUGHTERED, DECOMPOSED AND FROZEN BODIES“, INTERNATIONAL CONFERENCE AND EXHIBITION ON CRIMINAL INVESTIGATION AND JURISDICTION, Budapest, 10–13.
- Stanković, Z. (1992) "SUDSKO - MEDICINSKA OBDUKCIJA U DOKAZIVANJU ZLOČINA“, SANU, Naučni skupovi; knj. 69, Odeljenje istorijskih nauka, knj. 22, Beograd, 363 - 372.
- Stanković, Z. (1992) "SUDSKO-MEDICINSKA EKSPERTIZA DVADESET ČETVORO UBIJENIH GRAĐANA IZ GOSPIĆA I OKOLINE“, Vojnosanitetski pregled, Beograd, 49:2,143-169.
- Stanković, Z., Kovačević, V., Nikolić, M., Milosavljević, I., Domijan, E., Karan, Ž. (1992) "RAD SUDSKO-MEDICINSKE EKIPE U VUKOVARU“, Dies medicinae forensis, Niš, 6–7 November.
- Stanković, Z., Janković, M. (2001), "MRTVI VEČNA OPOMENA ŽIVIMA“, Edicija zbivanja i svedočenja, Bibloteka Matice srpske, Beograd - Pale, 434 str.
- Janković, M., Stanković, Z., Jeftić, M., Mikić, Đ.(1995), "ZLOČIN ČEKA KAZNU“, Edicija zbivanja i svedočenja, Biblioteka Matice srpske, Novi Sad, 301 str.
- Dimitrijević, J., Stanković, Z., Popović, Z., Kovačević, Z., Škatarić, V., Milosavljević, I., Gligić, A. (2004) "SIGNIFICANCE OF PATHOLOGIC FINDINGS OF HEMORRHAGIC FEVER IN AUTOPSY MATERIAL“, Poster presentation II Intercontinental Congress of pathology, Iguassu Falls, Brazil, 1326, A 06.110, 72.
- Stanković, Z. (2000) "EKSPERTIZA MOŠTIJU S PREVLAKE“, Publikacija "Prevlaka Svetog Arhangela Mihaila - Humak Srpske duhovnosti“, Beograd, 99–107.
- Kovačević, V., Knežević-Ušaj, S., Milosavljević, I., Stanković, Z., Brđović, J. (1994) "A propos one suicidal dimethoate poisoning“, Arch Toxicol Kinet Xenobiot Metab, Vol 2, No 2, 193.

== See also ==
- Military of Serbia

Government offices
Preceded by Momčilo Krgović	Head of the Military Medical Academy; January 2002 – April 2005	Succeeded by Miodrag Jevtić
Political offices
Preceded by Prvoslav Davinić	Minister of Defence of Serbia and Montenegro; Minister of Defence of Serbia (since 2006); 2005 – 2007	Succeeded by Dragan Šutanovac
Preceded by Tomica Milosavljević	Minister of Health of Serbia; 2011 – 2012	Succeeded by Slavica Đukić Dejanović
