= State Road 42 (Serbia) =

Road in Serbia

State Road 42
- Serbian: Državni put IB reda 42; Serbian Cyrillic: Државни пут IБ реда 42

Route information
- Maintained by JP "Putevi Srbije"
- Length: 80.323 km (49.910 mi) 20.208 km (12.557 mi) (excluding Kosovo)

Major junctions
- From: Čukarka E75
- To: Čaglavica, Roads M-2 and M-25 E65

Location
- Country: Serbia
- Districts: Pčinja, Kosovo Pomoravlje, Kosovo (Constitution of Serbia) / Gjilan, Pristina (UNMIK)

Highway system
- Roads in Serbia; Motorways
← 41	→ 45

State Road 42 is an IB-class road in southern Serbia, connecting Čukarka with Čaglavica. It is located in Southern and Eastern Serbia and Kosovo and Metohija regions. The section between Depče and Čaglavica is controlled by Kosovo government and UNMIK.

Before the new road categorization regulation given in 2013, the route wore the following names: P 237 and M 25.2 (before 2012) / 35 (after 2012).

The existing route is a main road with two traffic lanes. By the valid Space Plan of Republic of Serbia the road is not planned for upgrading to motorway, and is expected to be conditioned in its current state.

== Sections ==
Section number	Length	Distance	Section name
04201	0.654 km (0.406 mi)	0.654 km (0.406 mi)	Čukarka - Preševo interchange
04202	19.554 km (12.150 mi)	20.208 km (12.557 mi)	Preševo interchange - Kosovo and Metohija border (Depče)
Sections under Kosovo government - UNMIK control
04203	16.332 km (10.148 mi)	36.540 km (22.705 mi)	Kosovo and Metohija border (Depče) - Gnjilane (Dobrčane)
04108	0.089 km (0.055 mi)	36.629 km (22.760 mi)	Gnjilane (Dobrčane) - Gnjilane (Klokot) (overlap with)
04204	8.266 km (5.136 mi)	44.895 km (27.896 mi)	Gnjilane (Klokot) - Brasaljce
04205	11.220 km (6.972 mi)	56.115 km (34.868 mi)	Brasaljce - Labljane
04206	24.208 km (15.042 mi)	80.323 km (49.910 mi)	Labljane - Čaglavica

== See also ==
- Roads in Serbia
- Roads in Kosovo
