= Urvič =

Urvič may refer to:

- Urvič, Bogovinje, North Macedonia
- Urvič (Vladičin Han), Serbia
