= Mrtvica =

Mrtvica may refer to:

- Mrtvica (Vladičin Han), a village in the municipality of Vladičin Han, Serbia
- Mrtvica (Lopare), a village in the municipality of Lopare, Bosnia and Herzegovina
- Mrtvica (river), a river in Bosnia and Herzegovina along the Maganik mountains
