= Lepena =

Lepena may refer to:

- Lepena, Slovenia, a village near Bovec
- Lepena, Serbia, a village near Knjaževac
- Lepena, a river near Lepenski Vir, Serbia
- Lepena, Slovenian name for the village of Leppen, near Eisenkappel-Vellach in Austria
- Lepêna, Kurdish name for the village of Saklı, Hasankeyf, Turkey

== See also ==
- Lepenica
