= Gramade =

Gramade may refer to:

- Gramađe, Serbia
- Gramade, Smolyan Province in Rudozem, a town in southern Bulgaria
