= Donje Jabukovo =

- Village
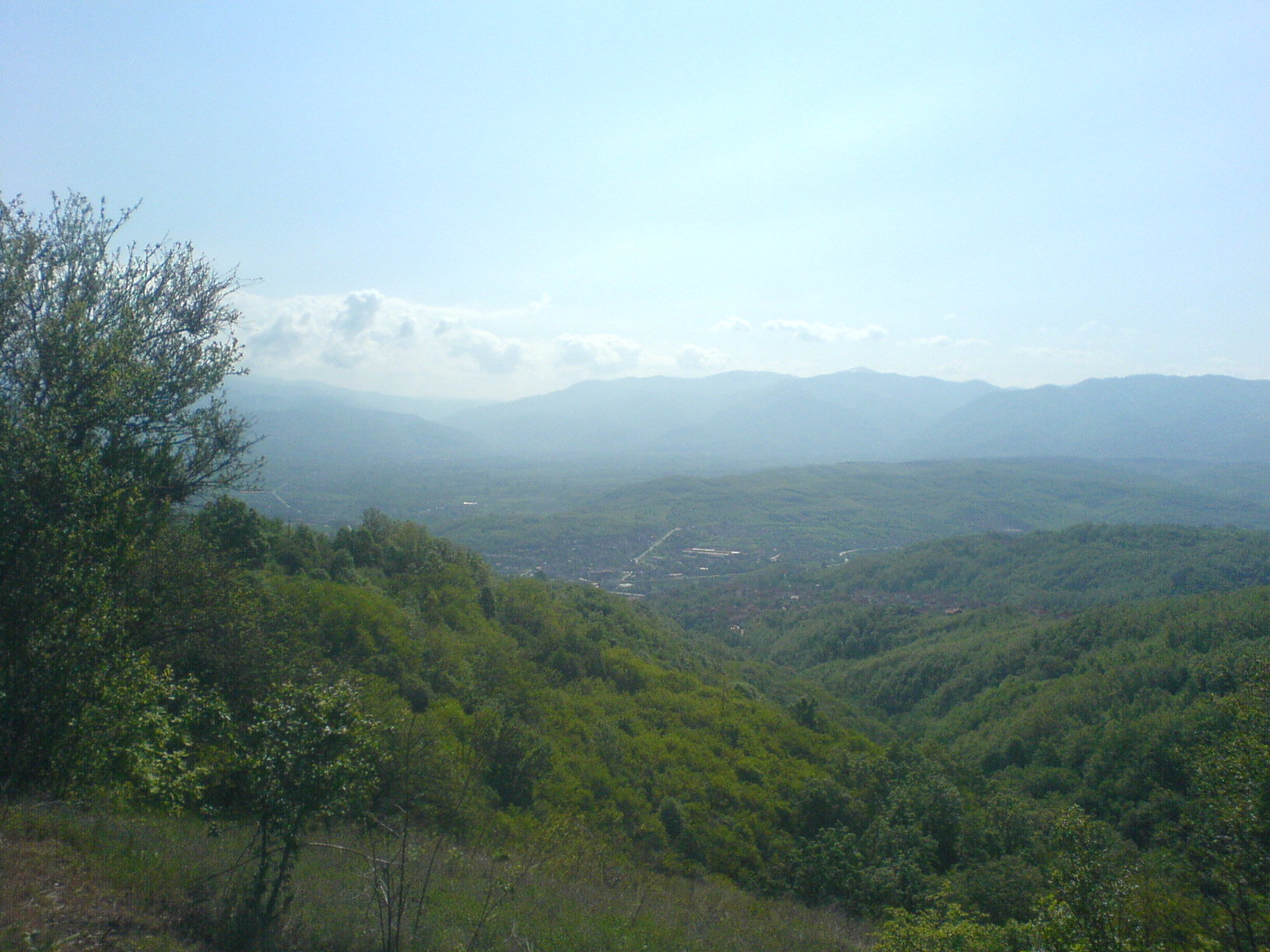

- Location within Serbia
- Coordinates: 42°43′45″N 22°05′20″E
- Country: Serbia
- District: Pčinja District
- Municipality: Vladičin Han

Population (2002)
  - Total: 152
- Time zone: UTC+1 (CET)
  - Summer (DST): UTC+2 (CEST)

Donje Jabukovo is a village in the municipality of Vladičin Han, Serbia. At the 2002 census, the village had a population of 152.
