= Manajle =

Manojle
- Village
- Location within Serbia
- Coordinates: 42°44′46″N 22°04′23″E
- Country: Serbia
- District: Pčinja District
- Municipality: Vladičin Han

Population (2002)
  - Total: 60
- Time zone: UTC+1 (CET)
  - Summer (DST): UTC+2 (CEST)

Manojle is a village in the municipality of Vladičin Han, Serbia. According to the 2002 census, the village has a population of 60 people.
