= State Road 45 (Serbia) =

Road in Serbia

State Road 45
- Serbian: Državni put IB reda 45; Serbian Cyrillic: Државни пут IБ реда 45
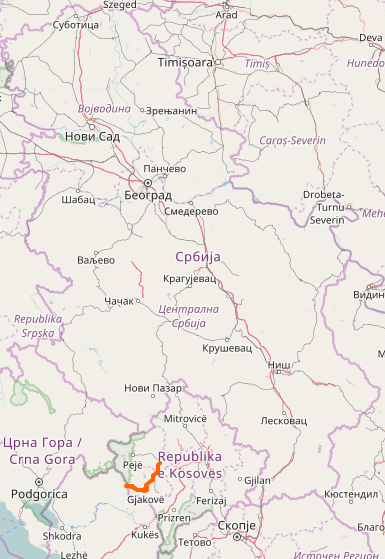

Route information
- Maintained by Ministria e Infrastrukturës (RKS)
- Length: 52.988 km (32.925 mi)

Major junctions
- From: Dolac
- To: Kosovo-Albania border at Morina, State Road SH-22

Location
- Country: Serbia
- Districts: Peja, Gjakova

Highway system
- Roads in Serbia; Motorways
← 42	→ 46

State Road 45 is an IB-class road in Kosovo, connecting Dolac with Morina.

Before the new road categorization regulation given in 2013, the route wore the name M 9.1.

The existing route is a main road with two traffic lanes.

== Sections ==
Section number	Length	Distance	Section name
04501	13.727 km 8.530 mi	13.727 km 8.530 mi	Dolac (Hramovik) - Hramovik
04502	17.401 km 10.812 mi	31.128 km 19.342 mi	Hramovik - Gjakova (Bistražin)
04503	1.829 km 1.136 mi	32.957 km 20.479 mi	Gjakova (Bistražin) - Gjakova (Ćafa Prušit)
04504	12.817 km 7.964 mi	45.774 km 28.443 mi	Gjakova (Ćafa Prušit) - Ponoševac
04505	7.214 km 4.483 mi	52.988 km 32.925 mi	Ponoševac - Kosovo-Albania border (Morina)

== See also ==
- Roads in Kosovo
- Roads in Serbia
