= Repince =

- Village
- Location within Serbia
- Coordinates: 42°41′59″N 22°03′32″E
- Country: Serbia
- District: Pčinja District
- Municipality: Vladičin Han

Population (2002)
  - Total: 972
- Time zone: UTC+1 (CET)
  - Summer (DST): UTC+2 (CEST)

Repince is a village in the municipality of Vladičin Han, Serbia. According to the 2002 census, the village has a population of 972 people.
