= Džep =

Džep Џеп
- Village
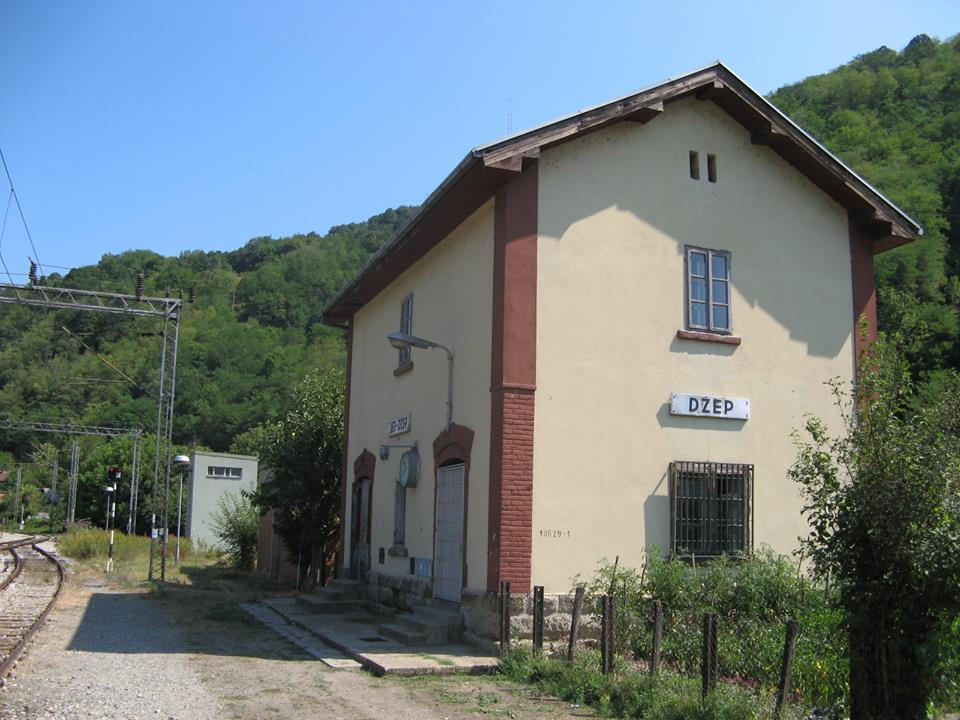
- Džep rail station in 2016

- Location within Serbia
- Coordinates: 42°46′N 22°05′E
- Country: Serbia

Population (2022)
  - Total: 137
- Time zone: UTC+1 (CET)
  - Summer (DST): UTC+2 (CEST)

Džep (Serbian: Џеп) is a village in Serbia located in the municipality of Vladičin Han, district of Pčinja. In 2022 it had 137 inhabitants.
