= Mazarać =

Mazarać Mazaraç (Albanian)
- Village
- Location within Serbia
- Coordinates: 42°35′30″N 21°59′45″E
- Country: Serbia
- District: Pčinja District
- Municipality: Vladičin Han

Population (2002)
  - Total: 197
- Time zone: UTC+1 (CET)
  - Summer (DST): UTC+2 (CEST)

Mazarać is a village in the municipality of Vladičin Han, Serbia. According to the 2002 census, the village has a population of 197 people.

The name of the village possibly comes from the Albanian word Mazarak or Mazrek which means horse breeder.
