= Goran Mladenović =

Serbian politician

Goran Mladenović (Serbian Cyrillic: Горан Младеновић; born 13 December 1979) is a politician in Serbia. He served in the National Assembly of Serbia from 2014 to 2016 and is currently in his third term as mayor of Vladičin Han in the south of the country. Mladenović is a member of the Serbian Progressive Party.

== Early life and career ==
Mladenovič was born in Surdulica, in what was then the Socialist Republic of Serbia in the Socialist Federal Republic of Yugoslavia. He was raised in nearby Vladičin Han and graduated from the University of Niš Faculty of Economics. He became commercial director of his family's auto parts company Vrla Komerc in 2004 and founded his own company in 2009.

== Politician ==
Mladenović began his political career as a member of the far-right Serbian Radical Party, running unsuccessfully as the party's candidate for mayor of Vladičin Han in the 2004 Serbian local elections. He became president of the municipal board of the Radical Party in 2008.

The Radical Party experienced a serious split in late 2008, with several members joining the more moderate Progressive Party under the leadership of Tomislav Nikolić and Aleksandar Vučić. Mladenović sided with the Progressives. He appeared in the lead position on the party's electoral list in the 2012 local elections and was elected when it won six of out of thirty-seven mandates. No party won a clear victory in the Vladičin Han election, and the Progressives subsequently joined a coalition government with Mladenović as president (i.e., mayor) of the municipality.

Mladenović received the 170th position on the Progressive Party's Aleksandar Vučić — Future We Believe In list in the 2014 Serbian parliamentary election and missed direct election when the list won 158 out of 250 mandates. He was awarded a mandate on 3 October 2014 as the replacement for another party member and served with the government's majority. He was required to resign as mayor when he joined the national assembly, as he could not hold a dual mandate.

He received the 197th position on the Progressive list in the 2016 parliamentary election and was not re-elected when the list won 131 mandates. He appeared in the lead position on the Progressive list in the concurrent 2016 local elections, however, and was chosen for a second term as mayor after the list won eighteen mandates.

Mladenović again led the local Progressive list in the 2020 local elections and continued as mayor after the list won a majority victory with twenty-four mandates. In a December 2020 interview, he highlighted the importance of Pan-European Corridor X for providing jobs in his community and advocated the linkage of Vladičin Han with a gas pipeline in Bulgaria to attract investment.
