= State Road 46 (Serbia) =

Road in central and western Serbia

State Road 46
- Serbian: Državni put IB reda 46; Serbian Cyrillic: Државни пут IБ реда 46

Route information
- Maintained by JP "Putevi Srbije"
- Length: 22.505 km (13.984 mi)

Major junctions
- From: 24 at Ravni Gaj
- 380 at Knić
- To: 22 at Mrčajevci

Location
- Country: Serbia
- Districts: Šumadija, Moravica

Highway system
- Roads in Serbia; Motorways
← 45	→ 47

State Road 46 is an IB-class road in central and western Serbia, connecting Ravni Gaj with Mrčajevci. It is located in Šumadija and Western Serbia.

Before the new road categorization regulation given in 2013, the route wore the following names: M 23 (before 2012) / 155 (after 2012).

The existing route is a main road with two traffic lanes. By the valid Space Plan of Republic of Serbia the road is not planned for upgrading to motorway, and is expected to be conditioned in its current state.

== Sections ==
Section number	Length	Distance	Section name
04601	5.099 km (3.168 mi)	5.099 km (3.168 mi)	Ravni Gaj – Knić
04602	17.406 km (10.816 mi)	22.505 km (13.984 mi)	Knić – Mrčajevci

== See also ==
- Roads in Serbia
