= Ružić (Vladičin Han) =

- Village
- Location within Serbia
- Country: Serbia
- Region: Southern and Eastern Serbia
- District: Pčinja
- Municipality: Vladičin Han

Population (2002)
  - Total: 181
- Time zone: UTC+1 (CET)
  - Summer (DST): UTC+2 (CEST)

Ružić is a village in the municipality of Vladičin Han, Serbia. According to the 2002 census, the village has a population of 181 people.
