= Prvoslav Davinić =

Serbian politician and lawyer (1938–2025)

- Првослав Давинић
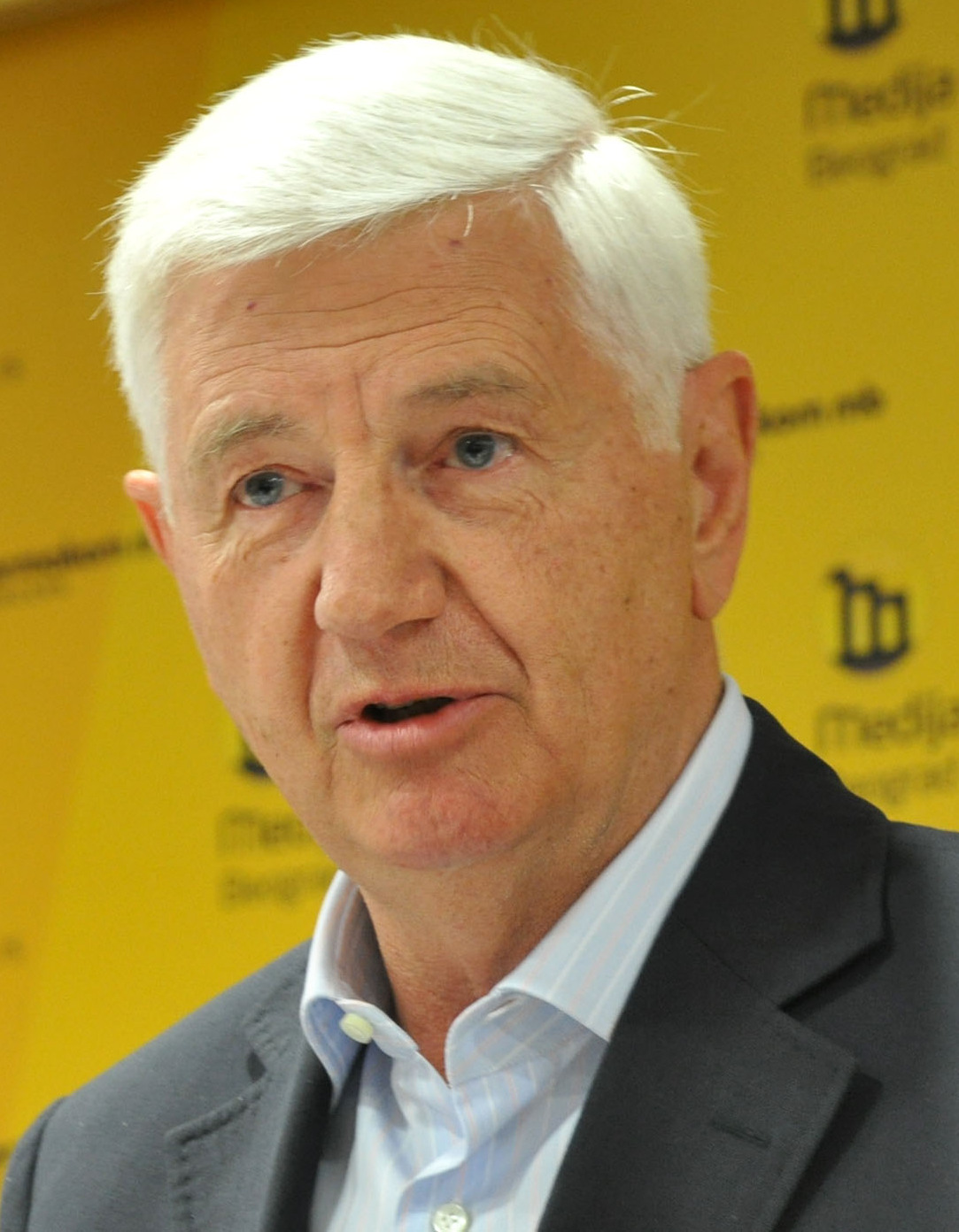
- Davinić in 2008

Minister of Defence of Serbia and Montenegro
- In office 16 April 2004 – 21 October 2005
- President: Svetozar Marović
- Preceded by: Boris Tadić
- Succeeded by: Zoran Stanković

Personal details
- Born: 19 February 1938 Belgrade, Yugoslavia
- Died: September 2025 (aged 87) Belgrade, Serbia
- Party: G17 Plus
- Other political affiliations: League of Communists of Yugoslavia
- Education: University of Belgrade
- Occupation: Politician, lawyer

Prvoslav Davinić (Serbian Cyrillic: Првослав Давинић, pronounced [př̩ʋoslaʋ daˈʋinitɕ]; 19 February 1938 – September 2025) was a Serbian politician and lawyer, who served as Minister of Defence of Serbia and Montenegro from 2004 to 2005.

== Biography ==
He graduated from the Faculty of Law of the University of Belgrade (1963). He obtained his master's degree (1968) and doctorate (1976) from the same university. In 1994, he received his doctorate in international relations from the University of Pennsylvania. He was a member of the League of Communists of Yugoslavia. He worked at the IMPP Institute of International Relations and Economics in Belgrade and at the SIPRI Institute in Stockholm. From 1976 to 1999, he worked at the UN, focusing on disarmament issues, among other things. From 1999 to 2003, he worked in the Ministry of Foreign Affairs of FR Yugoslavia as an ambassador, serving as an advisor to the minister. He then retired. In 2003, he joined the G17 Plus party. From 2004 to 2005, he served as Minister of Defence in the Council of Ministers of Serbia and Montenegro.

He was later subject to six criminal proceedings concerning alleged abuses during his time as minister. By 2013, he had been acquitted in four of them.

Government offices
| Preceded by Boris Tadić | Minister of Defence of Serbia and Montenegro; 2004–2005 | Succeeded by Zoran Stanković |
