= Manjak (Vladičin Han) =

Manjak Мањак
- Village
- Location within Serbia
- Coordinates: 42°46′05″N 22°07′53″E
- Country: Serbia
- District: Pčinja District
- Municipality: Vladičin Han

Population (2011)
  - Total: 375
- Time zone: UTC+1 (CET)
  - Summer (DST): UTC+2 (CEST)

Manjak is a village in the municipality of Vladičin Han, Serbia. According to the 2011 census, the village has a population of 375 people.
