= Repište (Vladičin Han) =

- Village
- Location within Serbia
- Coordinates: 42°48′38″N 22°05′14″E
- Country: Serbia
- District: Pčinja District
- Municipality: Vladičin Han

Population (2002)
  - Total: 344
- Time zone: UTC+1 (CET)
  - Summer (DST): UTC+2 (CEST)

Repište is a village in the municipality of Vladičin Han, Serbia. According to the 2002 census, the village has a population of 344 people.
