= Brestovo (Vladičin Han) =

Brestovo Брестово
- Village
- Location within Serbia
- Coordinates: 42°42′32″N 21°59′09″E
- Country: Serbia
- District: Pčinja District
- Municipality: Vladičin Han

Population (2002)
  - Total: 115
- Time zone: UTC+1 (CET)
  - Summer (DST): UTC+2 (CEST)

Brestovo is a village in the municipality of Vladičin Han, Serbia. According to the 2002 census, the village has a population of 115 people.
