= Kukavica (Vladičin Han) =

Kukavica Кукавица
- Village
- Location within Serbia
- Coordinates: 42°45′12″N 21°58′13″E
- Country: Serbia
- Region: Southern and Eastern Serbia
- District: Pčinja
- Municipality: Vladičin Han

Population (2002)
  - Total: 20
- Time zone: UTC+1 (CET)
  - Summer (DST): UTC+2 (CEST)

Kukavica is a village in the municipality of Vladičin Han, Serbia. According to the 2002 census, the village has a population of 20 people.
