= State Road 41 (Serbia) =

Road in Serbia

State Road 41
- Serbian: Državni put IB reda 41; Serbian Cyrillic: Државни пут IБ реда 41

Route information
- Maintained by JP "Putevi Srbije" (SRB) / Ministria e Infrastrukturës (RKS)
- Length: 82.887 km (51.504 mi) 0.610 km (0.379 mi) unconstructed 83.497 km (51.883 mi) planned 13.979 km (8.686 mi) (excluding Kosovo); 14.589 km (9.065 mi) (planned excluding Kosovo)

Major junctions
- From: Bujanovac E75
- To: Serbia-Kosovo border at Končulj, State Road M-25; Štimlje State Road M-25

Location
- Country: Serbia
- Districts: Pčinja, (SRB) / Gjilan, Ferizaj (RKS)

Highway system
- Roads in Serbia; Motorways
← 40	→ 42

State Road 41 is an IB-class road in southern Serbia and Kosovo, connecting Bujanovac with Štimlje.

Before the new road categorization regulation given in 2013, the route wore the following names: P 125б and P 214 and M 25.3 (before 2012) / 132 and 34 (after 2012).

The existing route is a main road with two traffic lanes. By the valid Space Plan of the Republic of Serbia, its section of the road is not planned for upgrading to a motorway and is expected to be conditioned in its current state.

== Sections ==
Section number	Length	Distance	Section name
04101	1.188 km (0.738 mi)	1.188 km (0.738 mi)	Bujanovac-south interchange - Bujanovac (0.610 km (0.379 mi) unconstructed)
04102	1.136 km (0.706 mi)	2.324 km (1.444 mi)	Bujanovac - Bujanovac (Veliki Trnovac)
04103	12.265 km (7.621 mi)	14.589 km (9.065 mi)	Bujanovac (Veliki Trnovac) - Kosovo border (Končulj)
Sections inside Kosovo
04104	3.466 km (2.154 mi)	18.055 km (11.219 mi)	Kosovo border (Končulj) - Domorovce
04105	2.071 km (1.287 mi)	20.126 km (12.506 mi)	Domorovce - Donje Korminjane
04106	16.960 km (10.538 mi)	37.086 km (23.044 mi)	Donje Korminjane - Gjilan (Gornji Makreš)
04107	0.150 km (0.093 mi)	37.236 km (23.137 mi)	Gjilan(Gornji Makreš) - Gjilan(Dobrčane)
04108	0.088 km (0.055 mi)	37.324 km (23.192 mi)	Gjilan (Dobrčane) - Gjilan
04109	5.235 km (3.253 mi)	42.559 km (26.445 mi)	Gjilan - Livoč
04110	8.612 km (5.351 mi)	51.171 km (31.796 mi)	Livoč - Klokot
04111	17.399 km (10.811 mi)	68.570 km (42.607 mi)	Klokot - Ferizaj
04112	2.618 km (1.627 mi)	71.188 km (44.234 mi)	Ferizaj - Ferizaj (Jezerce)
04113	7.127 km (4.429 mi)	78.315 km (48.663 mi)	Ferizaj (Jezerce) - Košare
04114	5.182 km (3.220 mi)	83.947 km (52.162 mi)	Košare - Štimlje

== See also ==
- Roads in Serbia
- Roads in Kosovo
