= Vrbovo (Vladičin Han) =

Vrbovo Врбово
- Village
- Location within Serbia
- Coordinates: 42°37′41″N 22°03′14″E
- Country: Serbia
- Region: Southern and Eastern Serbia
- District: Pčinja
- Municipality: Vladičin Han

Population (2002)
  - Total: 357
- Time zone: UTC+1 (CET)
  - Summer (DST): UTC+2 (CEST)

Vrbovo is a village in the municipality of Vladičin Han, Serbia. According to the 2002 census, the village has a population of 357 people.
