= Stubal (Vladičin Han) =

Stubal Стубал
- Village
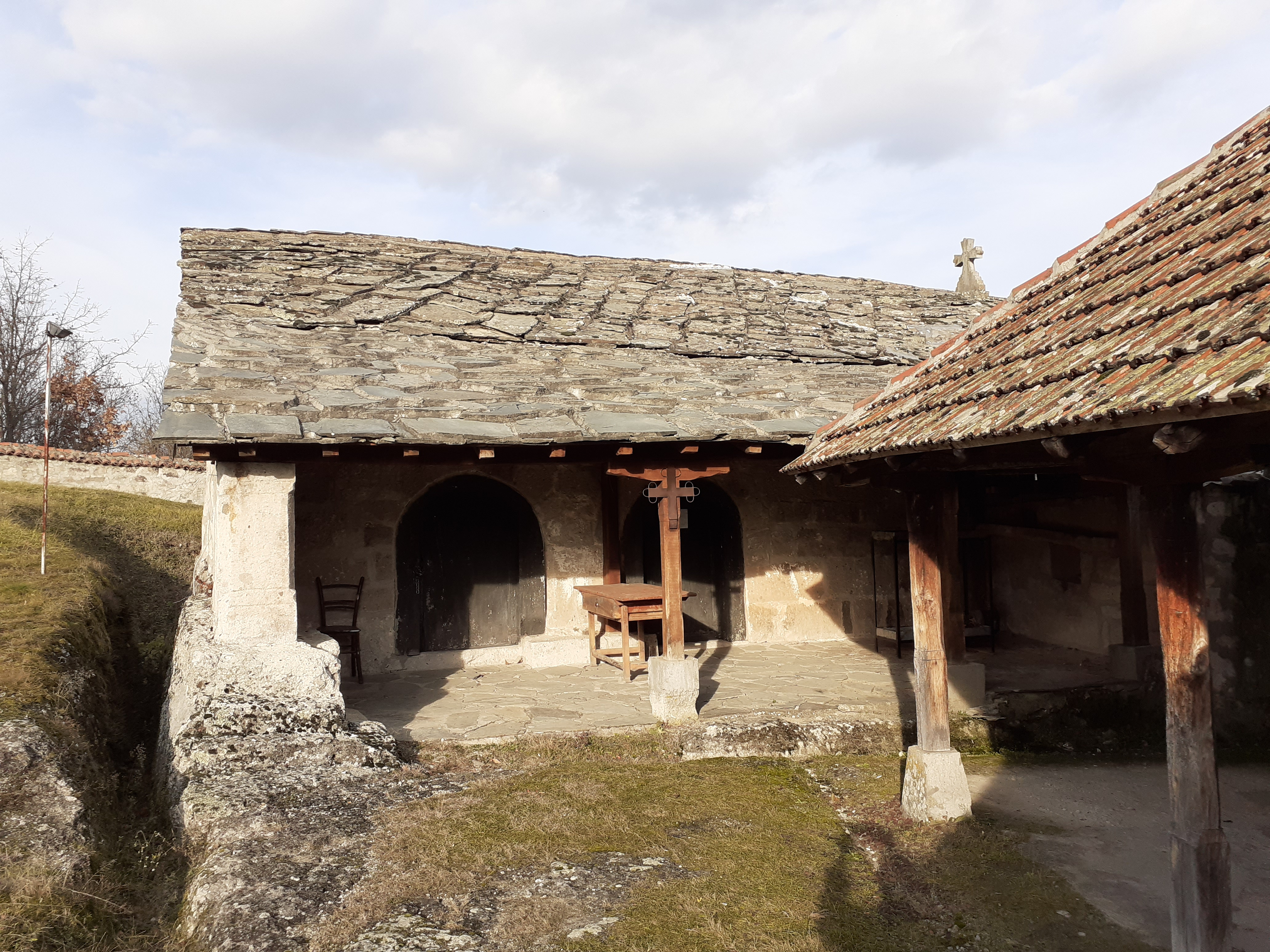
- Old church in Stubal

- Location within Serbia
- Coordinates: 42°37′59″N 22°01′47″E
- Country: Serbia
- District: Pčinja District
- Municipality: Vladičin Han

Population (2002)
  - Total: 1,113
- Time zone: UTC+1 (CET)
  - Summer (DST): UTC+2 (CEST)

Stubal is a village in the municipality of Vladičin Han, Serbia. According to the 2002 census, the village has a population of 1113 people.
