= Prodancha =

Prodancha Проданча
- Village
- Location of Prodancha
- Coordinates: 42°52′32″N 22°45′11″E
- Country: Bulgaria
- Provinces (Oblast): Pernik

Government
  - Mayor: Stanislav Nikolov
- Elevation: 825 m (2,707 ft)

Population (2005)
  - Total: 7
- Time zone: UTC+2 (EET)
  - Summer (DST): UTC+3 (EEST)
- Postal Code: 2471
- Area code: 07733
- License plate: PK

Prodancha (Bulgarian: Проданча) is a small village in Tran Municipality, Pernik Province. It is located in western Bulgaria, 67 km from the capital city of Sofia. The village's name was first attested in 1447 as Prodancha; 15th–17th century sources also hint at the variants Prodankovitsa and Prodantsi. The name stems from the personal name Prodan, its affectionate derivative Prodancho or its derivative adjective Prodancha in an accusative–genitive form.
