= Lepenica, Croatia =

Settlement in Šibenik-Knin County, Croatia

Lepenica
- Settlement
- Interactive map of Lepenica
- Location of Lepenica in Croatia
- Coordinates: 43°38′05″N 16°05′49″E
- Country: Croatia
- County: Šibenik-Knin
- City: Šibenik

Area
  - Total: 4.7 km^{2} (1.8 sq mi)

Population (2021)
  - Total: 62
  - Density: 13/km^{2} (34/sq mi)
- Time zone: UTC+1 (CET)
  - Summer (DST): UTC+2 (CEST)
- Postal code: 22000 Šibenik
- Area code: +385 (0)22

Lepenica is a settlement in the City of Šibenik in Croatia. In 2021, its population was 62.

== Demographics ==
Lepenica: Population trends 1857–2021
v

population	128	125	117	124	145	160	170	200	186	193	216	209	145	109	89	68	62
	1857	1869	1880	1890	1900	1910	1921	1931	1948	1953	1961	1971	1981	1991	2001	2011	2021

Sources: Croatian Bureau of Statistics publications
