= Tegovište =

- Village
- Location within Serbia
- Coordinates: 42°45′43″N 22°04′19″E
- Country: Serbia
- District: Pčinja District
- Municipality: Vladičin Han

Population (2002)
  - Total: 183
- Time zone: UTC+1 (CET)
  - Summer (DST): UTC+2 (CEST)

Tegovište (Serbian Cyrillic: Теговиште) is a village in the municipality of Vladičin Han, Serbia. According to the 2002 census, the village has a population of 183 people.
