= Jastrebac (Vladičin Han) =

Jastrebac Јастребац
- Village
- Location within Serbia
- Coordinates: 42°46′24″N 22°02′42″E
- Country: Serbia
- District: Pčinja District
- Municipality: Vladičin Han

Population (2002)
  - Total: 221
- Time zone: UTC+1 (CET)
  - Summer (DST): UTC+2 (CEST)

Jastrebac is a village in the municipality of Vladičin Han, Serbia. According to the 2002 census, the village has a population of 221 people.
