= Jastrebac (Zenica) =

Jastrebac Јастребац
- Village
- Location within Bosnia and Herzegovina
- Coordinates: 44°20′29″N 17°49′32″E
- Country: Bosnia and Herzegovina
- Entity: Federation of Bosnia and Herzegovina
- Canton: Zenica-Doboj
- Municipality: Zenica

Area
  - Total: 2.37 sq mi (6.14 km^{2})

Population (2013)
  - Total: 423
  - Density: 178/sq mi (68.9/km^{2})
- Time zone: UTC+1 (CET)
  - Summer (DST): UTC+2 (CEST)

Jastrebac (Cyrillic: Јастребац) is a village in the City of Zenica, Bosnia and Herzegovina.

== Demographics ==
According to the 2013 Census, its population was 423, all Bosniaks.
