= Čukarka =

Čukarka Чукарка (Serbian) Çukarkë (Albanian)
- Village (Selo)
- Location within Serbia
- Coordinates: 42°17′03″N 21°42′01″E
- Country: Serbia
- District: Pčinja District
- Municipality: Preševo

Area
  - Total: 4.15 km^{2} (1.60 sq mi)

Population (2002)
  - Total: 512
- Time zone: UTC+1 (CET)
  - Summer (DST): UTC+2 (CEST)

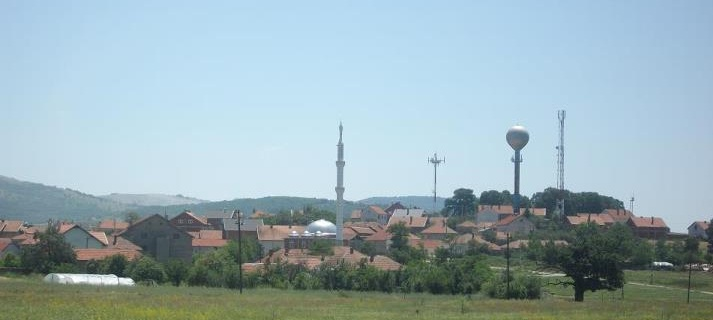
Cukarka is located in the south-eastern part of Preševo.

Čukarka (Serbian Cyrillic: Чукарка; Albanian: Çukarkë) is a village located in the municipality of Preševo, Serbia. According to the 2002 census, the village has a population of 512 people. Of these, 427 (83,39 %) were ethnic Albanians, and 85 (16,60 %) were Serbs.
