= Nedelkovo =

Nedelkovo Неделково
- Village
- Location of Nedelkovo
- Coordinates: 42°47′54″N 22°47′12″E
- Country: Bulgaria
- Provinces (Oblast): Pernik Province

Government
  - Mayor: Gergana Nikolova
- Elevation: 923 m (3,028 ft)

Population (2007)
  - Total: 68
- Time zone: UTC+2 (EET)
  - Summer (DST): UTC+3 (EEST)
- Postal Code: 2477
- Area code: 07733

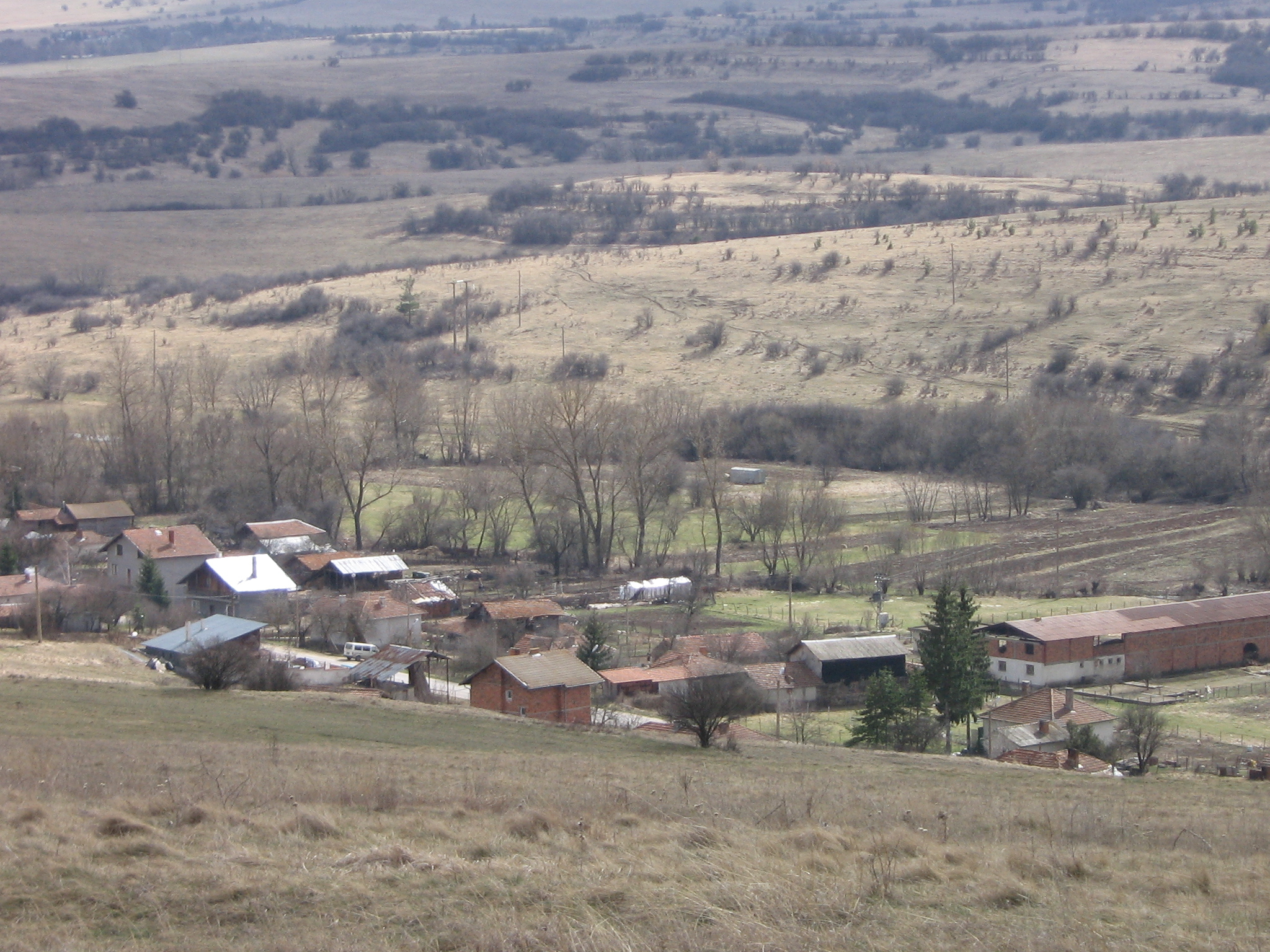
Nedelkovo

Nedelkovo (Bulgarian: Неделково) is a village in Tran Municipality near the small town of Tran, western Bulgaria. The village was named after the local partisan supporter Nedelko Savov in 1950; its old name was Baba, first mentioned as Babin Dol in 1451 and as Baba in 1453. The old name is derived either from the common noun baba (баба, "grandmother") or from the dialectal baba ("height, dome-like hill"), both equally possible.
