= Urvič (Vladičin Han) =

Urvič Урвич
- Village
- Location within Serbia
- Coordinates: 42°45′50″N 22°03′21″E
- Country: Serbia
- District: Pčinja District
- Municipality: Vladičin Han

Population (2002)
  - Total: 71
- Time zone: UTC+1 (CET)
  - Summer (DST): UTC+2 (CEST)

Urvič is a village in the municipality of Vladičin Han, Serbia. According to the 2002 census, the village has a population of 71 people.
