= Lepenica, Mačva =

Lepenica
- Village
- Location within Serbia
- Coordinates: 44°25′49″N 19°10′11″E
- Country: Serbia
- Time zone: UTC+1 (CET)
  - Summer (DST): UTC+2 (CEST)

Lepenica is a village in Mačva District, Central Serbia, Serbia.
