= Strezimirovci =

Strezimirovci Стрезимировци
- Village
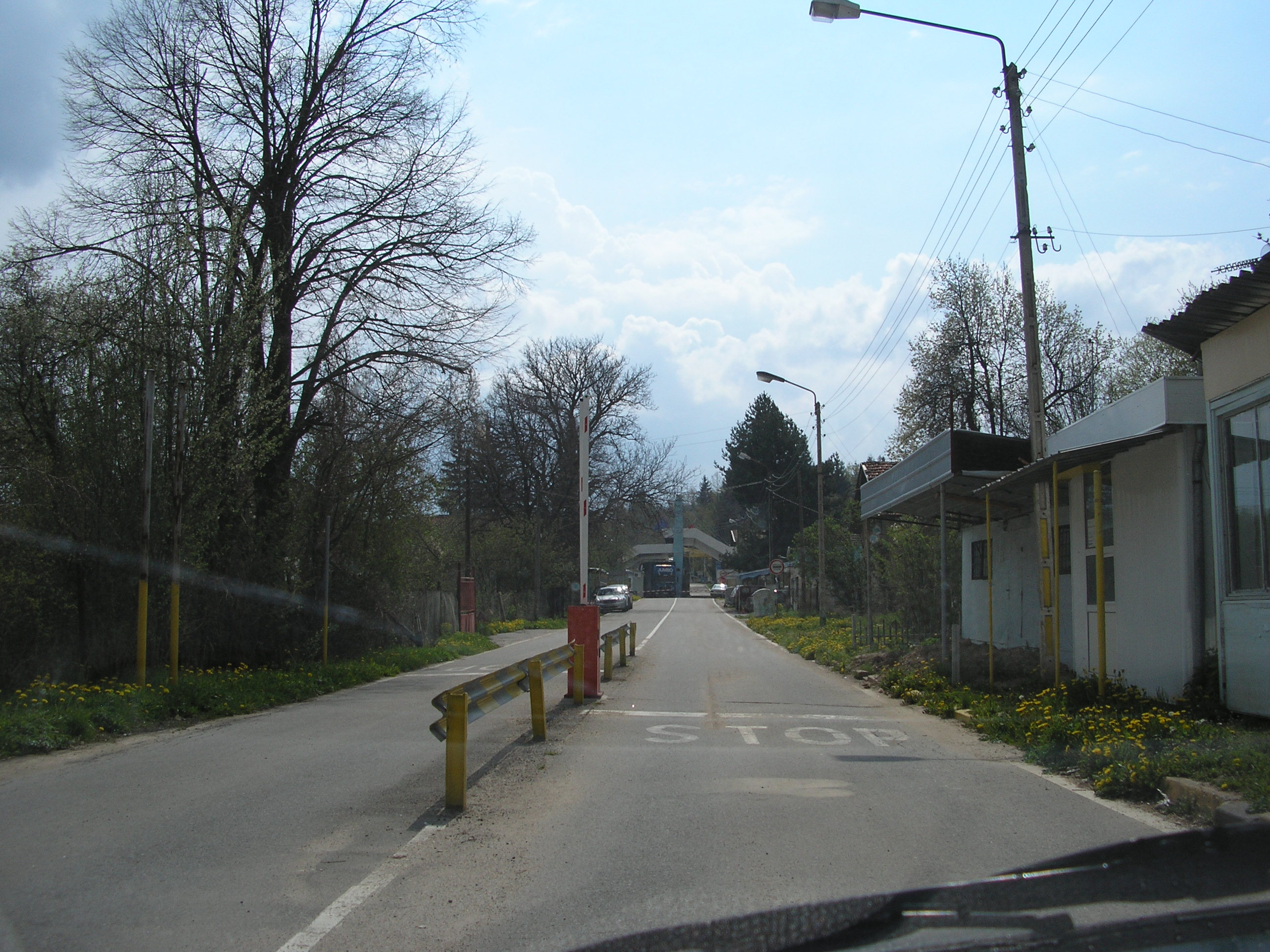
- Border checkpoint in Strezimirovci (Bulgarian side)

- Location within Bulgaria
- Coordinates: 42°48′N 22°26′E
- Country: Bulgaria, Serbia
- Province/District: Pernik, Pčinja
- Municipality: Tran, Surdulica
- Elevation: 830 m (2,720 ft)

Population (2008)
  - Total: 25 (BUL) 53 (SRB)

Strezimirovci (Serbian and Bulgarian: Стрезимировци; also Strezimirovtsi, Strezimirovtzi) is a divided village in easternmost Serbia and westernmost Bulgaria. The Bulgarian half of the village is part of Tran Municipality, Pernik Province, whereas the Serbian part belongs to Surdulica municipality, Pčinja District. The village has a border checkpoint, and its residents on either side of the border are mostly Bulgarian; however, its division has caused its population to decrease more than tenfold. It lies in the geographic region of Znepolje (Znepolјe), at 42°48′N 22°26′E, in a valley along the Jerma (or Erma) River, 830 metres above mean sea level.

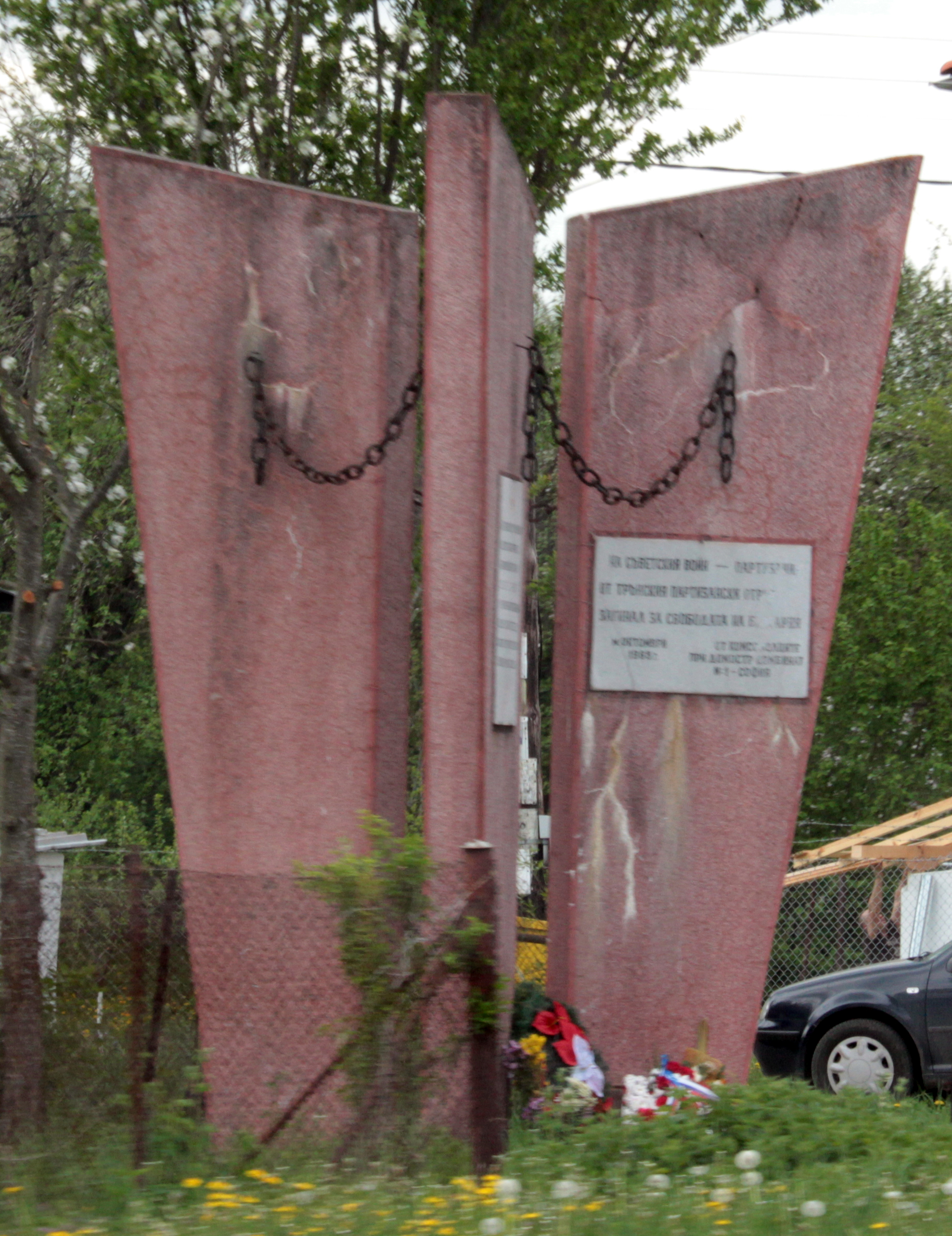
A war memorial to a Soviet Soldier in Strezimirovtsi

The village was first mentioned in Ottoman registers of 1451 as Stryazimirovtsi and in 1453 as İstrazumirofca. Its name is derived from the personal name Strezimir (Стрезимир). From the Liberation of Bulgaria in 1878 until the post-World War I Treaty of Neuilly-sur-Seine of 1919, Strezimirovci was located in Bulgaria and was administratively part of the Tran district of Sofia Province. As Bulgaria participated in the war on the side of the Central Powers, it was obliged to cede a Bulgarian-populated area of 1,545 km^{2} to Serbia, a region afterwards known in Bulgaria as the "Western Outlands". The new border did not take the location of extant communities, property, roads and rivers into account, it was drawn so as to give Serbia a strategic importance in future wars. Strezimirovci was among 25 villages more or less divided into two by the new Serbian-Bulgarian border. Reputedly, four locals even tricked the international commission sent to mark the border by moving the temporary border stones overnight in order to include more of the village in Bulgaria.

As a consequence of this bisection, the village's population has declined significantly on either side of the border. For example, the Serbian part had a population of 485 in 1948; by 2002, it had decreased to 53, of whom 47 Bulgarians (88.67%), 4 Yugoslavs (7.54%) and 2 Serbs (3.77%). The Bulgarian part of Strezimirovci is only inhabited by 25 people as of June 2008.

== See also ==
- Bulgarians in Serbia
- Western Outlands
- Other villages separated by the 1919 Bulgarian-Serbian border:
  - Donja Nevlja (SRB) / Dolna Nevlya (BUL)
  - Petačinci (SRB) / Bogoyna (BUL)
  - Vrapča (SRB) / Vrabcha (BUL)
  - Žeravino (SRB) / Zheravino (BUL)
