= Mraketintsi =

Mraketintsi Мракетинци
- Village
- Location of Mraketintsi
- Coordinates: 42°48′N 22°44′E
- Country: Bulgaria
- Provinces (Oblast): Pernik

Area
  - Land: 3.5 km^{2} (1.4 sq mi)
- Elevation: 805 m (2,641 ft)

Population (31-12-2013)
  - Total: 15
- Time zone: UTC+2 (EET)
  - Summer (DST): UTC+3 (EEST)
- Postal Code: 2477
- Area code: 07733

Mraketintsi (Bulgarian: Мракетинци) is a small village in Western Bulgaria, It is 65 kilometres (40 mi) west of Sofia and 10 kilometres (6.2 mi) east of Tran. Situated in the Pernik Province, it is part of the Tran Municipality. Mraketintsi has a permanent population of 15.

== Topography ==
Mraketintsi is situated in a high elevation, hilly region of Bulgaria. It is surrounded by thick forest in every direction. Route 63 passes through Mrakentintsi, on its way to Tran, from Pernik. The village also has a stream that flows into the River Yablanitsa which passes Mraketintsi alongside Route 63.

== Climate ==
The climate is temperate and characterised by four distinct seasons; Warm but not hot summers, with very cold winters. Spring is cool with plenty of precipitation, towards the end of March and beginning of April. Fall is warmer than spring but similar.

== Toponymy ==
The name of Mraketintsi (Bulgarian: Мракетинци) originates from the word (Bulgarian: Мрак) meaning 'Darkness'. According to locals this came about due to the history of the village, as it used to be a hiding place for Bulgarian liberation forces and rebel fighters at night, during the Russo-Turkish War.

== History ==
The first recorded written mention of the name/place Mraketintsi was in 1878. According to locals, Bulgarian liberation forces and rebel fighters would hide in Mraketintsi at night during the Russo-Turkish War and that's where the name comes from. It was seen a good hiding place due to it being well-hidden at night and easy to defend. Many of the older homes in the village have back doors and basements in case the Ottoman forces came so they could easily escape in the night. They would also cover the windows so no light would be seen. However, the war itself never made it to Mraketintsi.

Today, Mraketintsi faces the same fate as most of rural Bulgaria—depopulation. The village only has a permanent population of 15. Most of the houses are now being used as holiday villas that locals, now living in the large cities, only come to maintain and use in the summer.
