= Lepenica (Vladičin Han) =

- Village
- Location within Serbia
- Coordinates: 42°40′12″N 22°01′46″E
- Country: Serbia
- Region: Southern and Eastern Serbia
- District: Pčinja
- Municipality: Vladičin Han

Population (2002)
  - Total: 734
- Time zone: UTC+1 (CET)
  - Summer (DST): UTC+2 (CEST)

Lepenica is a village in the municipality of Vladičin Han, Serbia. According to the 2002 census, the village has a population of 734 people.
