= Vladičin Han =

Vladičin Han Владичин Хан (Serbian)
- Town and municipality
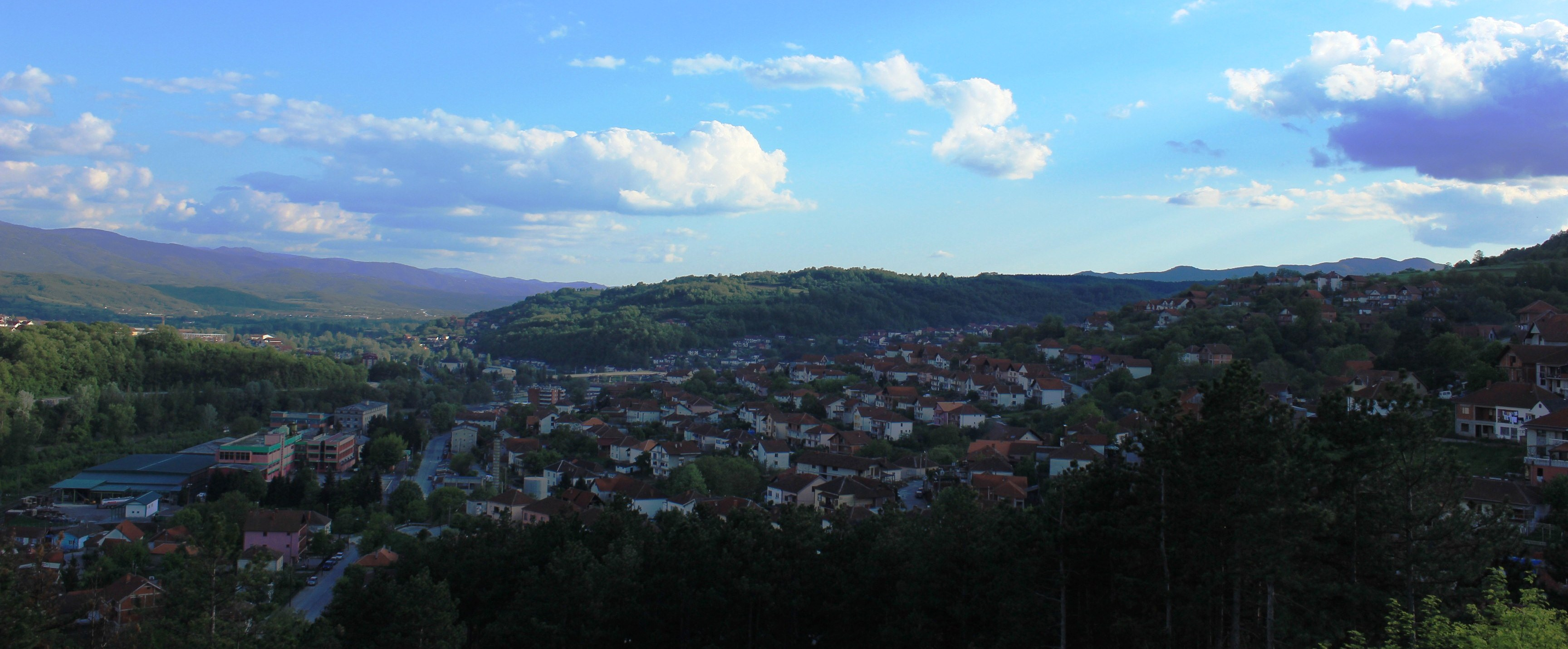
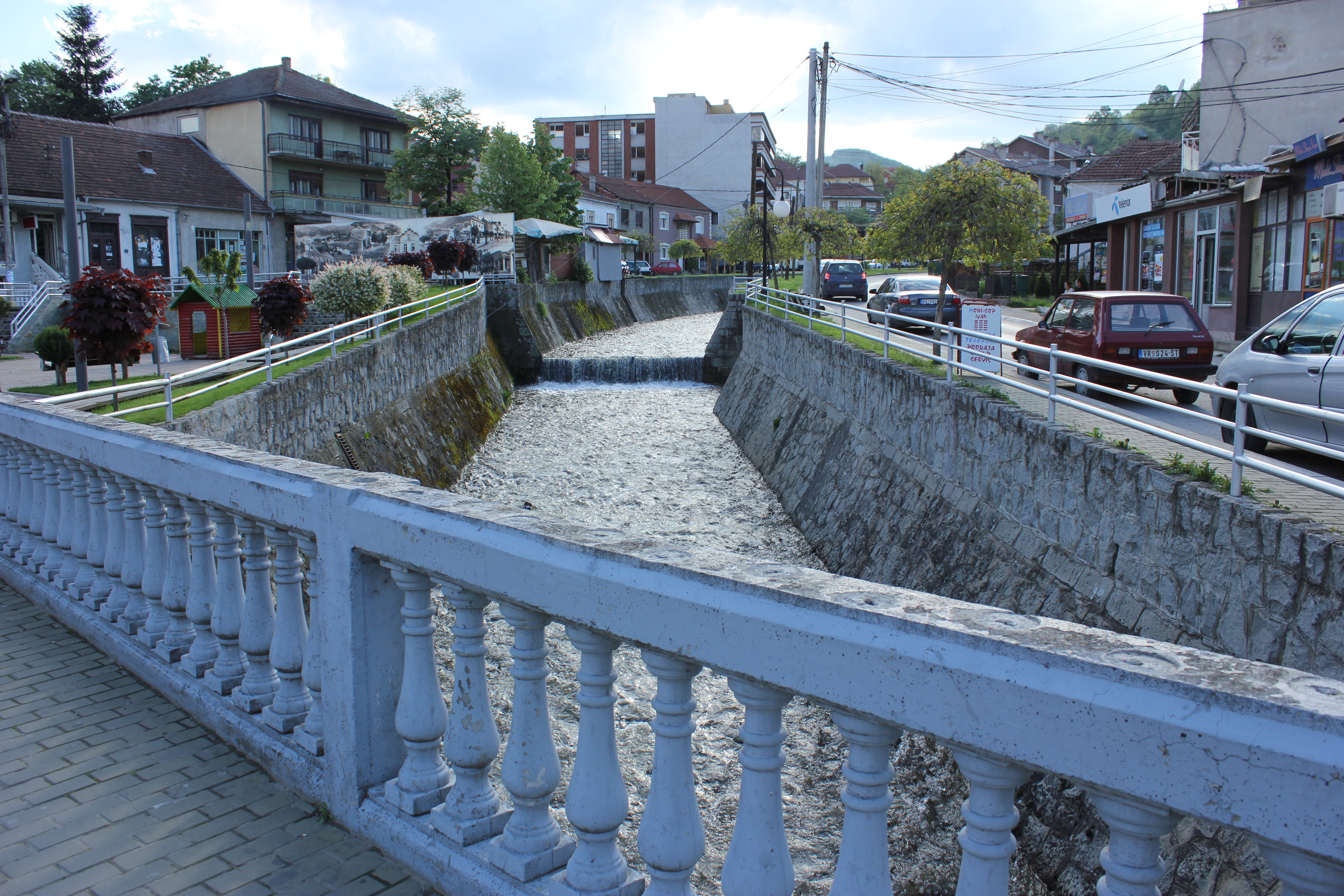
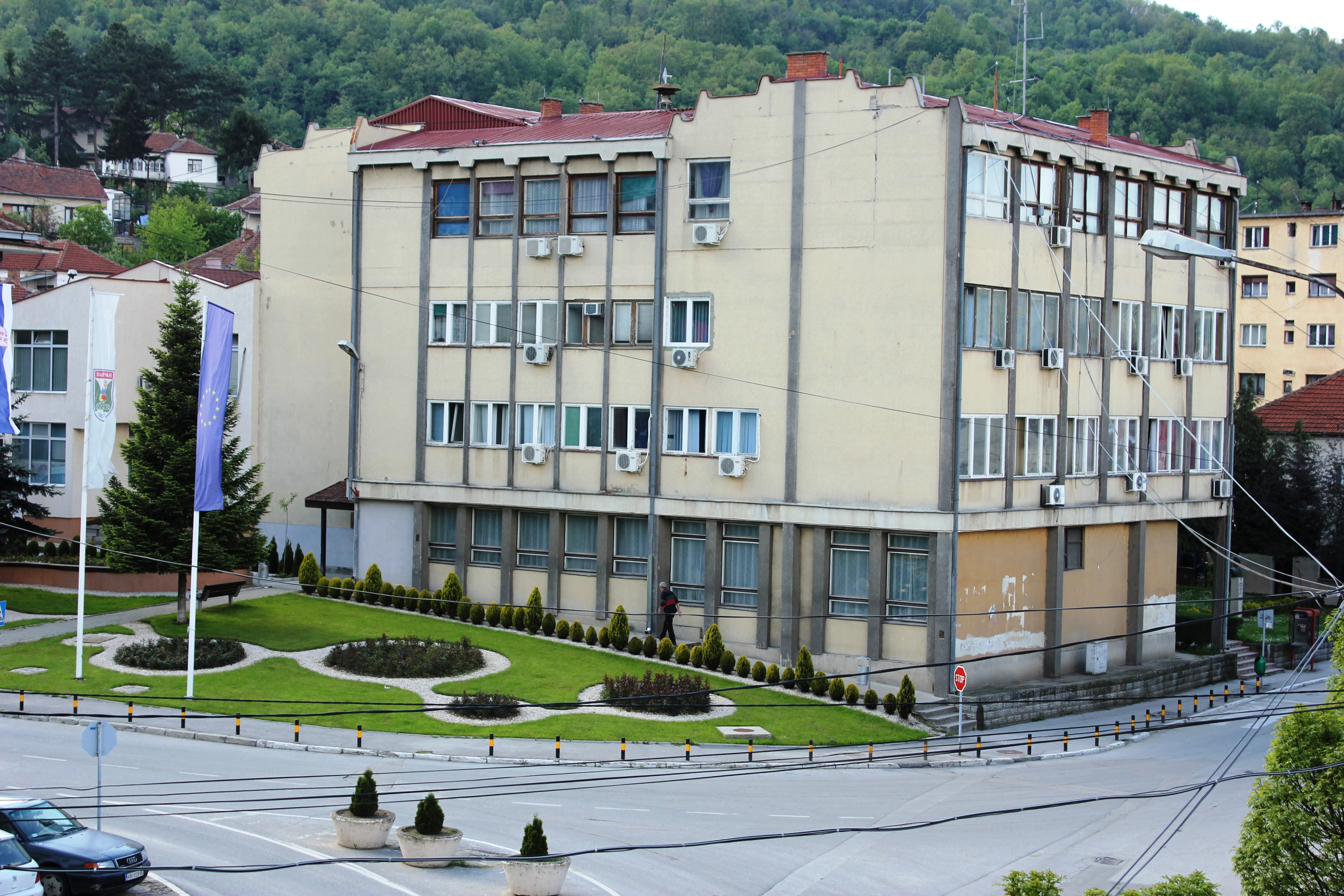
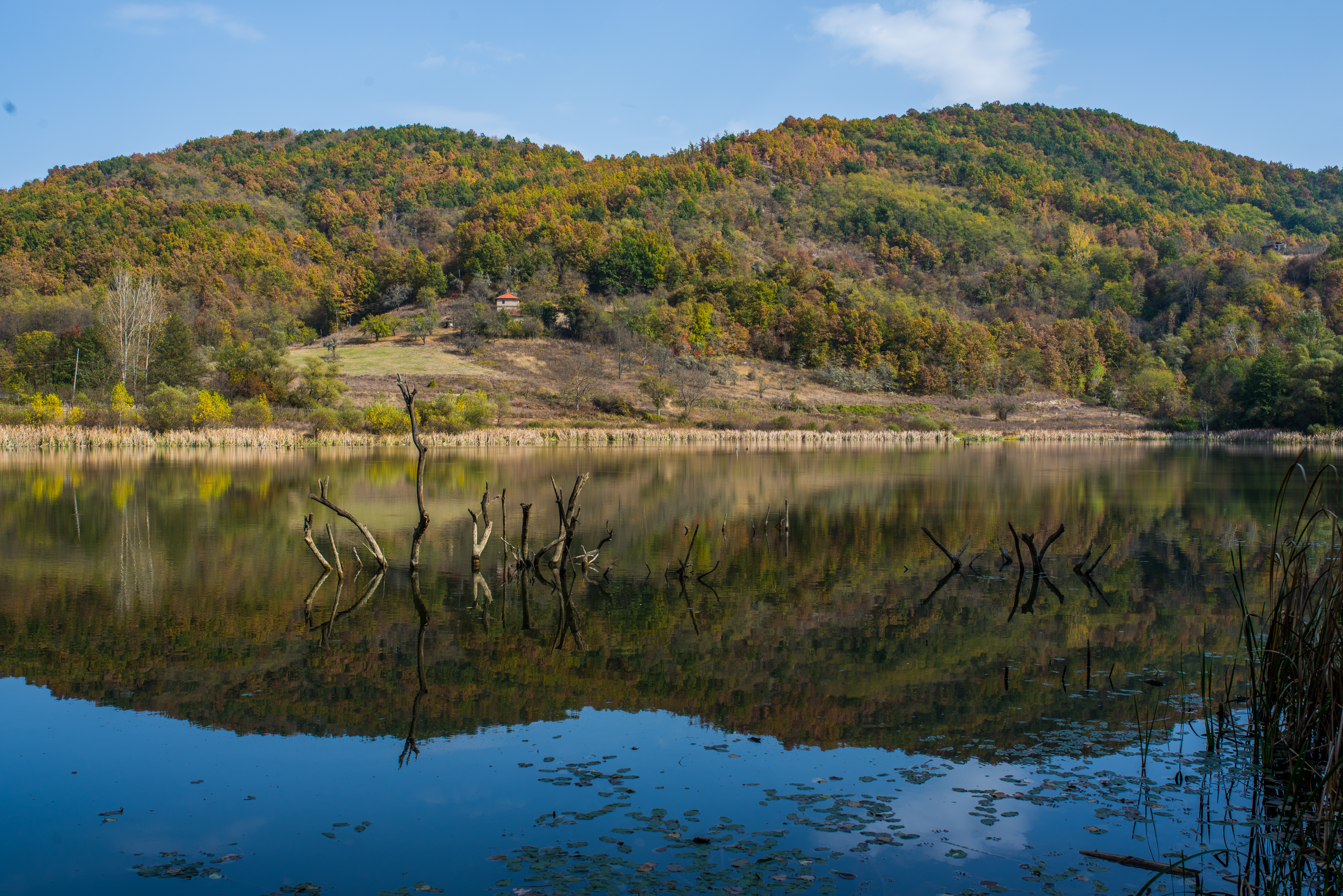
- From top left to right: Overview of the town; Kalimanka river; Townhall; and Jovačko lake

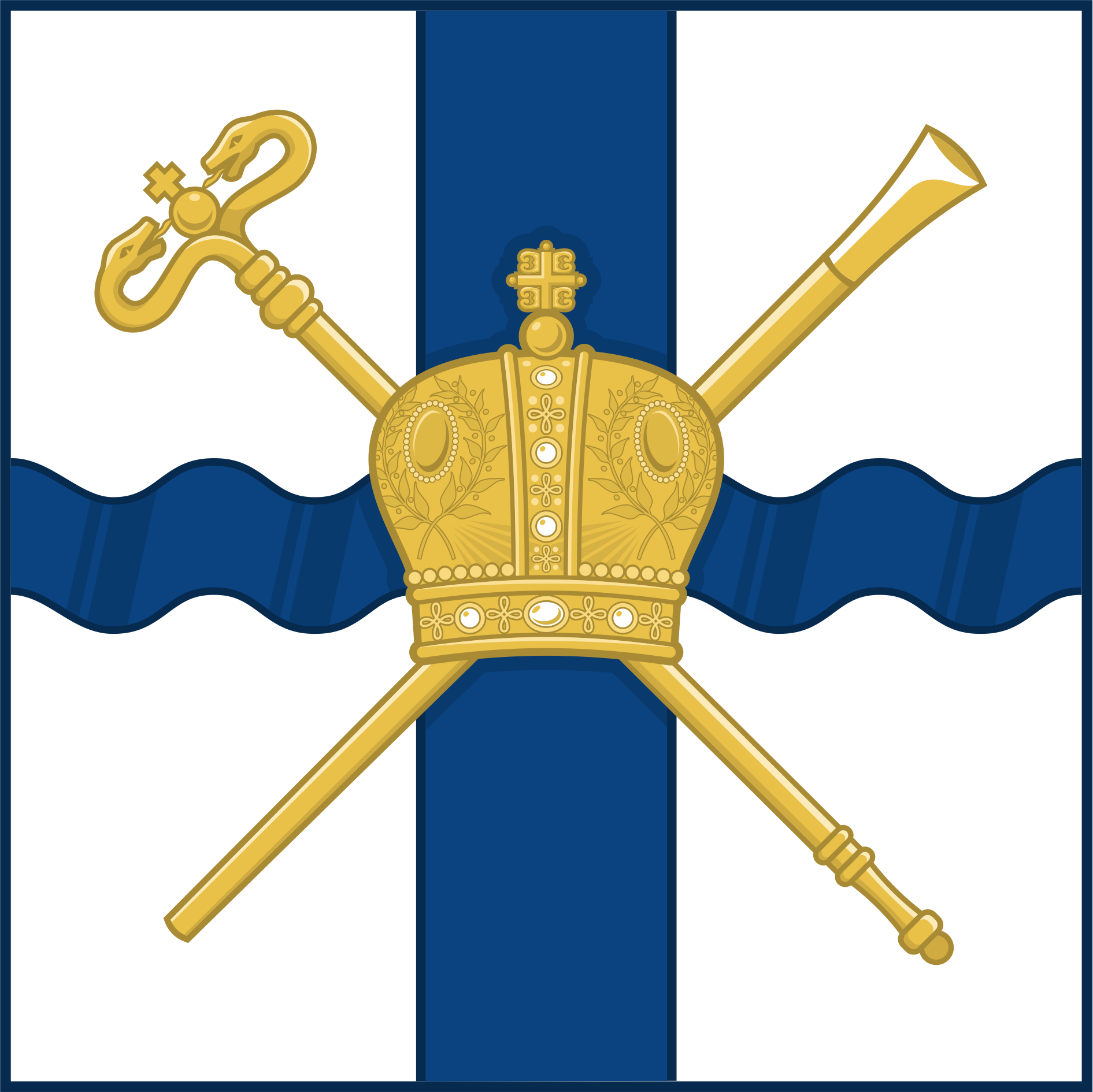
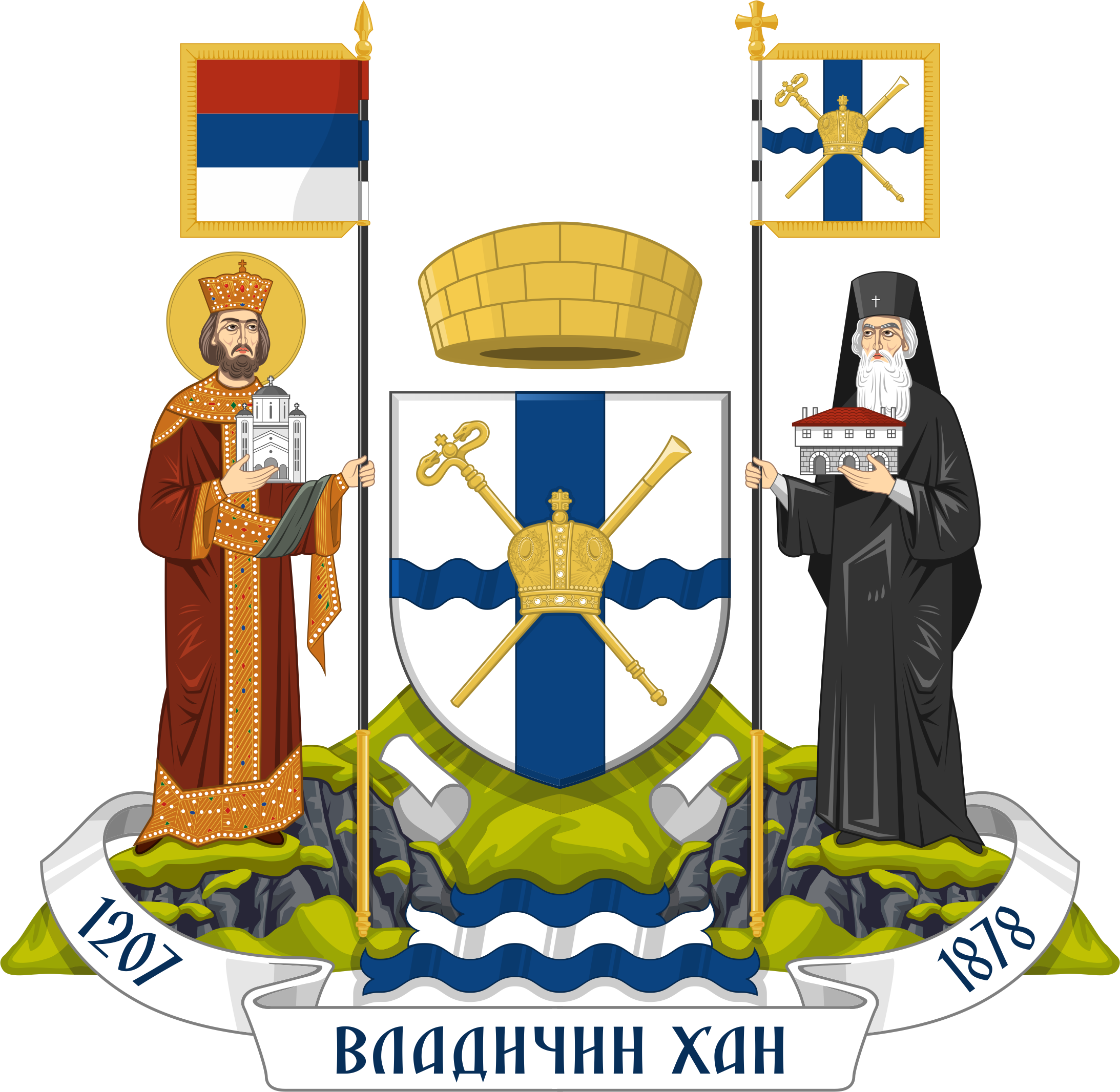
- Flag Coat of arms

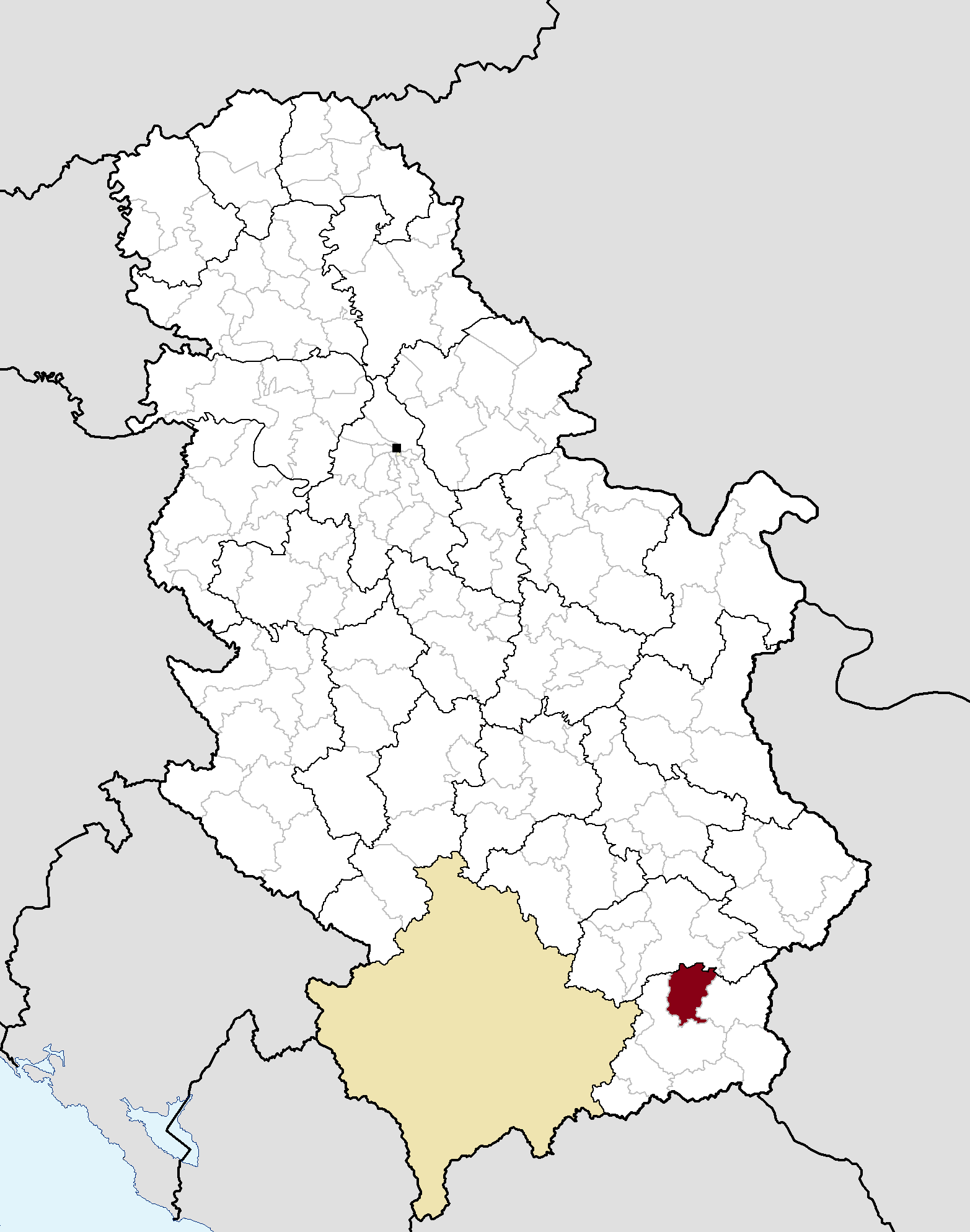
- Location of the municipality of Vladičin Han within Serbia
- Coordinates: 42°42′N 22°04′E
- Country: Serbia
- Region: Southern and Eastern Serbia
- District: Pčinja
- Settlements: 51

Government
  - Mayor: Goran Mladenović (SNS)

Area
  - Town: 4.30 km^{2} (1.66 sq mi)
  - Municipality: 366 km^{2} (141 sq mi)
- Elevation: 386 m (1,266 ft)

Population (2022 census)
  - Town: 7,343
  - Town density: 1,710/km^{2} (4,420/sq mi)
  - Municipality: 17,532
  - Municipality density: 47.9/km^{2} (124/sq mi)
- Time zone: UTC+1 (CET)
  - Summer (DST): UTC+2 (CEST)
- Postal code: 17510
- Area code: +381(0)17
- Car plates: VR
- Website: www.vladicinhan.org.rs

Vladičin Han (Serbian Cyrillic: Владичин Хан, pronounced [ʋlǎdit͡ʃiŋ xâːn]) (Note: Vladičin / Владичин pronounced in isolation: [ʋlǎdit͡ʃin]) is a town and municipality located in the Pčinja District in southern Serbia. The town is located along the road from the Serbian capital Belgrade to the Greek city of Thessaloniki. It is located close to the Serbian border with Bulgaria and North Macedonia. As of 2022, the population of the town was 7,343, while the population of the municipality is 17,532.

== History ==
In the 17th century, a house ("Han") was built by Stefan Grk, which was later bought by Bishop Pajsije of Janjevo. A small settlement was established in 1887 around the house, and was given the name of Vladicin Han. In 1888, the first school was established, and a temple of Saint Nikola was built in 1905. In 1910, an iron bridge was built to replace the old wooden bridges. With the development of railways, it became an established town in the 1920s with flourishing trade and economy.

== Geography ==
The town is located in the Pčinja District in southern Serbia, about 60 km (37 mi) from the Serbian border with Bulgaria and North Macedonia. It is along the road connecting the Serbian capital Belgrade to the Greek city of Thessalonica. The town lies at the mouth of two rivers–Vrla and Kalimanka, which flows into the South Morava. The Vlasina Mountain and Lake are located close to the town.

=== Settlements ===
Aside from the town of Vladičin Han, the municipality includes the following settlements:

- Balinovce
- Bačvište
- Belanovce
- Beliševo
- Bogoševo
- Brestovo
- Dekutince
- Donje Jabukovo
- Dupljane
- Džep
- Garinje
- Gornje Jabukovo
- Gramađe
- Jagnjilo
- Jastrebac
- Jovac
- Kalimance
- Kacapun
- Koznica
- Kopitarce
- Kostomlatica
- Kržince
- Kukavica
- Kunovo
- Lebet
- Lepenica
- Letovište
- Ljutež
- Mazarać
- Manajle
- Manjak
- Mrtvica
- Ostrovica
- Polom
- Prekodolce
- Priboj
- Ravna Reka
- Rdovo
- Repince
- Repište
- Ružić
- Solačka Sena
- Srneći Dol
- Stubal
- Suva Morava
- Tegovište
- Urvič
- Vrbovo
- Zebince
- Žitorađe

== Economy ==
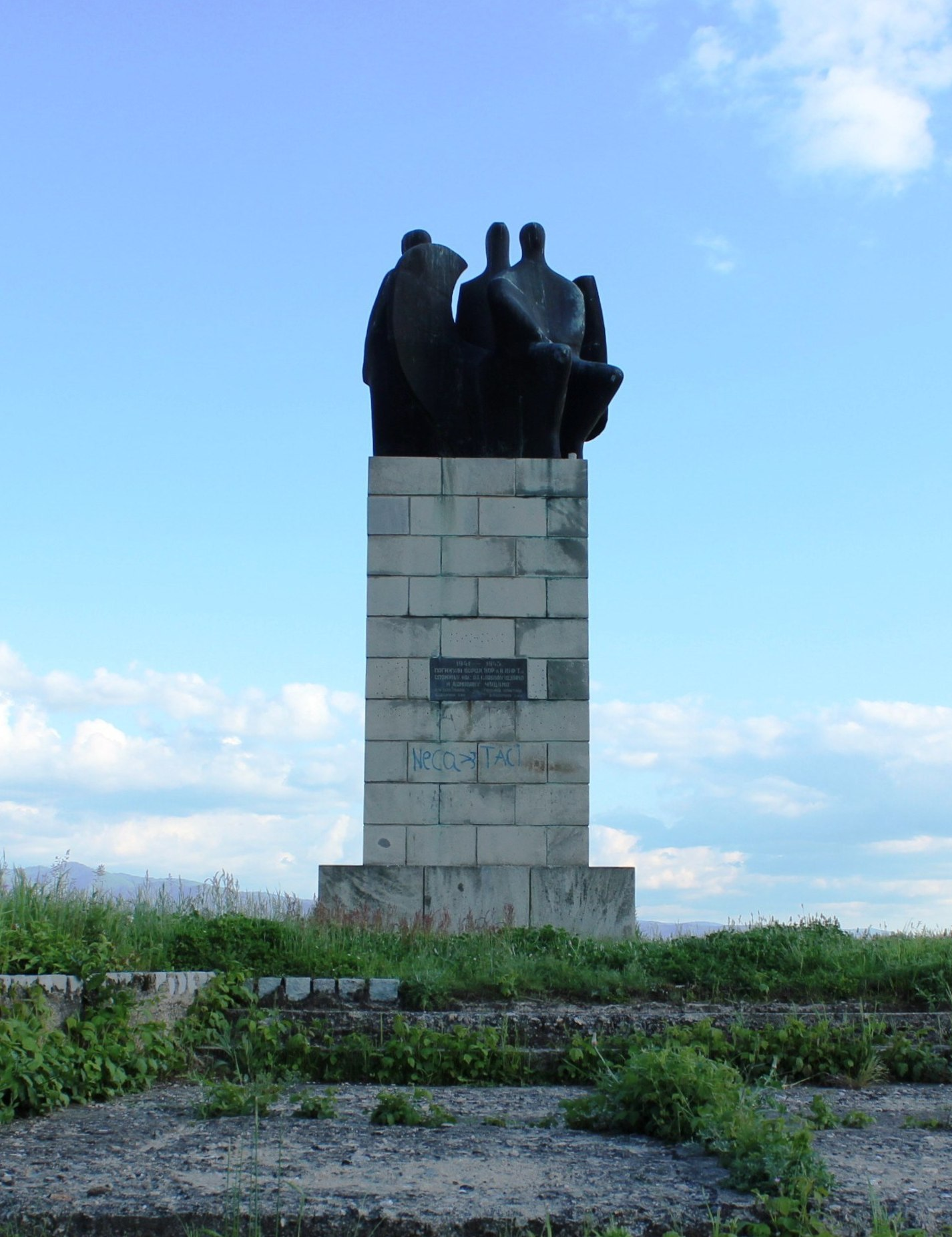
Slabinja Monument in Vlacin Han

The first factory that was established in the town was a brick factory, which is still operational. With the development of transport connectivity, the town saw an influx of people in the early half of the 20th century. Though agriculture was feasible in and around the areas surrounding the town, more people were engaged in manufacturing and trading due to its higher profitability. Trade fairs are common, with the largest fair taking place in September every year. The original market, which was established more than a hundred years ago on the river bed of Kalimaka, still functions as the main market place. Agricultural produce include dairy, fruits, potato, and maize. Between the 1920s and the 1940s, the town was a major center of tobacco production. The town was also popular for its crafts and indigenous works, with a craftsman center functioning since the late 19th century.

As per the data from the Serbian government, the following table gives a preview of the total number of registered people employed in legal entities per their core activity in 2018:

Activity	Total
Agriculture, forestry and fishing	71
Mining and quarrying	-
Manufacturing	1451
Electricity, gas, steam and air conditioning supply	221
Water supply; sewerage, waste management and remediation activities	123
Construction	276
Wholesale and retail trade, repair of motor vehicles and motorcycles	394
Transportation and storage	283
Accommodation and food services	193
Information and communication	14
Financial and insurance activities	18
Real estate activities	-
Professional, scientific and technical activities	89
Administrative and support service activities	59
Public administration and defense; compulsory social security	235
Education	332
Human health and social work activities	179
Arts, entertainment and recreation	43
Other service activities	52
Individual agricultural workers	9
Total	3,844

== Demographics ==
Historical population
Year	Pop.	±% p.a.
1948	24,946	—
1953	25,927	+0.77%
1961	26,074	+0.07%
1971	25,231	−0.33%
1981	25,441	+0.08%
1991	25,225	−0.09%
2002	23,703	−0.56%
2011	20,871	−1.40%
2022	17,532	−1.57%

According to the 2022 census results, the population of the town was 7,343, while the population of the municipality is 17,532. As of 2011, Serbs formed the majority in the municipality with Romani making up a significant minority.

Ethnic group	Population (2011)	%
Serbs	18,644	89.33%
Romani	1,503	7.20%
Bulgarians	88	0.42%
Macedonians	23	0.11%
Russians	10	0.05%
Others	603	2.89%
Total	20,871	100%

== See also ==
- List of places in Serbia
