= Nevestino, Kyustendil Province =

Nevestino Невестино
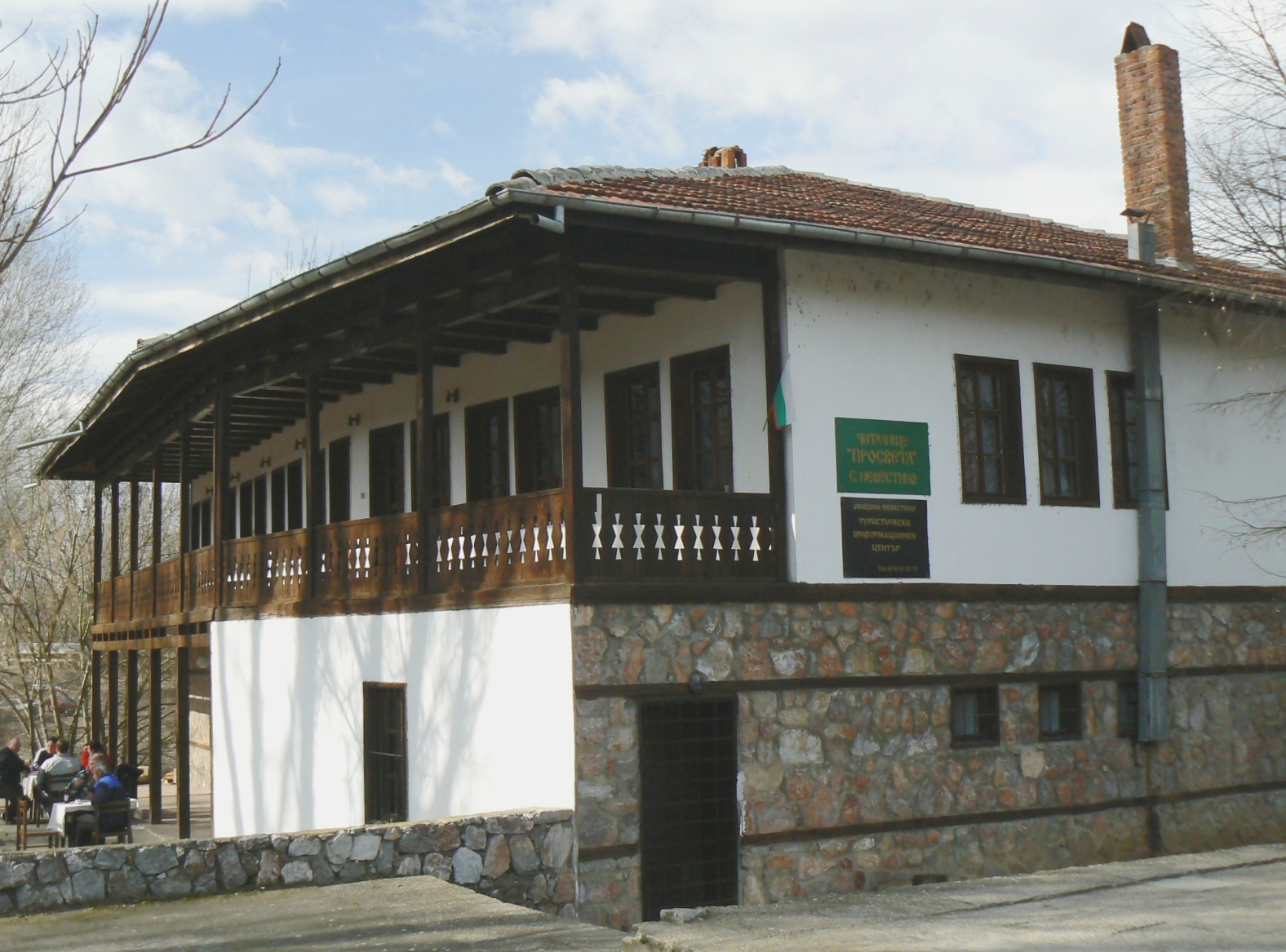
- Nevestino community centre (chitalishte)

- Location of Nevestino
- Coordinates: 42°15′N 22°51′E
- Country: Bulgaria
- Provinces (Oblast): Kyustendil

Government
  - Mayor: Dimitar Stamenkov

Population (2008)
  - Total: 653
- Time zone: UTC+2 (EET)
  - Summer (DST): UTC+3 (EEST)
- Postal Code: 2595
- Area code: 07915

Nevestino (Bulgarian: Невестино, pronounced [nɛˈvɛstino]) is a village in southwestern Bulgaria, part of Kyustendil Province. It is the administrative centre of Nevestino municipality, which lies in the central part of Kyustendil Province.

The village lies 13 kilometres from the provincial capital of Kyustendil, on both banks of the Struma River and near the Kyustendil-Dupnitsa and Kyustendil-Boboshevo-Blagoevgrad roads. Nevestino was first mentioned in 1576 under the name Gospozhino pole (Госпожино поле, "lady's field"); a parallel Ottoman Turkish name was Köprü ("[the] bridge"), referring to the famous bridge Kadin most in the village, which has existed since 1470. Nevestino's name roughly means "the bride's [place, field]", from the word nevesta (невеста), "bride", attested in Old Bulgarian НЄВѢСТА.

== Municipality ==
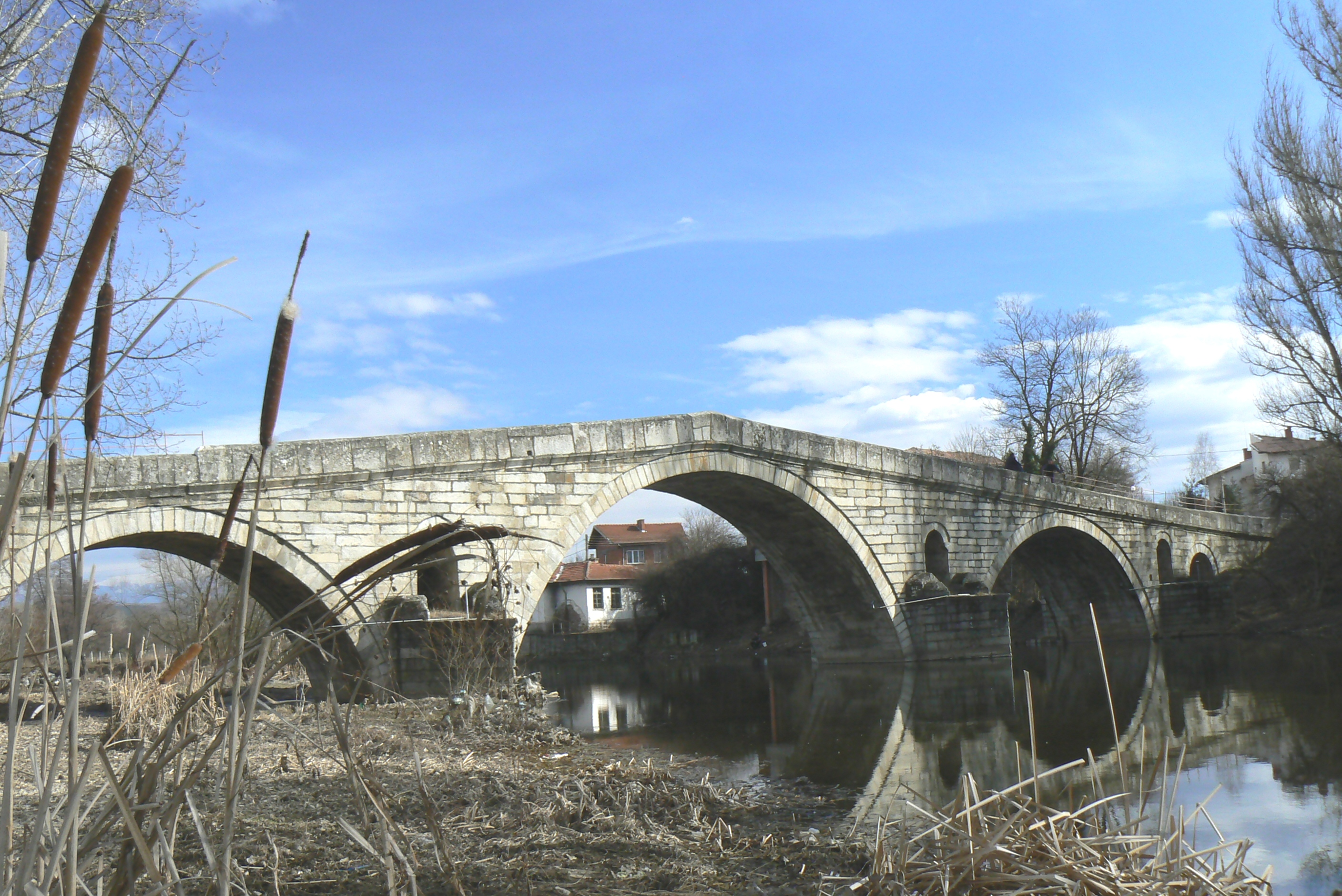
Kadin most in Nevestino

Nevestino municipality has an area of 442 square kilometres and a population of around 3000 people. It includes the following 23 villages:

- Chekanets
- Chetirtsi
- Dlahchevo-Sablyar
- Dolna Koznitsa
- Drumohar
- Eremiya
- Iliya
- Kadrovitsa
- Lilyach
- Marvodol
- Nedelkova Grashtitsa
- Nevestino
- Pastuh
- Pelatikovo
- Rakovo
- Rashka Grashtitsa
- Smolichano
- Stradalovo
- Tishanovo
- Tsarvaritsa
- Vaksevo
- Vetren
- Zgurovo

== Honour ==
Nevestino Cove in Robert Island, South Shetland Islands is named after Nevestino.
