= Treklyano =

Treklyano Трекляно
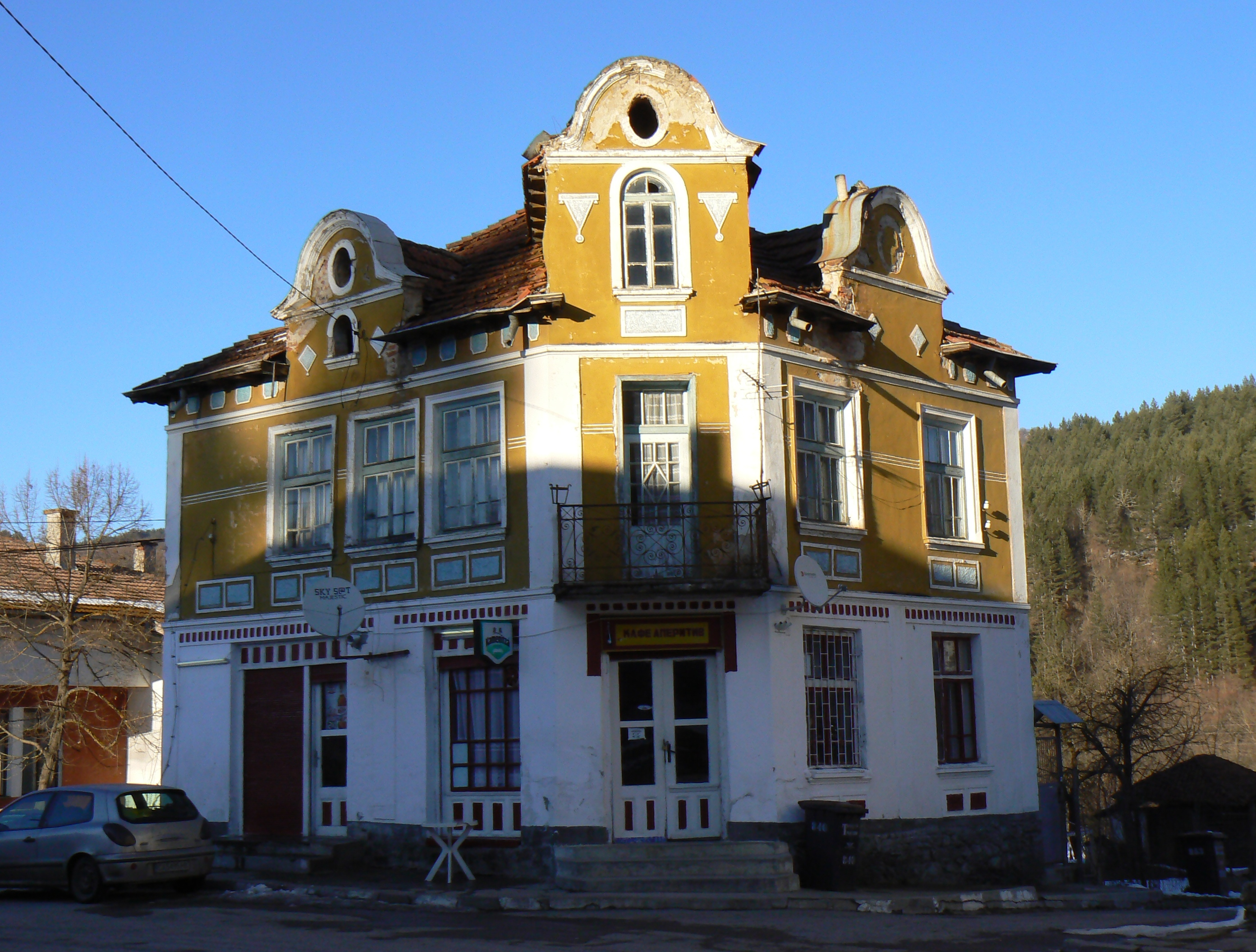
- A café in the village centre

- Location of Treklyano
- Coordinates: 42°33′N 22°35′E
- Country: Bulgaria
- Provinces (Oblast): Kyustendil

Government
  - Mayor: Kamen Arsov
- Elevation: 791 m (2,595 ft)

Population (2008)
  - Total: 321
- Time zone: UTC+2 (EET)
  - Summer (DST): UTC+3 (EEST)
- Postal Code: 2557
- Area code: 07927

Treklyano (Bulgarian: Трекляно, pronounced [ˈtrɛkʎɐno]; also transliterated Trekljano or Trekliano) is a village in southwestern Bulgaria, part of Kyustendil Province. It is the administrative centre of Treklyano Municipality, which lies in the northwestern part of Kyustendil Province. The village is located in the Kraishte area, very close to the Serbian border and not far from the North Macedonia border. It is situated 40 kilometres north of the provincial capital of Kyustendil, 39 kilometres south of Tran and 100 kilometres west of the capital Sofia.

Treklyano lies in an isolated valley at the foot of the 1,733-metre Milevets peak in the border mountain of Milevska Planina. The river Treklyanska reka, which runs through the village, flows into the Struma River at Zemen. The first reference to the village is in an early 15th-century Bulgarian text: ѠТ СЄЛО ТРИКЛИНО. It was also mentioned in Ottoman tax registers of 1570-1572 as Predoshnitsa or Preglino and a few years later, in 1576–1577, it was listed as Terklyane. According to popular etymology, the old village name was Tri Klena ("Three maple trees"), as there was an area near the village where three maple trees were located. Linguists suggest a derivation from *traklo, itself from trak ("tie, belt") or from Greek τρί-κλινος, "three-bedded", referring to stream beds. There is an area near the village where two rivers merge to make up a third one, i.e. forming three beds.

During the Ottoman rule of Bulgaria, the village has been abandoned and reestablished several times. There was an influx of settlers during the First Serbian Uprising of 1804, the Second Serbian Uprising of 1815-1817 and after the newly liberated Principality of Serbia included some then-Bulgarian-populated areas in 1831–1833.

The first school in the village was a monastery school founded in 1853, while a secular school was opened 10 years later. A new Bulgarian Orthodox church dedicated to the Dormition of the Theotokos was built in 1860 at the place of an older church. After the Liberation of Bulgaria, Treklyano grew rapidly: at its peak it had up to 800 houses and a population of around 4,000. A community centre (chitalishte) was established in 1901.

== Municipality ==
Treklyano municipality includes the following 19 places:

- Bazovitsa
- Brest
- Cheshlyantsi
- Dobri Dol
- Dolni Koriten
- Dolno Kobile (locally Dolno Kobilye)
- Dragoychintsi
- Gabreshevtsi
- Gorni Koriten
- Gorno Kobile (locally Gorno Kobilye)
- Kiselitsa
- Kosovo
- Metohiya
- Pobit Kamak (locally Pobiyen Kamik)
- Sredorek
- Sushitsa
- Treklyano
- Ushi
- Zlogosh

In the municipality, 1,111 people were registered in 2007, in the town there was 370 people.

== Honour ==
Treklyano Island off Robert Island, South Shetland Islands is named after Treklyano.
