= Bobov Dol =

Bobov Dol Бобов дол
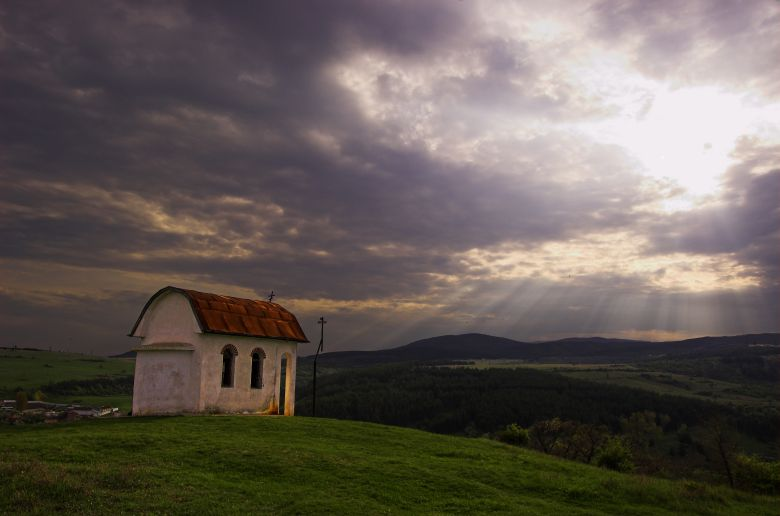
- Orthodox chapel near Bobov Dol

- Location of Bobov Dol
- Coordinates: 42°22′N 23°01′E
- Country: Bulgaria
- Provinces (Oblast): Kyustendil
- First mentioned: 1576

Government
  - Mayor: Yordanka Kalenichkova
- Elevation: 694 m (2,277 ft)

Population (2004-12-15)
  - Total: 6,969
- Time zone: UTC+2 (EET)
  - Summer (DST): UTC+3 (EEST)
- Postal Code: 2670
- Area code: 0702
- License plate: KH

Bobov Dol (Bulgarian: Бобов дол [ˈbɔbovˌdɔɫ]; also Bobovdol) is a town in Bobov Dol Municipality, Kyustendil Province, southwestern Bulgaria. Bobov Dol lies near the geographic centre of the Balkan Peninsula and is known for its coal mines and thermal power plant. The third-largest town in the province (after Kyustendil and Dupnitsa), it is the administrative centre of Bobov Dol municipality.

Located in a mountainous region, it is surrounded on three sides by the mountain Konyavska Planina, with the Gologlavski Rid ridge to the north and east and the volcano-resembling peak of Kolosh to the west. To the south is the Razmetanitsa plain which reaches the valley of the Struma River. The town's name (literally "bean valley") may allude to the bean-shaped valley where the original village, now the Hristo Botev neighbourhood, is located; the name was first mentioned in 1576. To the east is the other town part of Bobov Dol, the newer Minyor neighbourhood in the Bankovitsa area which dates to 1954 and mostly consists of tower blocks.

Bobov Dol was first mentioned in an Ottoman tax register of 1576, although the area had been inhabited by the Thracians in antiquity and was part of the medieval Bulgarian Empire, as well as the Byzantine Empire. Although in the 1830s the geologist Ami Boué visited the region and studied the local coal deposits, it was not until after the Liberation of Bulgaria that extraction began, namely in 1891. On 30 September 1967, the village of Bobov Dol was proclaimed a town. The Bobov Dol Thermal Power Plant was built between 1973 and 1975, 10 kilometres from the town, at the village of Golemo Selo. During the Socialist era, Bobov Dol attracted many workers as it experienced an economic and demographic boom, with groups of workers arriving from as far as Nicaragua in the 1980s.

Notable natives include football manager Georgi Vasilev (born 1946) and Prime Minister Plamen Oresharski (born 1960). The local football club, PFC Minyor Bobov dol, plays in the second division of Bulgarian football, B PFG.

== Municipality ==
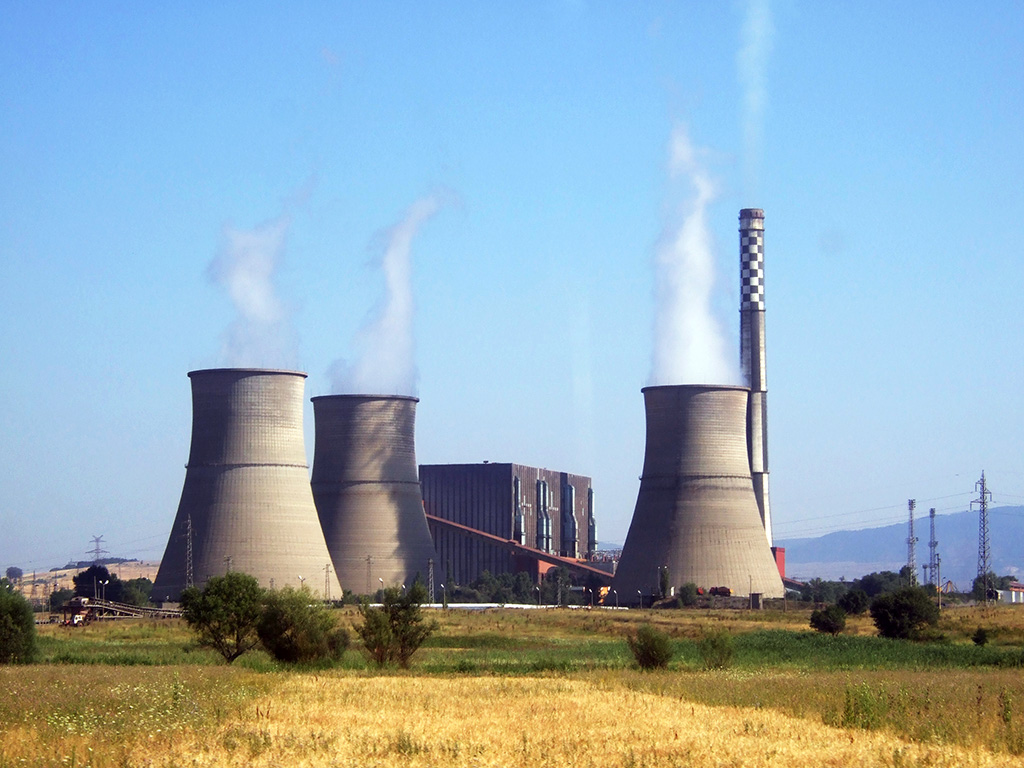
Bobov Dol Power Plant.

Bobov Dol is the administrative centre of Bobov Dol municipality (part of Kyustendil Province), which includes the following 18 places:

- Babino
- Babinska Reka
- Blato
- Bobov Dol
- Dolistovo
- Golema Fucha
- Golemo Selo
- Golyam Varbovnik
- Gorna Koznitsa
- Korkina
- Lokvata
- Mala Fucha
- Malo Selo
- Mali Varbovnik
- Mlamolovo
- Novoselyane
- Panicharevo
- Shatrovo
