= Eleshnitsa (Struma) =

- Location within Bulgaria
- Native name: Елешница (Bulgarian)

Physical characteristics
- Source: 400 meters SW of Ruen
  - location: Osogovo
  - coordinates: 42.1533°N 22.5133°E
  - elevation: 2173 meters
- Mouth
  - location: Struma→ Aegean Sea
  - coordinates: 42.2475°N 22.8892°E

Eleshnitsa (Bulgarian: Елешница) is a river located in western Bulgaria, in Kyustendil Province. It passes through Kyustendil Municipality and Nevestino. It is a right tributary of the river Struma. Eleshnitsa is 59 km long, which makes her the 66th in length among the rivers in Bulgaria.

It serves as a natural drain to the eastern and southern parts of Osogovska planina. It is the fourth largest tributary of the Struma, along with the Strumeshnitsa, Angitis and Dragovishtitsa.

== Geography ==
The Eleshnitsa springs at an altitude of 2,173 m above sea level from the Osogovo mountain range, 400 meters southwest of the peak Ruen (2,251 m), the highest summit of the mountain range.

In its entirety, the river flows in a deep, weakly afforested valley. In its first 17 kilometers of riverbank, it flows parallel to the border with North Macedonia. Thereafter, it takes a turn northeast until Vaksevo village, then it turns north, and after Chetirtsi village takes a sharp turn east, and after 2 kilometers flows into the Struma at 437 meters above sea level. The river often floods during its peak water levels.

The river basin has a total area of 358 km^{2} which is 2,07% of Struma's basin.

Fish species can be met like Salmo macedonicus, Squalius orpheus, Phoxinus phoxinus, Alburnoides strumicae, Alburnus alburnus, Chondrostoma vardarense, Gobio bulgaricus, Barbus Cyclolepis, Barbatula bureschi, Cobitis strumicae.

Eleshnitsa river receives the majority of its water due to rain-snow feeding and reaches its maximum during April. The minimum amount of water in the river is reached in August. Eleshnitsa is the most turbid river in Bulgaria.

== Settlements along Eleshnitsa ==
The river flows entirely in Kyustendil Province. Along its course there are seven villages — Sazhdenik in Kyustendil Municipality and Chekanets, Rakovo, Stradalovo, Vaksevo, Drumohar and Chetiritsi in Nevestino Municipality.
