= Shatrovo =

Shatrovo may refer to:

- Shatrovo, Bulgaria, a village in the Municipality of Bobov Dol, Kyustendil Province, Bulgaria
- Shatrovo, Russia, name of several rural localities in Russia
