= Chekanets =

Chekanets Чеканец
- Village
- Location within Bulgaria
- Coordinates: 42.1097°N 22.6289°E
- Country: Bulgaria
- Province: Kyustendil Province
- Municipality: Nevestino
- Time zone: UTC+2 (EET)
  - Summer (DST): UTC+3 (EEST)

Chekanets is a village in Nevestino Municipality, Kyustendil Province, south-western Bulgaria.

== Geography ==
The village of Chekanets is located in a mountainous region known as Piyanets. It is situated on the southern slopes of the Osogovo Mountain, along the upper course of the Eleshnitsa River. It lies 40 km from the village of Nevestino.
