= Bobov =

Bobov may refer to

- Bobov (Hasidic dynasty), a Hasidic community from southern Poland and now headquartered in the neighborhood of Borough Park, in Brooklyn, New York, United States
- Bobov Synagogue (Kraków) in Poland
- Bobov Dol, a town in Bulgaria
  - Bobov Dol Power Plant
  - Bobov Dol Municipality
