= Blato =

Blato, derived from Proto-Slavic *bolto 'mud; swamp, marsh', may refer to the following places:

== Bosnia and Herzegovina ==
- Hutovo Blato
- Mostarsko Blato
- Blato (župa), a former region of the medieval Bosnian state, covering the territory of present-day Mostarsko Blato

== Bulgaria ==
- Blato, Bulgaria, a village near Nevestino, Kyustendil Province
- Blato River, a river in western Bulgaria, a left tributary of the Iskar

== Croatia ==
- Blato, Korčula, a municipality on the island Korčula
- Blato, Mljet, a village on the island Mljet
- Blato, Zagreb, a neighborhood in Novi Zagreb
- Blato na Cetini, a place in the Split-Dalmatia County
- Veliko Blato (Croatia), a wetland on the island of Pag

== Czech Republic ==
- Blato, a village and part of Mikulovice (Pardubice District) in the Pardubice Region
- Blato, a village and part of Nová Bystřice in the South Bohemian Region

== Serbia ==
- Blato (Pirot)
- Blato (Sjenica)
- Veliko Blato (Serbia), a lake near the Danube north of Belgrade

== Slovenia ==
- Blato, Slovenske Konjice, a settlement in northeastern Slovenia
- Blato, Trebnje, a settlement in southeastern Slovenia
- Gorenje Blato, a settlement in central Slovenia
- Spodnje Blato, a settlement in central Slovenia
