= Malo Selo =

Malo Selo (lit. 'small village') may refer to the following places:

- Malo Selo, Glamoč, a village in Bosnia and Herzegovina
- Malo Selo, Bulgaria, a village near Bobov Dol
- Malo Selo, Croatia, a village near Delnice
