= Shatrovo, Russia =

Shatrovo (Russian: Шатрово) is the name of several rural localities in Russia:

- Shatrovo, Kurgan Oblast, a selo in Shatrovsky Selsoviet of Shatrovsky District of Kurgan Oblast
- Shatrovo, Vologda Oblast, a village in Yudinsky Selsoviet of Velikoustyugsky District of Vologda Oblast
