= Chetirtsi =

Chetirtsi Четирц
- Village
- Location within Bulgaria
- Coordinates: 42.2406°N 22.8808°E
- Country: Bulgaria
- Province: Kyustendil Province
- Municipality: Nevestino
- Time zone: UTC+2 (EET)
  - Summer (DST): UTC+3 (EEST)

Chetirtsi is a village in Nevestino Municipality, Kyustendil Province, south-western Bulgaria.

== Geography ==
The village of Chetirtsi is located in the southwestern part of the Eleshnitsa River valley, one and a half kilometers from its confluence with the Struma River. The highest point in the village’s territory is located in the Korilovo area—Beloto Kamen Peak, at an elevation of 683 meters—while the village’s average elevation, measured near the Eleshnitsa River, is 525 meters. The village is situated, near the Struma motorway. Part of the village’s land extends along the course of the Struma River. Another part lies along its tributary, the Eleshnitsa River. The distance to the town of Nevestino is 3 km.
