= Zlatan Stoykov =

Bulgarian general

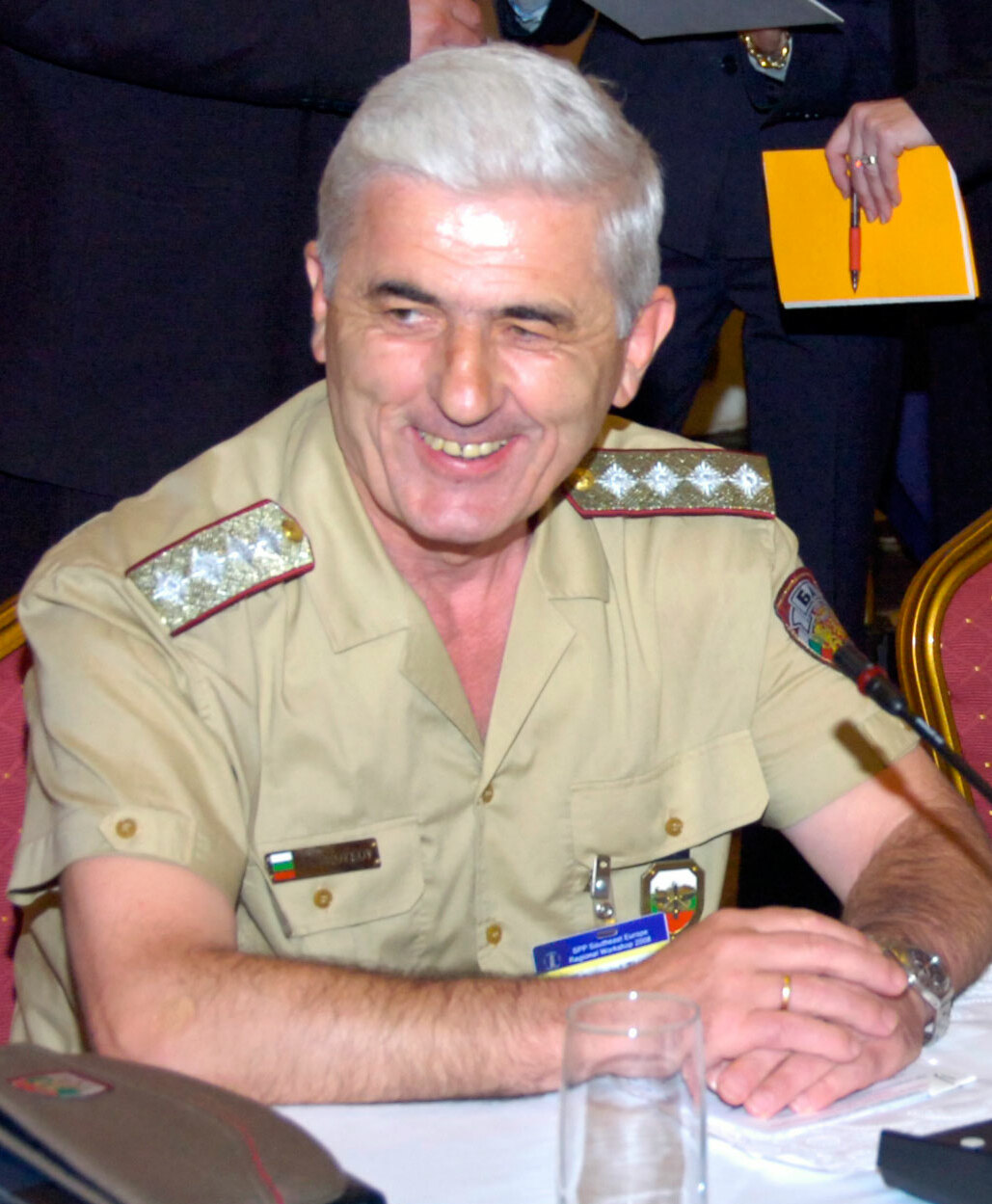
Gen. Zlatan Stoykov

Zlatan Kirilov Stoykov (Bulgarian: Златан Кирилов Стойков; born 17 March 1951) is a Bulgarian general and was from 1 June 2006 to 30 June 2009 the 44th Chief of the General Staff of the Bulgarian Armed Forces.

Lieutenant General Stoykov was born in Tsarvaritsa, Nevestino municipality, Kyustendil Province on 17 March 1951. He finished the Technical College of Electrical Industry in Kyustendil and graduated from the Vasil Levski Military All-Army University in Veliko Tarnovo. He has also earned degrees from the Rakovski Defence and Staff College in Sofia and the General Staff College in Moscow, Russia. In 1999, Stoykov studied English as a second language at the Defense Language Institute in San Antonio, Texas, United States.
