= Mikulovice =

Mikulovice may refer to places in the Czech Republic:

- Mikulovice (Jeseník District), a municipality and village in the Olomouc Region
- Mikulovice (Pardubice District), a municipality and village in the Pardubice Region
- Mikulovice (Třebíč District), a municipality and village in the Vysočina Region
- Mikulovice (Znojmo District), a market town in the South Moravian Region
- Mikulovice, a village and part of Klášterec nad Ohří in the Ústí nad Labem Region
- Mikulovice, a village and part of Nová Ves v Horách in the Ústí nad Labem Region
