= Rakovo =

Rakovo refers to the following places:

- Rakovo, Slovakia, a village
- Rakovo, Kyustendil Province, a village in Bulgaria
- Rakovo, Sliven Province, a village in Bulgaria
- Rakovo, Macedonia, a locality
