= Zgurovo =

Zgurovo Згурово
- Village
- Location within Bulgaria
- Coordinates: 42.2219°N 22.7817°E
- Country: Bulgaria
- Province: Kyustendil Province
- Municipality: Nevestino
- Time zone: UTC+2 (EET)
  - Summer (DST): UTC+3 (EEST)

Zgurovo is a village in Nevestino Municipality, Kyustendil Province, south-western Bulgaria.
