= Dolni Koriten =

Dolni Koriten Долни Коритен
- Village
- Location within Bulgaria
- Coordinates: 42.4750°N 22.5706°E
- Country: Bulgaria
- Province: Kyustendil Province
- Municipality: Treklyano
- Time zone: UTC+2 (EET)
  - Summer (DST): UTC+3 (EEST)

Dolni Koriten is a village in Treklyano Municipality, Kyustendil Province, south-western Bulgaria.
