= Gorno Kobile =

Gorno Kobile Горно Кобиле
- Village
- Location within Bulgaria
- Coordinates: 42.5667°N 22.5167°E
- Country: Bulgaria
- Province: Kyustendil Province
- Municipality: Treklyano
- Time zone: UTC+2 (EET)
  - Summer (DST): UTC+3 (EEST)

Gorno Kobile is a village in Treklyano Municipality, Kyustendil Province, south-western Bulgaria. As of 2011 the village has only four inhabitants (all of them are aged seventy and older years old). This number is down from nine inhabitants in 2008 and further down from 106 in 1934. It will most likely become a ghost village within a few years.
