= Mlamolovo =

Mlamolovo Мламолово
- Village
- Location within Bulgaria
- Coordinates: 42.3333°N 23.0167°E
- Country: Bulgaria
- Province: Kyustendil Province
- Municipality: Bobov Dol
- Time zone: UTC+2 (EET)
  - Summer (DST): UTC+3 (EEST)

Mlamolovo is a village in Bobov Dol Municipality, Kyustendil Province, south-western Bulgaria. It is located roughly 2.81 KM from the nearest village of Bobov Dol.
