= Vetren =

Vetren may refer to:

- In Bulgaria (the name is written Ветрен):
  - Vetren, Pazardzhik Province - a town in the Septemvri municipality, Pazardzhik Province
  - Vetren, Burgas Province - a village in the Burgas municipality, Burgas Province
  - Vetren, Kyustendil Province - a village in the Nevestino municipality, Kyustendil Province
  - Vetren, Silistra Province - a village in the Silistra municipality, Silistra Province
  - Vetren, Stara Zagora Province - a village in the Maglizh municipality, Stara Zagora Province
- In North Macedonia (the name is written Ветрен):
  - Vetren, North Macedonia - a village in the Delčevo municipality
- In Greece (the name was written Βέτρινα or Βέτρέν):
  - Neo Petritsi (until 1927 Vetrina or Vetren) - a village in the Sintiki municipality in the Serres (regional unit)
