= Nedelkova Grashtitsa =

Nedelkova Grashtitsa Неделкова Гращица
- Village
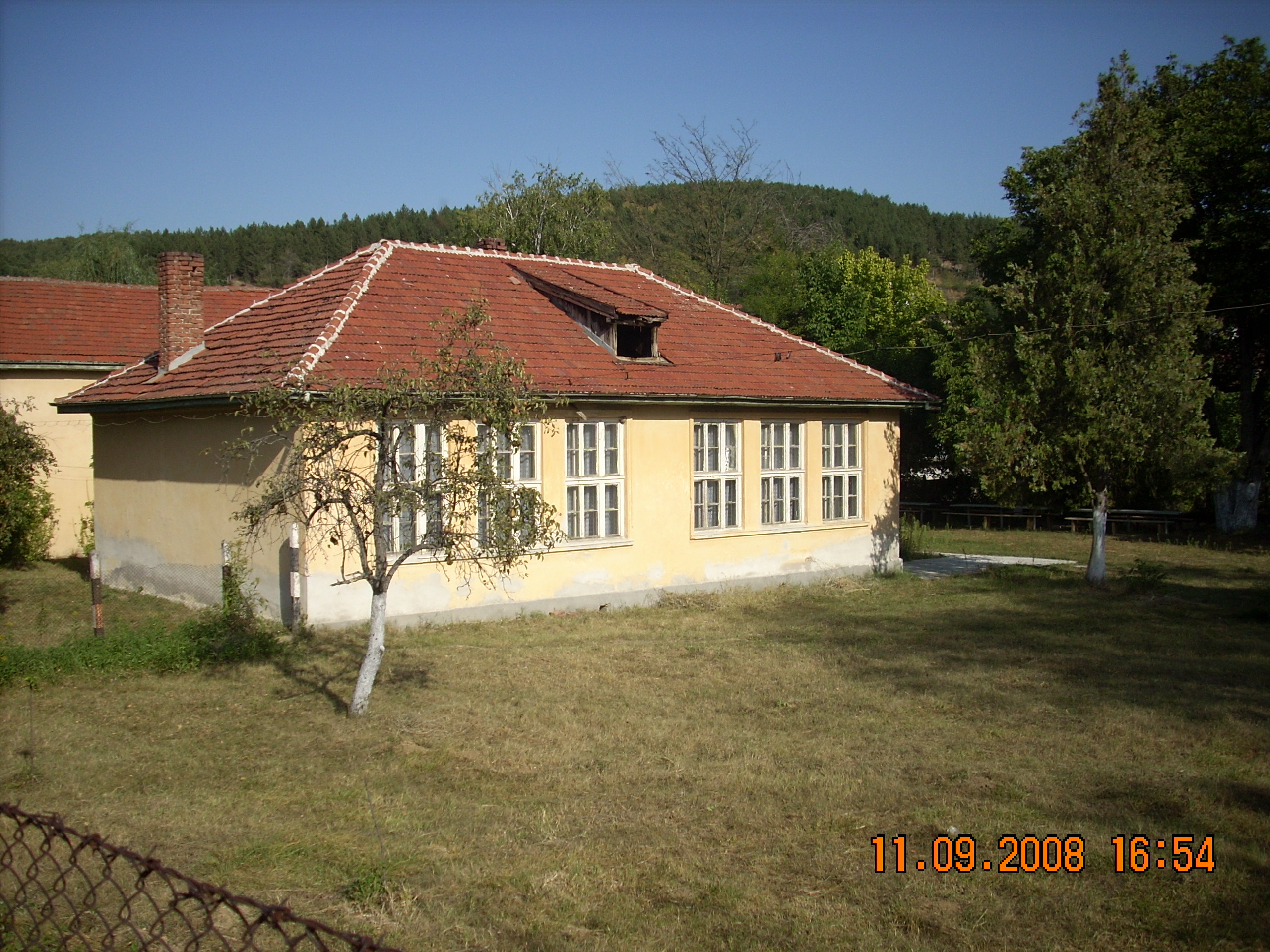
- Former school in Nedelkova Grashtitsa

- Location within Bulgaria
- Coordinates: 42.2367°N 22.8042°E
- Country: Bulgaria
- Province: Kyustendil Province
- Municipality: Nevestino
- Time zone: UTC+2 (EET)
  - Summer (DST): UTC+3 (EEST)

Nedelkova Grashtitsa is a village in Nevestino Municipality, Kyustendil Province, south-western Bulgaria.
