= Rashka Grashtitsa =

Rashka Grashtitsa Рашка Гращица
- Village
- Location within Bulgaria
- Coordinates: 42.2067°N 22.7783°E
- Country: Bulgaria
- Province: Kyustendil Province
- Municipality: Nevestino
- Time zone: UTC+2 (EET)
  - Summer (DST): UTC+3 (EEST)

Rashka Grashtitsa is a village in Nevestino Municipality, Kyustendil Province, south-western Bulgaria.

- Region: South-Western planning region of Bulgaria
- District: Kyustendil district
- Municipality: Nevestino municipality
- Latitude: 42.2069435
- Longitude: 22.7786102
- Altitude: 500–699 m
- Distance by air to the capital city Sofia: 69 km
- Area: 11.9 km^{2}
- Population: 147 people (31 December 2013)
- Postal code: 2578
- Phone code: 07913
