= Pobit Kamak =

Pobit Kamak refers to the following places in Bulgaria:

- Pobit Kamak, Kyustendil Province
- Pobit Kamak, Pazardzhik Province
- Pobit Kamak, Razgrad Province
