= Pastuh =

Pastuh Пастух
- Village
- Location within Bulgaria
- Coordinates: 42.2031°N 22.9028°E
- Country: Bulgaria
- Province: Kyustendil Province
- Municipality: Nevestino
- Time zone: UTC+2 (EET)
  - Summer (DST): UTC+3 (EEST)

Pastuh is a village in Nevestino Municipality, Kyustendil Province, south-western Bulgaria.
