= Kiselitsa =

Kiselitsa Киселица
- Village
- Location within Bulgaria
- Coordinates: 42.5483°N 22.5103°E
- Country: Bulgaria
- Province: Kyustendil Province
- Municipality: Treklyano
- Time zone: UTC+2 (EET)
  - Summer (DST): UTC+3 (EEST)

Kiselitsa is a village in Treklyano Municipality, Kyustendil Province, south-western Bulgaria.
