= Brest, Kyustendil Province =

Brest Брест
- Village
- Location within Bulgaria
- Coordinates: 42.4642°N 22.6022°E
- Country: Bulgaria
- Province: Kyustendil Province
- Municipality: Treklyano
- Time zone: UTC+2 (EET)
  - Summer (DST): UTC+3 (EEST)

Brest (Bulgarian: Брест) is a village in Treklyano Municipality, Kyustendil Province, south-western Bulgaria. In 2011, the village had only one inhabitant who was eighty-three years old, down from two inhabitants in 2008 and further down from 97 people in 1956. It is most likely a ghost village, with no population.
