= Dvortsy =

Dvortsy (Russian: Дворцы) is the name of several rural localities in Russia:

- Dvortsy, Kaluga Oblast, a selo in Dzerzhinsky District of Kaluga Oblast
- Dvortsy, Kurgan Oblast, a village in Shatrovsky Selsoviet of Shatrovsky District of Kurgan Oblast
- Dvortsy, Bezhanitsky District, Pskov Oblast, a village in Bezhanitsky District, Pskov Oblast
- Dvortsy, Pskovsky District, Pskov Oblast, a village in Pskovsky District, Pskov Oblast
- Dvortsy, Tver Oblast, a village in Staritsky District of Tver Oblast
