= Tsarvaritsa =

- Village
- Location in Bulgaria
- Coordinates: 42°04′18″N 22°50′29″E
- Country: Bulgaria
- Province: Kyustendil Province
- Municipality: Nevestino

Area
  - Total: 15.883 sq mi (41.137 km^{2})

Population (2007)
  - Total: 84
- Time zone: UTC+2 (EET)

Tsarvaritsa or Tsurvaritsa (Bulgarian: Село Църварица) is a village in the municipality of Nevestino, located in the Kyustendil Province of western Bulgaria. The village, in a mountainous region near the border with North Macedonia, covers an area of 41.137 square kilometres (15.883 sq mi) and is located 78.4 kilometres (48.7 mi) from Sofia. As of 2007, the village had a population of 84 people.

== Notable people ==
- Zlatan Stoykov (born 1951), military figure
