= Kadin most =

Stone arch bridge in Kyustendil Province, Bulgaria

Coordinates: 42°15′22″N 22°51′13″E

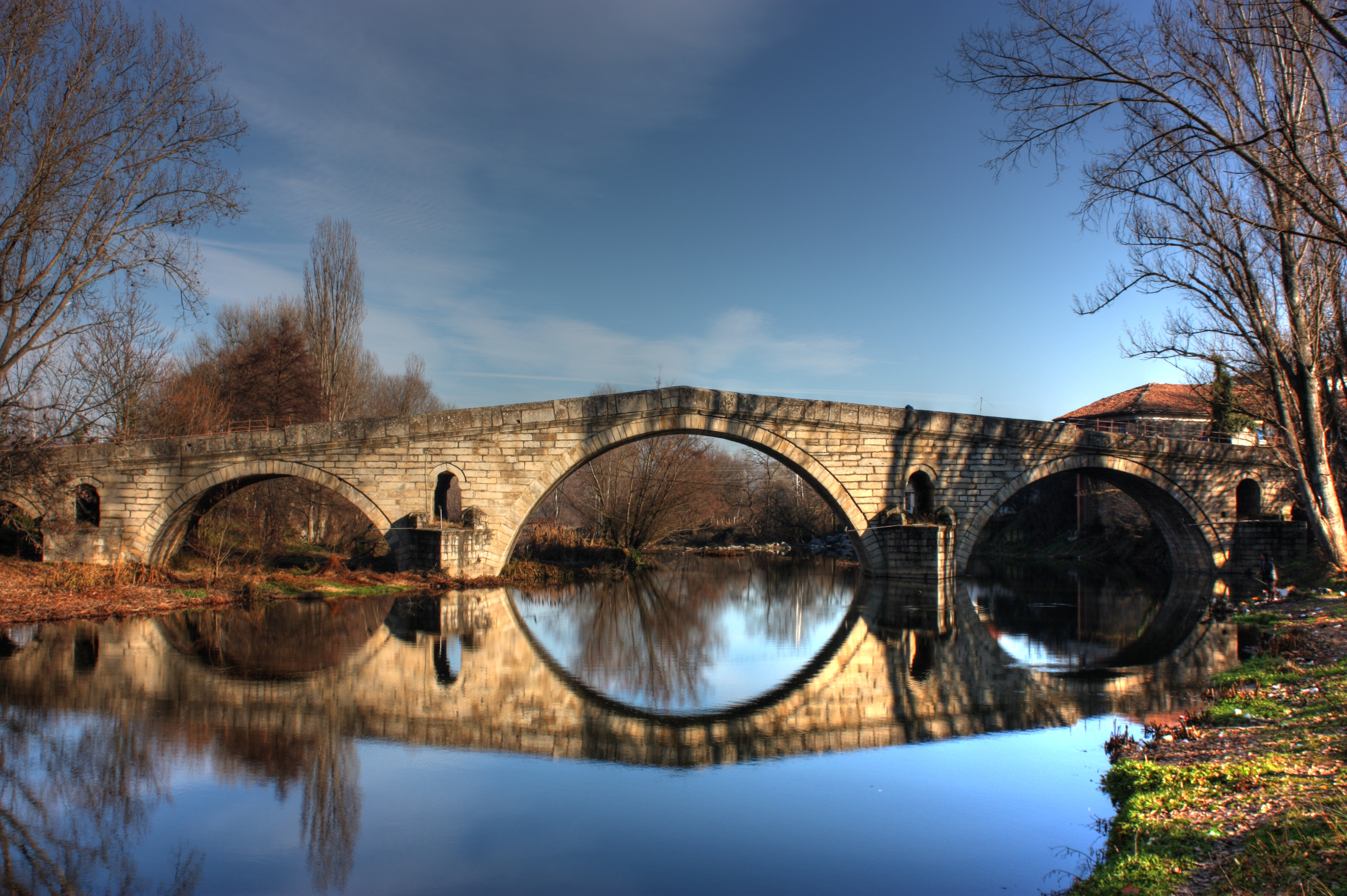
Kadin most

The Kadin most (Bulgarian: Кадин мост, "bridge of the qadi") or Nevestin most (Невестин мост, "Nevestino bridge") is a 15th-century stone arch bridge over the Struma River at Nevestino, Kyustendil Province, in southwestern Bulgaria. It was constructed in 1470 on the order of Ishak Pasha during the reign of Ottoman sultan Mehmed II, as evidenced by the Ottoman Turkish stone inscription on one of the sides. The bridge has three arches, its longest span is 20 metres (66 ft) and the total length is 100 metres (330 ft).
