= Iliya =

Iliya Илия
- Village
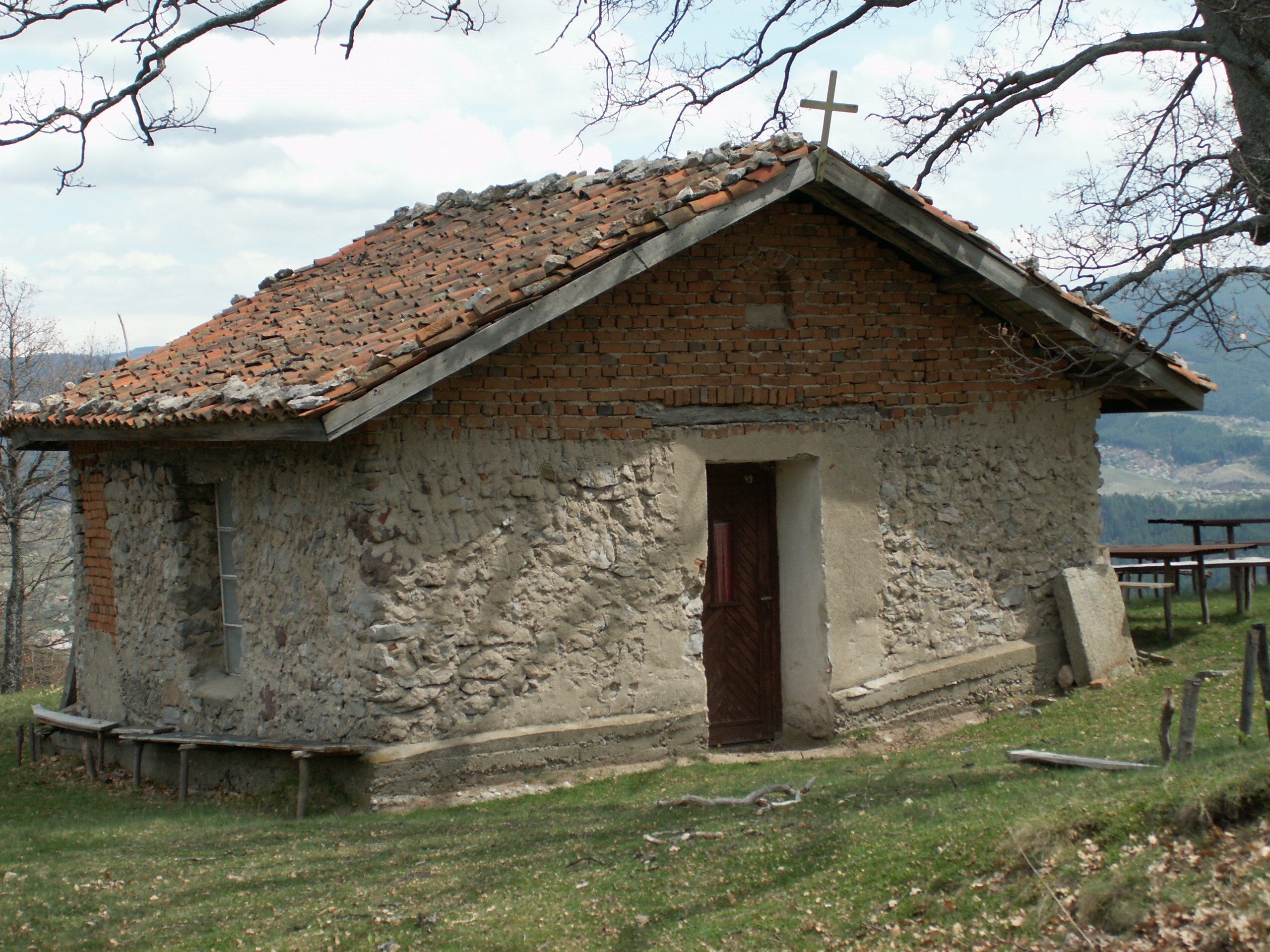
- Saint Iliya Chapel in Iliya, Bulgaria

- Location within Bulgaria
- Coordinates: 42.0714°N 22.7928°E
- Country: Bulgaria
- Province: Kyustendil Province
- Municipality: Nevestino
- Time zone: UTC+2 (EET)
  - Summer (DST): UTC+3 (EEST)

Iliya is a village in Nevestino Municipality, Kyustendil Province, south-western Bulgaria.
