= Bazovitsa =

Bazovitsa Бъзовица
- Village
- Location within Bulgaria
- Coordinates: 42.5983°N 22.5444°E
- Country: Bulgaria
- Province: Kyustendil Province
- Municipality: Treklyano
- Time zone: UTC+2 (EET)
  - Summer (DST): UTC+3 (EEST)

Bazovitsa is a village in Treklyano Municipality, Kyustendil Province, south-western Bulgaria.
