= Kosovo, Kyustendil Province =

Village in Treklyano municipality, Kyustendil Province, Bulgaria

Kosovo (Bulgarian: Косово) is a village in Treklyano municipality, Kyustendil Province, Bulgaria, located at 42°35′40″N 22°34′49″E. The village is in a mountainous area, five kilometers away from the border of Serbia.

Kosovo was first mentioned in 1576 as Kosova. The name is derived from the Bulgarian word for blackbird, kos (кос). There is a legend that the village was founded by Bulgarian refugees from the region of Kosovo, which is also likely.
