= Dolno Kobile =

Dolno Kobile Долно Кобиле
- Village
- Location within Bulgaria
- Coordinates: 42.5500°N 22.5320°E
- Country: Bulgaria
- Province: Kyustendil Province
- Municipality: Treklyano
- Time zone: UTC+2 (EET)
  - Summer (DST): UTC+3 (EEST)

Dolno Kobile is a village in Treklyano Municipality, Kyustendil Province, south-western Bulgaria.
