= Bobov Dol Municipality =

Bobov Dol Municipality Община Бобов дол
- Municipality
- Location within Bulgaria
- Coordinates: 42°22′N 23°1′E
- Country: Bulgaria
- Province: Kyustendil
- Municipality: Bobov Dol

Area
  - Total: 206.19 km^{2} (79.61 sq mi)

Population (1-Feb-2011)
  - Total: 9,067
  - Density: 43.97/km^{2} (113.9/sq mi)
- Time zone: UTC+2 (EET)
  - Summer (DST): UTC+3 (EEST)
- Website: www.bobovdol.eu

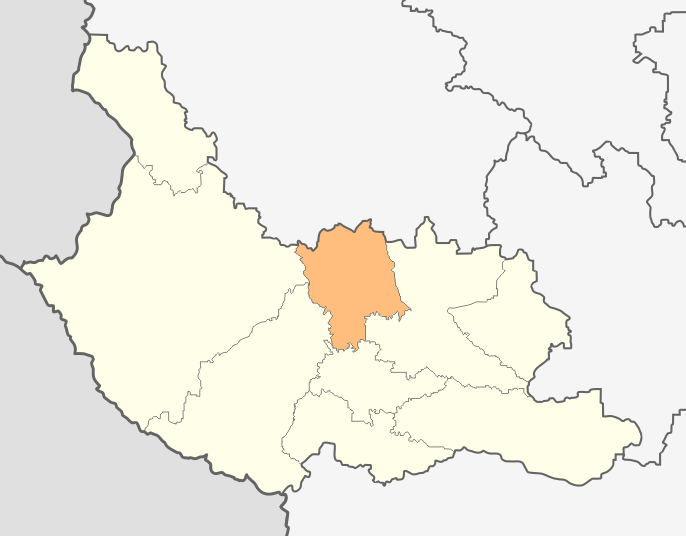
Bobov Dol municipality within Kyustendil Province

Bobov Dol Municipality is a municipality in Kyustendil Province, Bulgaria. The administrative centre is Bobov Dol.

== Demography ==
=== Religion ===
According to the latest Bulgarian census of 2011, the religious composition, among those who answered the optional question on religious identification, was the following:

Religious composition of Bobov Dol Municipality
Orthodox Christianity	90.1%
Catholicism	0.2%
Protestantism	0.4%
Islam	0.0%
No religion	4.0%
Prefer not to answer, others and indefinable	5.3%

== Villages ==
In addition to the capital town of Bobov Dol, there are 17 villages in the municipality.

- Babino
- Babinska Reka
- Blato
- Dolistovo
- Golema Fucha
- Golemo Selo
- Golyam Varbovnik
- Gorna Koznitsa
- Korkina
- Lokvata
- Mala Fucha
- Malo Selo
- Mali Varbovnik
- Mlamolovo
- Novoselyane
- Panicharevo
- Shatrovo
