= Bobov Dol Power Plant =

Coal-fired power plant in Bulgaria

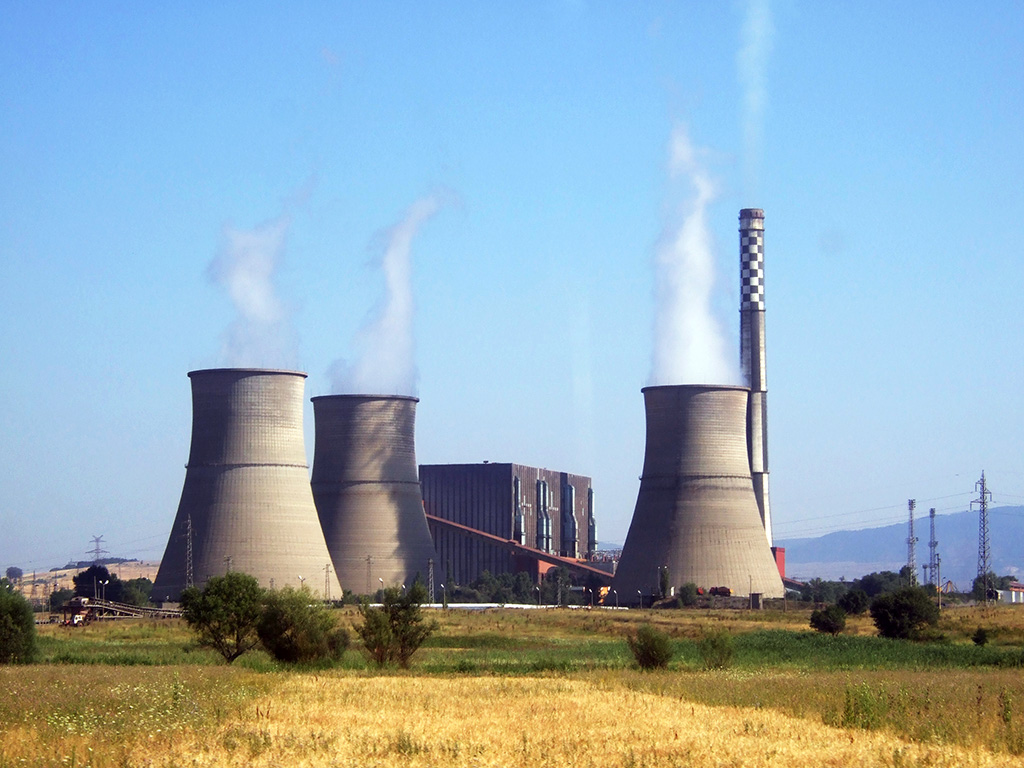
- Official name: ТЕЦ Бобов Дол
- Country: Bulgaria
- Location: Bobov Dol
- Coordinates: 42°17′8″N 23°1′58″E
- Status: Operational
- Commission date: 1973
- Owner: Consortium Energy JSC (Hristo Kovachki)

Thermal power station
- Primary fuel: Coal

Power generation
- Units operational: 2
- Nameplate capacity: 630 MW

External links
- Website: tecbd.com
- Commons: Related media on Commons

Bobov Dol is a coal-fired power plant which generates electricity in Bulgaria, situated in the lands of the village Golemo Selo near the town of Bobov Dol, Kyustendil Province.

The plant is located near the Bobov Dol coal mines and has an installed capacity of 630 MW. One of the investors proposed to add 2 new turbines to the 3 existing one with 210 MW each so that Bobov Dol TPP could reach 1,000 MW, but this was not done.

Its chimney is 200 metres tall . It pollutes.

== See also ==
- Maritsa Iztok Complex
