= Babino, Bulgaria =

Babino Бабино
- Village
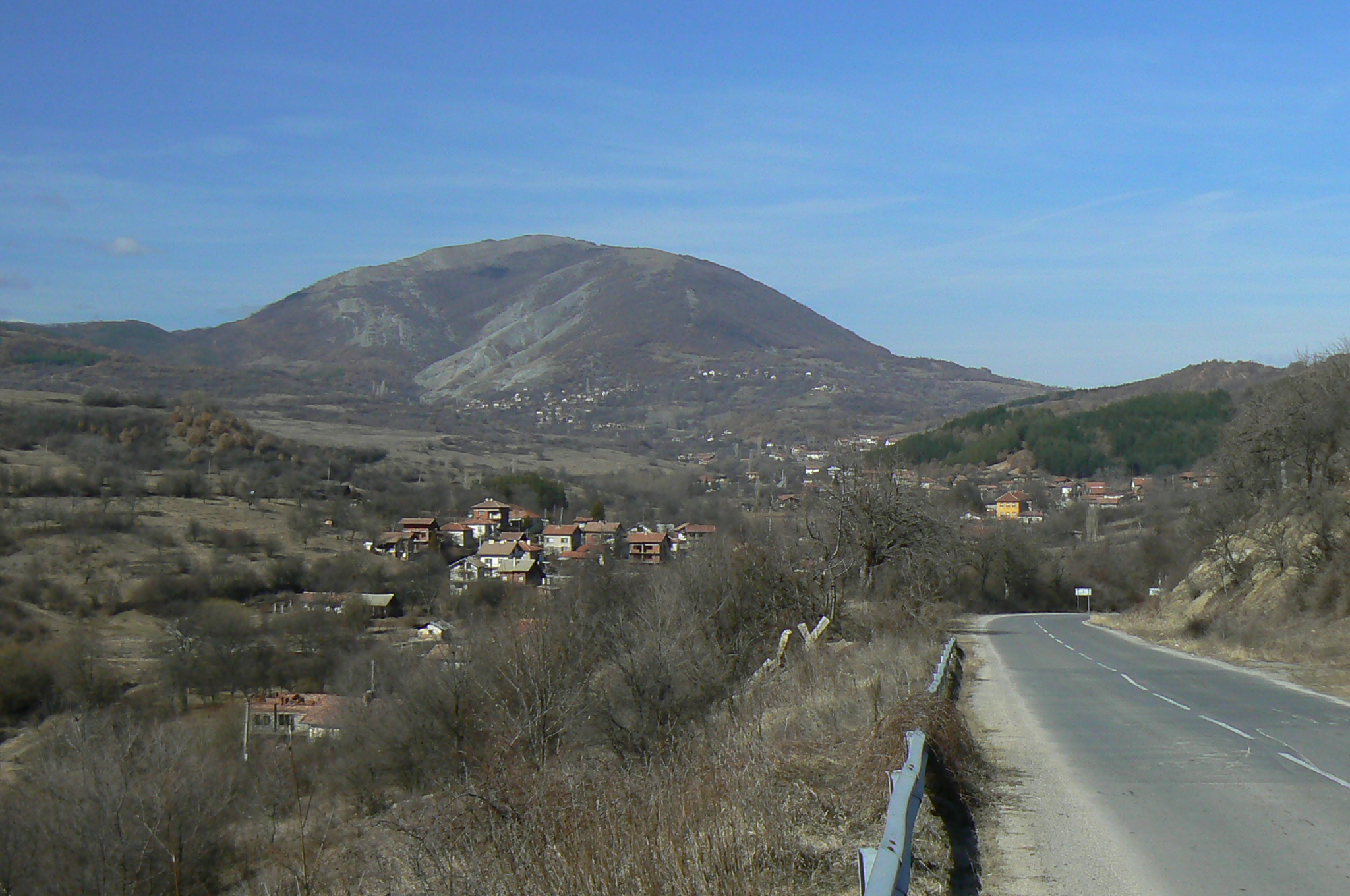
- Village Babino at the foot of Konyavska planina (Konyavska mountain) in Bulgaria

- Location within Bulgaria
- Coordinates: 42.3500°N 22.9667°E
- Country: Bulgaria
- Province: Kyustendil Province
- Municipality: Bobov Dol
- Time zone: UTC+2 (EET)
  - Summer (DST): UTC+3 (EEST)

Babino is a village in Bobov Dol Municipality, Kyustendil Province, south-western Bulgaria.
