= Gorna Koznitsa =

Gorna Koznitsa Горна Козница
- Village
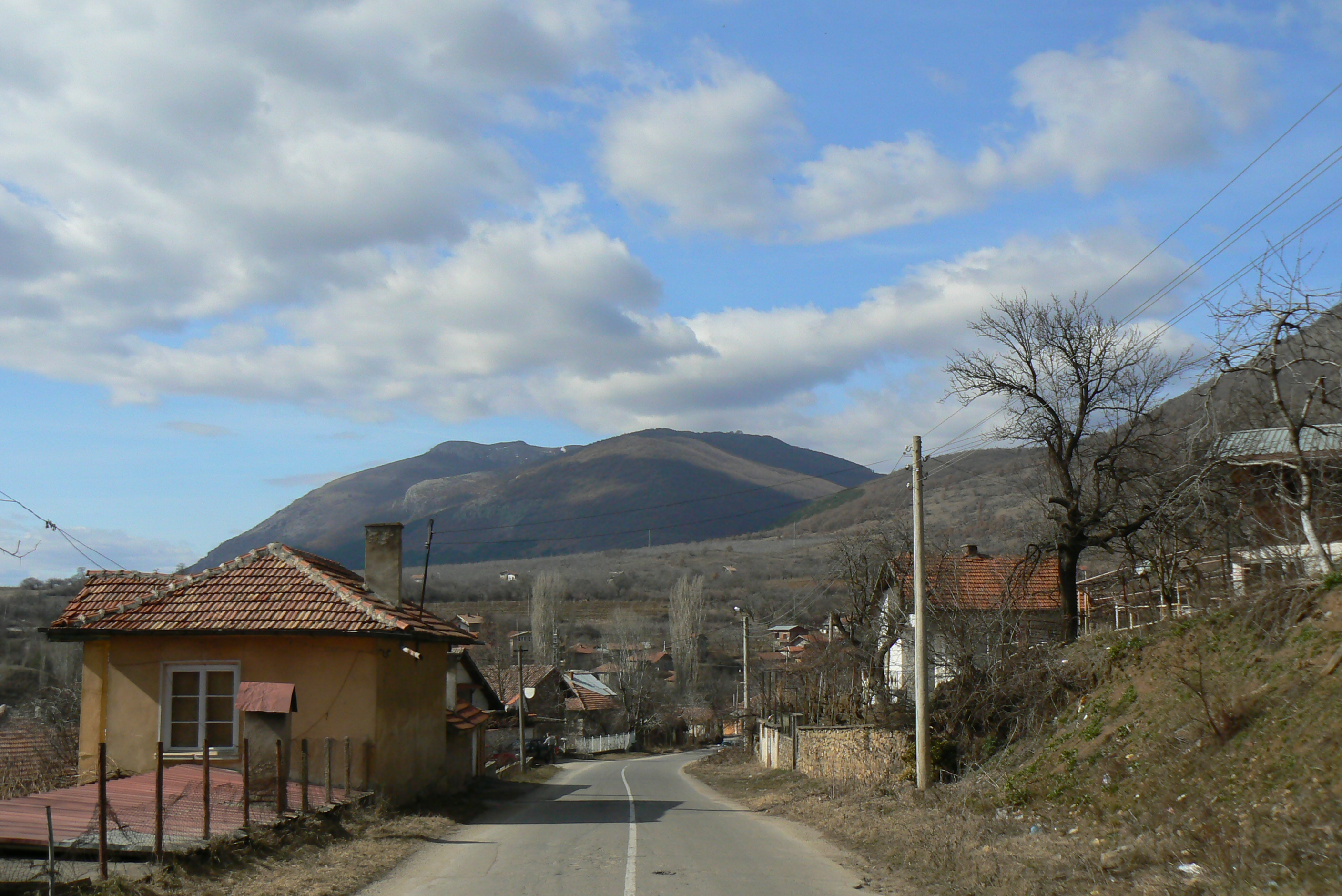
- Village Gorna Koznitza in the folds of Konyavska planina (Konyavska mountain) in Bulgaria

- Location within Bulgaria
- Coordinates: 42.3167°N 22.9167°E
- Country: Bulgaria
- Province: Kyustendil Province
- Municipality: Bobov Dol
- Time zone: UTC+2 (EET)
  - Summer (DST): UTC+3 (EEST)

Gorna Koznitsa is a village in Bobov Dol Municipality, Kyustendil Province, south-western Bulgaria.
