= Bistritsa, Kyustendil Province =

Bistritsa Бистрица на Марин
- Village
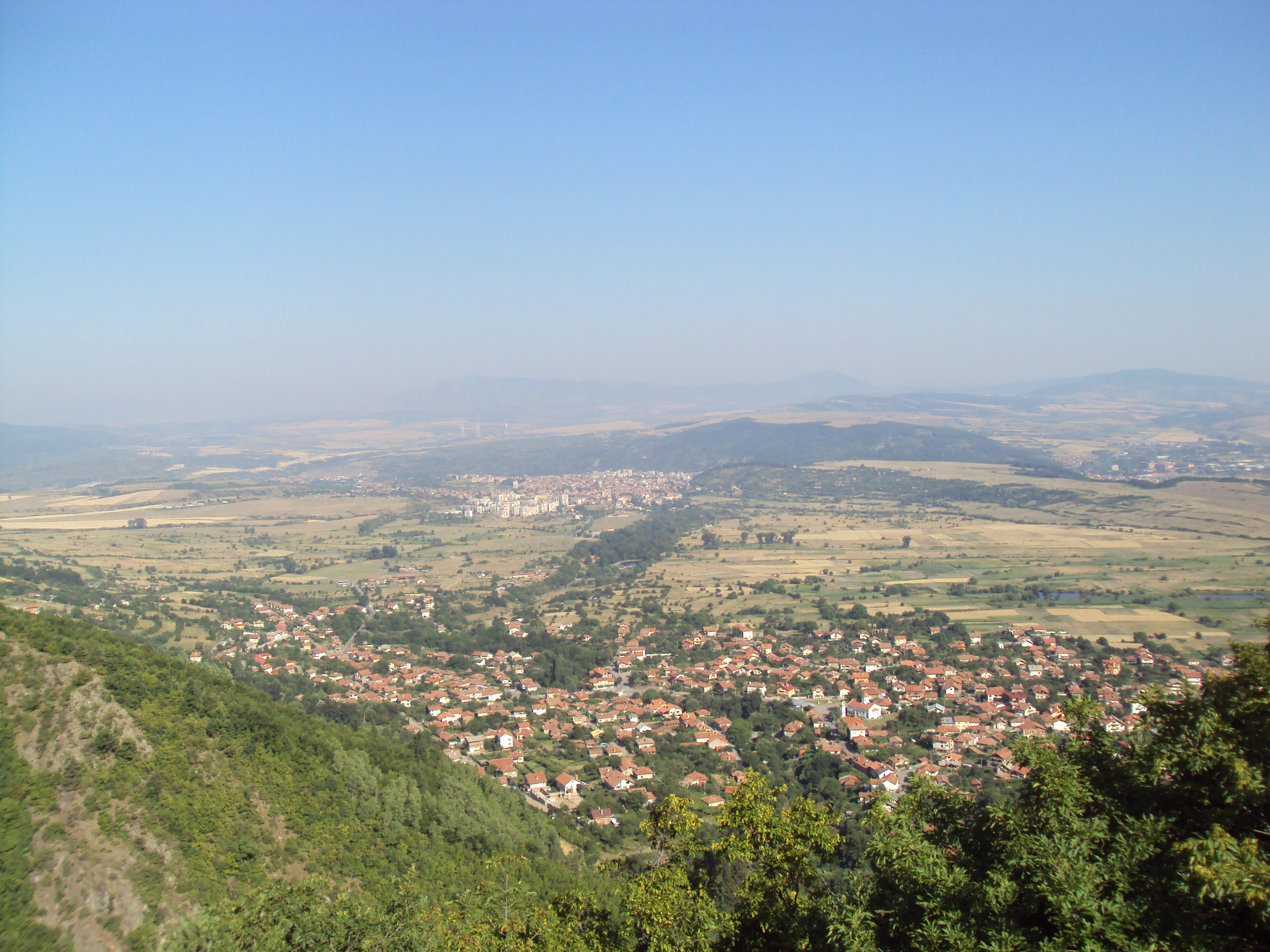
- View from the national park

- Location within Bulgaria
- Coordinates: 42.2333°N 23.1667°E
- Country: Bulgaria
- Province: Kyustendil Province
- Municipality: Dupnitsa
- Time zone: UTC+2 (EET)
  - Summer (DST): UTC+3 (EEST)

Bistritsa (Bulgarian: Бистрица) is a village in Dupnitsa Municipality, Kyustendil Province, south-western Bulgaria.
