= Georgi Vasilev (footballer, born 1946) =

Bulgarian footballer

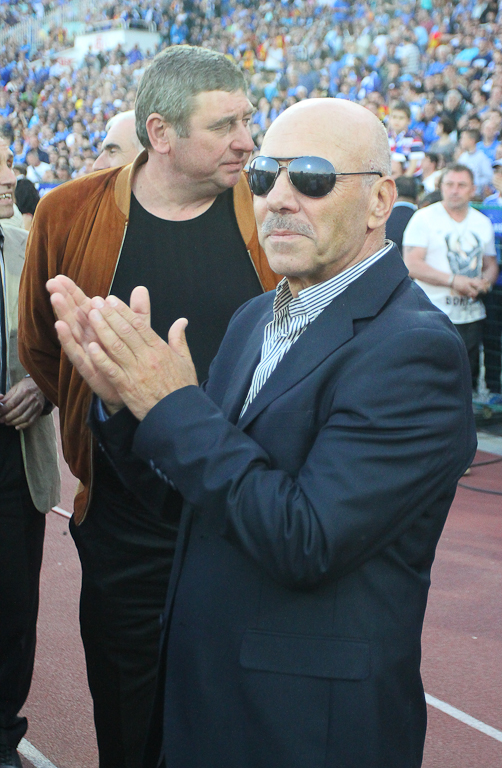

Personal information
- Full name: Georgi Vasilev Ivanov
- Date of birth: 9 August 1946 (age 80)
- Place of birth: Bobov Dol, Bulgaria
- Position: Midfielder

Senior career*
Years	Team	Apps	(Gls)
1961–1965	Cherveno Zname		
1967	Sliven		
1967–1968	Lokomotiv GO		
1968–1969	Marek Dupnitsa	31	(12)
1969–1977	Etar	178	(19)

Managerial career
- 1977–1979: Levski Strazhitsa (assistant)
- 1979–1981: Etar (assistant)
- 1981–1984: Etar
- 1984–1985: Spartak Pleven
- 1985–1986: Bulgaria (assistant)
- 1986–1992: Etar
- 1993–1995: Levski Sofia
- 1995: Anorthosis
- 1996–1998: CSKA Sofia
- 1998–1999: Lokomotiv Sofia
- 1999–2002: Union Berlin
- 2003: Nea Salamis
- 2003–2004: Levski Sofia
- 2006: Union Berlin
- 2006–2007: Naftex Burgas
- 2007–2008: Levadiakos
- 2009–2010: Nesebar
- 2011: Chernomorets Burgas
- 2015–2017: Etar
- * Club domestic league appearances and goals

Georgi Vasilev Ivanov (Bulgarian: Георги Василев Иванов; born 9 August 1946), nicknamed Gocheto and The General, is а Bulgarian former football manager and player.

== Biography ==
Born in Bobovdol, Vasilev began his football career at Cherveno Zname of Radomir, representing the team between 1961 and 1965, before moving to FC Sliven in 1967 and then to Lokomotiv Gorna Oryahovitsa in 1967–68. He also played for Marek Dupnitsa (1968–69) and Etar Veliko Tarnovo (1969–77), featuring in 220 matches and scoring 32 goals in the A PFG. While at Etar, he graduated in history from Veliko Tarnovo University.

Finishing the Cologne school for football managers, Vasilev's first team as a manager was Levski Strazhitsa, which he managed in 1977–79. He was then appointed to work at Etar as an assistant manager (1979–81) and manager (until 1992, with some interruptions). In 1984–85 he was at the helm of Spartak Pleven and in 1985–86 he was the assistant manager of the Bulgaria national team.

Vasilev managed Levski Sofia in 1993–95, the Cypriot Anorthosis Famagusta, CSKA Sofia (1996–98) and Lokomotiv Sofia, before taking up Union Berlin, whom he led to the 2nd Bundesliga and a German Cup final, as well as UEFA Cup participation. He then moved to Nea Salamis Famagusta FC in the spring of 2003 and returned to Levski Sofia in 2003–04 only to once again briefly manager Union Berlin in January 2006. From April 2006 to the summer of 2007, he was in charge of B PFG side Naftex Burgas. In June 2007, Vasilev was announced as the new manager of Greek club Levadiakos. Between December 2009 to June 2010 he managed PFC Nesebar. From March 2011 to May 2011 he led Chernomorets Burgas.

Vasilev has won the A PFG with Etar (1991), Levski (1994, 1995) and CSKA (1997), as well as the Bulgarian Cup with Levski (1994) and CSKA (1997). While in charge of Levski, Vasilev eliminated the Scottish Rangers F.C. from the UEFA Champions League 1993–94. He has been honoured as the coach of the 20th century of Veliko Tarnovo.
