= Golemo Selo =

Golemo Selo Големо Село
- Village
- Location of Golemo Selo
- Coordinates: 42°17′36″N 23°02′31″E
- Country: Bulgaria
- Provinces (Oblast): Kyustendil Province

Government
  - Mayor: Kiril Pandurski

Area
  - Total: 15.124 km^{2} (5.839 sq mi)
- Elevation: 508 m (1,667 ft)

Population (2007-01-01)
  - Total: 576
  - Density: 38.1/km^{2} (98.6/sq mi)
- Time zone: UTC+2 (EET)
  - Summer (DST): UTC+3 (EEST)
- Postal Code: 2635

Golemo Selo (Bulgarian: Големо Село) is a small village located between the towns of Dupnitsa and Bobov Dol in Kyustendil Province, western Bulgaria. The village name means "big village". The population of the village is 573 inhabitants (according to the Bulgarian National Statistical Institute data 2007). At the borders of the village, to the south-west, is situated the Bobov Dol Power Plant.

The village is located 9 km (5.6 mi) from Dupnitza and 9.7 km (6.0 mi) from Bobov dol. The distance to the capital Sofia is 50 km (31 mi).

The area has been proven to be inhabited from ancient times. The ruins of the palace of Aron of Bulgaria was found near the village. He was killed along with his family nearby by orders of his brother Samuil on 14 June 976 because of treason.
