= Novoselyane =

Novoselyane Новоселяне
- Village
- Location within Bulgaria
- Coordinates: 42.3167°N 22.9833°E
- Country: Bulgaria
- Province: Kyustendil Province
- Municipality: Bobov Dol
- Time zone: UTC+2 (EET)
  - Summer (DST): UTC+3 (EEST)

Novoselyane is a village in Bobov Dol Municipality, Kyustendil Province in south-western Bulgaria. The etymology of the village comes from Slavic languages meaning new village, Novo Selo.
