= Golema Fucha =

Golema Fucha Bulgarian: Голема Фуча
- Village
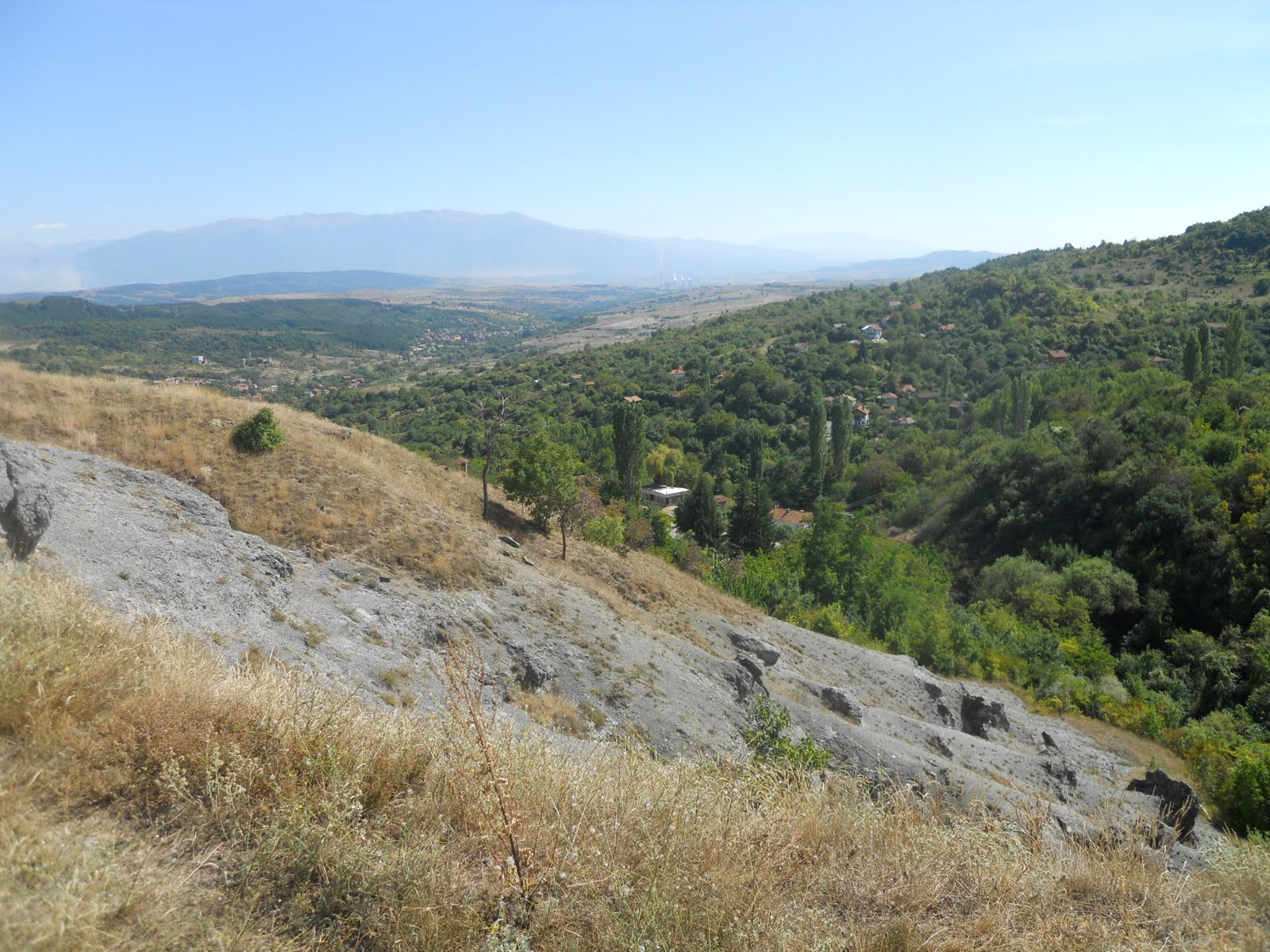

- Location within Bulgaria
- Coordinates: 42.3833°N 22.9500°E
- Country: Bulgaria
- Province: Kyustendil Province
- Municipality: Bobov Dol
- Time zone: UTC+2 (EET)
  - Summer (DST): UTC+3 (EEST)

Golema Fucha is a village in Bobov Dol Municipality, Kyustendil Province, south-western Bulgaria.
