= Drumohar =

Drumohar Друмохар
- Village
- Location within Bulgaria
- Coordinates: 42.2333°N 22.8667°E
- Country: Bulgaria
- Province: Kyustendil Province
- Municipality: Nevestino
- Time zone: UTC+2 (EET)
  - Summer (DST): UTC+3 (EEST)

Drumohar is a village in Nevestino Municipality, Kyustendil Province, south-western Bulgaria.

There is one shop and one house to stay in.
