= Pobit Kamak, Kyustendil Province =

Pobit Kamak Побит камък
- Village
- Location within Bulgaria
- Coordinates: 42.5969°N 22.4544°E
- Country: Bulgaria
- Province: Kyustendil Province
- Municipality: Treklyano
- Time zone: UTC+2 (EET)
  - Summer (DST): UTC+3 (EEST)

Pobit Kamak is a village in Treklyano Municipality, Kyustendil Province, south-western Bulgaria. The village of Pobit Kamak has only two inhabitants in 2011, down from its peak of 235 people in 1934 (in 1881, short after the liberation of Bulgaria, there were already 152 people living in this village). One inhabitant is between the ages of 75-79 while the other inhabitant is 85+ years old. That means that this village will be a ghost village in a few years as both inhabitants are elderly.
