= Panicharevo =

Panicharevo Паничарево
- Village
- Location within Bulgaria
- Coordinates: 42.2833°N 23.0000°E
- Country: Bulgaria
- Province: Kyustendil Province
- Municipality: Bobov Dol
- Time zone: UTC+2 (EET)
  - Summer (DST): UTC+3 (EEST)

Panicharevo is a village in Bobov Dol Municipality, Kyustendil Province, south-western Bulgaria.
