= Blato (Pirot) =

Blato Блато
- Village
- Location within Serbia
- Coordinates: 43°08′54″N 22°29′49″E
- Country: Serbia
- Region: Southern and Eastern Serbia
- District: Pirot
- Municipality: Pirot

Population (2002)
  - Total: 630
- Time zone: UTC+1 (CET)
  - Summer (DST): UTC+2 (CEST)

Blato is a village in the municipality of Pirot, Serbia. According to the 2002 census, the village has a population of 630 people.
