= Shatrovo, Bulgaria =

Shatrovo Шатрово Shatra
- Village
- Location within Bulgaria
- Coordinates: 42.3000°N 22.9833°E
- Country: Bulgaria
- Province: Kyustendil Province
- Municipality: Bobov Dol
- Time zone: UTC+2 (EET)
  - Summer (DST): UTC+3 (EEST)

Shatrovo (Bulgarian: Шатрово) is a village in Bobov Dol Municipality, Kyustendil Province, south-western Bulgaria.
