= Mikulovice (Třebíč District) =

- Municipality
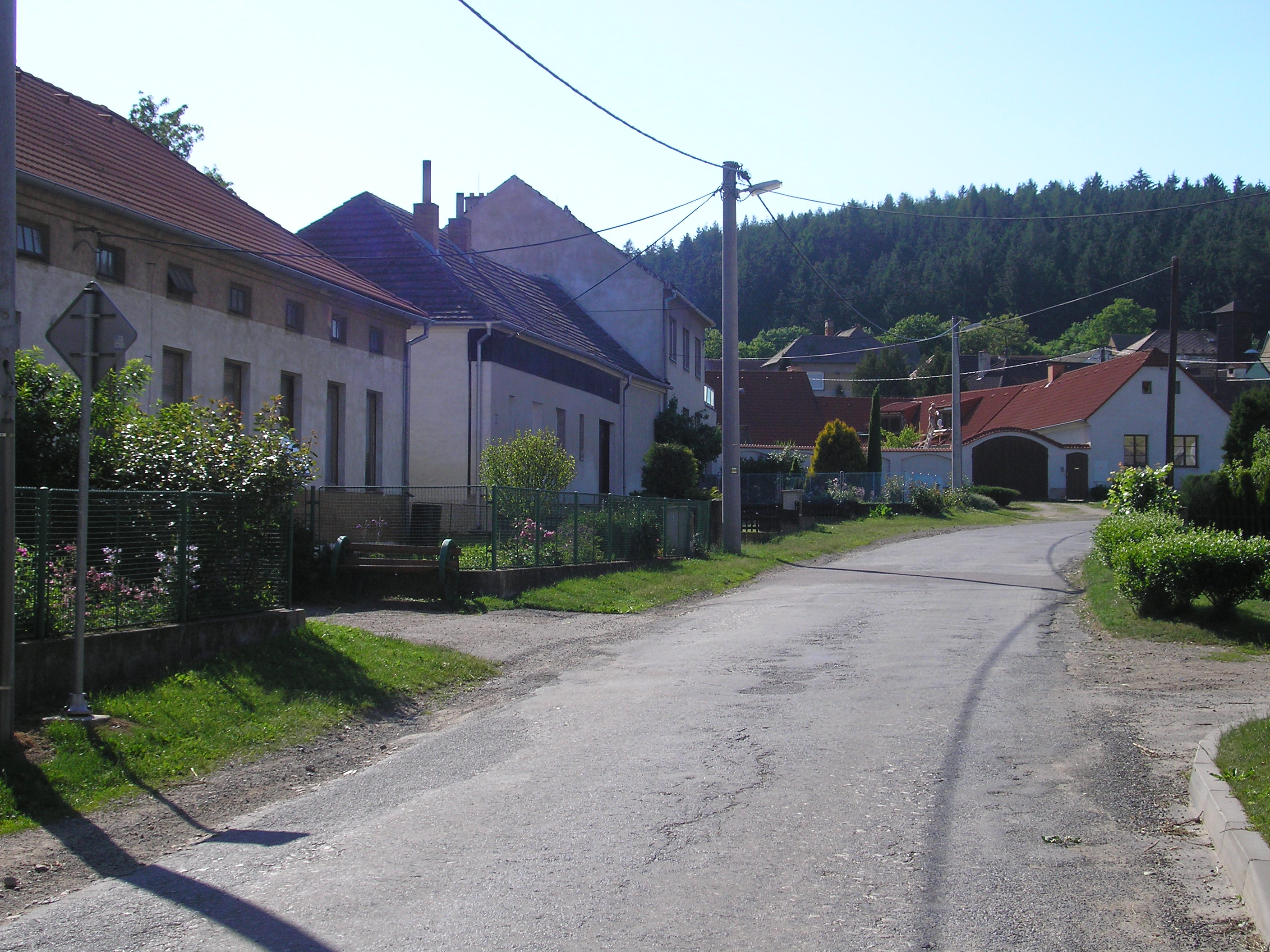
- Centre of Mikulovice

- Location in the Czech Republic
- Coordinates: 49°9′42″N 15°50′48″E
- Country: Czech Republic
- Region: Vysočina
- District: Třebíč
- First mentioned: 1348

Area
  - Total: 4.18 km^{2} (1.61 sq mi)
- Elevation: 523 m (1,716 ft)

Population (2026-01-01)
  - Total: 221
  - Density: 52.9/km^{2} (137/sq mi)
- Time zone: UTC+1 (CET)
  - Summer (DST): UTC+2 (CEST)
- Postal code: 675 22
- Website: www.mikulovice.info

Mikulovice (German: Nikolowitz) is a municipality and village in Třebíč District in the Vysočina Region of the Czech Republic. It has about 200 inhabitants.

Mikulovice lies approximately 7 kilometres (4 mi) south of Třebíč, 33 km (21 mi) south-east of Jihlava, and 146 km (91 mi) south-east of Prague.

== Demographics ==
Historical population
Year	Pop.	±%
1869	255	—
1880	294	+15.3%
1890	298	+1.4%
1900	319	+7.0%
1910	354	+11.0%
1921	372	+5.1%
1930	346	−7.0%
1950	286	−17.3%
1961	289	+1.0%
1970	254	−12.1%
1980	252	−0.8%
1991	234	−7.1%
2001	218	−6.8%
2011	210	−3.7%
2021	209	−0.5%
Source: Censuses
