= Shatrovo, Kurgan Oblast =

Rural locality in Kurgan Oblast, Russia

Coordinates: 56°31′10″N 64°38′00″E

Shatrovo (Russian: Шатрово) is a rural locality (a selo) and the administrative center of Shatrovsky District, Kurgan Oblast, Russia. Population: 5,688 (2010 census); 6,441 (2002 census); 7,308 (1989 Soviet census).
