= Shatrovo, Vologda Oblast =

Shatrovo Шатрово
- Village
- Location within Vologda Oblast Location within Russia
- Coordinates: 60°47′N 46°22′E
- Country: Russia
- Region: Vologda Oblast
- District: Velikoustyugsky District
- Time zone: UTC+3:00

Shatrovo (Russian: Шатрово) is a rural locality (a village) in Yudinskoye Rural Settlement, Velikoustyugsky District, Vologda Oblast, Russia. The population was 16 as of 2002.

== Geography ==
Shatrovo is located 7 km northeast of Veliky Ustyug (the district's administrative centre) by road. Pazukhi is the nearest rural locality.
