= Shatrovsky District =

Shatrovsky District Шатровский район
- District
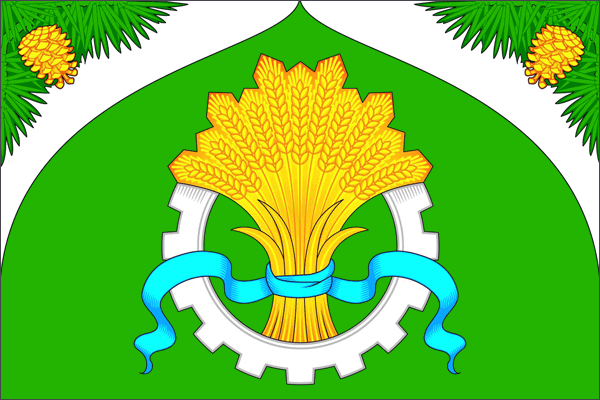
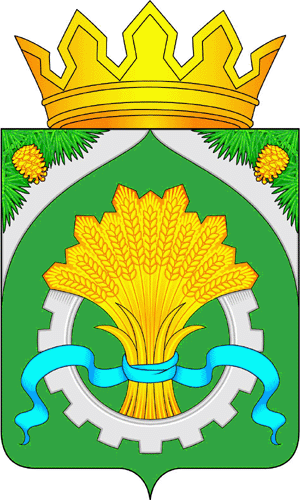
- Flag Coat of arms
- Location of Shatrovsky District in Kurgan Oblast
- Coordinates: 56°31′20″N 64°38′0″E
- Country: Russia
- Federal subject: Kurgan Oblast
- Established: 1924
- Administrative center: Shatrovo

Area
  - Total: 3,580 km^{2} (1,380 sq mi)

Population (2010 Census)
  - Total: 18,446
  - Density: 5.15/km^{2} (13.3/sq mi)
  - Urban: 0%
  - Rural: 100%

Administrative structure
  - Administrative divisions: 17 selsoviet
  - Inhabited localities: 61 rural localities

Municipal structure
  - Municipally incorporated as: Shatrovsky Municipal District
  - Municipal divisions: 0 urban settlements, 17 rural settlements
- Time zone: UTC+5 (MSK+2)
- OKTMO ID: 37640000

Shatrovsky District (Russian: Шатровский райо́н) is an administrative and municipal district (raion), one of the twenty-four in Kurgan Oblast, Russia. It is located in the north of the oblast. The area of the district is 3,580 square kilometers (1,380 sq mi). Its administrative center is the rural locality (a selo) of Shatrovo. Population: 18,446 (2010 Census); 23,009 (2002 Census); 28,435 (1989 Soviet census). The population of Shatrovo accounts for 30.8% of the district's total population.
