= Mikulovice (Pardubice District) =

- Municipality
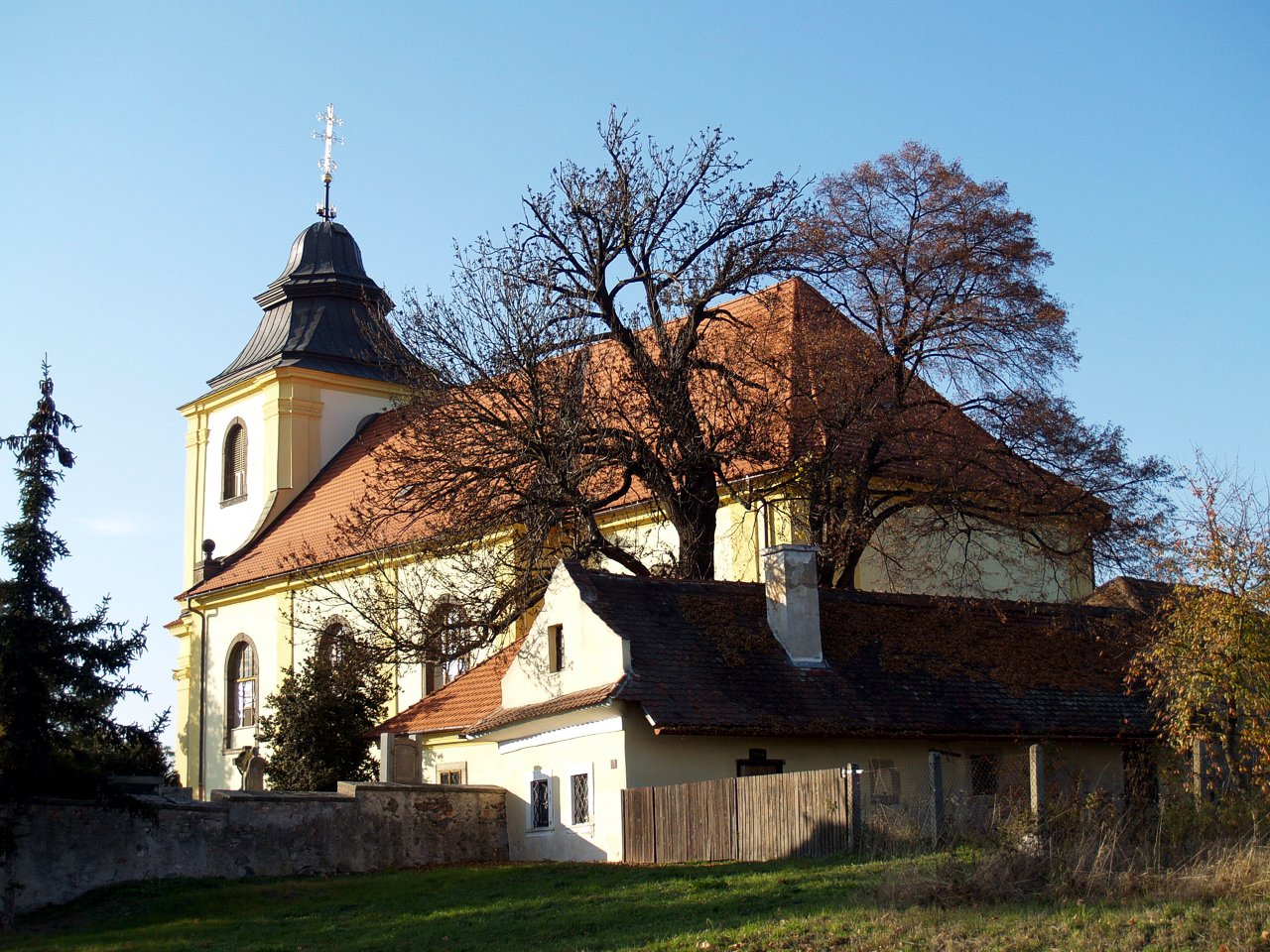
- Church of Saint Wenceslaus

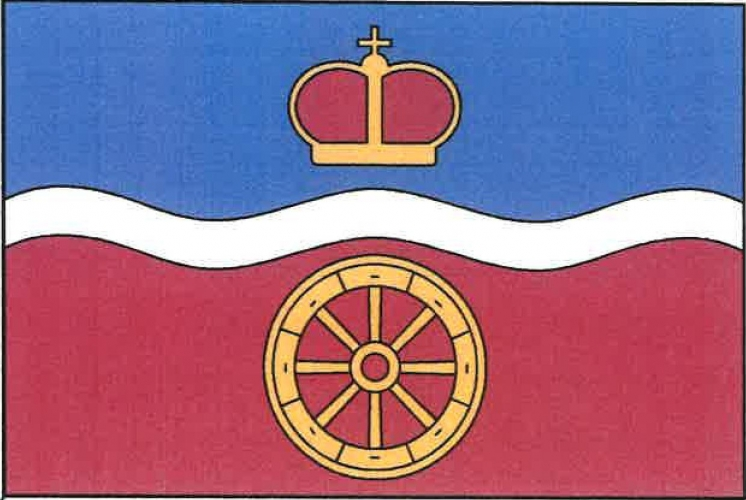
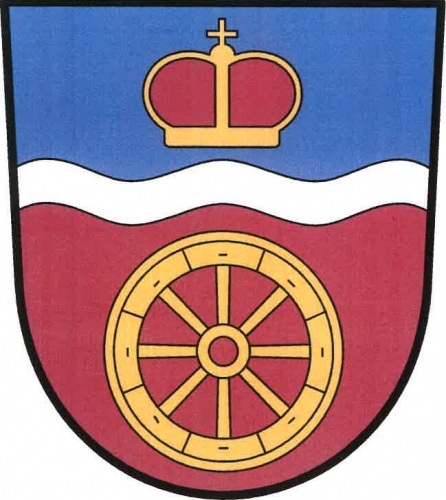
- Flag Coat of arms

- Location in the Czech Republic
- Coordinates: 49°59′22″N 15°46′32″E
- Country: Czech Republic
- Region: Pardubice
- District: Pardubice
- First mentioned: 1384

Area
  - Total: 3.44 km^{2} (1.33 sq mi)
- Elevation: 252 m (827 ft)

Population (2026-01-01)
  - Total: 1,324
  - Density: 385/km^{2} (997/sq mi)
- Time zone: UTC+1 (CET)
  - Summer (DST): UTC+2 (CEST)
- Postal code: 530 02
- Website: www.obecmikulovice.cz

Mikulovice is a municipality and village in Pardubice District in the Pardubice Region of the Czech Republic. It has about 1,300 inhabitants.

== Administrative division ==
Mikulovice consists of two municipal parts (in brackets population according to the 2021 census):

- Mikulovice (1,043)
- Blato (302)

== Demographics ==
Historical population
| Year | Pop. | ±% |
|---|---|---|
| 1869 | 617 | — |
| 1880 | 649 | +5.2% |
| 1890 | 797 | +22.8% |
| 1900 | 831 | +4.3% |
| 1910 | 983 | +18.3% |
| 1921 | 881 | −10.4% |
| 1930 | 930 | +5.6% |
| 1950 | 844 | −9.2% |
| 1961 | 879 | +4.1% |
| 1970 | 799 | −9.1% |
| 1980 | 781 | −2.3% |
| 1991 | 720 | −7.8% |
| 2001 | 796 | +10.6% |
| 2011 | 1,116 | +40.2% |
| 2021 | 1,345 | +20.5% |
Source: Censuses
