= Treklyano Municipality =

Treklyano Municipality Община Трекляно
- Municipality
- Location within Bulgaria
- Coordinates: 42°33′N 22°36′E
- Country: Bulgaria
- Province: Kyustendil
- Municipality: Treklyano

Area
  - Total: 257.83 km^{2} (99.55 sq mi)

Population (1-Feb-2011)
  - Total: 629
  - Density: 2.44/km^{2} (6.32/sq mi)
- Time zone: UTC+2 (EET)
  - Summer (DST): UTC+3 (EEST)
- Website: www.trekliano.eu

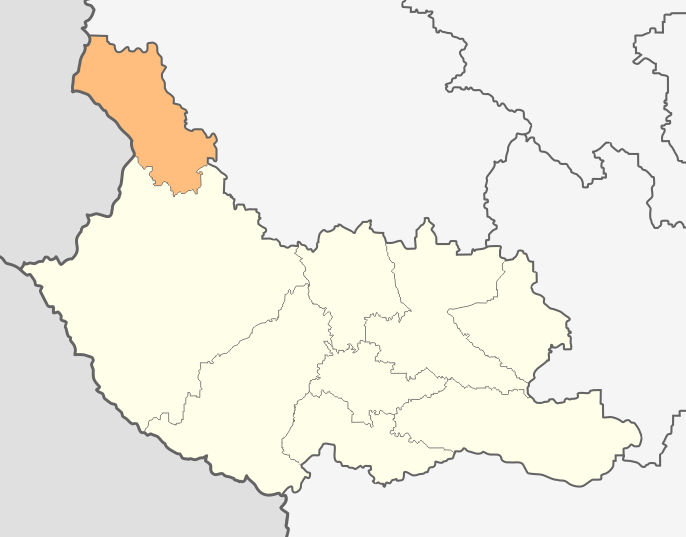
Treklyano municipality within Kyustendil Province

Treklyano Municipality (Bulgarian: Община Трекляно, trl Obština Trekljano) is a municipality in Kyustendil Province, Bulgaria. The administrative centre is Treklyano.

== Demographics ==
According to the 2021 Census, the municipality of Treklyano has only 434 inhabitants living in 19 small villages. This makes Treklyano the smallest municipality in entire Bulgaria.

=== Religion ===
According to the latest Bulgarian census of 2011, the religious composition, among those who answered the optional question on religious identification, was the following:

Religious composition of Treklyano Municipality
Orthodox Christianity	93.0%
Catholicism	0.8%
Protestantism	0.0%
Islam	0.0%
No religion	4.3%
Prefer not to answer, others and indefinable	1.9%
