= Nevestino Municipality =

Nevestino Municipality Община Невестино
- Municipality
- Location within Bulgaria
- Coordinates: 42°15′N 22°51′E
- Country: Bulgaria
- Province: Kyustendil
- Municipality: Nevestino

Area
  - Total: 439.69 km^{2} (169.77 sq mi)

Population (1-Feb-2011)
  - Total: 2,821
  - Density: 6.416/km^{2} (16.62/sq mi)
- Time zone: UTC+2 (EET)
  - Summer (DST): UTC+3 (EEST)
- Website: www.obshtinanevestino.kncity.info

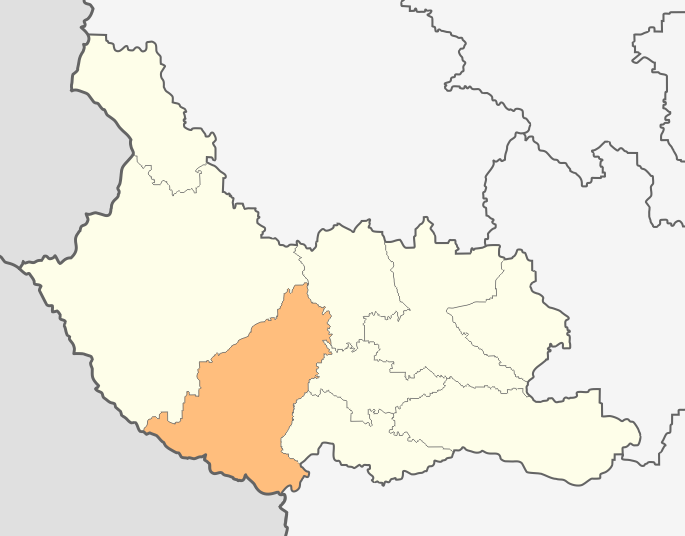
Nevestino municipality within Kyustendil Province

Nevestino Municipality is a municipality in Kyustendil Province, Bulgaria. The administrative centre is Nevestino.

== Demography ==
=== Religion ===
According to the latest Bulgarian census of 2011, the religious composition, among those who answered the optional question on religious identification, was the following:

Religious composition of Nevestino Municipality
Orthodox Christianity	93.7%
Catholicism	0.2%
Protestantism	0.0%
Islam	0.0%
No religion	1.6%
Prefer not to answer, others and indefinable	4.5%
