= Kyustendil Province =

Province in southwestern Bulgaria

Coordinates: 42°15′N 23°0′E

Kyustendil Province Област Кюстендил
- Province
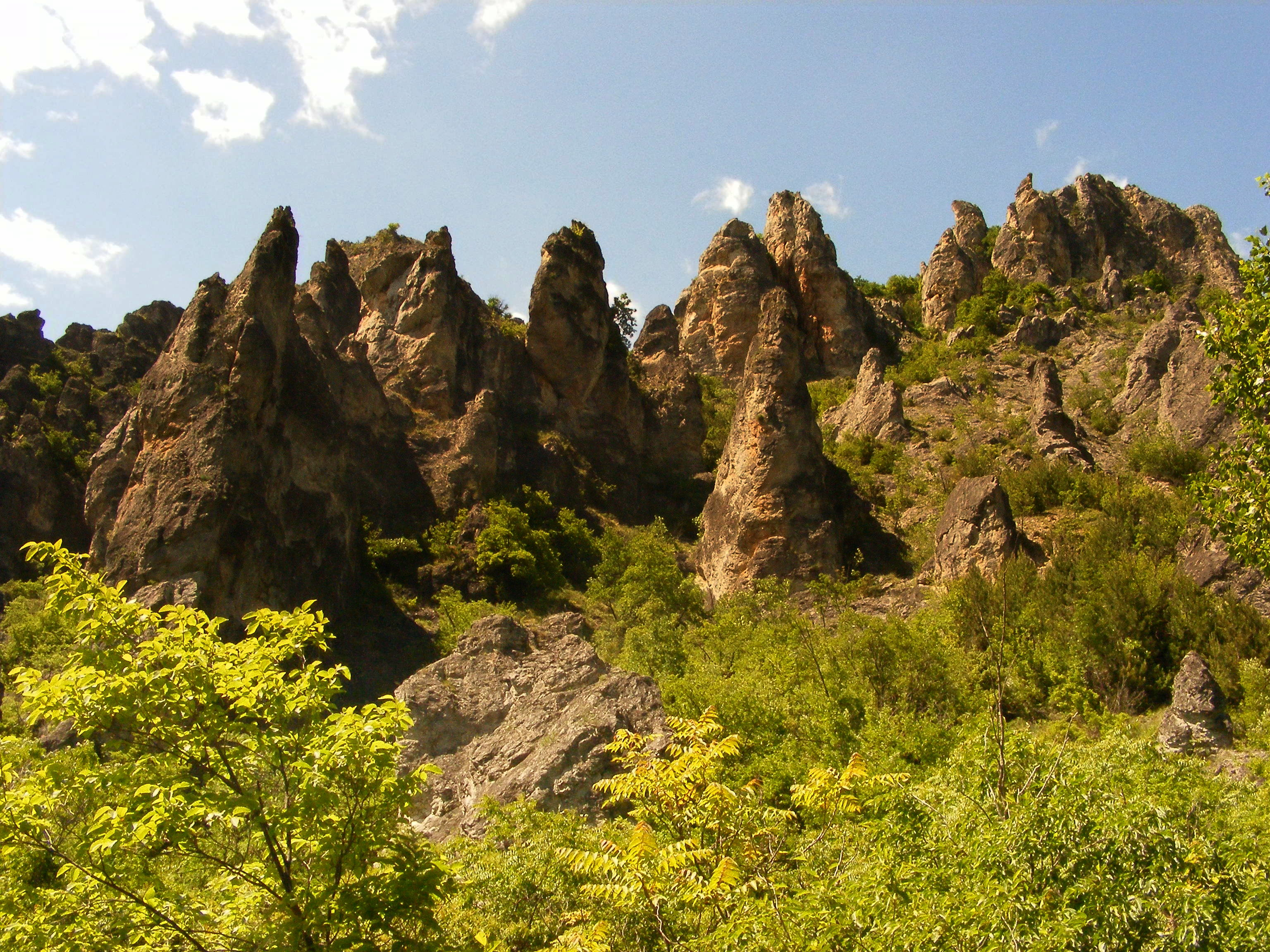
- Shegava Canyon

- Flag

- Location of Kyustendil Province in Bulgaria
- Country: Bulgaria
- Capital: Kyustendil
- Municipalities: 9

Government
  - Governor: Metodi Chimev

Area
  - Total: 3,084 km^{2} (1,191 sq mi)

Population (2024)
  - Total: 106,131
  - Density: 34.41/km^{2} (89.13/sq mi)
- Time zone: UTC+2 (EET)
  - Summer (DST): UTC+3 (EEST)
- License plate: KH
- Website: kn.government.bg

Kyustendil Province (Bulgarian: Област Кюстендил, romanized: Oblast Kyustendil) is a province in southwestern Bulgaria, extending over an area of 3,084.3 km^{2} (1,190.9 sq mi) (constituting 2.7% of the total territory of the Republic of Bulgaria), and with a population of 106 131. It borders the provinces of Sofia, Pernik, and Blagoevgrad; to the west, its limits coincide with the state borders between Bulgaria and North Macedonia, and between Bulgaria and the Republic of Serbia. The administrative center of the Province is Kyustendil.

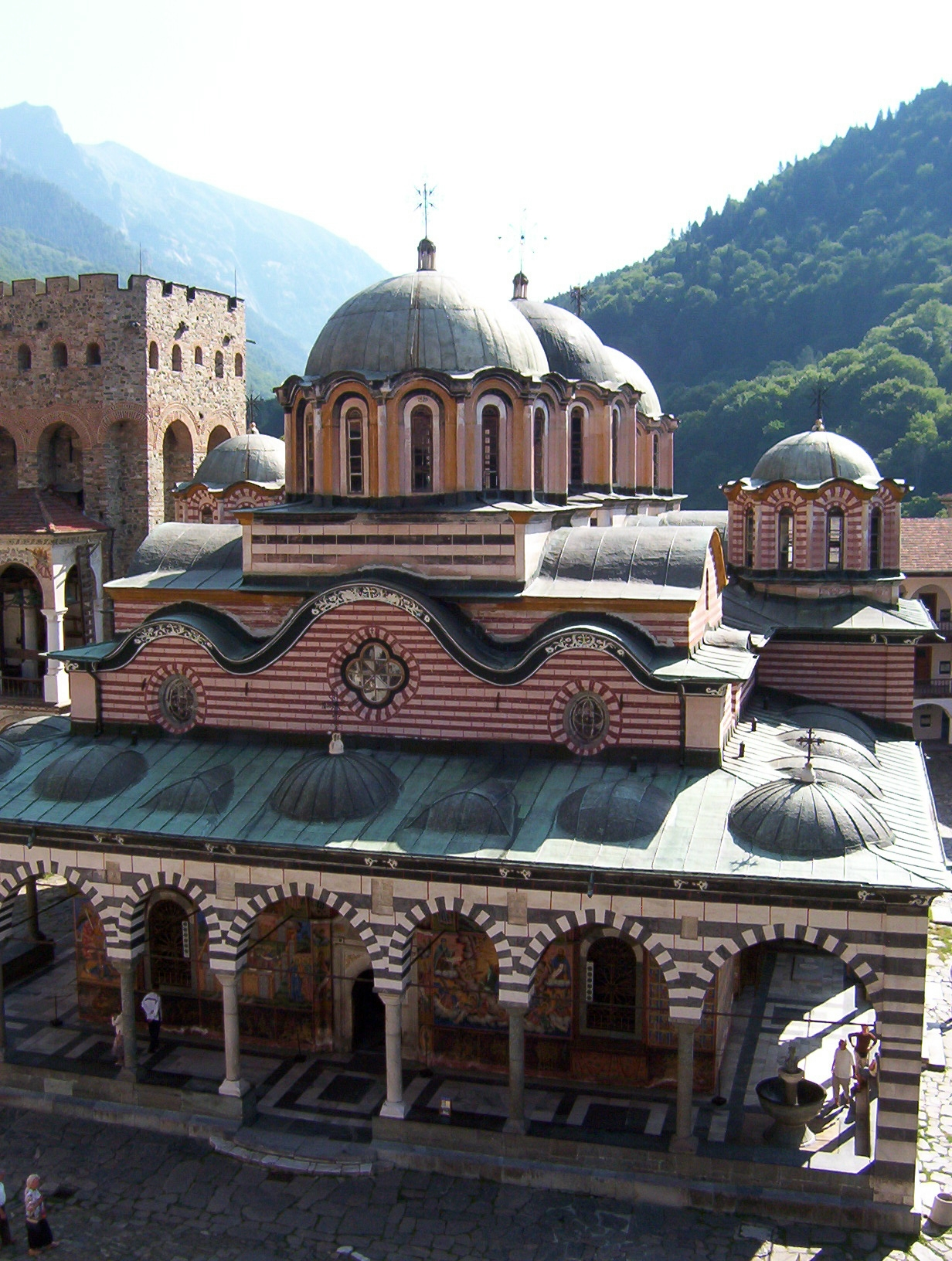
The Rila monastery

== Geography ==
The region features diverse surface relief—fertile valleys and canyons, separated by hillocks and mountains. The northern and western parts of the territory form the so-called "Kyustendilsko kraishte" (Kyustendil Cornerland) and include parts of the cross-border Milevska, Chudinska, Zemenska and—to the east—Konyavska mountains. To the south, the Kyustendilsko kraishte reaches as far as the valleys of the Dragovishtitsa and Bistritsa rivers, as well as the Lisets mountain. The southern part of the region includes massifs of the Osogovo, Vlahina and northwestern Rila mountains, embracing the Kamenitsa, Kyustendil and Dupnitsa lowerlands.

The region is divided in two under-districts: Kyustendil in west and Dupnitsa in east. In Dupnitsa region there are the geographic areas of Gorno pole (Upper field), Dolno pole (Lower field), and the area Razmetanitsa where the Emperor Samuil of Bulgaria killed his brother Aron and his family.

The region abounds with granites, clays, fossils, and ores. Polymetal ores are excavated in Osogovo; brown coals in the Bobov dol mines. Clays deposits are located at the villages of Chetirtsi, Yahinovo and Dragovishtitsa. The region, however, is most famous for its numerous mineral water springs: hot mineral water springs in Kyustendil, Sapareva banya, the villages of Nevestino and Chetirtsi. A marvel of nature, found in the region are the Stobski piramidi (Stob pyramids).

For the most part, the climate is transcontinental, but at higher altitudes it is mountainous. The main drainage river is Struma whose subsidiaries are the Treklyanska, Dragovishtitsa, Bistritsa, Slokoshtitsa, Novoselska, Dzherman and Rila rivers. Subterranean water levels are relatively high. Near the village of Kamenichka Skakavitsa, the Golemi dol river forms a 70-meter-high waterfall. The Dyakovo, Bersin, Drenov dol and Bagrentsi artificial lakes (dams) are chiefly used for irrigation purposes. Soil composition is most favorable for the traditionally developed fruit-growing.

Forest vegetation is mostly deciduous, although coniferous forests are present. The Gabra natural reservation (area: 89,5 metric hectares) houses the last remaining black-pine trees.

== Administration ==
The region of Kyustendil includes nine municipalities with 182 settlements. The regional administrative center is the town of Kyustendil situated in its southwestern part: the Kyustendil lowerland. The town serves as the administrative center of the municipality of Kyustendil (with an area of 923 km^{2} (356 sq mi), this municipality represents 30,2% of the total territory of the Region), with a population of 73 346, of whom 51 300 are residents of the town area. Four main transport routes pass through Kyustendil: from North Macedonia on the Skopie-Sofia high-way; from Serbia on the Niš-Bosilegrad-Kyustendil highway; through Dupnitsa and Kyustendil passes the oldest commercial road that for centuries has linked Constantinople and the Adriatic Sea. Kyustendil has managed to preserve is historical, ecological and cultural heritage. It is a contemporary Bulgarian administrative center, whose future is mostly seen in the development of cultural tourism, and modern rehabilitation resort centers by the hot mineral water springs.

== Municipalities ==
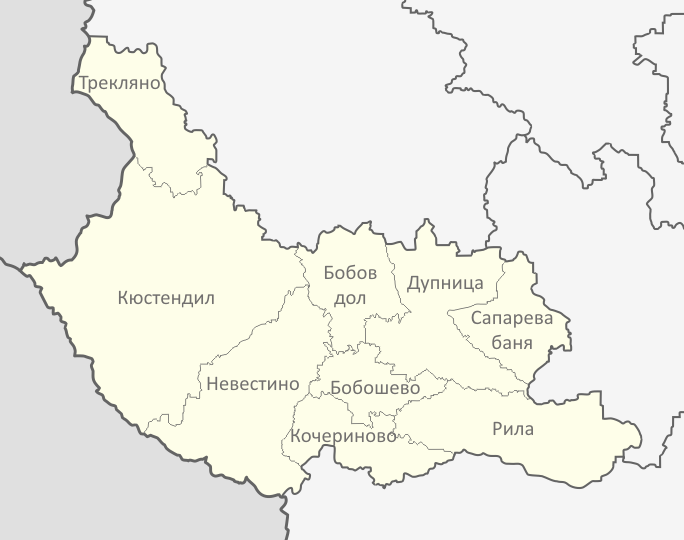
Municipalities in Kyustendil province

The Kyustendil province (област, oblast) contains nine municipalities (singular: община, obshtina, plural: общини, obshtini). The following table shows the names of each municipality in English and Cyrillic, the main town (in bold) or village, and the population as of 2011.

Municipality	Cyrillic	Pop.	Town/Village	Pop.
Boboshevo	Бобошево	3,016	**Boboshevo**	1,383
Bobov dol	Бобов дол	10,266	**Bobov dol**	6,664
Dupnitsa	Дупница	44,988	**Dupnitsa**	33,519
Kocherinovo	Кочериново	4,506	**Kocherinovo**	2,190
Kyustendil	Кюстендил	60,681	**Kyustendil**	44,532
Nevestino	Невестино	2,738	Nevestino	629
Rila	Рила	3,424	**Rila**	2,937
Sapareva banya	Сапарева баня	8,165	**Sapareva banya**	4,326
Treklyano	Трекляно	547	Treklyano	226

== Demographics ==
Historical population
Year	Pop.	±%
1946	199,936	—
1956	193,571	−3.2%
1965	197,096	+1.8%
1975	198,876	+0.9%
1985	190,714	−4.1%
1992	181,347	−4.9%
2001	162,534	−10.4%
2011	136,686	−15.9%
2021	111,736	−18.3%
Source: pop-stat.mashke.org

Kyustendil Province had a population of 106 131 as of 31 December 2024, of which 50 908 were male and 55 223 were female.

=== Ethnic groups ===
Ethnic groups in Kyustendil Province (2021 census)
Ethnic group	Percentage
Bulgarians	91.0%
Romani	5.9%
others and indefinable	3.1%

Total population (2021 census): 113 440

Ethnic groups (2021 census):

Of 108 675 persons:

- Bulgarians in Bulgaria: 101 735 (93.2 %)
- Romani people in Bulgaria 6 555 (6.0 %)
- Turks in Bulgaria 56 (0.1 %)
- Others and indefinable: 329 (0.3 %)

Ethnic groups in the province according to the 2001 census:

- Bulgarians in Bulgaria: 152 644 (94.0 %)
- Romani people in Bulgaria: 8 294 (5.1 %)
- Others and indefinable: 1 596 (0.9 %)

Most of the Romani live within the city limits of the provincial centre, where they number 3 797 (8 .1 % of the city’s 46 856 inhabitants). Most of the rest are found in the second largest city of Dupnitsa, where they are 2 227 (6 .2 % of the city’s 35 930 inhabitants).

=== Language ===
Mother tongues in the province according to the 2021 census:

- 101 911 Bulgarian language (91.2%)
- 6 225 Romani language (5.6%)
- 3 542 others and unspecified (3.2%)

=== Religion ===
Religions in Kyustendil Province (2001 census)
Religious group	Percentage
Orthodox Christian	95.1%
Protestant Christian	0.6%
Muslim	0.1%
Roman Catholic Christian	0%
others and indefinable	4.1%

Religious adherence in the province according to 2001 census:

Census 2001
religious adherence	population	%
Orthodox Christians	154 637	95.1%
Protestants	928	0.6%
Muslims	231	0.1%
Roman Catholics	76	0%
Other	1 013	0.6%
Religion not mentioned	5 649	3.5%
**total**	**162 534**	100%

== See also ==
- Provinces of Bulgaria
- Municipalities of Bulgaria
- List of cities and towns in Bulgaria
- List of villages in Kyustendil Province
