= II-82 road (Bulgaria) =

Road in Bulgaria

Republic Road I-82
- Републикански път I-82

Route information
- Length: 86.3 km (53.6 mi)

Major junctions
- From: Km 114.8 of I-8, Kostenets
- To: Km 48.6 of II-18, Sofia

Location
- Country: Bulgaria
- Towns: Kostenets, Samokov, Sofia

Highway system
- Highways in Bulgaria

Republican Road II-82 (Bulgarian: Републикански път II-82) is a 2nd class road in Bulgaria, running through the territory of Sofia Province and Sofia City Province. Its length is 86.3 km.

== Route description ==
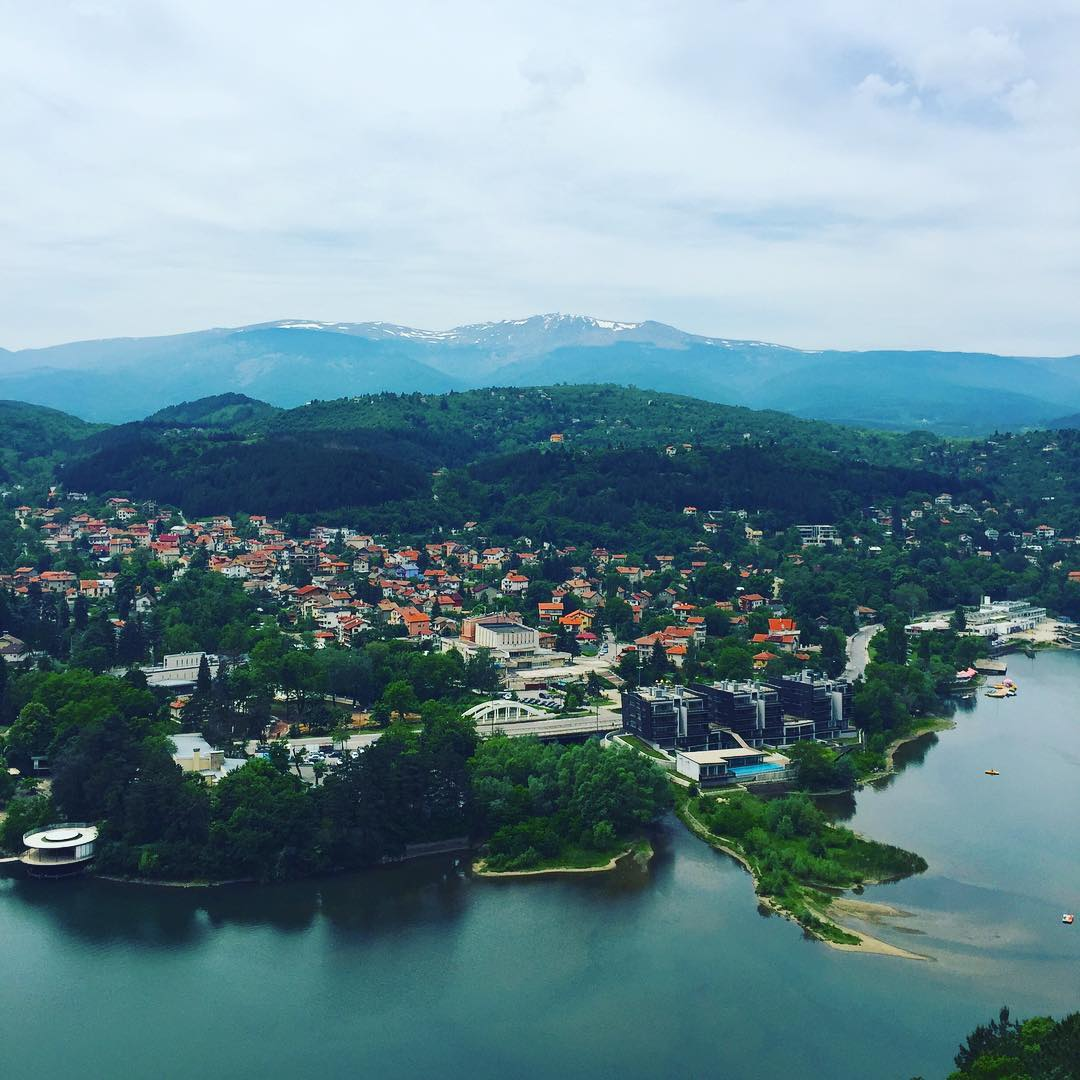
The road at Pancharevo

The road starts at Km 114.8 of the first class I-8 road in the center of the town of Kostenets and heads west through the southern reaches of the Kostenets–Dolna Banya Valley. It passes through the spa town of Dolna Banya and the villages of Maritsa and Raduil and ascends to the Borovets ski resort (1,335 m) in the northern slopes of the highest mountain range in the Balkans, Rila. From Borovets the II-82 descends to the Samokov Valley to the north along the river Musalenska Bistritsa, runs through the homonymous town in direction south–north and after exiting the valley enters the short Kalkovo Gorge on the river Iskar at the latter's confluence with the Palakaria. Then, for 11 km it runs parallel to the western shores of the Iskar Reservoir, the largest in Bulgaria.

Downstream from the dam, in the vicinity of the village of Dolni Pasarel, the road enters the 22 km Pancharevo Gorge between the mountain ranges of Vitosha and Plana to the west and Lozen Mountain of Sredna Gora to the east. After exiting the gorge, the II-82 runs parallel to the western shores of Lake Pancharevo, passing through the villages of Kokalyane and Pancharevo. Some 2 km north of the latter the road reaches its terminus at Km 48.6 of the Sofia Ring Road (II-18) at the Gorublyane neighbourhood of the capital Sofia.

In the center of Samokov, it intersects with the eastern terminus of the second class II-62 road Kyustendil–Dupnitsa–Samokov.
