= Pancharevo =

Coordinates: 42°34′15″N 23°26′23″E

Pancharevo Панчарево
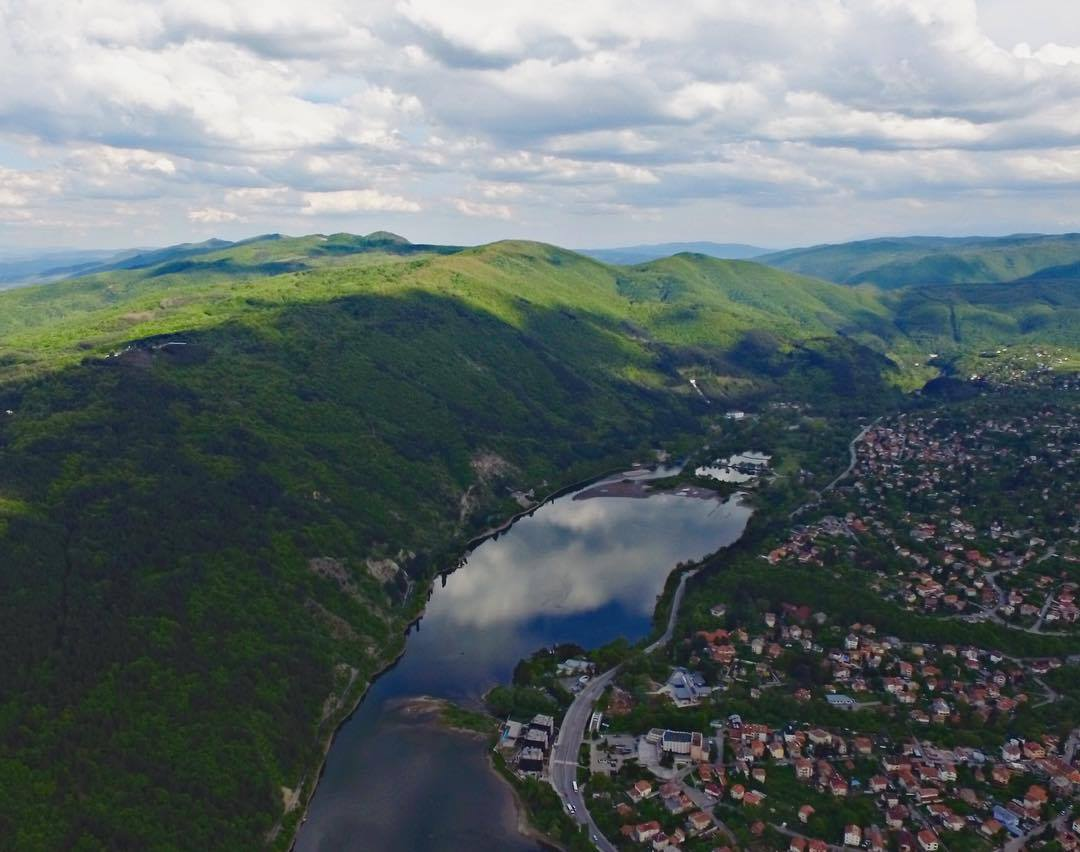
- Pancharevo and the lake, viewed from the air
- Interactive map of Pancharevo
- Country: Bulgaria
- Province (Oblast): Sofia City
- Named as "Pancharevo": 16th century

Government
  - Mayor: Nikolay Gyurov
- Elevation: 700 m (2,300 ft)

Population (Census 2011)
  - Total: 3,433
- Time zone: UTC+2 (EET)
- Postal Code: 1137
- Area code: (+359) 02 992
- Car plates: C, CA, CB
- Website: www.pancharevo.org, www.pancharevo-bg.com

Pancharevo (Bulgarian: Панчарево, pronounced [pant͡ʃɐˈrɛvo], also transcribed as Pančarevo) is a district located on the outskirts of the Bulgarian capital Sofia and occupies the southeastern part of the Capital Municipality. Geographically, it lies partially in the Sofia Valley and the mountain ranges of Vitosha, Plana and Lozenska, a division of Sredna Gora.As of 2011 the village has 3,433 inhabitants, but the district has about 28,000 inhabitants. It is the largest region in Sofia with a total area of 364.7 km^{2} (140.8 sq mi). It includes the largest artificial lake in Bulgaria, the Iskar Reservoir, as well as Lake Pancharevo and Pasarel Reservoir, located along the river Iskar in the Pancharevo Gorge. The district consists of 10 villages, with the village of Pancharevo serving as the district seat:

- Bistritsa
- Dolni Pasarel
- German
- Kazichene
- Kokalyane
- Krivina
- Lozen
- Pancharevo
- Plana
- Zheleznitsa

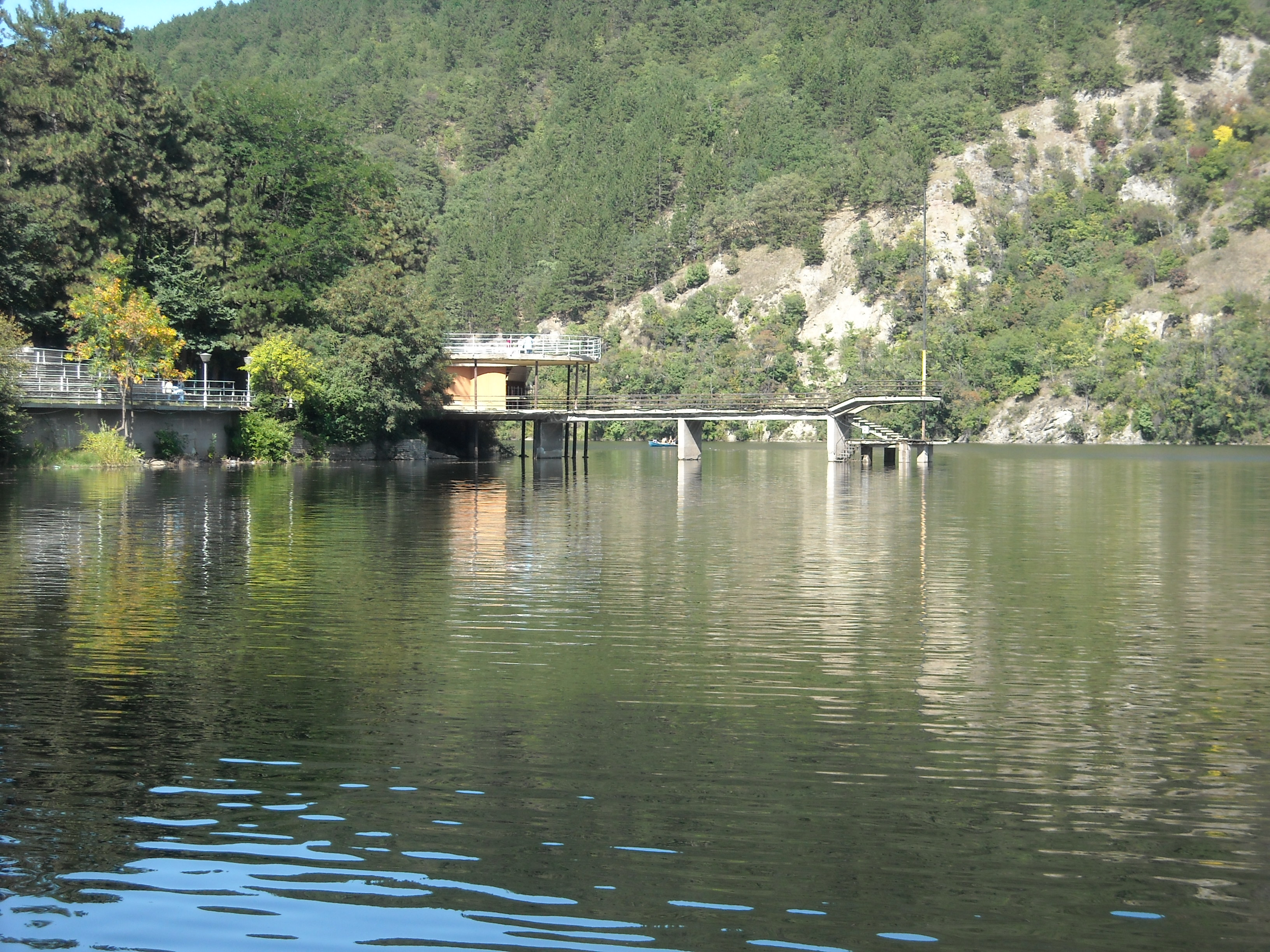
Pancharevo Lake

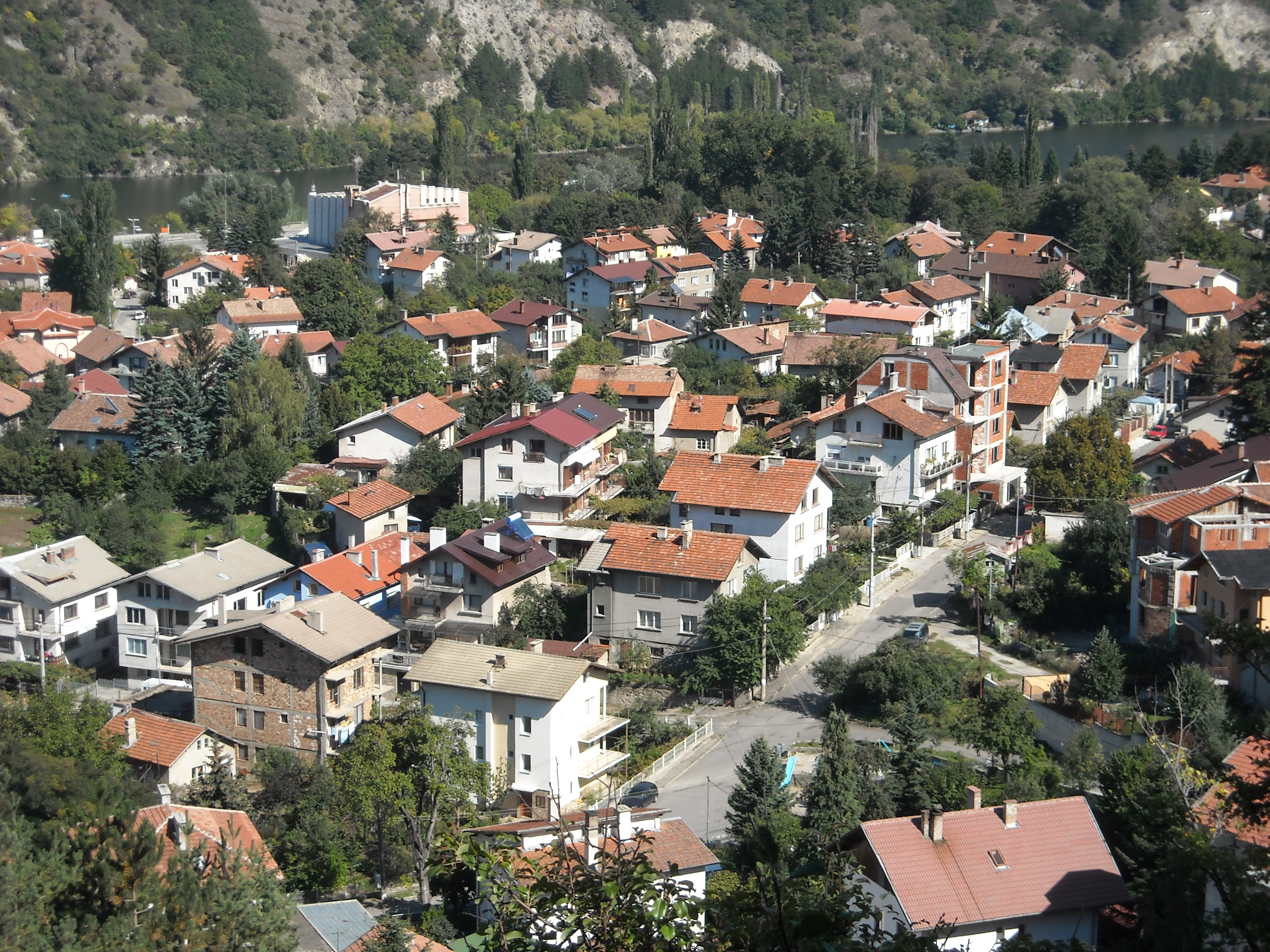
Village of Pancharevo

The district offers excellent conditions for relaxation and tourism for the citizens of the capital. The large dams are used for water sports, fishing, camping and boat trips. There are many historical sights from the Middle Ages which include the ruins of the Urvich fortress which was the site of a desperate and unsuccessful battle against the Turkish invaders in the late 14th century during the Bulgarian–Ottoman wars. There are many monasteries and chapels, of which some lie in ruins since the fall of the Second Bulgarian Empire.

The village of Pancharevo is located 12 km southeast of the city center of Sofia, along Samokovsko shose str. It lies at 700 m. above sea level between Vitosha and Lozen mountains, and at the end of the Pancharevo gorge of Iskar River. In Pancharevo Vitoshka Bistritsa River, sloping steeply from the highest parts of the mountain, flows into Lake Pancharevo.

Pancharevo has modern suburban houses for all-year living as well as gated residence areas, and has easy access to the Sofia Ring Road, Business Park Sofia, Tsarigradsko shose, Sofia Airport, Samokov and Borovets.

== History ==
The Pancharevo mineral springs were probably known to the Thracians, who founded a settlement named Rilyanik, meaning abundant spring. Later the name was transformed. During the Roman rule there were baths on the site that were well supported by the aristocracy and the local population, and around them formed a rich imperial estate with vineyards.

Pancharevo and its environs have retained significant traces of the Roman Empire. Then was a mineral bath which had seven pools. There are reasons to believe that at both the springs in Sofia and at Pancharevo has practiced the cult of the physician god Asklepios and the nymphs, as fragments of bas-reliefs of the three nymphs were found in both places. Over the bath in the area of "Gradishteto" were found the remains of Roman buildings and fortress designed to repel the barbarian invasions of the access routes from Serdica through the Iskar Gorge, in the direction of Samokov, but unfortunately no more extensive archeological studies were performed later in the area.

Pancharevo was first mentioned in the 16th-century Urvich Donation list as ПАНЧАР, ПАНЧАРЄВѠ, ПАНИЧАРЬ. Those early references allow linguists to derive its name from the noun pan(i)char, "bowl maker", itself from the noun panitsa ("bowl"). Panitsa might be a geographical term referring to a concave place.
