= Pancharevo Gorge =

Gorge in Bulgaria

- Панчаревски пролом
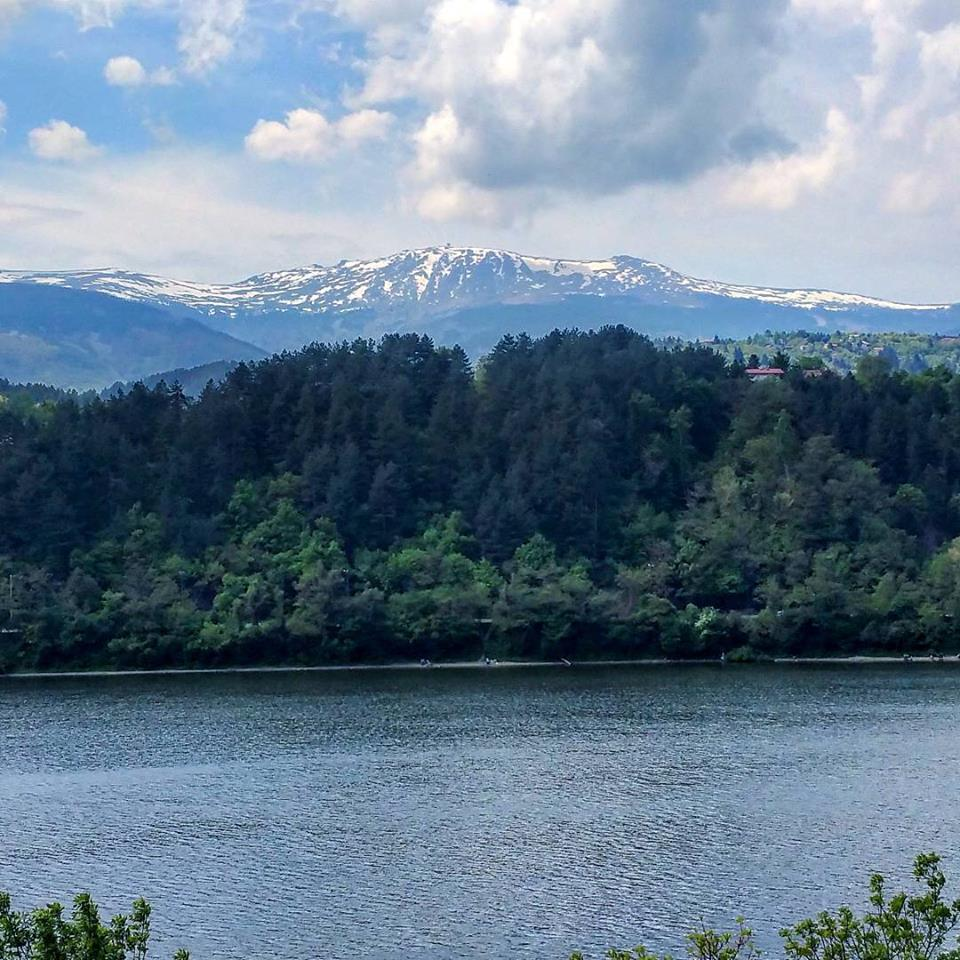
- The gorge at Lake Pancharevo with Vitosha at the background

- Location within Bulgaria
- Floor elevation: 700 m (2,300 ft)
- Length: 22 kilometres (14 mi)

Geology
- Type: Gorge

Geography
- Location: Ruy, Bulgaria
- Coordinates: 42°33′46″N 23°26′59″E
- Interactive map of Pancharevo Gorge

Pancharevo Gorge (Bulgarian: Панчаревски пролом) is a deep and narrow gorge in the upper course of the river Iskar in western Bulgaria. Administratively, it is part of the Pancharevo district of Sofia City Province.

== Geography ==
Pancharevo Gorge begins at an altitude of 786 m from the dam of the Iskar Reservoir, constructed in the lower section of the upper course of the Iskar, the longest river running entirely in Bulgarian territory. It follows the winding course of the river in general direction southeast–northwest for about 22 km, separating the mountain ranges of Plana to the southwest and Vitosha to the west from the Lozen Mountain division of the Sredna Gora range to the northeast. The gorge reaches the Sofia Valley at an altitude of 587 m at the village of German.

The average altitude is about 700 m; the depth varies between 200–250 m and 350 m. Near its middle section, the Iskar forms a large meander, declared a natural landmark, where on the right bank are the ruins of the medieval Urvich fortress, and on the left bank is the Kokalyane Monastery. There, the Iskar takes its left tributary, the Zheleznishka reka. In its upper section is located the small Pasarel Reservoir and in the lowermost part is Lake Pancharevo, both part of the Iskar hydro cascade.

== Settlements and landmarks ==
There are three villages along the gorge. Dolni Pasarel is located in a valley widening in the upper section. Kokalyane and Pancharevo are situated in the lower section and form a continuous urban zone. Along its entire length runs a 23.2 km stretch of the second class II-82 road Kostenets–Samokov–Sofia.

With its picturesque forested slopes and numerous landmarks, Pancharevo Gorge is a popular tourist destination and is easily accessible from the national capital Sofia. Lake Pancharevo provides favourable conditions for fishing, rowing and other outdoors activities. It has hosted the 1977 ICF Canoe Sprint World Championships. The homonymous village has mineral springs and related spa services. A few kilometers upstream is the Pancharevo Hydro Power Plant, the first one in Bulgaria and the Balkans, inaugurated in 1900. It was decommissioned in 1956 and declared a monument of culture in 1986.

Further upstream along the large meander of the Iskar is a complex of several sites dating from the Middle Ages. Raising on the rights bank are the ruins of the fortress of Urvich, which was part of the defenses of Sofia. It rose to prominence as an important stronghold of the Second Bulgarian Empire during the Bulgarian–Ottoman wars of the late 14th century. Less than a kilometer to the northeast is the Pancharevo Monastery, while on the opposite bank of the river about a kilometer to the south is the Kokalyane Monastery. Both were part of the cluster of 14 monasteries around medieval Sofia and were destroyed by the Ottomans after the fall of Bulgaria. They were restored in the 19th century. In the upper part of the gorge is located the Dolni Pasarel Monastery, established in the 15th century and also restored in the 19th century.
