= Lake Pancharevo =

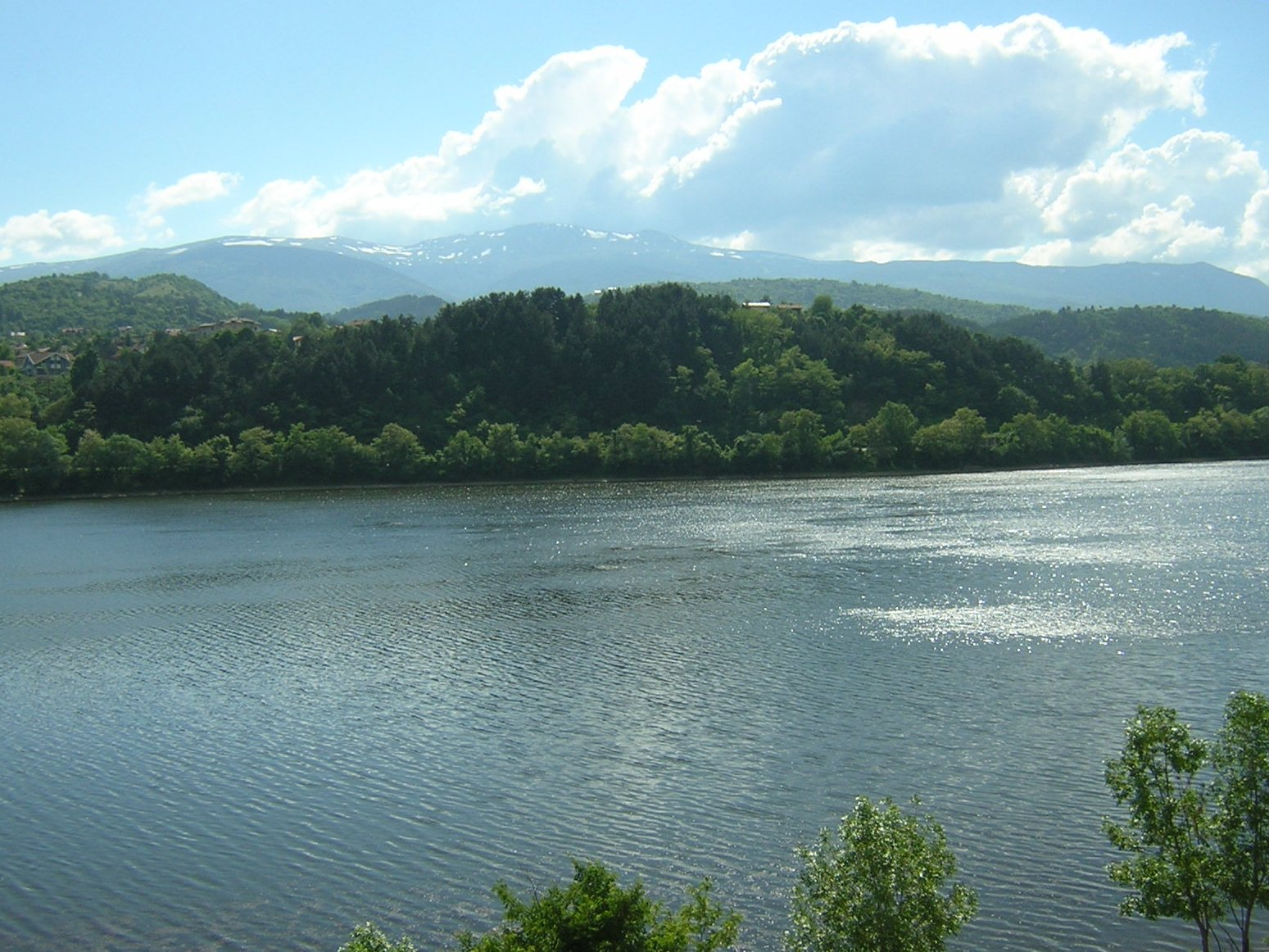
- View from the east bank, with the Vitosha Mountains in the background

- Location within Bulgaria
- Coordinates: 42°36′00″N 23°24′28″E
- Type: reservoir
- Basin countries: Bulgaria
- Max. length: 3 km (1.9 mi)
- Max. width: 700 m (2,300 ft)
- Max. depth: 30 m (98 ft)
- Water volume: 6.4 hm^{3} (5,200 acre⋅ft)
- Surface elevation: 600 m (2,000 ft)

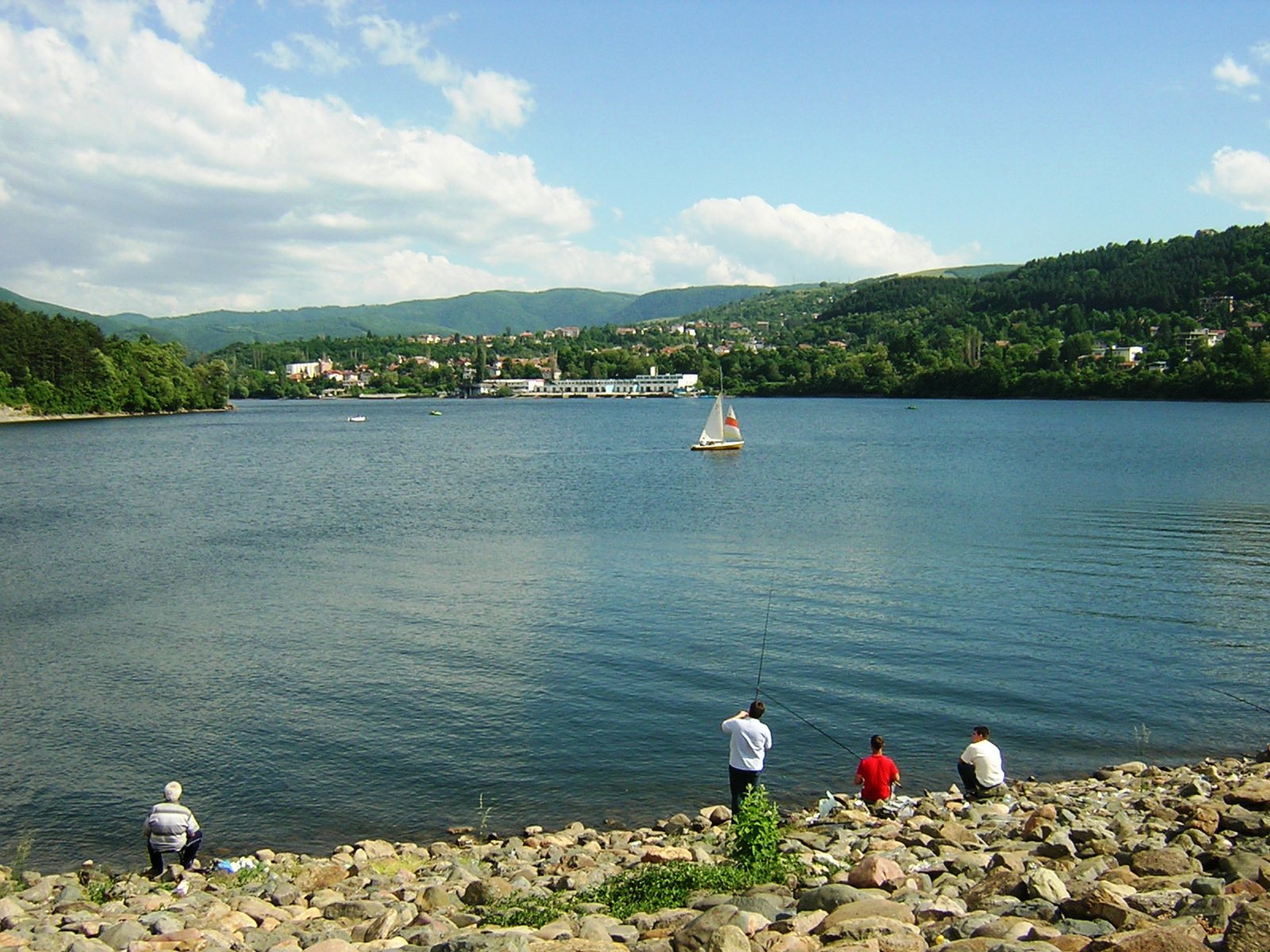
Lake Pancharevo from the dam

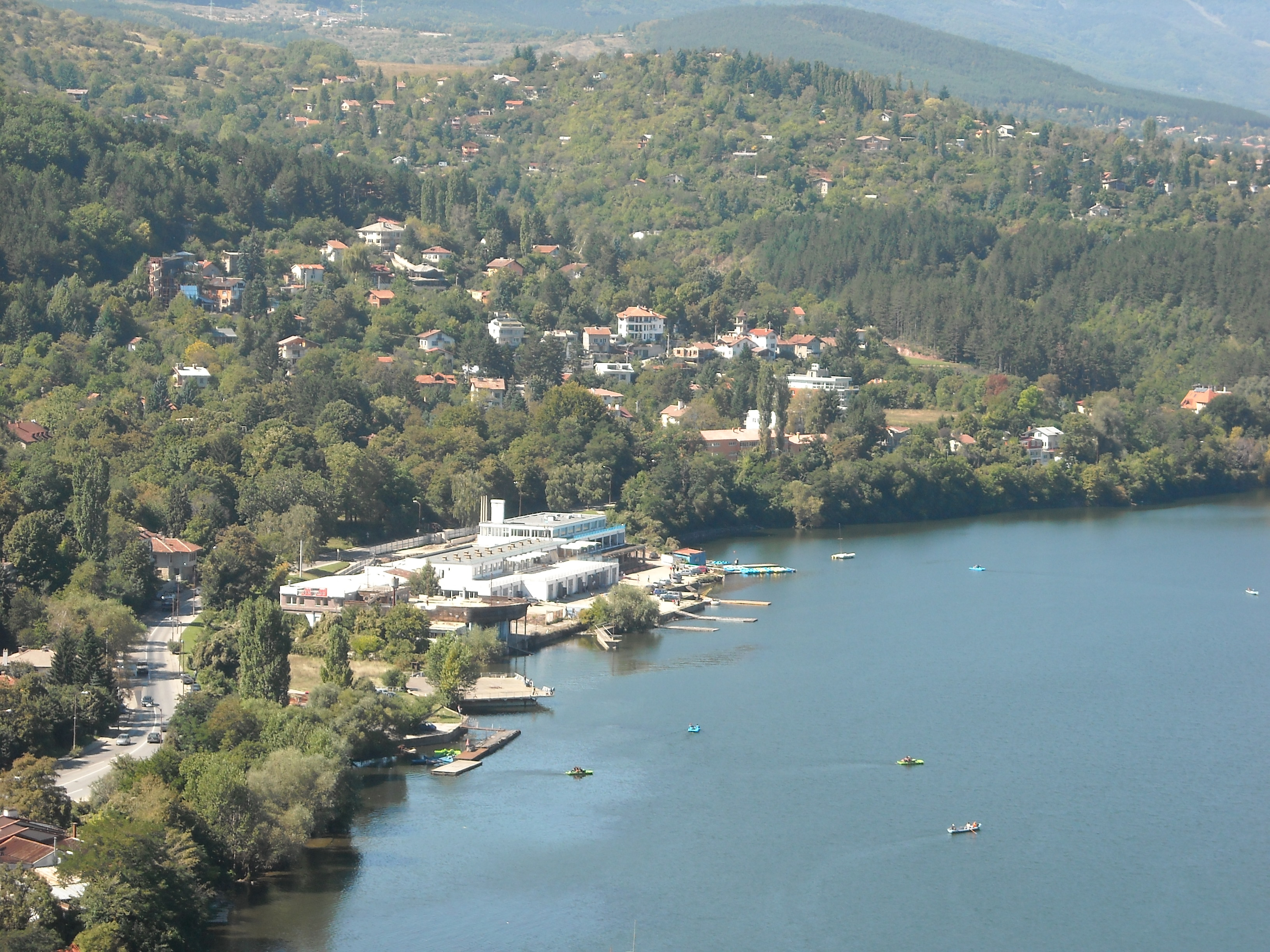
Sredets National Rowing base on the shore of Lake Pancharevo, Sofia

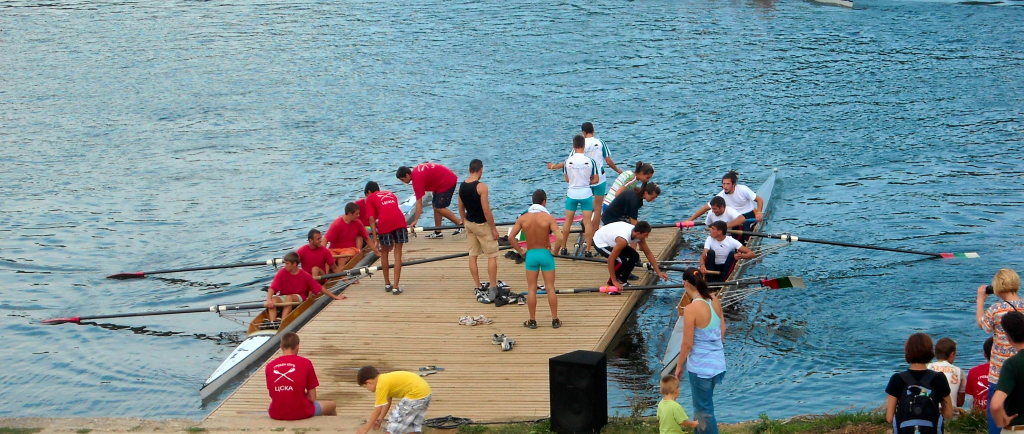
Rowing regatta on Lake Pancharevo

Lake Pancharevo (Панчаревско езеро, Pancharevsko ezero or Язовир Панчарево, Pancharevo Reservoir) is an artificial lake in western Bulgaria, at the end of the Pancharevo Gorge of the Iskar River.

It is located at 600 m above sea level between the mountain ranges of Vitosha and Lozen Mountain, the latter part of the Sredna Gora range. Nearby villages include Lozen, Dolni Pasarel, Gabra and German. It is 15 km from the center of Sofia. its area is about 80 km², 1190,2 m elevation) mountains. Lake Pancharevo is 2,4 km long and up to 700 m wide, reaching a depth of 18 m, and is situated 12 km southeast of the capital city of Sofia, where the Vitoshka Bistritsa flows into the Iskar. The villages of Pancharevo and Kokalyane and the Pancharevo mineral springs lies on the lake's western shore, while at the southern end of the lake there is a hydroelectric power station. Sports centres and catering establishments have been constructed around the lake, making it a favoured outing location for the residents of Sofia. Further upstream in the gorge there are two additional artificial lakes: the Pasarel Reservoir and the Iskar Reservoir.

The lake was created in 1956 in connection with the construction of Hydrohub "Iskar", as a drinking, irrigation and energy source for the Sofia Agglomeration.

The (Sredets) National Rowing Base is located on the shore of Lake Pancharevo. Built in 1968, the rowing base is the first modern facility in Bulgaria, specializing in conducting training and competitions in rowing events. In 1977 it hosted the World Cup canoe in the capital, and in 1981, the World Championships for young people in water sports. Over the years, it has been host to several world championships, national and international rowing regattas, and the European Triathlon Championships.
