= Zheleznishka reka =

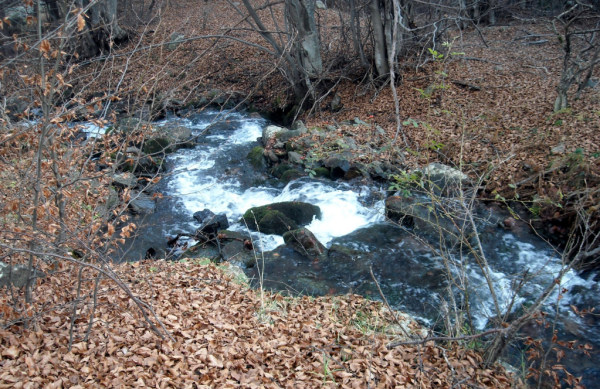

Location
- Country: Bulgaria

Physical characteristics
- Source
  - location: Vitosha
  - coordinates: 42°32′16.08″N 23°18′51.12″E
  - elevation: 1,677 m (5,502 ft)
- Mouth
  - location: Iskar
  - coordinates: 42°33′34.92″N 23°25′23.16″E
  - elevation: 650 m (2,130 ft)
- Length: 11 km (6.8 mi)

Basin features
- Progression: Iskar→ Danube→ Black Sea

The Zheleznishka reka (Bulgarian: Железнишка река) is a river in western Bulgaria, a left tributary of the Iskar. The river is 11 km long and takes its source from the Kazana area on the eastern slopes of the Vitosha mountain range at an altitude of 1,677 m near the summits of Kazana, Golyam Kupen and Belcheva Skala. It flows in eastern direction until the confluence with the Ustruzhki Dol downstream of the village of Zheleznitsa. It then turns northeast. The river is also known as the Selska reka upstream and the Vedena downstream. Its largest tributary is the Egulya, which springs from the Plana mountain range. For about a kilometer along its banks near Zheleznitsa passes one of the main trails in Vitosha Nature Park, which leads to its highest summit, the Cherni Vrah (2,290 m). It its lower course the Zheleznishka reka forms a deep valley, which serves as the orographic boundary between Vitosha and Plana. It flows into the Iskar in the Pancharevo Gorge at the Devil's Bridge near the medieval Bulgarian fortress of Urvich, a starting point of a trail leading to the Kokalyane Monastery and Plana's highest summit Manastirishte (1,338 m).

The Zheleznishka reka flows entirely in Sofia City Province. Near the confluence with the Egulya are located the Zheleznitsa mineral springs with a total discharge of 8 L/sec and temperature of 23–31.7 °С.
