= Dolni Pasarel =

- Village
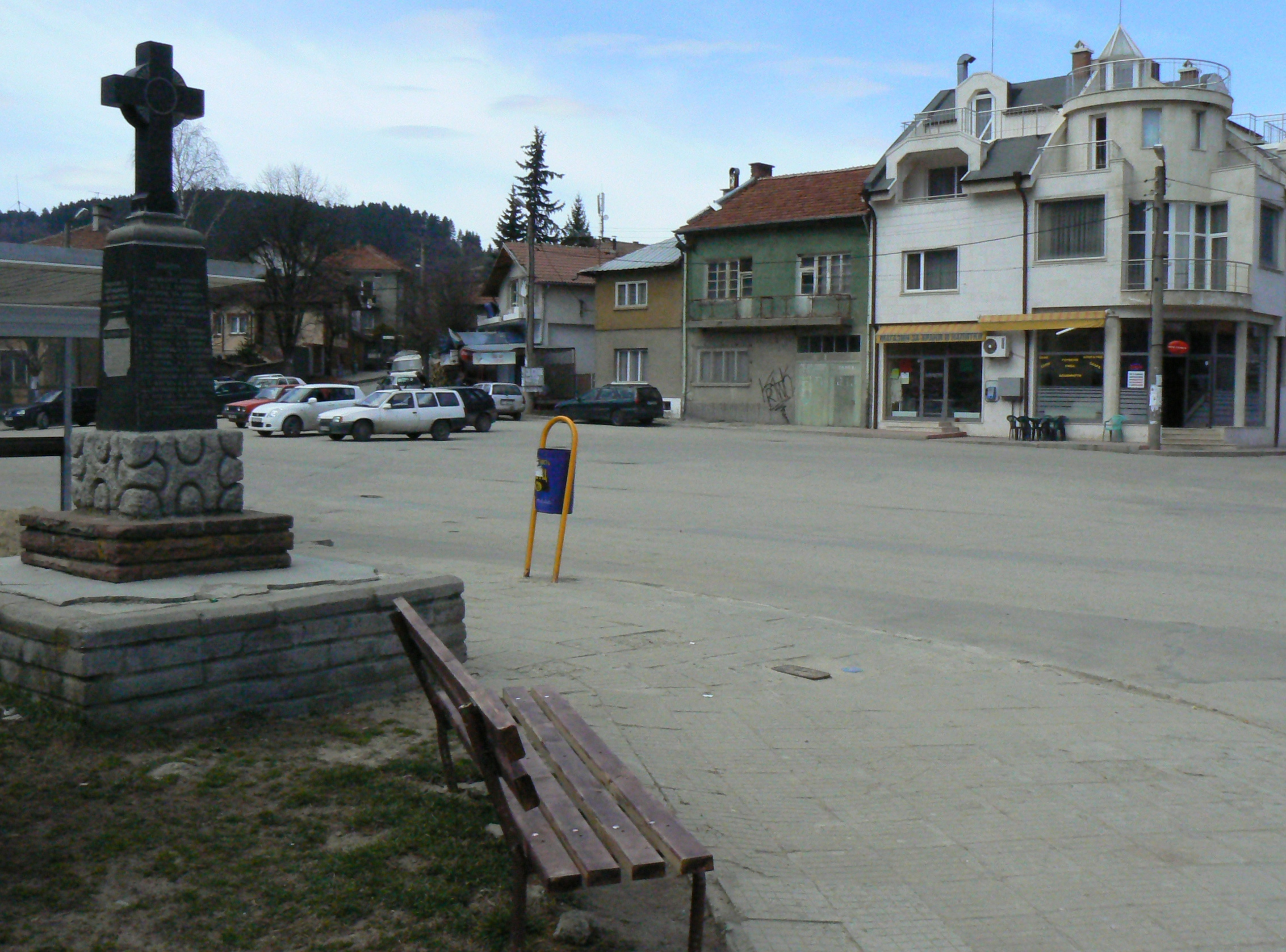

- Location within Bulgaria
- Coordinates: 42°32′0″N 23°30′0″E
- Country: Bulgaria
- Province: Sofia City
- Municipality: Stolichna Municipality
- Elevation: 750 m (2,460 ft)

Population (2024)
  - Total: 1,239
- Time zone: UTC+2 (EET)
  - Summer (DST): UTC+3 (EEST)
- Postal code: 1165

Dolni Pasarel (Bulgarian: Долни Пасарел) is a village in Pancharevo district of the Bulgarian capital Sofia, located some 22 km southeast of the city center. As of 2024 it has 1,239 inhabitants.

== Geography ==
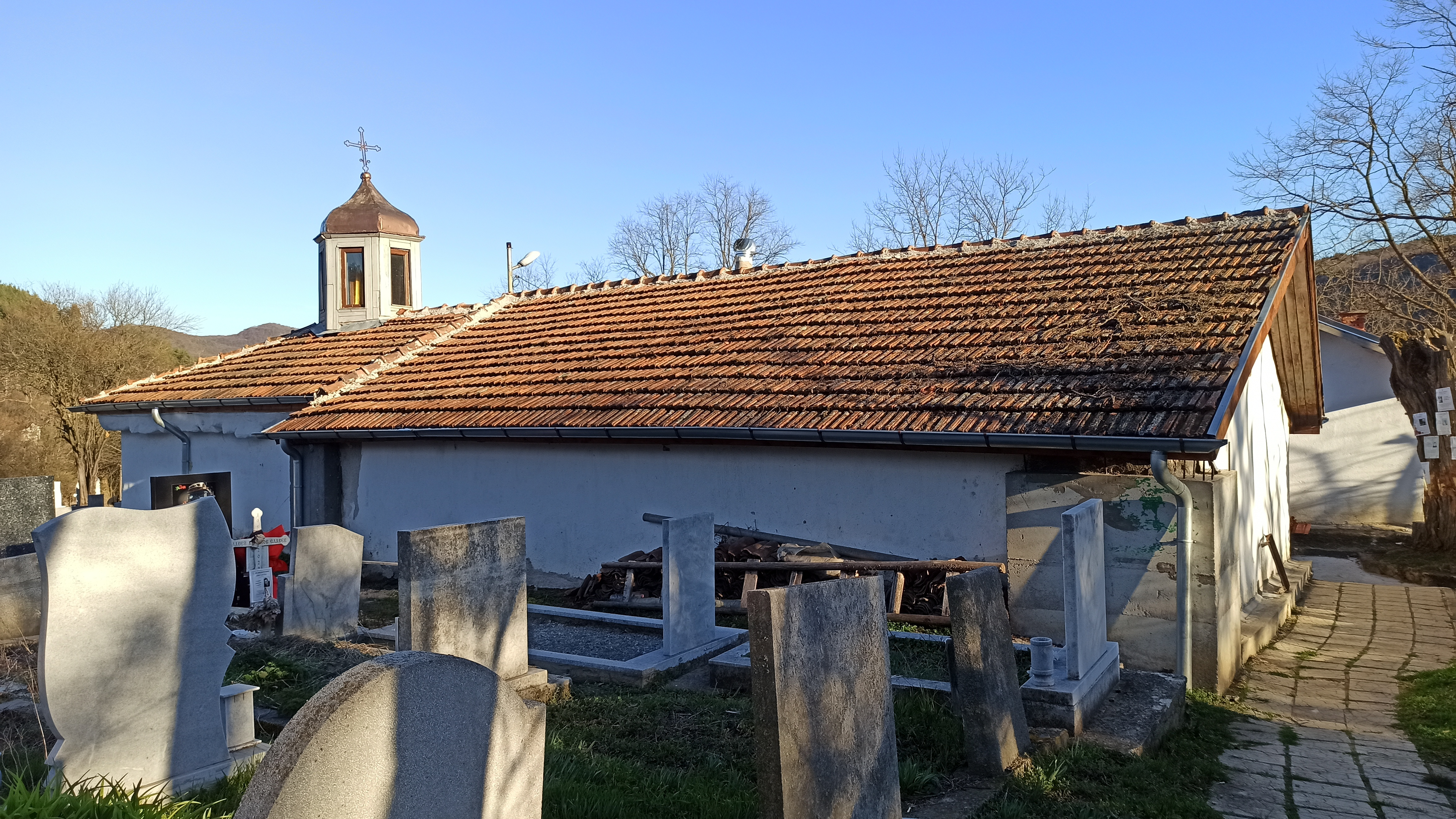
The Church of Saint George

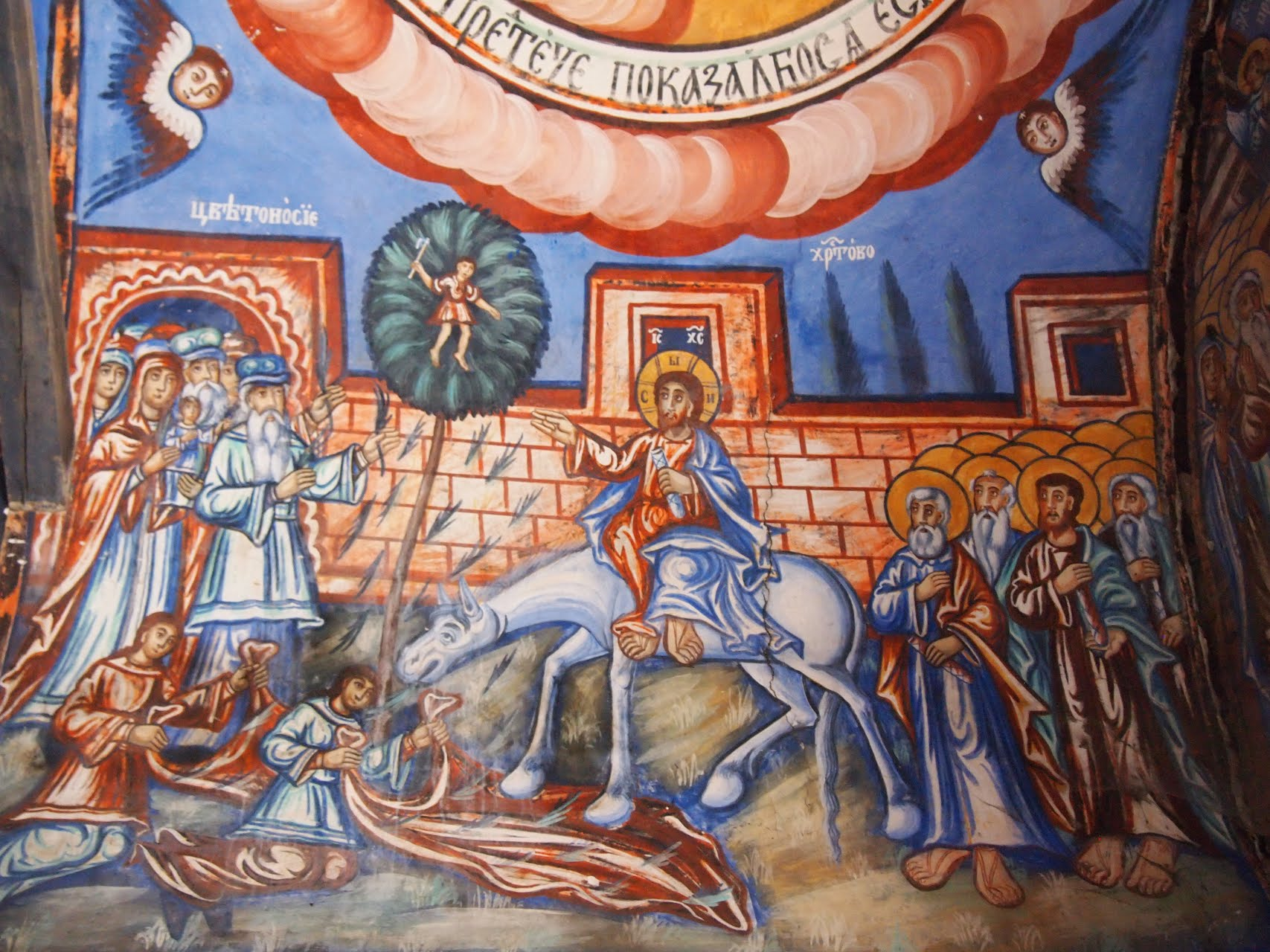
Frescoes from Dolni Pasarel Monastery

Dolni Pasarel is situated at an altitude of 700–750 m on the southern slopes of the Lozen Mountain division of the Sredna Gora range, facing the small Plana mountain range. It lies in the Pancharevo Gorge in a valley widening along the river Iskar, a few kilometers northwest of the dam of the Iskar Reservoir, the largest artificial lake in Bulgaria. Northwest of the village is the small Pasarel Reservoir. The settlement falls within the continental climatic zone. The soils are cinnamon forest.

Administratively, Dolni Pasarel is part of the Pancharevo district of Stolichna Municipality in the southeastern part of the Sofia City Province. It has a territory of 52.345 km^{2}. The closest settlements are the villages of Zheleznitsa to the west, Kokalyane and Pancharevo to the northwest, and Lozen to the north. Dolni Pasarel is located along the second class II-82 road Kostenets–Samokov–Sofia. The village is served by a bus line of the Sofia Public Transport that connects it with Sofia Metro.

== History ==
There are two Thracian mounds in the vicinity of the village. In the late Antiquity and the Middle Ages there were two fortresses around Dolni Pasarel, which rose to prominence during the Second Bulgarian Empire in the 13th and 14th centuries. During the Ottoman rule there was small-scare iron ore extraction. Several years after the Liberation of Bulgaria, in 1883, the village was visited by the Czech historian Konstantin Jireček, who had recorded 117 houses and 723 inhabitants.

Several men from Dolni Pasarel participated in the successful Serbo-Bulgarian War of 1885, including the victorious battle of Pirot; all of them returned alive. During the First and the Second Balkan Wars of 1912–1913, 31 people from the village died serving in the Bulgarian Army. Another 26 were killed during World War I (1914–1918). On 20 December 1943, during one of the raids of the bombing of Sofia in World War II, the Bulgarian pilot Dimitar Spisarevski crashed into an American B-24 four-engine bomber over Dolni Pasarel, leading to the destruction of the enemy aircraft and his own death. In total, two American bombers and three American fighters were shot down in the battle over the village.

== Culture ==
The school in Dolni Pasarel was established in 1872. A kindergarten was opened in 1983. The Church of Saint George dates from the 17th century. The Dolni Pasarel Monastery, established in the 15th century and also restored in the 19th century, is situated in the Pancharevo Gorge some five kilometers southeast of the village. The local cultural center, known in Bulgarian as a chitalishte, was founded in 1929 and is named Prosveta, meaning enlightenment.
