= Plana (mountain) =

Mountain range in Bulgaria

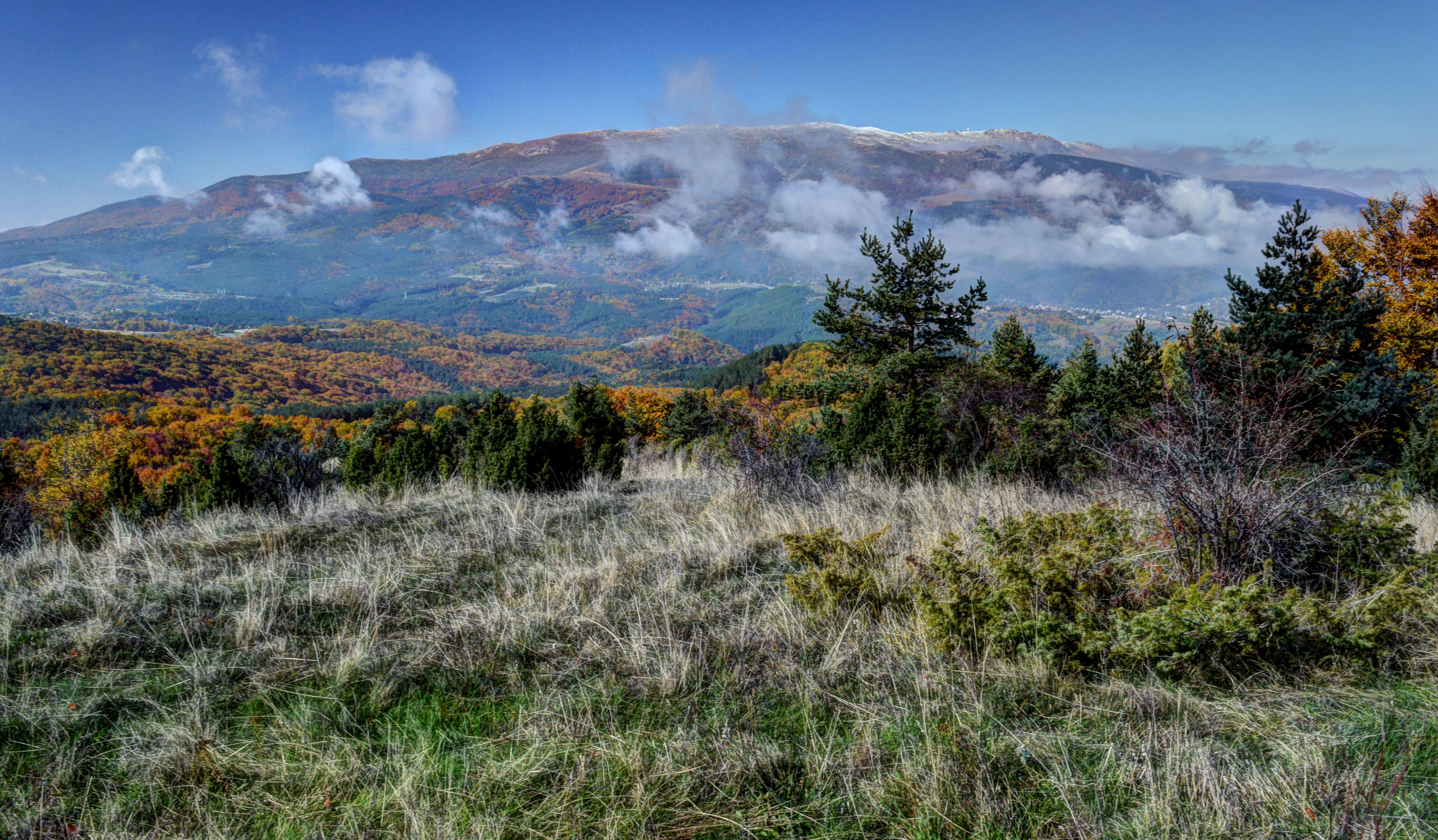
- A view from Plana to Vitosha

Highest point
- Elevation: 1,337 m (4,386 ft)
- Coordinates: 42°31′0″N 23°26′0″E

Naming
- Native name: Плана (Bulgarian)

Geography
- Location within Bulgaria
- Location: Bulgaria

Plana (Bulgarian: Плана) is a mountain range in western Bulgaria with an altitude of 1,337 meters above sea level. It is part of the Srednogorie mountain system that from west to east includes the mountain ranges of Greben, Zavalska Planina, Viskyar, Lyulin, Vitosha, Plana and Sredna Gora. Plana Peak in Tangra Mountains on Livingston Island, Antarctica is named after it.

== Geography ==
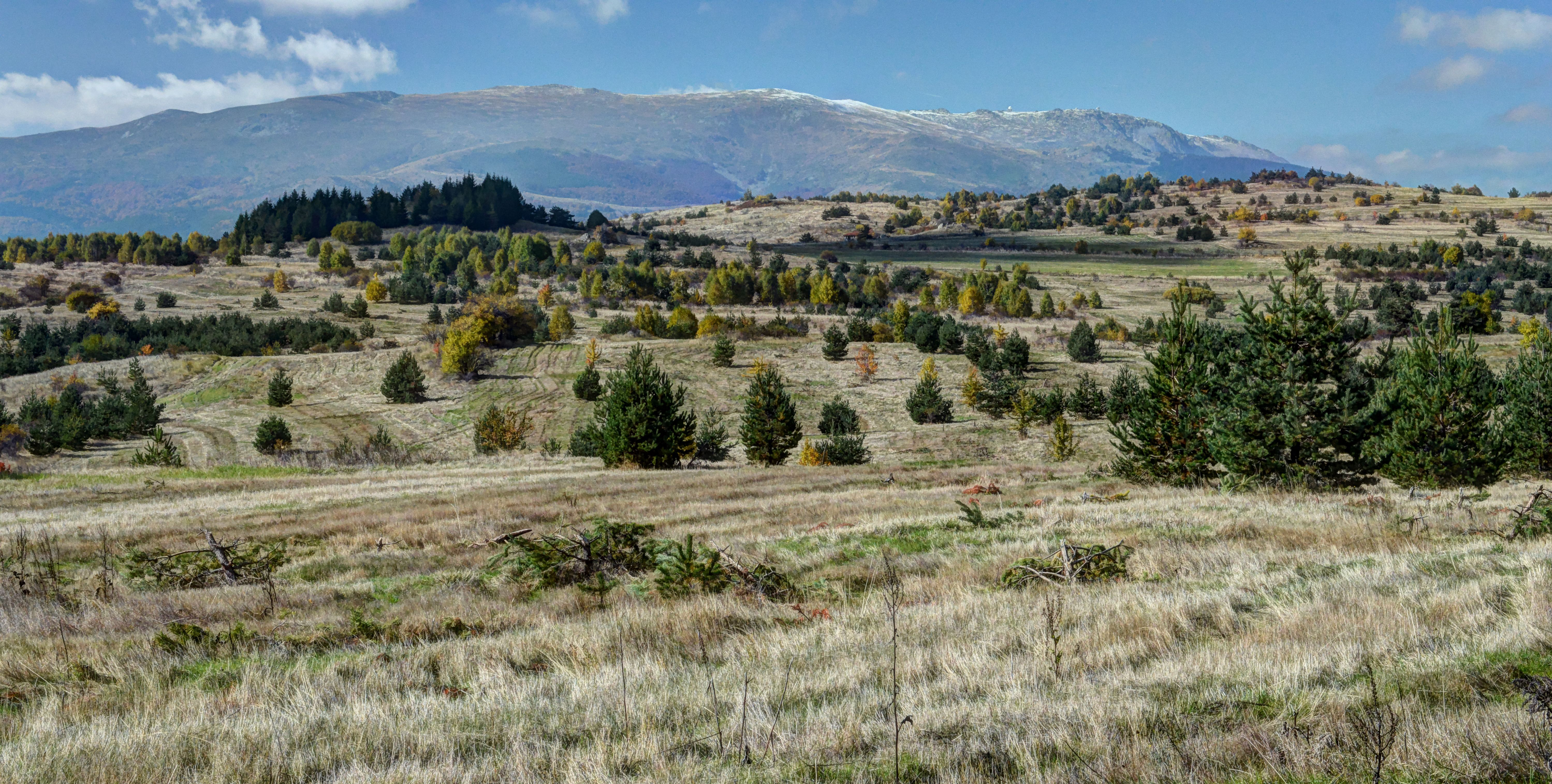
The flat ridge of Plana with Vitosha in the background

To the northeast and east the Pancharevo Gorge and the Iskar Reservoir form the boundary with Lozen Mountain and Vakarel Mountain, which are sub-divisions of Sredna Gora. To the southeast, south and southwest its slopes descend to the Samokov Valley; to the west the Yarema Saddle (1,290 m) links it to Vitosha. Plana has an oval shape, resembling that of the neighbouring Vitosha, with dimensions of 17–20 km. It has an extensive flat ridge that rises to some 1,250–1,300 m asl. The highest summit is Manastirishte (1,337 m), situated in the northern part of the range. Other peaks include Muhchel (1,325 m), Glaveva Mogila (1,315 m) and Vishino Bardo (1,313 m).

Geologically, Plana is a diorite pluton, imbedded among crystalline and sedimentary rocks from the Tertiary period. The climate is temperate continental at lower altitudes and alpine in the highest parts. It is drained by several left tributaries of the river Iskar, including the Palakaria and the Zheleznishka reka. There are mineral springs in the fault zones at Belchinski Bani and Zheleznitsa. The predominant soils are cinnamon and brown forest soils. Plana is covered with deciduous and coniferous forests, as well as pastures.

== Settlements and transport ==
Administratively, the mountain range falls in Sofia and Sofia City Provinces. There are nine villages on its foothills and slopes — Alino, Gorni Okol, Dolni Okol, Kovachevtsi, Plana, Popovyane, Rayovo, Relyovo and Shiroki Dol. Kokalyane Monastery is situated in the northernmost reaches of the mountain on the Pancharevo Gorge, facing the ruins of the medieval fortress of Urvich on the opposite slopes of Sredna Gora.

Plana is served by several roads of the national network. A 30 km stretch of the second class II-82 road Sofia–Samokov–Kostenets runs along the Iskar valley on the northeastern and eastern slopes of Plana between the village of Kokalyane and the villa zone of Mechkata; a 20 km section of the third class III-181 road Sofia–Zheleznitsa–Popovyane traverses its western slopes via the Yarema Saddle; a 9.1 km stretch of the third class III-627 road Samokov–Dolna Dikanya–Radomir runs along the southern foothills between Popovyane and Gorna Dikanya.

== Gallery ==
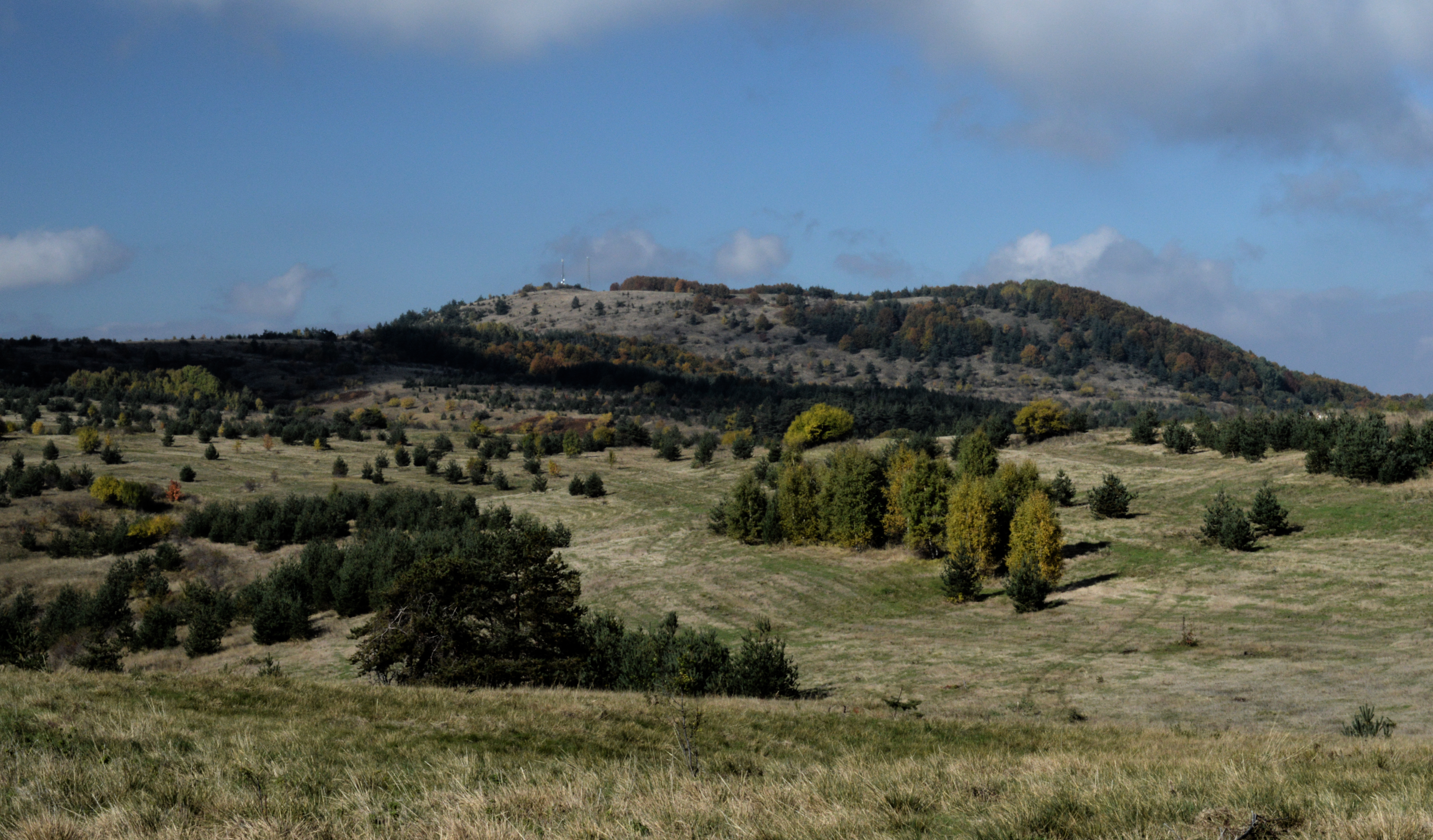
A view of Plana

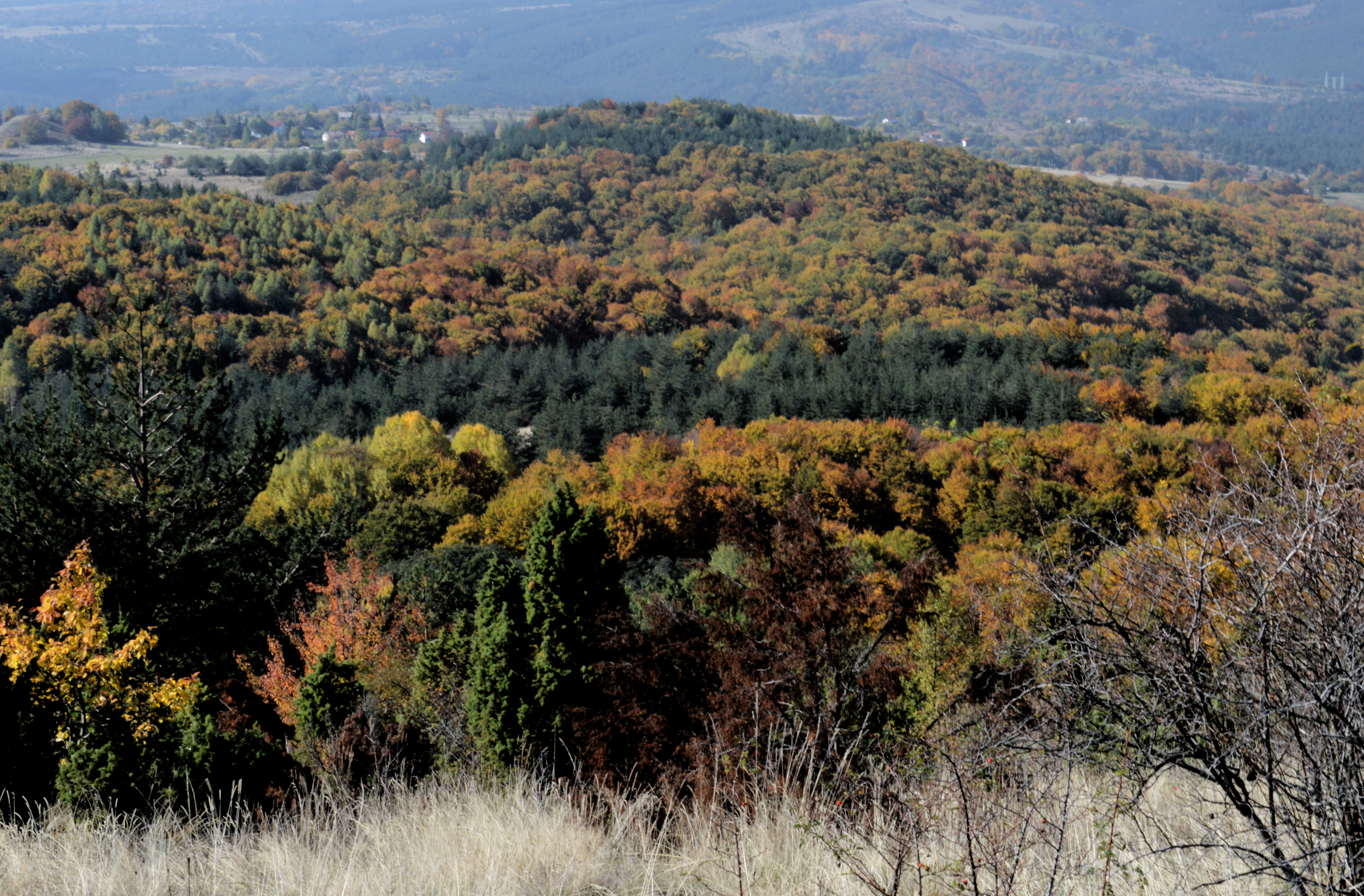
Autumn forest in Plana

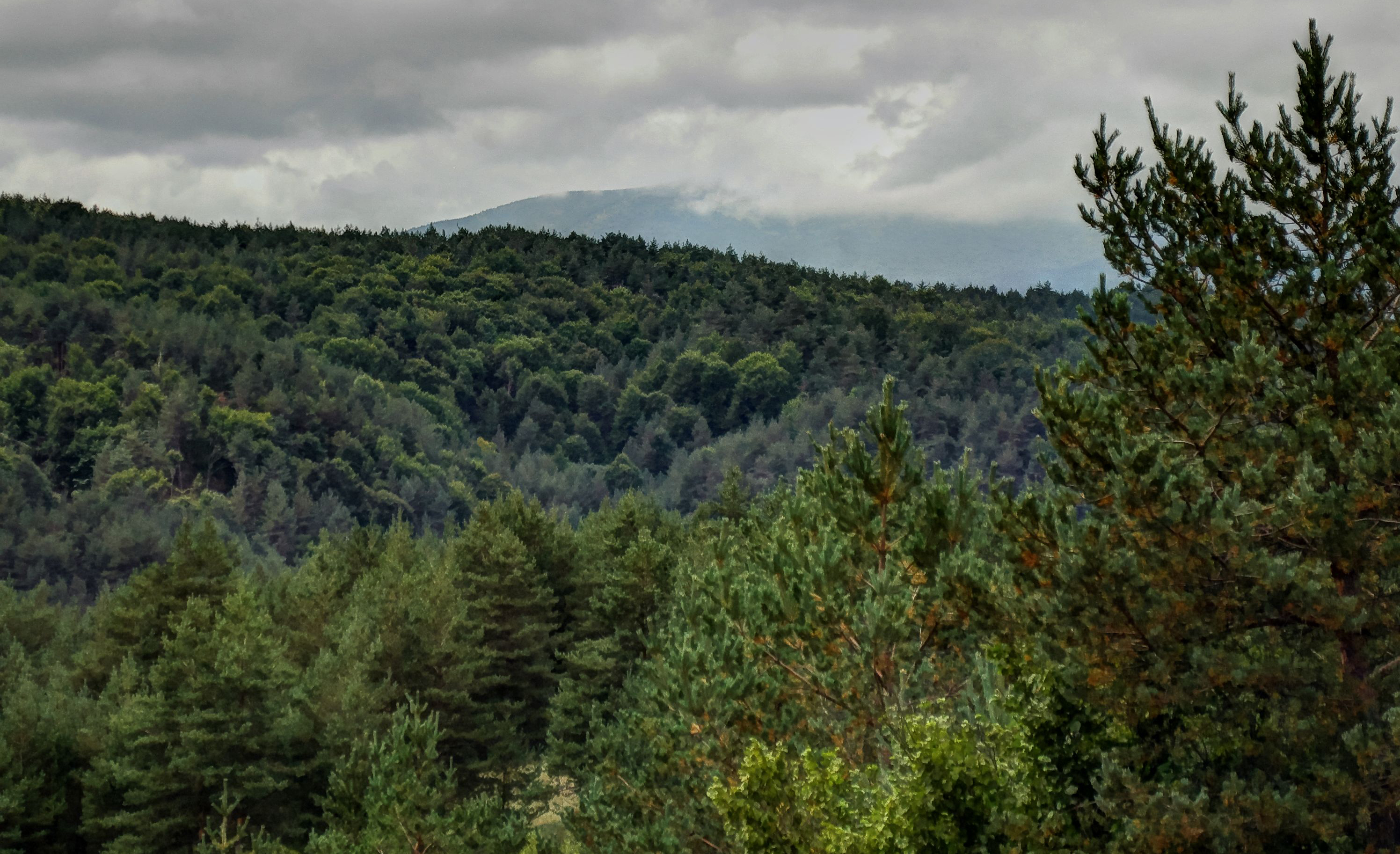
Mixed deciduous and coniferous forest in Plana

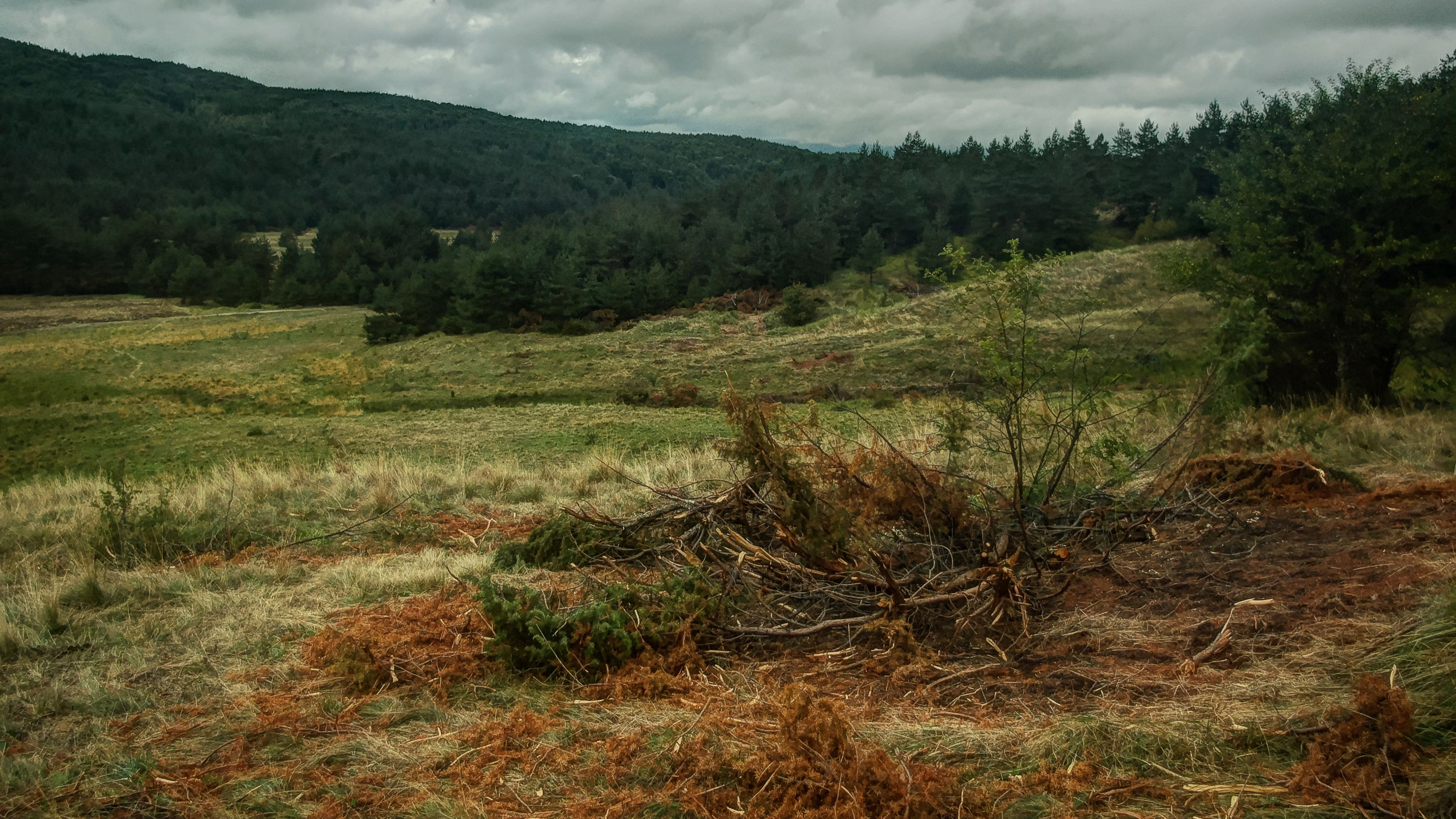
Meadow and forest
