= Dimitar Spisarevski =

Bulgarian aviator (1916–1943)

- Димитър Списаревски
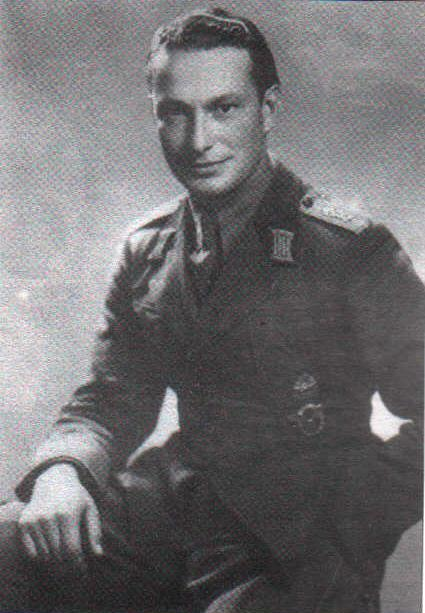
- Captain Dimitar Spisarevski
- Born: July 19, 1916; Dobrich, Bulgaria
- Died: December 20, 1943 (aged 27); Dolni Pasarel, Bulgaria
- Relatives: Kosta Spisarevski (uncle)
- Military career
- Allegiance: Kingdom of Bulgaria
- Branch: His Majesty's Air Troops
- Service years: 1936 – 1943
- Rank: Captain
- Nickname: Spaich
- Conflicts: World War II
- Awards: Cross of Bravery

Dimitar Spisarevski (Bulgarian: Димитър Списаревски) (19 July 1916 – 20 December 1943) was a Bulgarian fighter pilot known for taking down an American bomber by ramming it during the bombing of Sofia in World War II.

Born in Dobrich on 19 July 1916, Spisarevski moved with his family after the post-World War I Treaty of Neuilly ceded the city to Romania, consecutively living in Lom, Belogradchik and Sofia.

Spisarevski entered His Majesty's Military School, but was subsequently expelled and went to serve in Yambol. Due to his excellent conduct, he was called back as a cadet to the school. When a pilot contest was announced, he was among the first candidates for the new subject. Later, he went on to study in Nazi Germany, where he graduated from the fighter pilot school in Werneuchen in 1938. In the summer of 1943, he was sent to the English Channel with another Bulgarian pilot to observe the German pilots and master aerial warfare tactics.

On 20 December 1943, a group of 200 American B-24 Liberator bombers and fighter planes headed to Sofia in order to bomb the Bulgarian capital once again. 36 Bulgarian airplanes took off in order to intercept the bombers before they reached Sofia. Spisarevski was one of the Bulgarian Air Force's Messerschmitt Ме-109G-2 pilots on duty in Bozhurishte who were sent to intercept the bombers before they could reach the city.

According to the battle log of the 3/6 fighter wing, of which Spisarevski was part, the battle went the following way: the American B-24 aircraft flew towards Sofia in V-shaped formations of three, echeloned in a long rear column. The Bulgarians formed an opposing battle row, echeloned in squadrons of four in a rear column, at 6,000 m. The wing had the task to engage the enemy P-38 Lightning fighters while at the same time the other wing, 2/6, would hit the bombers and force them to release their bombs outside the city.

Flying Officer Spisarevski's aircraft failed to start and he took off in a reserve plane with some delay in what would be his first and only aerial battle. When he reached the bombers, the battle had already begun. Spisarevski evaded two American fighters, headed to a group of 16 Liberators and, without ceasing fire, crashed into the leading bomber. The bomber split in mid-air and only the tail gunner survived. Spisarevski's machine crashed at the heights near the village of Dolni Pasarel close to Sofia. His body was found among the debris. The hit American bomber crashed on the other side of the village. For the taking down of a four-engine bomber, he was credited posthumously with three aerial victories and promoted to the rank of captain. Spisarevski was buried in the Central Sofia Cemetery, in the Walk of Pilots.
