= Chanakgyolski Lakes =

Glacial lakes in the Rila Mountains, Bulgaria

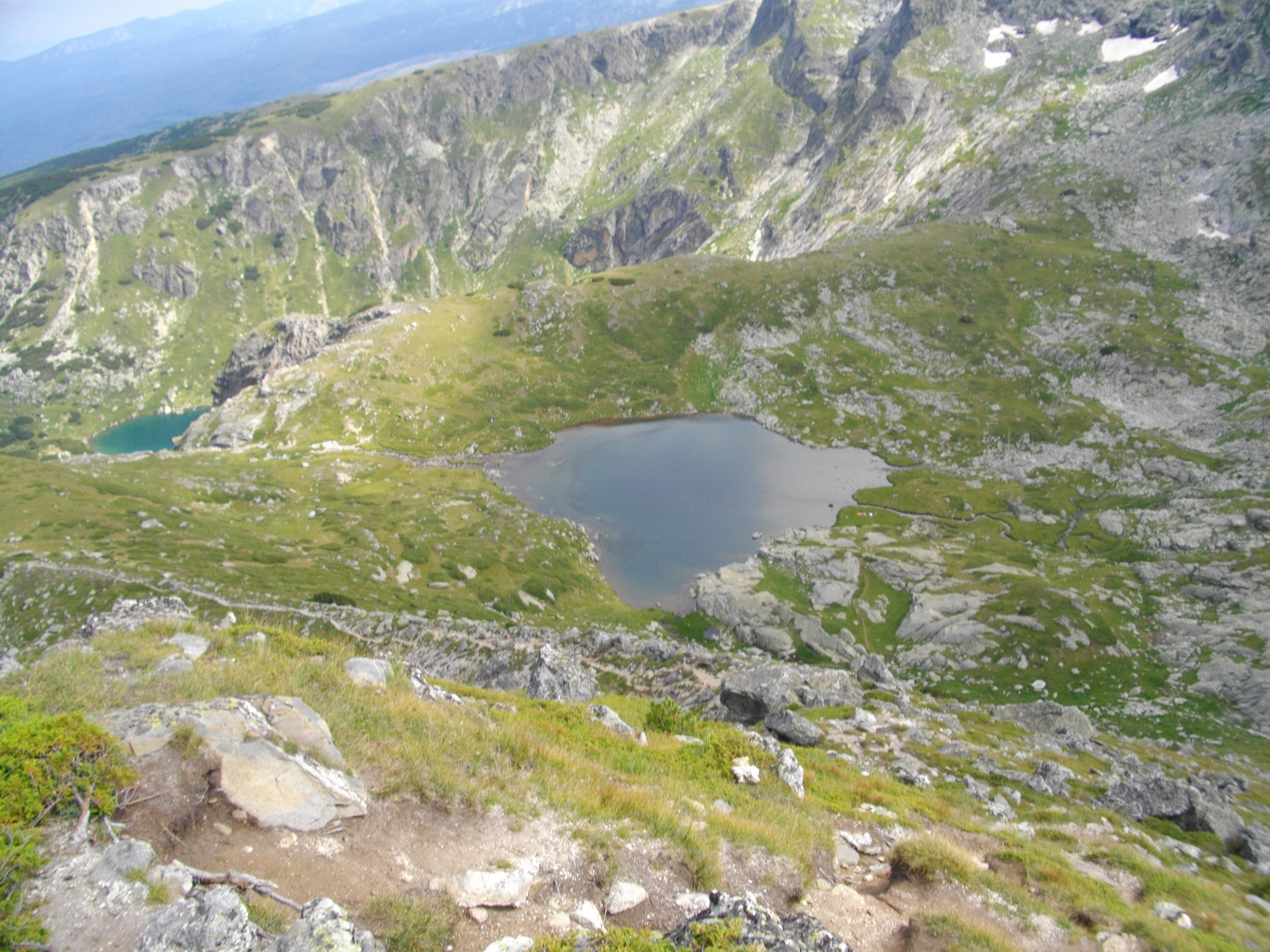
Chanakgyolski Lakes seen from the summit of Haramiyata

The Chanakgyolski Lakes (Bulgarian: Чанакгьолски езера) are a group of two glacial lakes, situated in the northwestern Rila Mountains in Bulgaria, near the Seven Rila Lakes.

They are located in small cirque between Zeleni Rid ridge and the ridge that stems to the north-east of the summit of Haramiyata (2,465 m). The latter forms the watershed between the Aegean and the Black Seas, with the waters to the west belonging to the basin of the river Dzherman, a left tributary of the Struma and those to the east — to the Iskar, a right tributary of the Danube.

The Upper Chanakgyolsko Lake is situated at an altitude of 2,238 m at some 1,490 m to the north-east of the summit of Damga (2,670 m). Covering an area of 10.1 decares, its depth reaches 5.5 m. It is known as the Lake of Purity among the members of the Universal White Brotherhood, who perform the Paneurhythmy dance close to its shores. The larger Lower Chanakgyolsko Lake is situated at an altitude of 2,205 m at some 1,760 m to the north-east of Damga. Its area is 37.5 decares.

The streams originating from the two lakes merge downhills the cirque and form the river Pravi Iskar, which itself flows into Cherni Iskar, the main stem of Bulgaria's longest river.
