= Plana, Bulgaria =

Plana Плана
- Location within Bulgaria
- Coordinates: 42°29′6″N 23°24′35″E
- Country: Bulgaria
- Province: Sofia City
- Established: 22.07.1897

Government
  - Mayor: Vencislav Damyanov

Area
  - Total: 18.41 km^{2} (7.11 sq mi)
- Elevation: 1,250 m (4,100 ft)

Population (Census 2011)
  - Total: 73
  - Density: 0.26/km^{2} (0.67/sq mi)
- Time zone: UTC+2 (EET)
  - Summer (DST): UTC+3 (EEST)
- Postal code: 1475
- Area code: (+359) 02
- Website: Pancharevo Municipality

Plana (Bulgarian: Плана) is a village in Stolichna Municipality, Sofia City Province, Bulgaria.

== Geography ==
Plana is a small village, situated along the Plana mountain ridge at 1200 m. above sea level. It is divided into several neighborhoods - Masova, Kalenderova, Tourmachka, Charshiska, etc.

== History ==
Its population has Aegean root and is composed of settlers from the nearby village Chuypetlovo, located on the south slope of Vitosha mountain. Under the Ottoman rule of Bulgaria, there had been a Turkish farm which was the workplace of a lot of Chuypetlovo villagers. The big distance between the farm and their homes led to them moving closer, domestic workers first, and soon after - agricultural workers who bought the land from the farm for their homes.
