= Urvich =

Medieval fortress in Bulgaria

Coordinates: 42°33′33″N 23°25′29″E

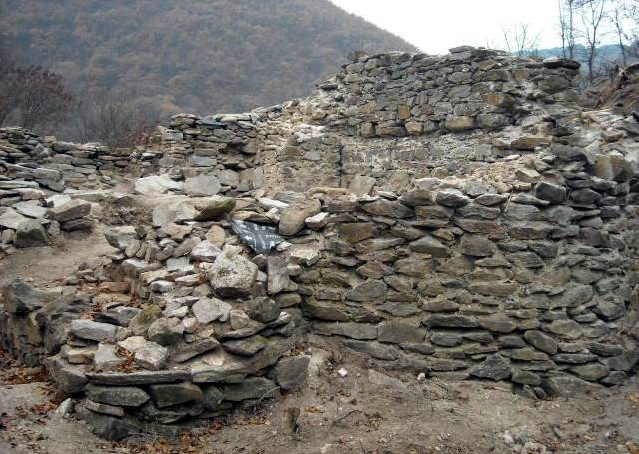
Remains of "St. Elias" Fortified Church in the "Urvich" Medieval Fortress, near Sofia

Urvich (also known as Kokalyane Urvich because nearest village - Kokalyane) is a medieval fortress in the territory of today's quarter Pancharevo, heir to the village of Glavishevo. It is located on the right riverside of Iskar River, in the hill of "Sredobardie", in the Lozen mountain, about 20 kilometres (12 mi) from Sofia downtown on the road to Samokov. In this region there is a river meander, which has been declared a natural landmark.

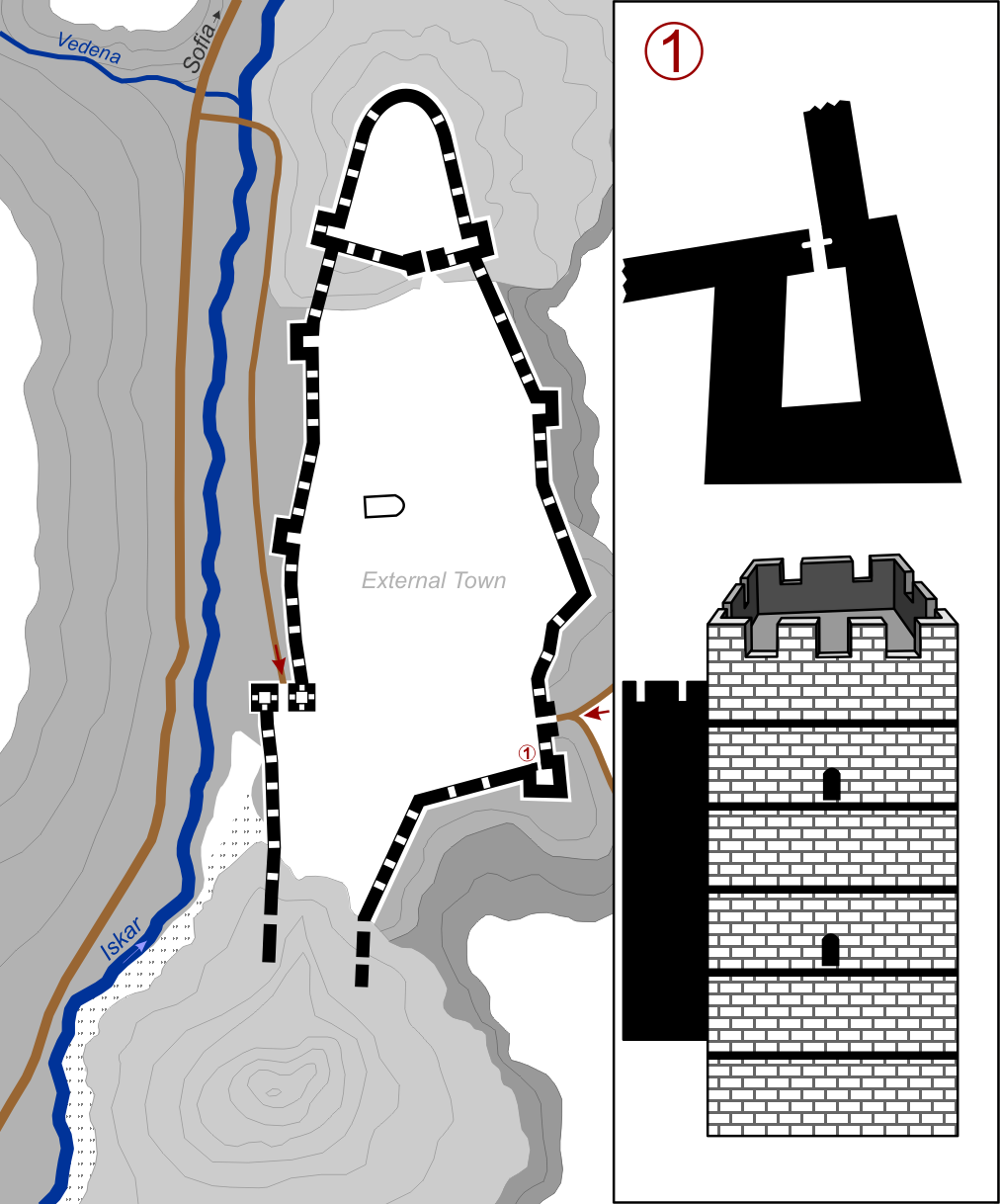
Plan of the medieval Bulgarian fortress Urvich

The fortress was probably built in the 13th century during the Second Bulgarian Empire and its Emperor Ivan Shishman, called by the local population "Jasen" recent battles against the Ottomans. He has led and it is named and scenic road in the foothills of Vitosha mountain - from Boyana, through Bistrica, Pancharevo and Kokalyane, locality of Prosechenik, to the mouth of the estuary river Vedena in Iskar - Yassenov King Road whereby "Urvich" establishes a permanent connection with Vitosha fortresses" of Bistrica and Battil - Boyana. This region is the intersection of Vitosha, Plana and Lozen Mountains, where, at the Devil's Bridge, in the opposite site of Urvich had guard towers and mobile access bridge to the fortress.

Urvich Wall on Livingston Island in the South Shetland Islands, Antarctica is named after the fortress of Urvich.
