= Pasarel Reservoir =

Reservoir in Sofia Province, Bulgaria

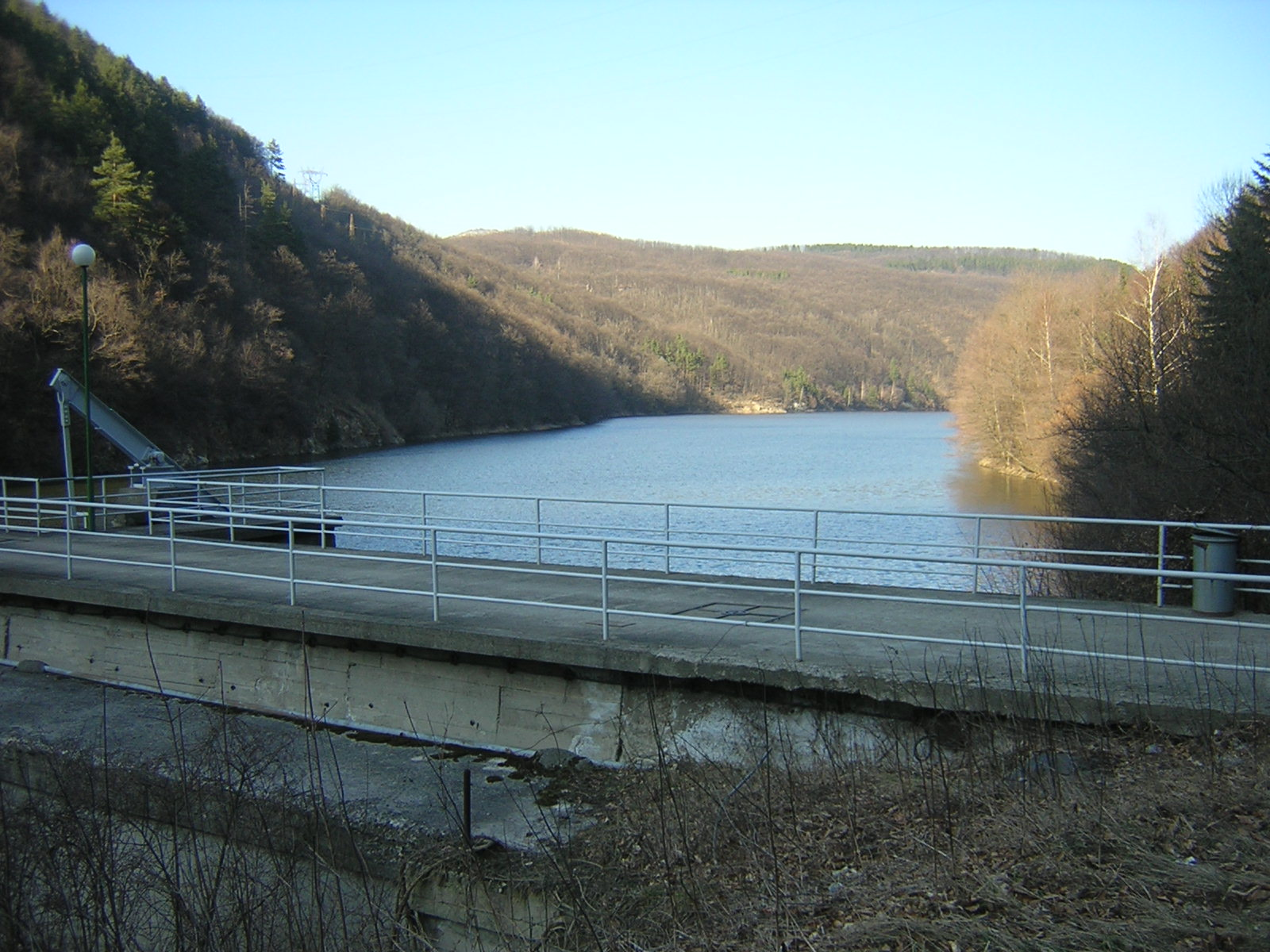
- The reservoir and part of the dam

- Location within Bulgaria
- Coordinates: 42°33′13″N 23°28′44″E
- Lake type: reservoir
- Primary inflows: Iskar
- Primary outflows: Iskar
- Basin countries: Bulgaria
- Max. length: 2,500 m (8,200 ft)
- Max. width: 320 m (1,050 ft)
- Surface elevation: 700 m (2,300 ft)

The Pasarel dam and reservoir is located 20 km to the southeast of Sofia, Bulgaria at an altitude of 700 m.

The dam is situated roughly halfway between the Iskar Reservoir and Lake Pancharevo near the village of Dolni Pasarel. It is a gravity dam. Though built in the Iskar valley, under most circumstances, the primary inflow come from the tailwater of a co-located hydroelectric plant (which is in turn is fed from a long, underground penstock from the Iskar Reservoir.) Likewise, in most cases, the majority of its outflow goes into another long penstock to the hydroelectric plant at the southern end of Lake Pancharevo. The reservoir itself is small (about 1.5 km long and 300 m wide), but still attracts birdwatchers, picnickers and other visitors to the area.

Birds seen here in February include green-winged teal (Anas crecca), mallard (Anas platyrhynchos), and eurasian siskin (Spinus spinus).

Near to the Pasarel dam, in the village of Dolni Pasarel, is located the "St. Peter and Pavel" monastery.
