= Lozen Mountain =

Mountain in Bulgaria

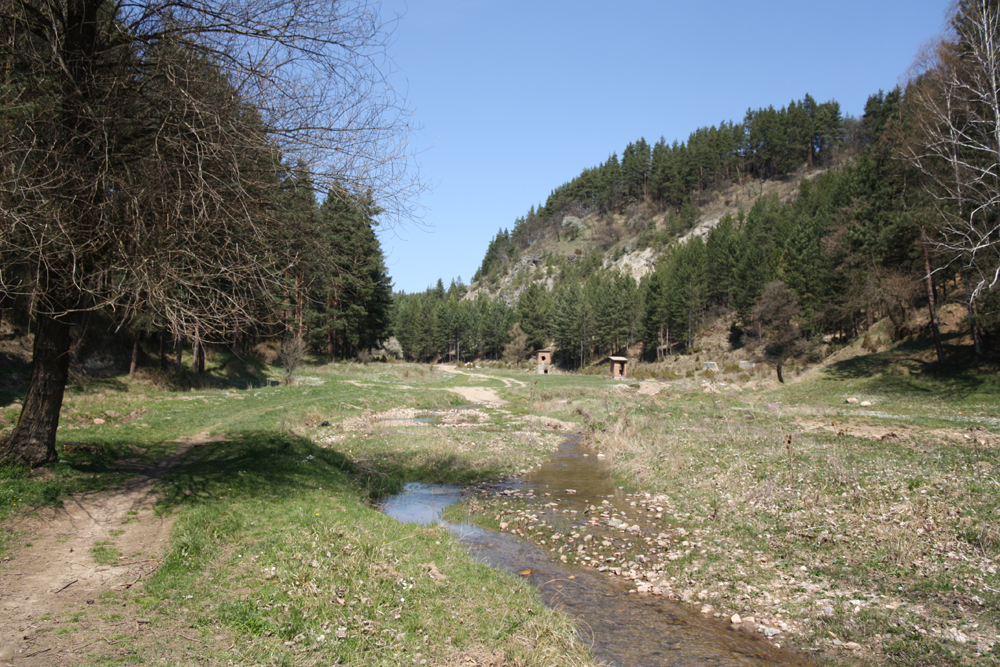

Highest point
- Elevation: 1,190.2 m (3,905 ft)
- Coordinates: 42.561°N 23.597°E

Geography
- Location within Bulgaria
- Location: Bulgaria
- Parent range: Sredna Gora

Lozen Mountain (Bulgarian: Лозенска планина, Lozenska planina) is a small mountain range in Bulgaria. It is at the westernmost end of the Sredna Gora range. To the west, it is separated by the Pancharevo Gorge from the Vitosha and Plana mountains. To the north, its foothills descend into the Sofia Valley. The mountain extends for 15 kilometres (9.3 mi) in an east–west direction, while its width varies between 5 kilometres (3.1 mi) and 10 kilometres (6.2 mi). Its highest point is Popov Dyal, 1,190.2 metres (3,905 ft). It is named after the village of Lozen. It is close to Lake Pancharevo and Sofia.
