= German, Bulgaria =

Village in Bulgaria

German Герман
- Village
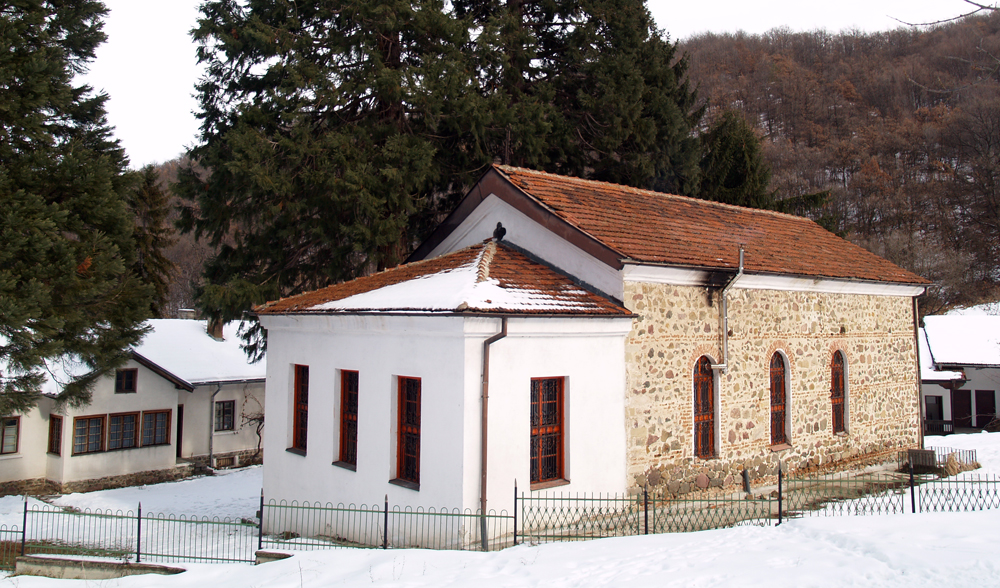
- Monastery of German

- Location within Bulgaria
- Coordinates: 42°37′N 23°25′E

Government
- Elevation: 639 m (2,096 ft)

Population (2015)
  - Total: 2,500
- Time zone: UTC+2 (EET)
  - Summer (DST): UTC+3 (EEST)

German (Bulgarian: Герман [ˈɡɛrmɐn]) is a village in central western Bulgaria, part of Sofia Capital Municipality. It lies at the foot of the Lozen Mountains, at 42°37′N 23°25′E, 639 metres above sea level. As of 2015, it has a population of 2,500 and the mayor is Margarita Stankova.

German is the site of the German Monastery of Saint John of Rila, allegedly founded in the 10th century and then abandoned and reconstructed several times. It features a church from 1885 with frescoes from 1886 by Samokov masters. Since 1928, it is property of the Bulgarian Zograf Monastery on Mount Athos.

Until June 2006, German had a relatively successful football team, PFC Conegliano German, who achieved promotion to the A PFG, the highest division of Bulgarian football. However, after they were promoted, they changed ownership. They left the town and were renamed PFC Chernomorets Burgas Sofia.

The name of the village comes from Patriarch Germanus I of Constantinople, not the country or people of Germany.

This village is not to be confused with the smaller village of Dzherman (Джерман - pronounced "Jerman") near Dupnitsa in Kyustendil Province.

German Peninsula on Fallières Coast in Antarctica is named after the neighborhood.
