= Iskar Reservoir =

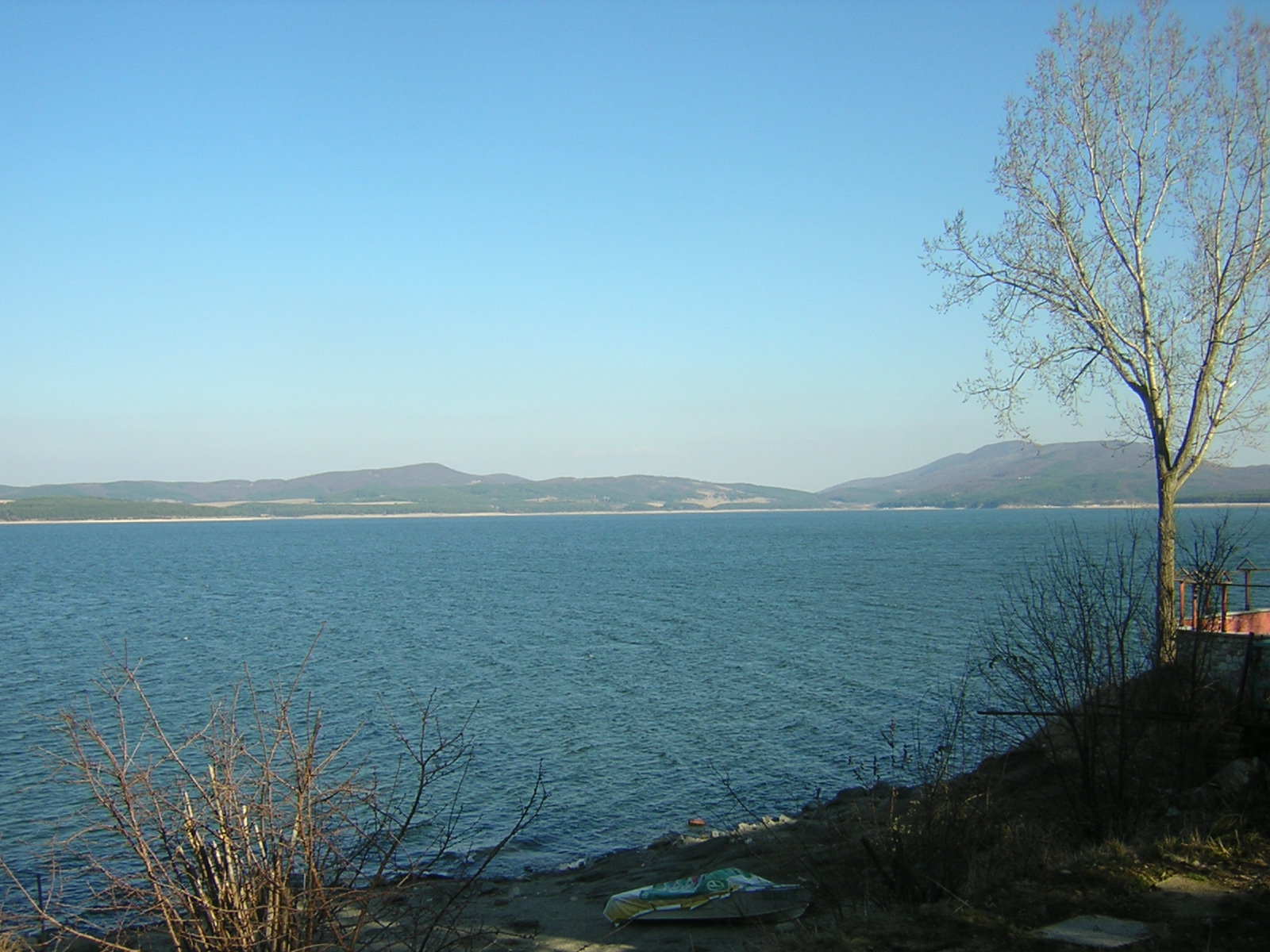

- Location within Bulgaria
- Coordinates: 42°28′14″N 23°34′24″E
- Type: reservoir
- Primary inflows: Iskar River
- Primary outflows: Iskar River
- Catchment area: 1,046 km^{2} (404 sq mi)
- Basin countries: Bulgaria
- Max. length: 10.9 km (6.8 mi)
- Max. width: 3.38 km (2.10 mi)
- Surface area: 30 km (19 mi)
- Max. depth: 75 m (246 ft)
- Water volume: 673 hm^{3} (546,000 acre⋅ft)
- Surface elevation: 820 m (2,690 ft)

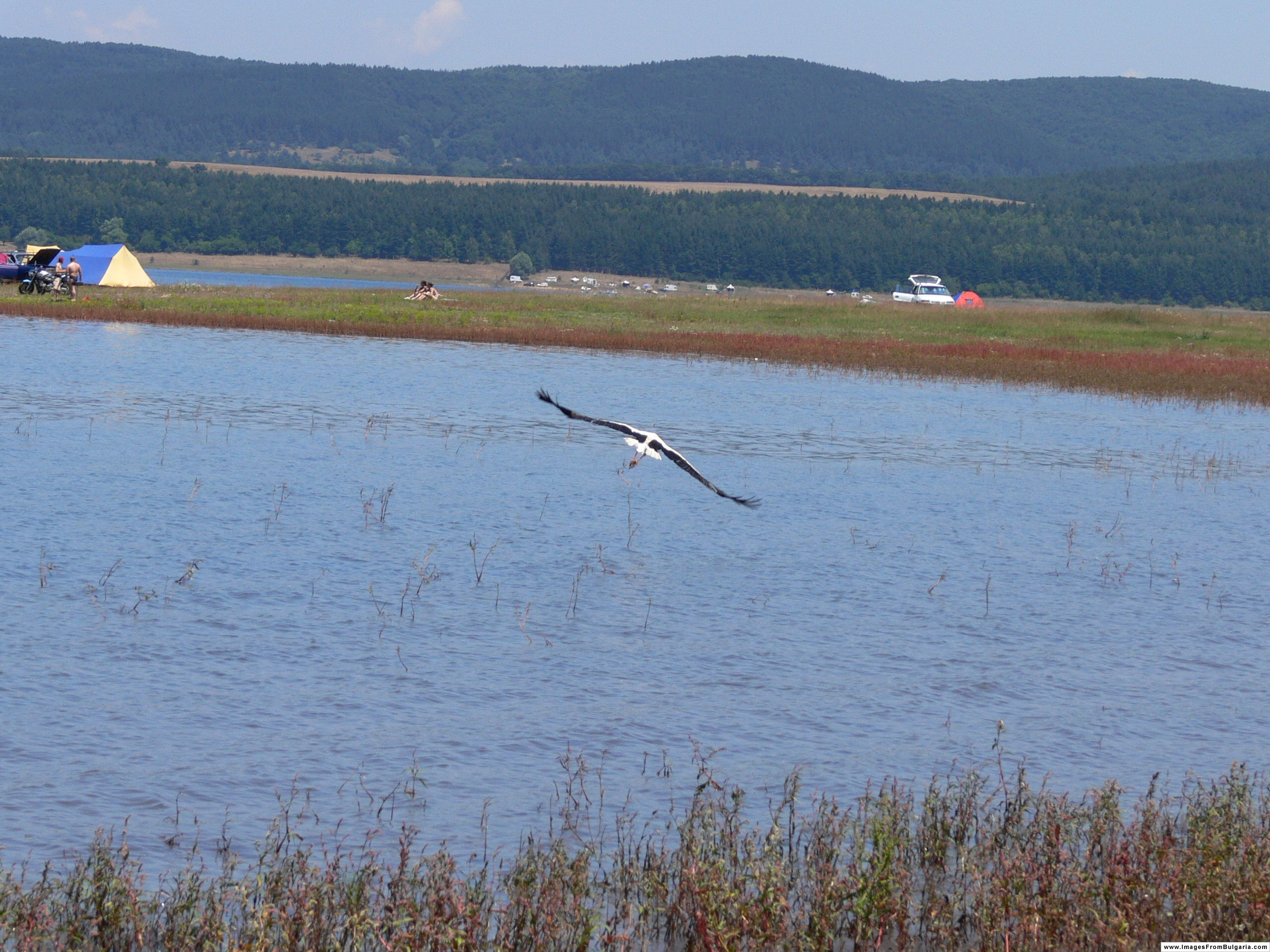
The Iskar Reservoir is a popular weekend destination for the residents of Sofia and the area

The Iskar Reservoir (язовир „Искър“) is the largest reservoir in Bulgaria. Situated on the Iskar River, it provides two-third of the water for the capital Sofia, and also produces hydroelectricity.

The reservoir has a total volume of 673 million m^{3}, of which 580 million are in use and the rest is reserve. The reservoir has a drainage basin of 1,046 km^{2} and is 25 km long. It is situated at 820 m above sea level, its dam being 204 m long and 76 m high.

== History ==
The initial plans for the construction of a dam on the Iskar date to as early as 1900-1901, immediately after the building of the Pancharevo Hydroelectric Power Plant. In 1921, the idea was once again brought up, but its accomplishment failed due to the municipality's inability to indemnify the residents of the neighbouring villages of Gorni Pasarel, Shishmanovo and Kalkovo. Topographic photographs and a geological assessment regarding the dam were made and observations of the Iskar's water level at Pasarel were conducted in 1932-1941 in order to build what was initially called the St Peter's Reservoir (named after the monastery in Dolni Pasarel which was supposed to be near the reservoir).

New geological survey related to the reservoir's construction began in 1947 at four places between Gorni Pasarel and Pancharevo. The place at the Iskar's 37th kilometre was chosen as the most suitable in terms of geology, topography and economics. The waters of the river were further studied between 1947 and 1948.

Work on the projects for an Iskar water power system commenced in early 1948 in the newly established Energohidroproekt. The design and the first draft were created by a team under the engineer Moiseev with the assistance of Soviet specialists. The project was approved by the expert council of the Ministry of Electrification and Melioration, and it was planned that the reservoir had a working volume of 520 million m^{3} and a reserve volume of 60 million m^{3}.

Preparatory works began in 1949, the main construction was carried out in the end of 1950, the water power system being officially opened on 6 September 1954.

When it was under construction, its name was changed to "Giant-Reservoir Stalin" (Гигант язовир Сталин), but later its name was returned to "Iskar Reservoir". There is also the Beli Iskar Reservoir, which is another smaller dam and is located in the upper reaches of the Iskar River.
