= Iskar (river) =

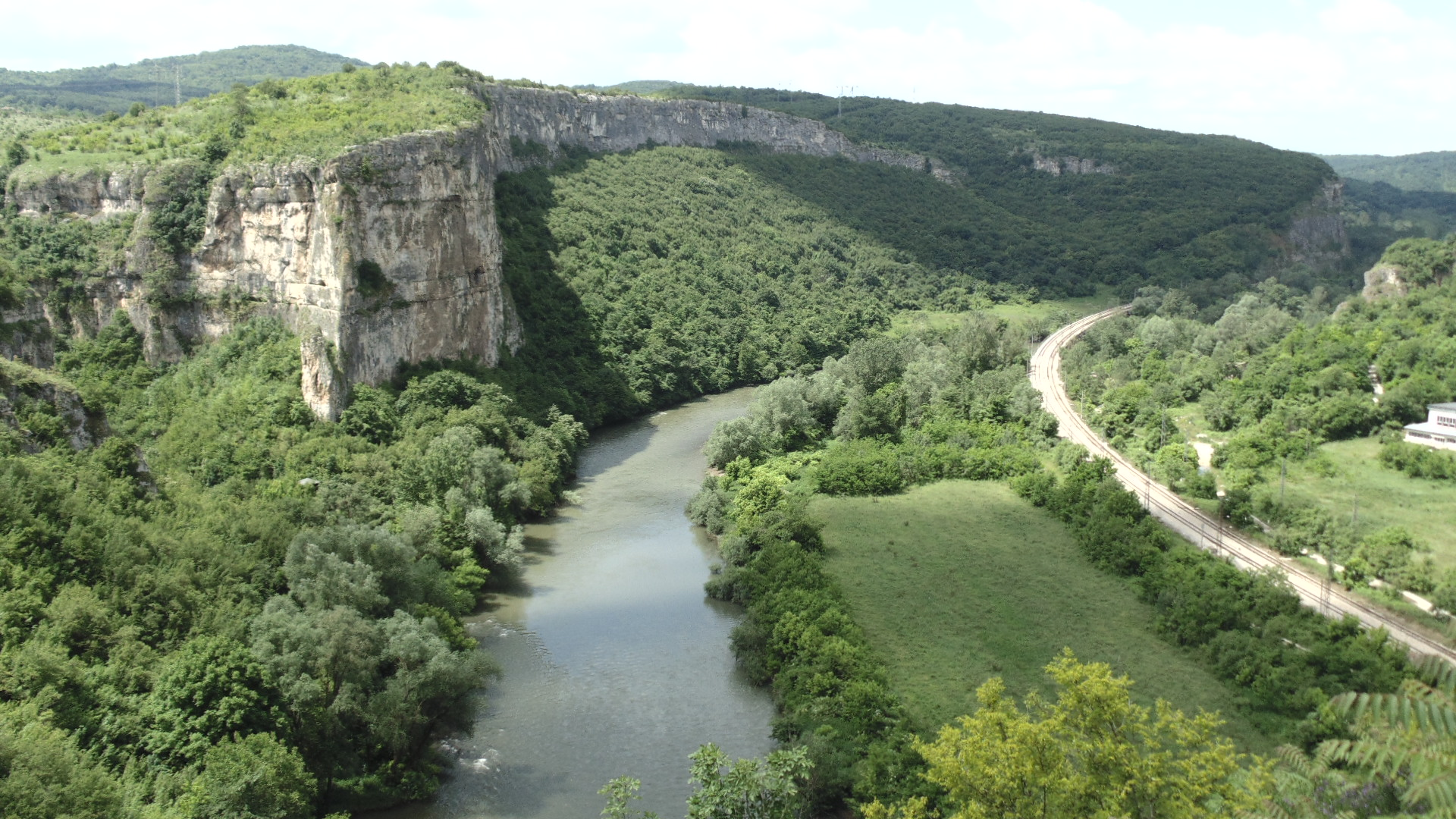
- Iskar near Karlukovo
- Native name: Искър (Bulgarian)

Location
- Country: Bulgaria
- Provinces: Sofia, Sofia City, Vratsa, Lovech, Pleven
- Cities: Samokov, Sofia, Svoge, Mezdra

Physical characteristics
- Source: Damga Peak
  - location: Rila Mountains, Sofia Province
  - coordinates: 42°11′40″N 23°19′50″E
  - elevation: 2,500 m (8,200 ft)
- Mouth: Danube River
  - location: north of Gigen, Pleven Province
  - coordinates: 43°43′56″N 24°26′29″E
  - elevation: 25 m (82 ft)
- Length: 368.0 km (228.7 mi)
- Basin size: 8,617 km^{2} (3,327 sq mi)
- Discharge
  - average: 54 m^{3}/s (1,900 cu ft/s)

Basin features
- Progression: Danube→ Black Sea

The Iskar (Bulgarian: Искър, pronounced [ˈiskɐr]; Latin: Oescus) is a right tributary of the Danube. With a length of 368 km, it is the longest river that runs entirely within Bulgaria. Originating as three forks in the Balkans' highest mountain range Rila, the Iskar flows in a northern direction until its confluence with the Danube. As it flows northwards it fuels the largest artificial lake in the country, the Iskar Reservoir, forms the divide between the Vitosha and Plana Mountains in the west and the Sredna Gora mountain range in the east before entering the Sofia Valley, which contains the nation's capital Sofia. From there the Iskar runs through the Balkan Mountains, forming the spectacular 84 km long Iskar Gorge. As it crosses the mountains, its water course turns in a north-eastern direction at Lakatnik. North of the Balkan Mountains, the river crosses the Danubian Plain and finally flows into the Danube between the villages of Baykal and Gigen. Geologically, Iskar is the oldest river in the Balkan Peninsula.

Its watershed drains 8,617 km^{2} in the provinces of Sofia, Sofia City, Vratsa, Lovech and Pleven. The Iskar flows through nine towns and numerous villages. The Iskar river basin is home to more than 50 species of fish, including Cottus haemusi that is endemic to the upper Iskar and Vit drainages.

The Iskar has a significant economic importance, providing water for the needs of the capital and a number of manufacturing plants. Its waters are also utilised for irrigation and electricity generation, while the scenic gorges and rock formations throughout its course provide excellent conditions for recreation. Although the Iskar is not navigable its valley is very important for transportation, especially along the Iskar Gorge, which is one of the only three passes in the Balkan Mountains crossed by a railway.

== Overview ==
The Iskar is 368 km long, which makes it the longest river that runs entirely within the territory of Bulgaria. The Danube and the Maritsa rivers are both longer but they also flow through other countries. The Iskar is a tributary to the Danube and forms part of the Black Sea river basin. It is the only river that takes its source in southern Bulgaria and flows north through the Balkan Mountains that form the water divide between the basins of the Black Sea to the north and the Aegean Sea to the south. In terms of geology, the Iskar is the oldest river in the Balkans and also the only one to have preserved its original direction despite the significant geological changes in later stages. The Iskar basin spans a territory of 8,646 km^{2} in six Bulgarian provinces, Sofia, Sofia City, Vratsa, Lovech and Pleven, with a total population of about 1,600,000 people. The most significant right tributaries from south to north are the Lesnovska reka (65 km), Malki Iskar (85 km) and Zlatna Panega (50 km); the largest left tributaries are the Palakaria (39 km), Vitoshka Bistritsa (12 km) and Perlovska (31 km). Its average discharge at the mouth is 54 m^{3}/s (1,900 cu ft/s).

== Course ==
=== Upper course ===
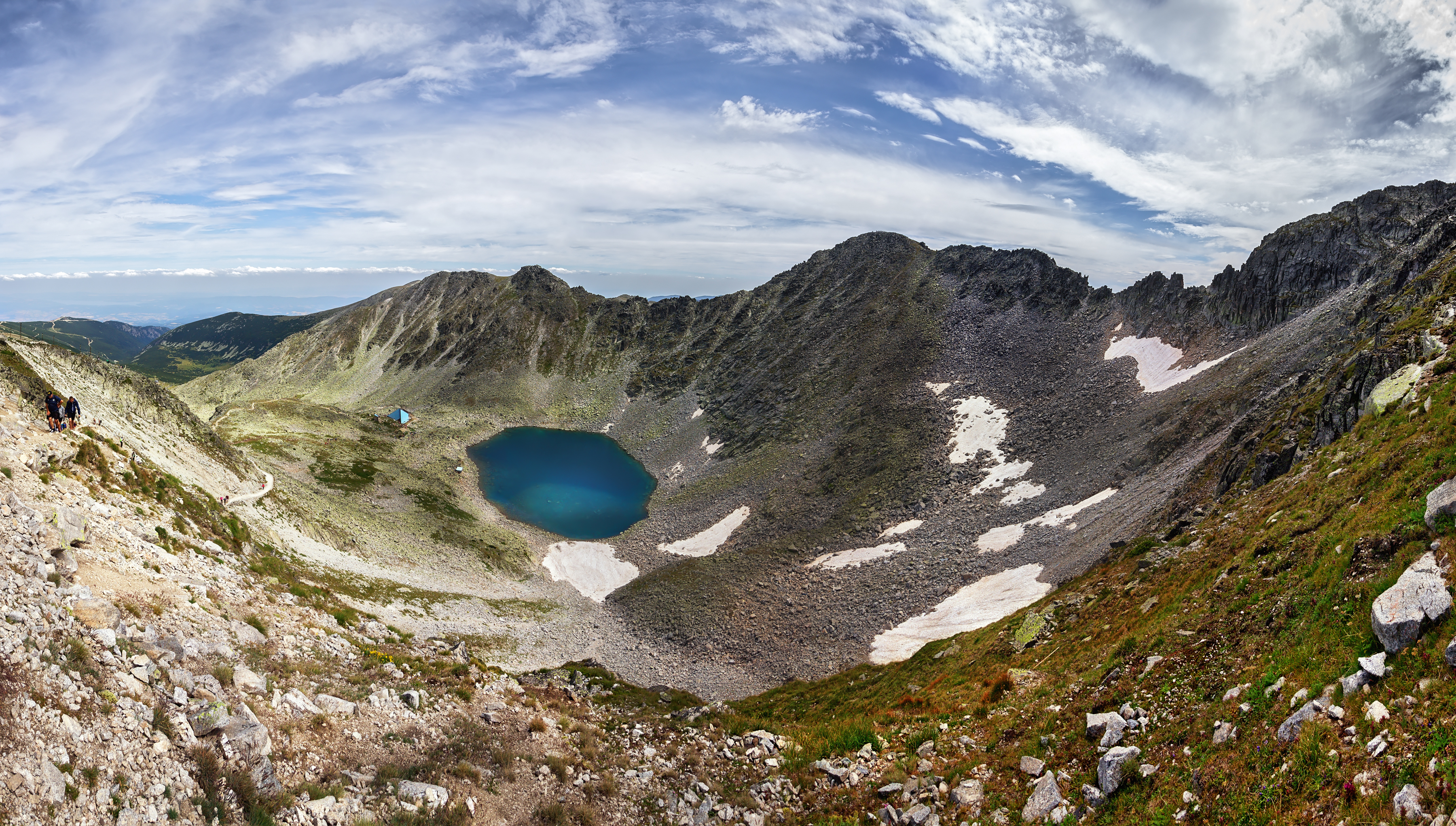
One of the glacial Musala Lakes in the Rila mountains that feeds the uppermost tributaries of the Iskar

The Iskar headwaters consist of three forks in the northern slopes of Rila, Bulgaria's highest mountain range. The 23 km long Cherni (black) Iskar is considered the main stem of the river. It takes its source from the Chamovsko Lake (2,500 m) to the north-east of the summit of Damga (2,669 m) and from there the river flows in north-eastern direction through the Govedartsi Valley, fuelled by the waters of the Chanakgyolski, Malyovishki and Urdini Lakes. Cherni Iskar's discharge at Goverdartsi is 1.60 m^{3}/s; its basin covers 237 km^{2}. Beli (white) Iskar is the longest of the three with a length of 28 km and its springs are at the northern slopes of the Redzhepitsa Peak (2,677 m). It forms a deep and steep valley and has a basin of 91 km^{2}. One of its tributaries, the Musalenska Bistritsa, takes its beginning from the Musala Lakes under the slopes of Musala (2,925 m), the highest summit of the Balkan Peninsula. In its upper course at an altitude of 1,900 m is located the Beli Iskar Reservoir, constructed between 1939 and 1945, that powers a small 16 MW hydro power station. Levi (left) Iskar is the smallest of the three and has its origins at the northern slopes of the Marinkyovistsa Peak (2,636 m). It flows through a deep valley for 18 km until its confluence with Cherni Iskar downstream of the village Mala Tsarkva and has a watershed of 56 km^{2}.

Iskar proper is formed by the confluence of Beli and Cherni Iskar and remains a typical mountain turbulent river with very large inclination and dragging force before entering the Samokov valley at an altitude of 950 m. It flows through the town of Samokov and is joined by its first significant left tributary, the Palakaria a few kilometres to the north. As it emerges out of the valley the river fills the Iskar Reservoir, the largest artificial lake in Bulgaria. Downstream of the dam the Iskar flows in north-western direction and forms the 22 km long Pancharevo Gorge that divides the Vitosha and Plana Mountains in the west and the Sredna Gora mountain range in the east. There it fills the Pasarel Reservoir and Lake Pancharevo.

=== Middle course ===
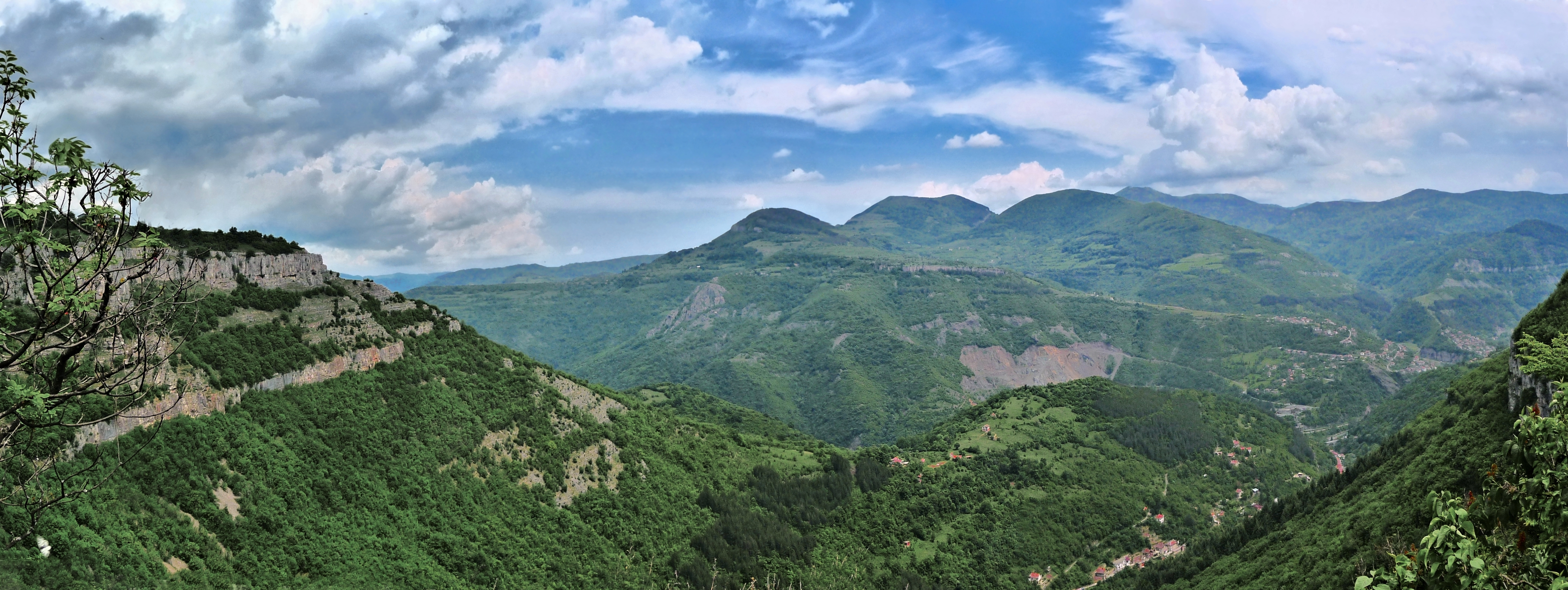
Panoramic view of the Iskar Gorge

The middle course of the Iskar takes its beginning at the village of German. As it enters the Sofia Valley (550 m) at the aforementioned village it turns northwards and forms a wide river bed. There the river flows through the easternmost suburbs of the national capital Sofia and is crossed over by the runway of Sofia International Airport. In the southern parts of the valley the Iskar has an inclination of 6.7‰ that decreases to 0.06‰ in the northern reaches of the valley near the town of Novi Iskar. Upstream in Sofia Valley the sediment that the Iskar carries consists mainly of rough gravel while downstream it is mainly sand.

The river enters the Balkan Mountains at the town of Novi Iskar and forms a long and spectacular gorge, whose slopes reach a height of 200 m up to 500 m at some points. The Iskar Gorge reaches a length of 70 km between its beginning at Kurilo, a neighbourhood of Novi Iskar, and the village of Lyutibrod which marks its end. The river flows north through much of the gorge but at Lakatnik it forms a right turn and starts flowing eastwards. Up to Gara Bov the Iskar flows through very eroded rocks and the gorge is wide with better developed and preserved river terraces. These terraces have formed during the Quaternary and can be 110 to 120 m high. Upstream the river runs through mesozoic limestone, which makes the gorge narrow and even canyon-like at places. At the very beginning of the gorge to Rebrovo the inclination of the Iskar is only 0.75‰ and it flows slowly, forming meanders and even islets. However, the inclination soon increases to an average of 4.1‰ and the flow quickens, forming a narrow and carved river bed.

At Lyutibrod the Iskar enters the Pre-Balkan hills where it forms its fourth gorge with a length of 64 km. The inclination is 2.59‰ on average between Lyutibrod and the town of Roman, and 1.38‰ between Roman and Chomakovtsi. At Karlukovo the river once again turns its course in northern direction.

=== Lower course ===
The lower course begins from the village of Chomakovtsi, where it leaves the pre-Balkan mountains and enters the Danubian Plain. From there the Iskar once again flows in north-eastern direction until its confluence with the Danube. In this section the valley of the river is hollowed into the loess sediments of the Danubian Plain. The valley is wide but narrowed by the valleys of neighbouring valleys of the rivers Vit to the east and Skat to the west. The right margins of the lower Iskar valley are higher and steeper than the left. In the past, the riverbed was carved into an alluvial bottom and due to the small inclination the river used to form meanders with swampy banks. Nowadays the Iskar flows in a corrected riverbed during the last about 17 km until it reaches the Danube. The riverbeds of some of its tributaries such as Blato, Stari Iskar and Kakach Kriva river have also been adjusted. The confluence with the Danube is situated at an altitude of 25 m, at 3 km to the north-east of the village of Baykal and to the west of the village of Gigen.

== Protected areas ==
There are several protected areas that include parts of the Iskar river. The headwaters of the river it its uppermost course fall within the territory of Rila National Park, the largest one in Bulgaria. The European Union network of nature protection areas Natura 2000 includes several protected areas along the river, such as the section of the Pancharevo Gorge under the code Plana BG0001307 and the lower course of the Iskar in the vicinity of the town of Dolni Dabnik under the code Iskar River BG0000613.

== Ecology ==
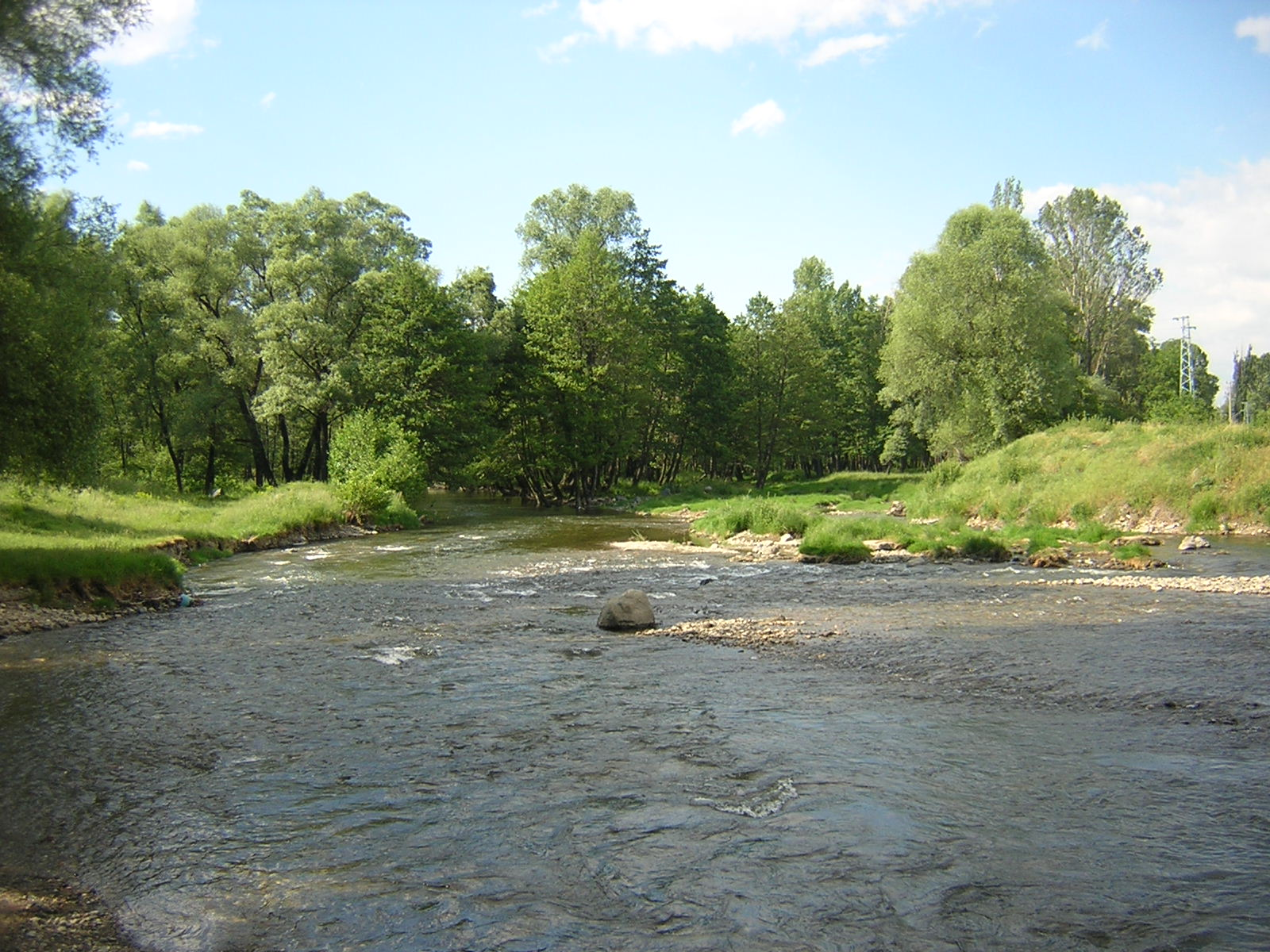
The Iskar near German

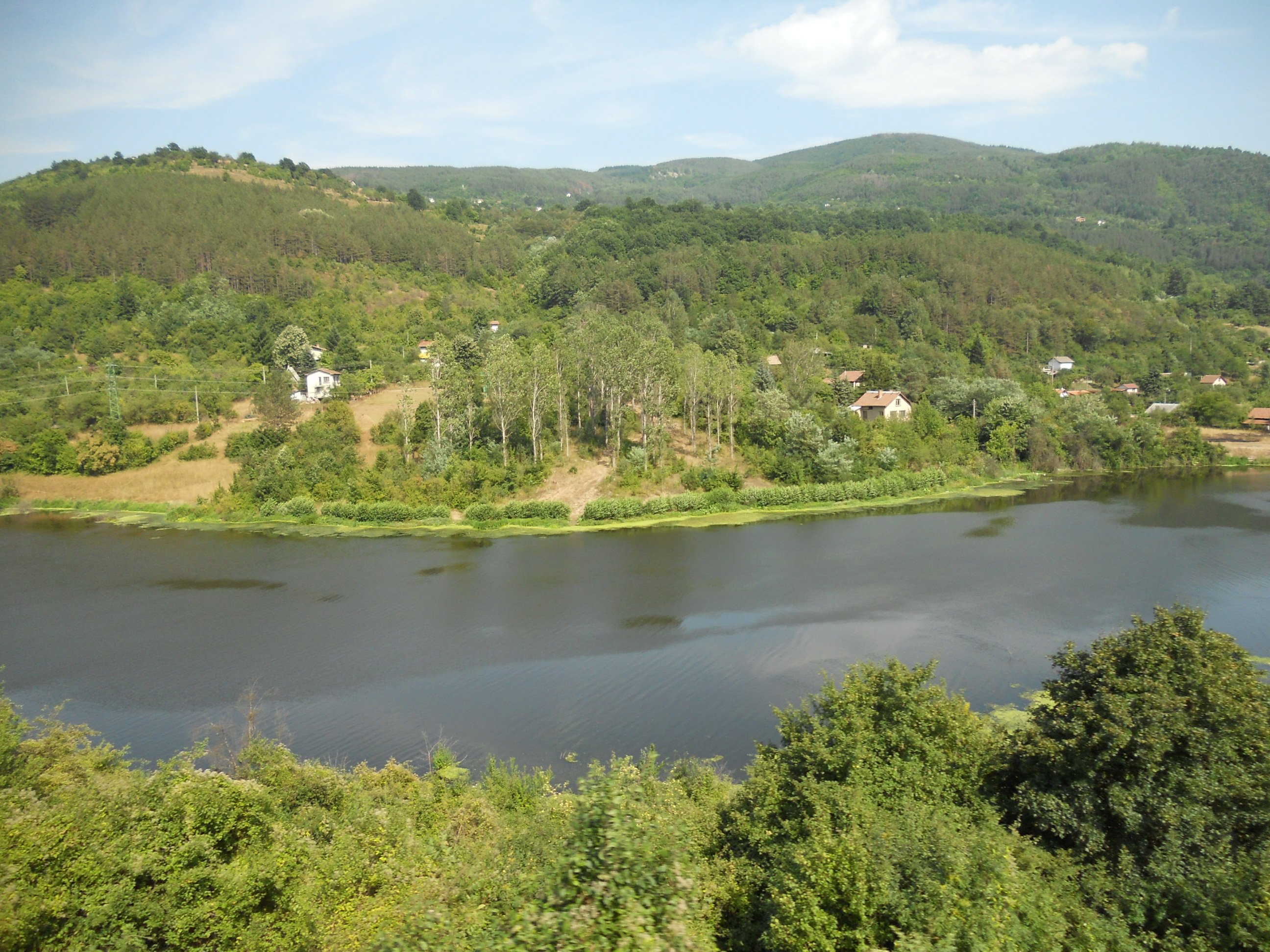
Iskar passing through the Balkan Mountains

The autochthonous ichthyofauna consists of at least 50 species of two classes, Cephalaspidomorphi (jawless fishes) and Actinopterygii (ray-finned fishes), and five orders, Petromyzontiformes (lampreys), Siluriformes (catfish), Gadiformes, Esociformes (pikes and allies) and Perciformes. Many of them are restricted to the lower course near the confluence with the Danube. The jawless fishes of the order Petromyzontiformes are represented by a single family Petromyzontidae with two species, brook lamprey, Carpathian brook lamprey. The Siluriformes include the only species of this order in Europe, the wels catfish. The only freshwater fish of the order Gadiformes, the burbot, inhabits the lower course near the Danube, which is among the southernmost points of its range. The Esociformes are also represented by a single species, the northern pike.

The Perciformes are the most diverse order of fishes in the Iskar, represented by several families. The autochthonous species of the family Percidae include pikeperch, Volga pikeperch, European perch, common zingel, streber, Eurasian ruffe, Balon's ruffe, striped ruffe, The Cyprinidae are represented by asp, tench, Danube bleak, common bleak, riffle minnow, silver bream, common bream, white-eye bream, blue bream, Vimba bream, sabrefish, ide, European chub, common nase, European bitterling, common roach, common minnow, common rudd, gudgeon, Kessler's gudgeon, Danube whitefin gudgeon, common barbel, Romanian barbel, crucian carp, The Nemacheilidae are represented by the stone loach, while the species of the family Cobitidae include European weather loach, spined loach, Balkan loach, golden spined loach, Bulgarian spined loach, and Cottus haemusi. The brown trout is the only representative of the Salmonidae. The predominantly marine family Clupeidae is represented by the Pontic shad. The Gobiidae include Kessler's goby, monkey goby and racer goby.

The Iskar used to be inhabited by one of the six species of sturgeons native to Bulgaria, the sterlet. It could be found upstream as far south as the town of Lukovit but has been extinct from the river and inhabits only the Danube.

The amphibians are represented by frogs, such as the European fire-bellied toad, yellow-bellied toad, European green toad, agile frog, European tree frog, common spadefoot, as wells as by two newt species—Danube crested newt and Balkan crested newt. The waters of the Iskar are habitat of the European pond turtle, dice snake and grass snake with a number of other reptiles inhabiting the river banks and surrounding areas, such as spur-thighed tortoise, Herman's tortoise, horned viper, Blotched snake, Caspian whipsnake, Aesculapian snake, European green lizard, common wall lizard, Balkan wall lizard, etc.

== Honour ==
Iskar Glacier on Livingston Island in the South Shetland Islands, Antarctica is named after Iskar River.

== See also ==
- Geography of Bulgaria
- List of rivers of Bulgaria
- Iskar Gorge
- Danube
- Rila

== Sources ==
=== References ===
- Мичев (Michev), Николай (Nikolay); Михайлов (Mihaylov), Цветко (Tsvetko); Вапцаров (Vaptsarov), Иван (Ivan); Кираджиев (Kiradzhiev), Светлин (Svetlin) (1980). Географски речник на България [Geographic Dictionary of Bulgaria] (in Bulgarian). София (Sofia): Наука и култура (Nauka i kultura).
- Дончев (Donchev), Дончо (Doncho); Каракашев (Karakashev), Христо (Hristo) (2004). Теми по физическа и социално-икономическа география на България (Topics on Physical and Social-Economic Geography of Bulgaria) (in Bulgarian). София (Sofia): Ciela. ISBN 954-649-717-7.
- Карапеткова (Karapetkova), Мария (Maria); Живков (Zhivkov), Младен (Mladen) (2000). Рибите в България (Fish in Bulgaria) (in Bulgarian). София (Sofia): Гея Либрис (Gea Libris).

=== External links ===
- "Iskar River System". Data for the Waters in Bulgaria. Archived from the original on 7 December 2017.
- "Iskar River". Official Site of Lakatnik.
