= Golyam Kupen =

Mountain in Bulgaria

Coordinates: 42°33′2″N 23°19′6″E

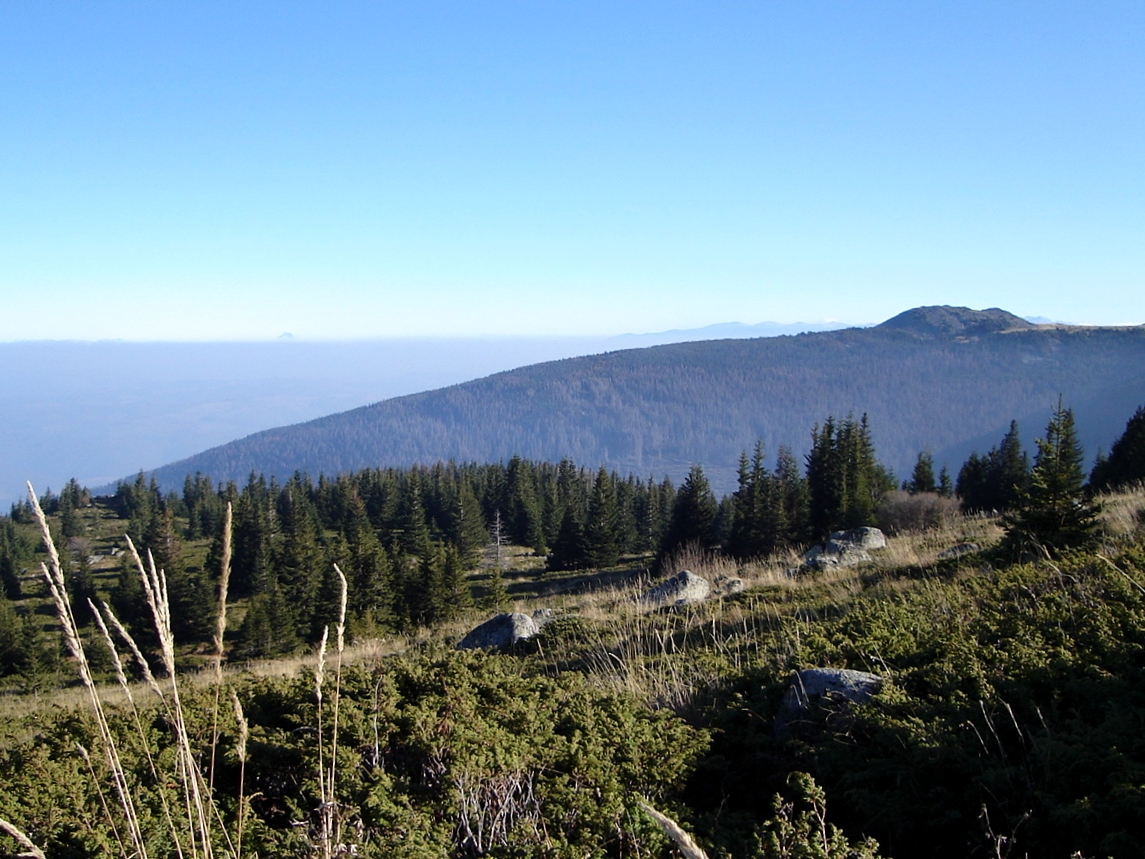
Golyam Kupen from Pogledets site.

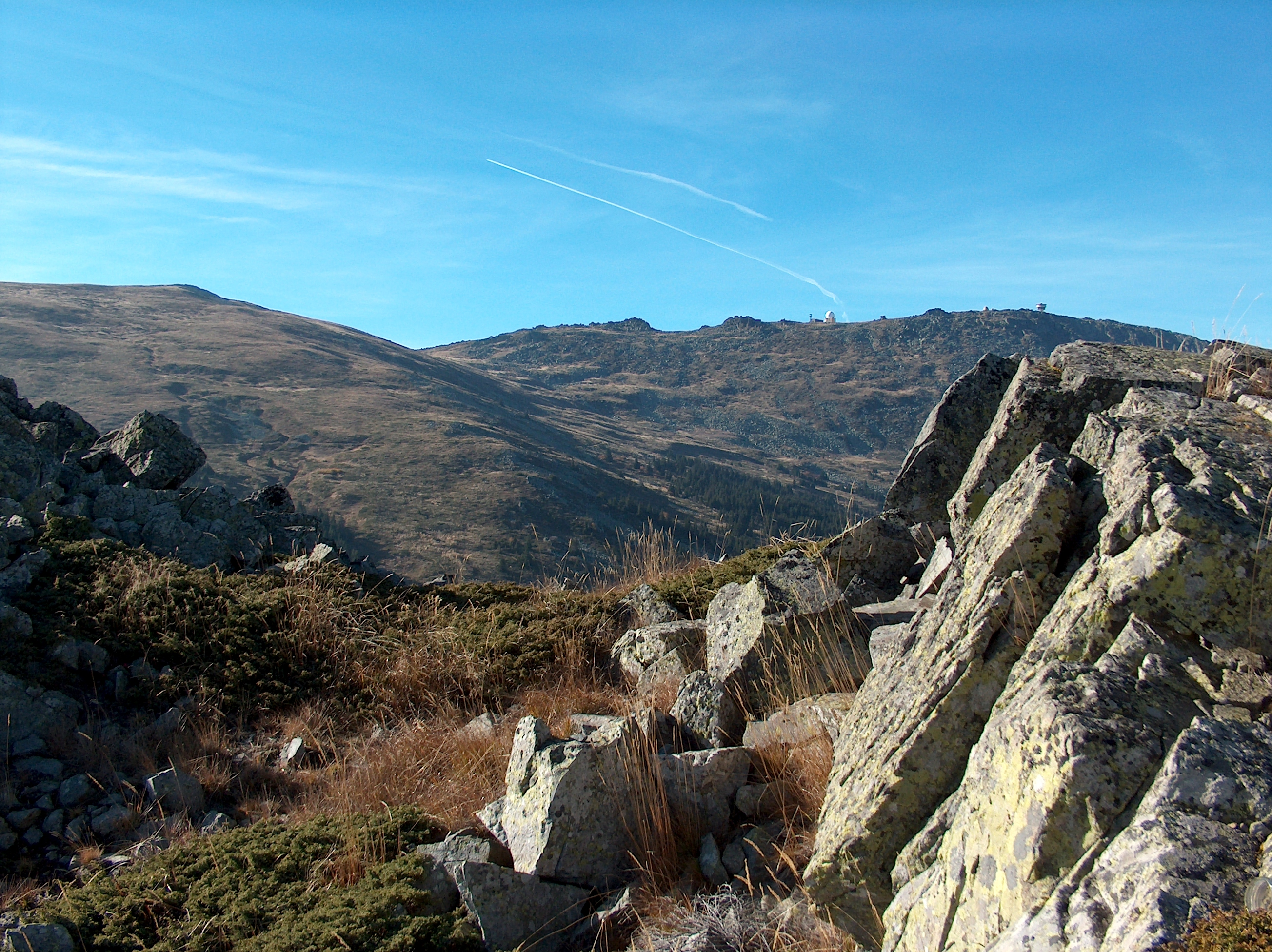
Golyam Kupen, with Skoparnik and Golyam Rezen Peaks in the background.

Golyam Kupen (Bulgarian: Голям Купен) is a peak rising to 1,930 m in Vitosha Mountain, Bulgaria. The peak is situated on the southern border of Bistrishko Branishte Biosphere Reserve, on the watershed between Vitoshka Bistritsa to the north and Selska Reka (‘Village River’) to the south, rivers flowing eastwards to the villages of Bistritsa and Zheleznitsa respectively, and eventually to Iskar River.

Golyam Rezen is accessible by tracks coming from Golyam Rezen Peak in the northwest; from Aleko Centre via the upper Bistrishko Branishte; and from Zheleznitsa in the east-southeast. Fizkulturnik Chalet is situated in the southern foothills of the peak, overlooking Kazana (‘Cauldron’) site.

== See also ==
- Bistrishko Branishte
- Vitosha
