= Skoparnik =

Mountain in Bulgaria

Coordinates: 42°33′11″N 23°17′47″E

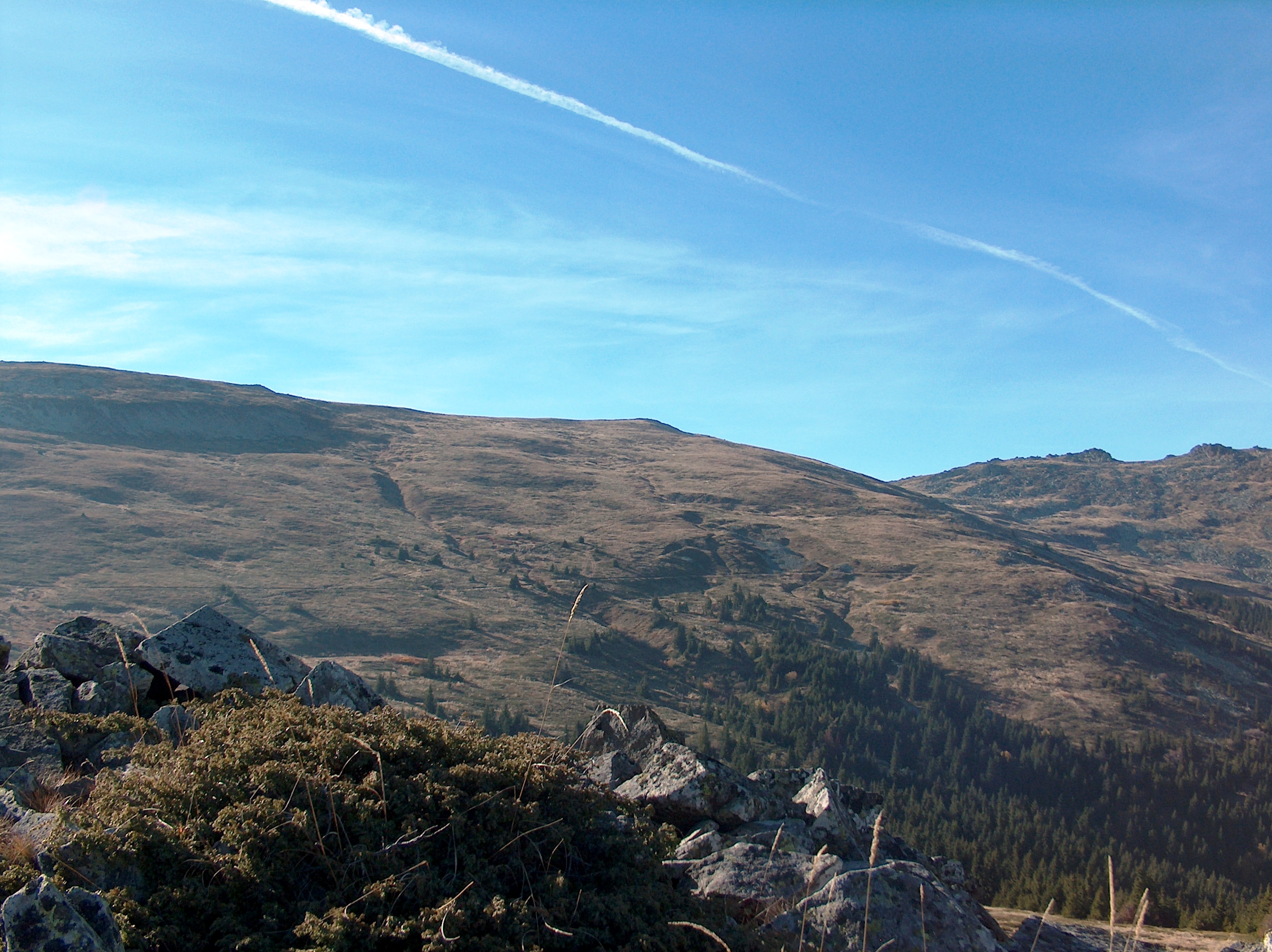
Skoparnik Peak from Golyam Kupen Peak.

Skoparnik (Bulgarian: Скопарник [skoˈparnik]) is the third highest peak of Vitosha Mountain in Bulgaria. Rising to 2,226 m, the peak is situated 1.5 km south of Golyam Rezen Peak (2,277 m), and 2 km southeast of the summit Cherni Vrah (2,290 m). The peak is bounded by the Bistrishko Branishte Biosphere Reserve to the east, and a prohibited drinking water catchment area to the west, and is part of the divide between the Black Sea and the Mediterranean, with the Vitoshka Bistritsa draining its eastern slopes to flow into the Iskar River and eventually to the Danube River, and the Struma River draining the western slopes to flow into the Aegean Sea.

The peak is accessible by tracks coming from Golyam Rezen Peak in the north; from Aleko Centre or Bistritsa via the upper Bistrishko Branishte; from Zheleznitsa Village in the east; and from Chuypetlovo and Yarlovo Villages in the southwest and south.

Skoparnik Bluff on Trinity Peninsula in Antarctica is named after the peak.

== See also ==
- Golyam Rezen
- Bistrishko Branishte
- Vitosha
