= Bistrishko Branishte =

Biosphere reserve in Bulgaria

Coordinates: 42°37′50″N 23°15′17″E

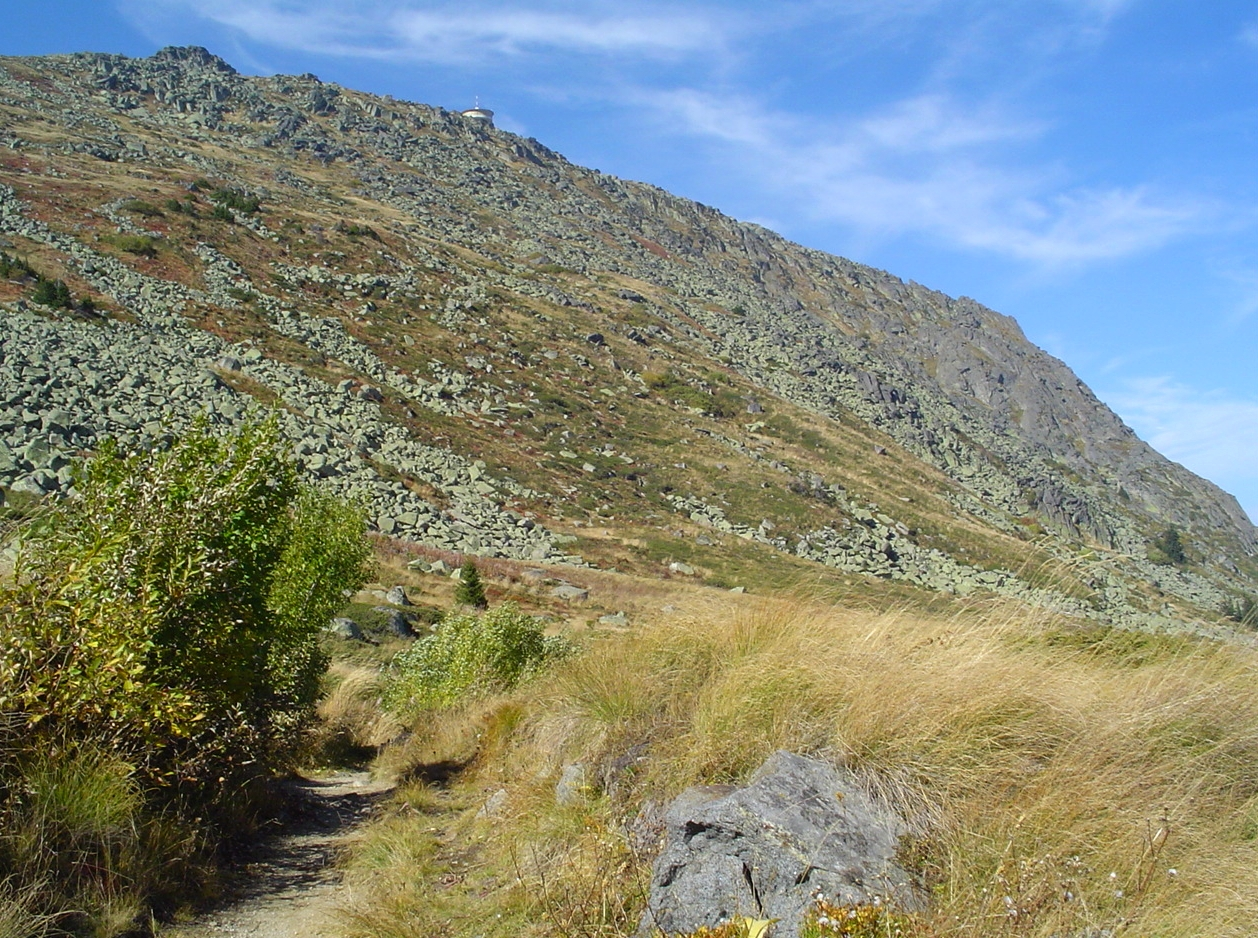
A track in the foothills of Golyam Rezen Peak crossing the upper Bistrishko Branishte.

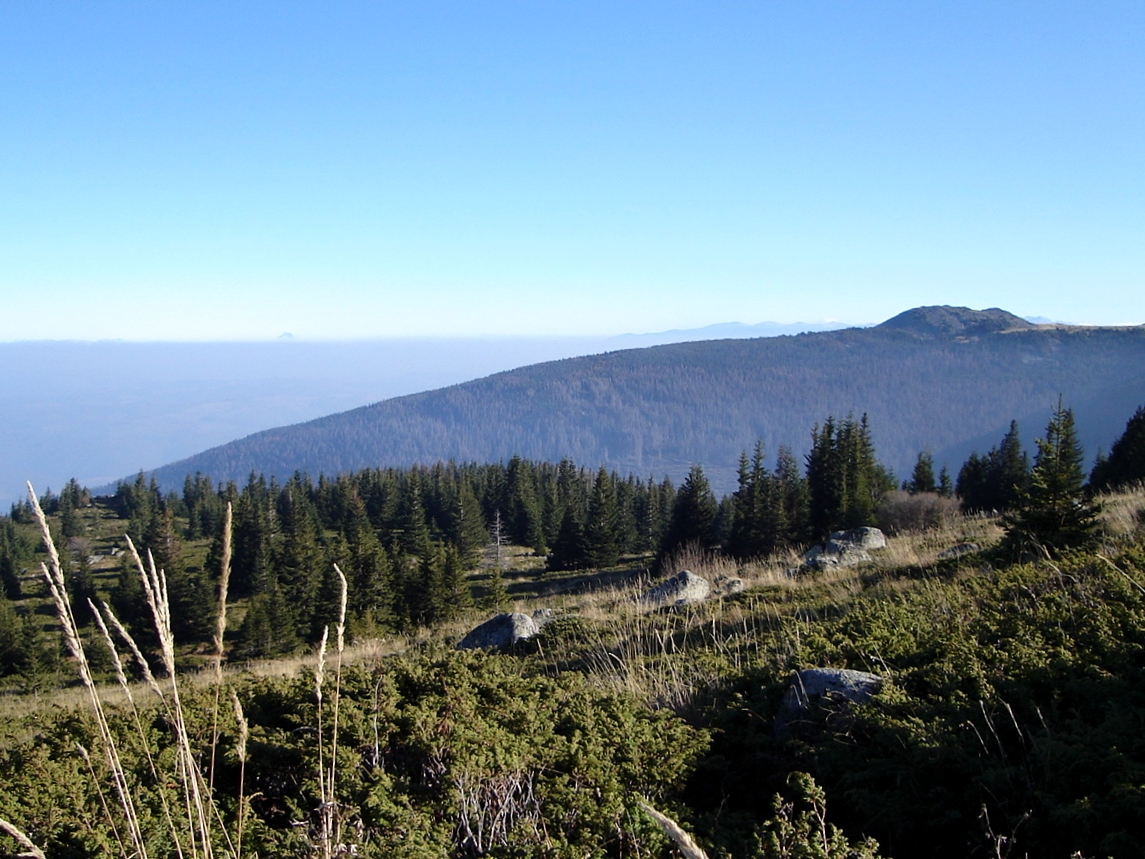
Pogledets site on the eastern border of Bistrishko Branishte, with Golyam Kupen Peak in the background.

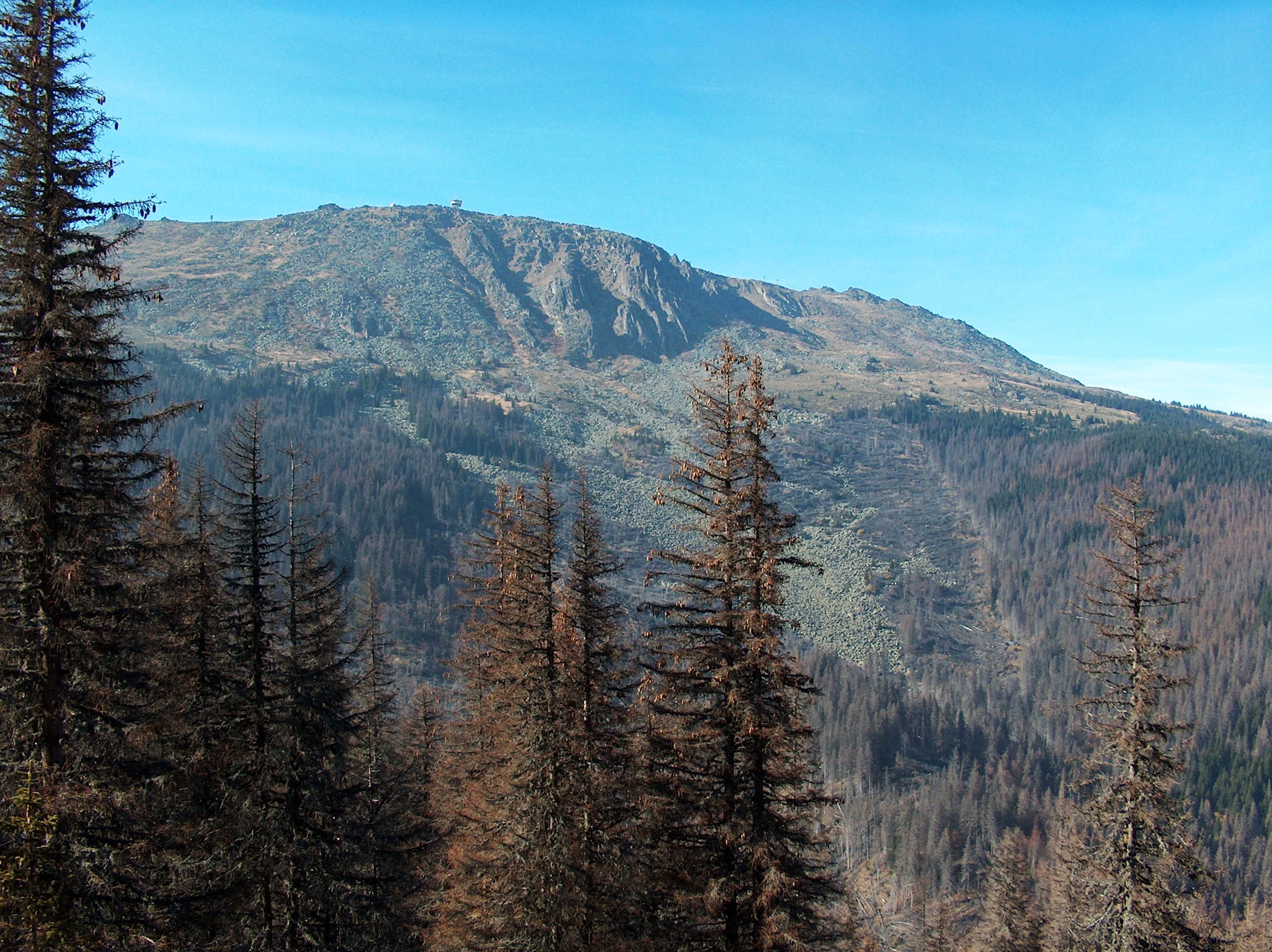
Bistrishko Branishte from near Golyam Kupen Peak, with Golyam Rezen and Malak Rezen Peaks in the background.

Bistrishko Branishte (Bulgarian: Бистришко бранище) is a nature reserve in the Vitosha Nature Park on Vitosha Mountain in Bulgaria.

It was established in 1934, together with Vitosha Nature Park. Since 1977 it has been a biosphere reserve under the Man and the Biosphere (MAB) Programme of UNESCO.

The reserve comprises the eastern slopes of the peaks of Golyam Rezen (2277 m), Malak Rezen (2191 m) and Skoparnik (2226 m), the northern slopes of Golyam Kupen Peak (1930 m), the upper valleys of Vitoshka Bistritsa and Yanchevska rivers. Its surface area is 1061.6 ha, the elevation is between 1430 and 2277 m.

Over 50 % of its territory is covered by forest (predominantly spruce), 100 to 120 years old on the average. There are several stone runs in the Subalpine zone, penetrating the forest. The larger animals found in the reserve include deer, boar, wolf, bear.

Bistrishko Branishte attracts many tourists from the adjacent Aleko Centre situated off the northwestern border of the reserve. Visitors are not permitted to stray away from the few designated tracks linking the Vitosha's highest peak of Cherni Vrah, Aleko area, Bistritsa village (3 tracks running via Pogledets site and along Bistritsa and Yanchevska rivers), Zheleznitsa village.

== See also ==
- World Network of Biosphere Reserves
- List of biosphere reserves in Bulgaria
- Torfeno Branishte
- Golyamata Gramada
