= Golyamata Gramada =

Stone river on Vitosha Mountain, Bulgaria

- Голямата грамада ('Big Pile')
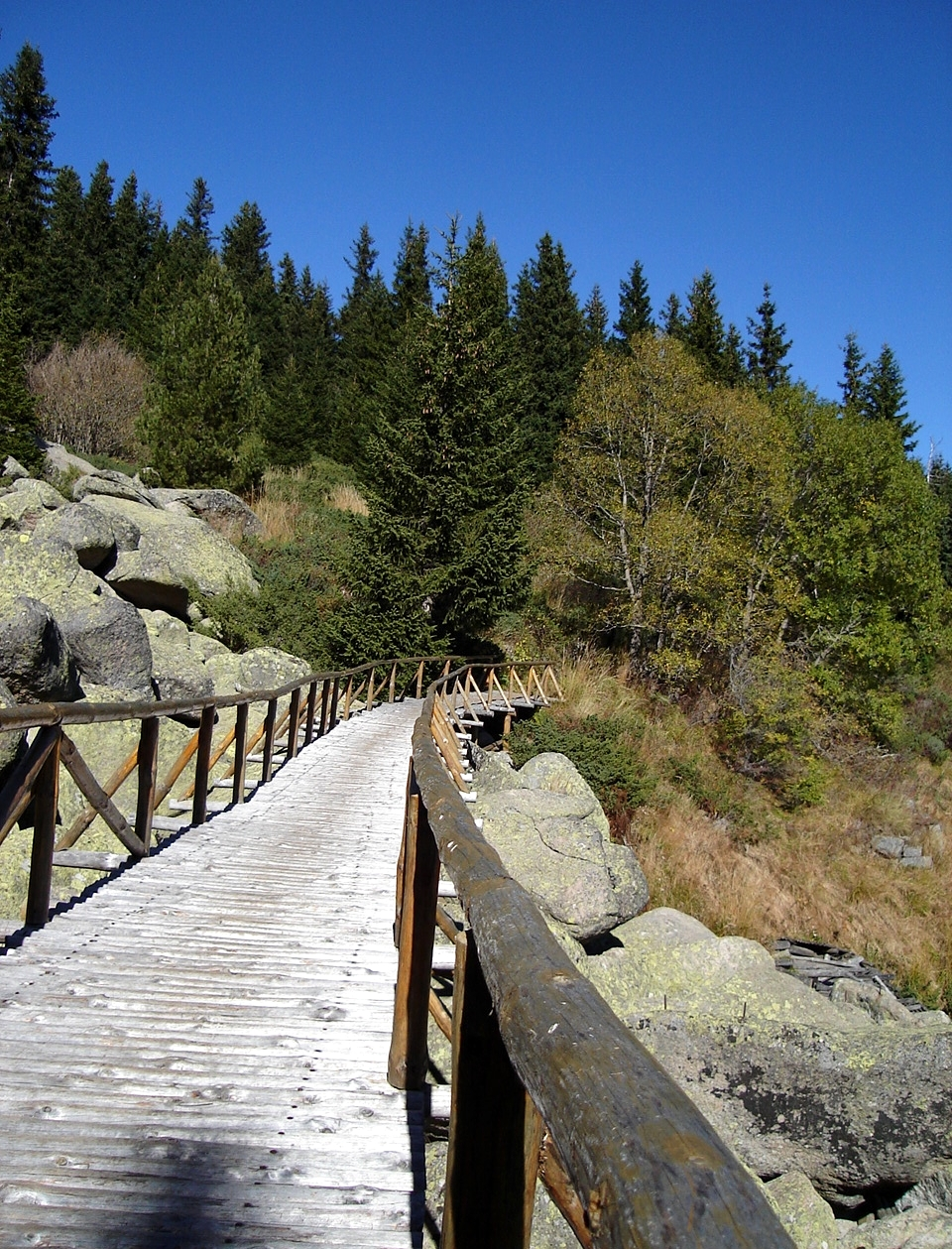
- Bridge over Triagalna Gramada (Triangle Pile) Stone River in Golyamata Gramada area.

Highest point
- Coordinates: 42.5650°N 23.3040°E

Dimensions
- Length: 1 km (0.62 mi)
- Width: 0.3 km (0.19 mi)

Geography
- Location: Bulgaria
- Parent range: Vitosha Mountain

Golyamata Gramada (Bulgarian: Голямата грамада, ‘Big Pile’) is one of the largest stone rivers on Vitosha Mountain, Bulgaria. The feature is situated in the upper valley of Vitoshka Bistritsa River in Bistrishko Branishte Nature Reserve, extending near 1 km, and up to 300 m wide. The stone river is ‘descending’ from elevation 1900 m above sea level at the foothills of Golyam Rezen Peak to 1550 m off the track between Bistritsa village and Aleko site (1810 m), the most popular tourist centre on Vitosha Mountain accessible also from Sofia by gondola lift.

== See also ==
- Bistrishko Branishte
- Vitosha

== Google view ==
- Golyamata Gramada (‘Big Pile’) Stone River, Vitosha Mountain, Bulgaria. (centred on the feature)
