= Burdick West Peak =

Location of Livingston Island in the South Shetland Islands.

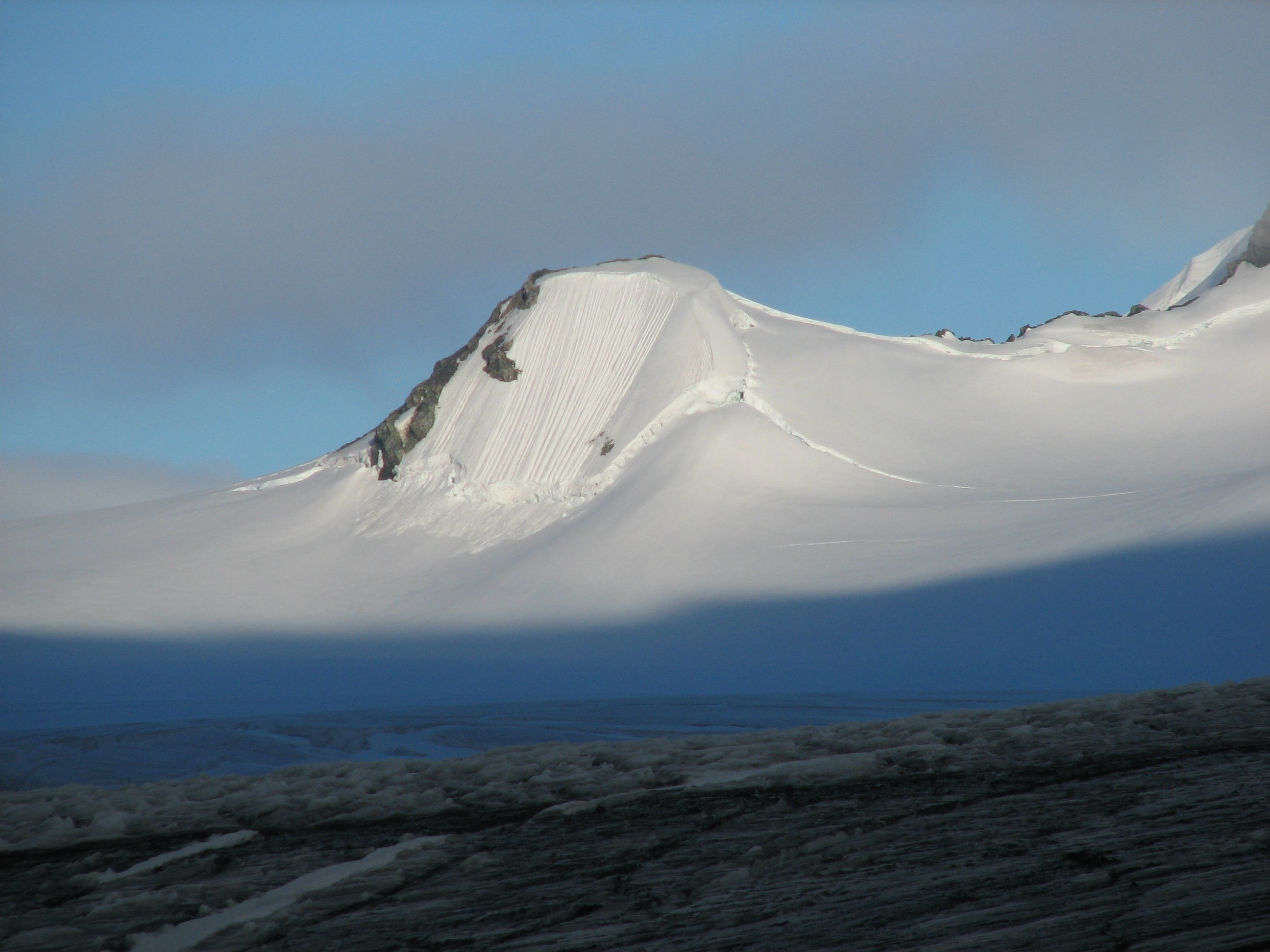
Burdick West Peak

Topographic map of Livingston Island, Greenwich, Robert, Snow and Smith Islands.

Burdick West Peak (Bulgarian: връх западен Бърдик, romanized: vrah zapaden Bardik, IPA: [ˈvrɤɣ ˈzapɐdɛn ˈbɤrdik]) rises to 455 m at the northwest extremity of Burdick Ridge in eastern Livingston Island. The peak is partly ice-free.

The feature takes its name from Burdick Peak, the summit of the eponymous ridge.

== Location ==
The peak is located at 62°37′50″S 60°16′16″W which is 900 m northwest by west of Burdick Peak, 630 m south by southeast of Rezen Knoll, 3.86 km east by southeast of Aleko Rock and 4.75 km east by north of Sinemorets Hill.

British mapping in 1968, detailed mapping by the Spanish Servicio Geográfico del Ejército in 1991. Co-ordinates, elevation and distances given according to a 1995-96 Bulgarian topographic survey.

== Maps ==
- L.L. Ivanov et al. Antarctica: Livingston Island and Greenwich Island, South Shetland Islands. Scale 1:100000 topographic map. Sofia: Antarctic Place-names Commission of Bulgaria, 2005.
- L.L. Ivanov. Antarctica: Livingston Island and Greenwich, Robert, Snow and Smith Islands. Scale 1:120000 topographic map. Troyan: Manfred Wörner Foundation, 2009.
- A. Kamburov and L. Ivanov. Bowles Ridge and Central Tangra Mountains: Livingston Island, Antarctica. Scale 1:25000 map. Sofia: Manfred Wörner Foundation, 2023. ISBN 978-619-90008-6-1
