= Stone run =

Rock landform made by myriad freeze-thaw cycles

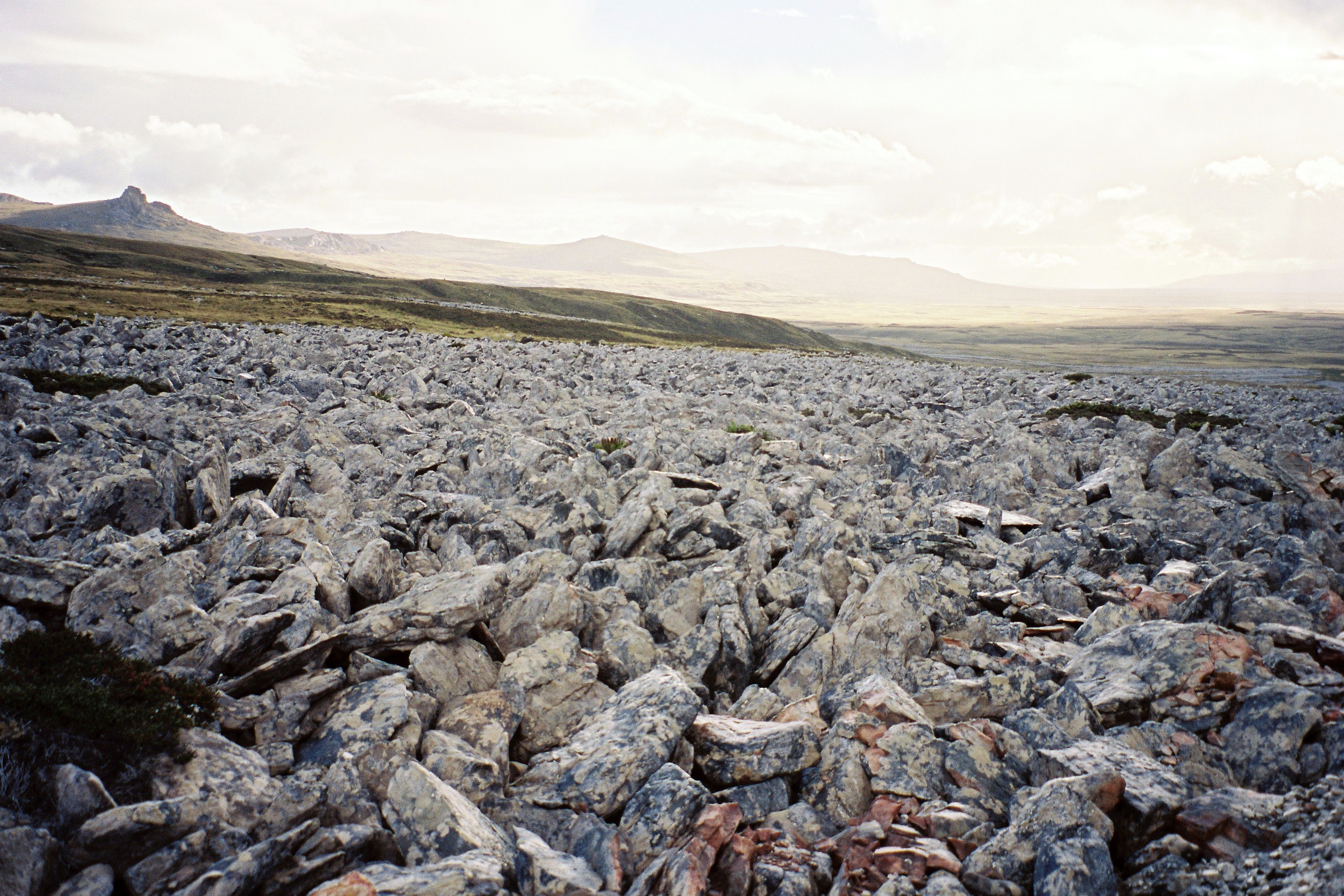
Stone run at Mount Kent, East Falkland

A stone run (called also stone river, stone stream or stone sea) is a rock landform resulting from the erosion of particular rock varieties caused by freezing-thawing cycles in periglacial conditions during the last Ice Age.

The actual formation of stone runs involved five processes: weathering, solifluction, frost heaving, frost sorting, and washing. The stone runs are essentially different from moraines, rock glaciers, and rock flows or other rock phenomena involving the actual flow of rock blocks under stress that is sufficient to break down the cement or to cause crushing of the angularities and points of the boulders. By contrast, the stone run boulders are fixed quite stably, providing for safer climbing and crossing of the run.

Stone runs are accumulations of boulders with no finer material between them. In the Falklands, they occur on slopes of between 1 and 10 degrees, and are the product of mass-movement and stone sorting during past periods of cold climate. They everywhere occur in association with poorly sorted, clay-rich solifluction deposits.

== Geographic distribution ==
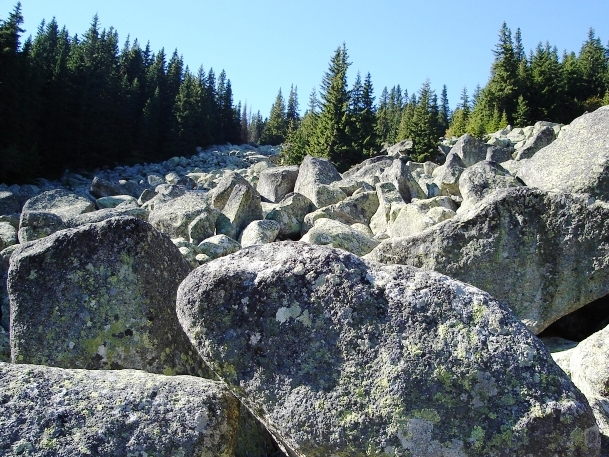
Typical stone river on Vitosha Mountain, Bulgaria.

The Falkland Islands and Vitosha Mountain (Bulgaria), both have an abundance of large stone runs. The highly specific combination of particular climatic conditions and rock varieties that existed there during the Quaternary explains both the formation of stone runs in those two territories and their absence in areas with otherwise comparable nature conditions.

For instance, while the present Falklands climate is quite similar to that of Scotland, the latter was completely glacial rather than periglacial during the relevant period, which would not allow for the formation of stone runs. On the other hand, due to geological and other specifics of the southern temperate and sub-Antarctic territories with climatic history similar to that of the Falklands (Prince Edward Islands, Crozet Islands, Kerguelen Islands, Macquarie Island, Campbell Islands, or nearby Tierra del Fuego and Patagonia), none of them features landforms comparable to the Falklands stone runs.

Likewise, the specific geology of Vitosha accounts for the fairly restricted examples of similar landforms in other Bulgarian or indeed Balkan mountains with comparable climatic record among which Vitosha is one of the smallest, extending just 15 km (9.3 mi) by 10 km (6.2 mi). However, even on that small territory the stone runs exist along with screes and other rock landforms, suggesting that the right periglacial conditions and rock composition are necessary but not sufficient conditions for the formation of stone runs.

Other examples of stone runs occur in England, including at the Stiperstones, Shropshire. They are also known in Pennsylvania. Small examples are probably very widespread where solifluction deposits contain large concentrations of frost-resistant rock blocks.

== Falklands stone runs ==
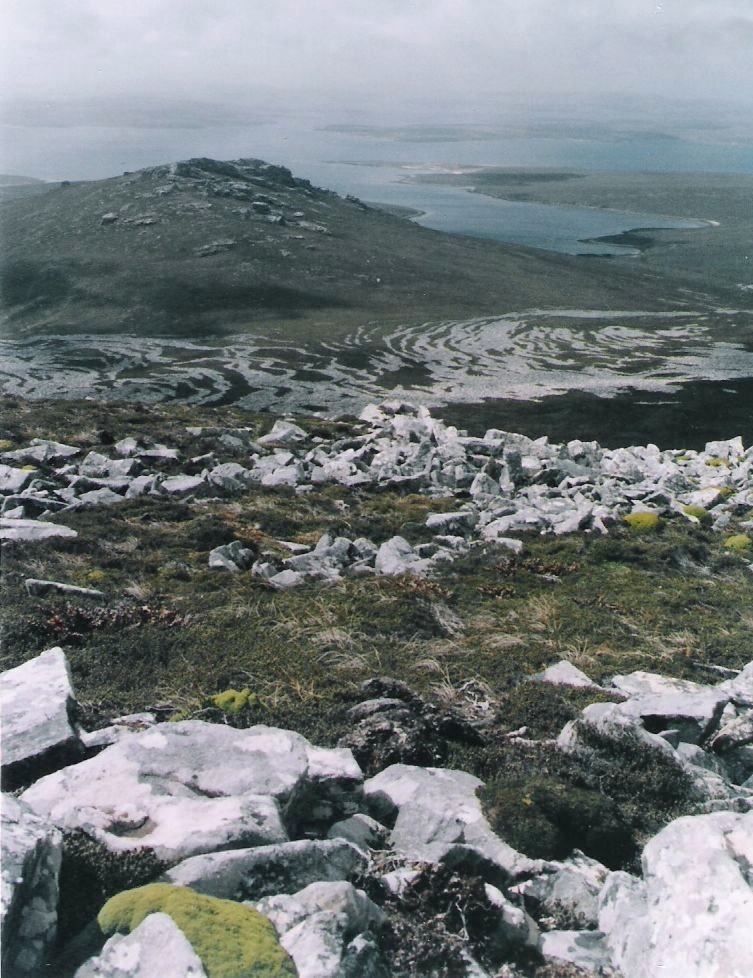
Stone runs on Weddell Island, Falkland Islands; Circum Peak and New Year Cove from Mount Weddell.

The Falklands stone runs are made up of hard quartzite blocks. They are more widespread and larger on East Falkland, especially in the Wickham Heights area where the largest of them extend over 5 km in length. Those on West Falkland and the minor islands are fewer in number and of smaller dimensions. Darwin's "great valley of fragments", subsequently renamed Princes Street Stone Run after Edinburgh's Princes Street that was cobbled at the time, occupies a 4 km long and 400 m wide shallow valley trending east-west. The feature is situated off the road to Port Louis, some 20 km northwest of Stanley.

An early description of the Falklands stone runs was given in Antoine-Joseph Pernety’s account of his exploration of the islands during the 1763–64 French expedition under Louis Antoine de Bougainville, which established the Port Saint Louis settlement on East Falkland. While crossing the neck between Baye Accaron (Berkeley Sound) and Baye Marville (Salvador Water) he described in detail two particular stone features he called ‘City Gates’ and ‘Amphitheatre’:

We were no less astonished at the sight of the infinite number of stones of all sizes thrown one upon another, and yet ranged as if they had been piled negligently to fill up some hollows. We admired with insatiable delight the prodigious works of Nature.

Pernety's observations were continued by the young Charles Darwin, who visited the Falklands in 1833 and 1834:

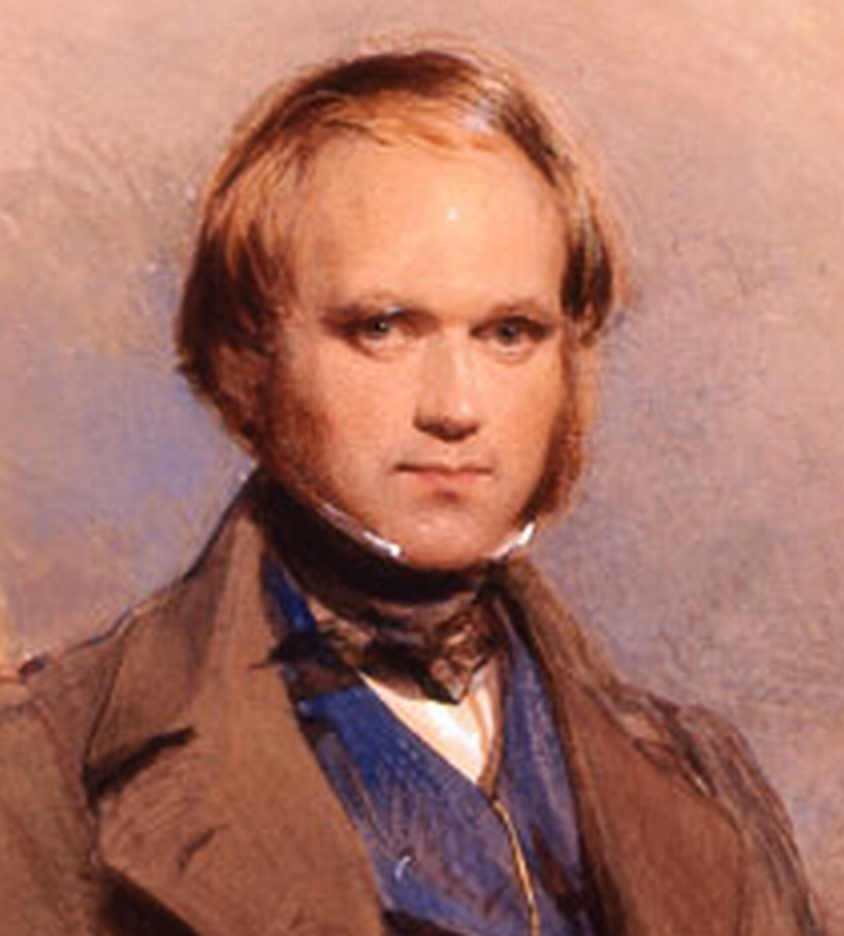
Charles Darwin a few years after his survey of the Falklands stone runs

Pernety has devoted several pages to the description of a Hill of Ruins, the successive strata of which he has justly compared to the seats of an amphitheatre. (...)

In many parts of the island the bottoms of the valleys are covered in an extraordinary manner by myriad great loose angular fragments of the quartz rock, forming "streams of stones." These have been mentioned with surprise by every voyager since the time of Pernety. The blocks are not waterworn, their angles being only a little blunted; they vary in size from one or two feet in diameter to ten, or even more than twenty times as much. They are not thrown together into irregular piles, but are spread out into level sheets or great streams. It is not possible to ascertain their thickness, but the water of small streamlets can be heard trickling through the stones many feet below the surface. The actual depth is probably great, because the crevices between the lower fragments must long ago have been filled up with sand. The width of these sheets of stones varies from a few hundred feet to a mile; but the peaty soil daily encroaches on the borders, and even forms islets wherever a few fragments happen to lie close together. In a valley south of Berkeley Sound, which some of our party called the "great valley of fragments," it was necessary to cross an uninterrupted band half a mile wide, by jumping from one pointed stone to another. So large were the fragments, that being overtaken by a shower of rain, I readily found shelter beneath one of them.

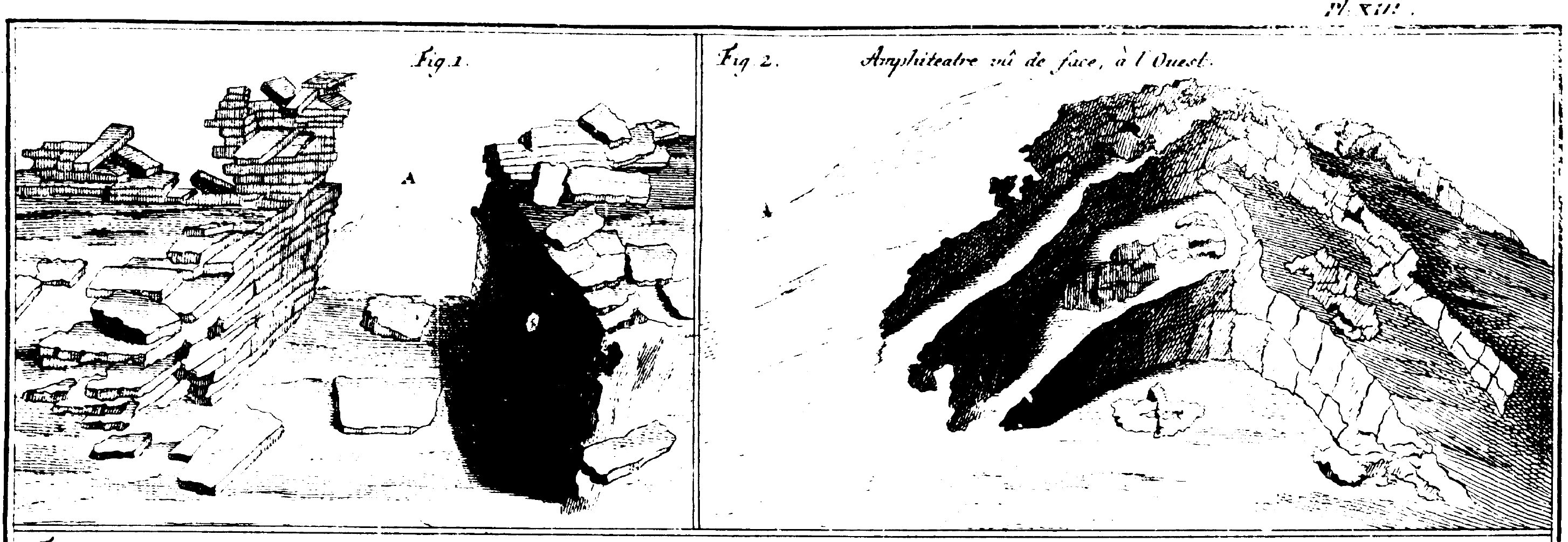
Stone ‘city gates’ and ‘amphitheatre’ on the East Falkland (Dom Pernety, 1769).

Their little inclination is the most remarkable circumstance in these "streams of stones." On the hill-sides I have seen them sloping at an angle of ten degrees with the horizon; but in some of the level, broad-bottomed valleys, the inclination is only just sufficient to be clearly perceived. On so rugged a surface there was no means of measuring the angle; but to give a common illustration, I may say that the slope would not have checked the speed of an English mail-coach. In some places, a continuous stream of these fragments followed up the course of a valley, and even extended to the very crest of the hill. On these crests huge masses, exceeding in dimensions any small building, seemed to stand arrested in their headlong course: there, also, the curved strata of the archways lay piled on each other, like the ruins of some vast and ancient cathedral. (...)

These scenes are on the spot rendered more striking by the contrast of the low, rounded forms of the neighbouring hills.

== Vitosha stone rivers ==
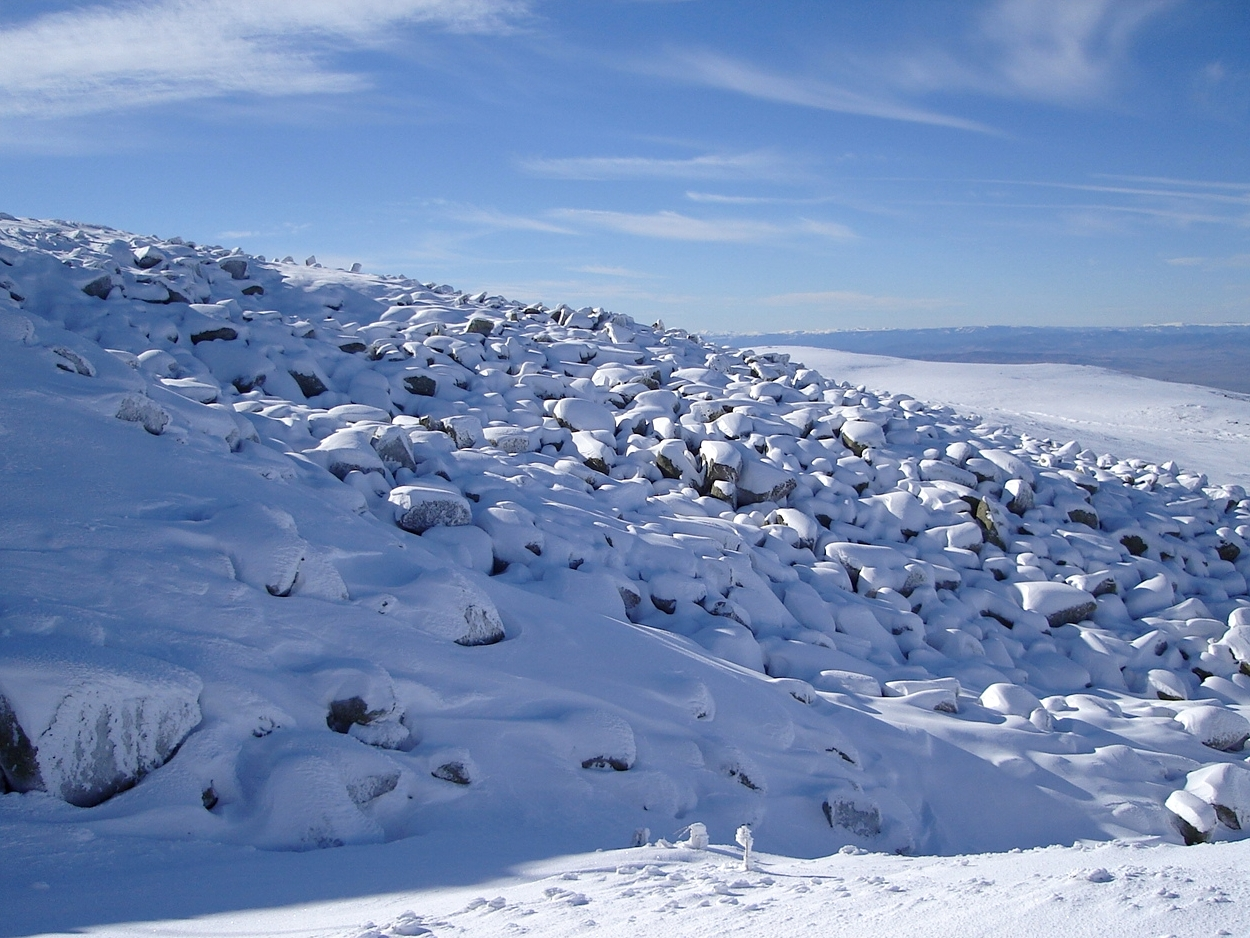
Stone river at Malak Rezen Peak, Vitosha Mountain.

The Vitosha stone rivers (Bulgarian: каменна река / kamenna reka, pl. каменни реки / kamenni reki), located in Bulgaria, are situated in the middle and upper mountain belts at elevation over 1,000 m above sea level. Among the largest ones are those on the Subalpine plateaus surrounding the summit Cherni Vrah (2290 m), and in the upper courses of the mountain's rivers, extending over 2 km at the Zlatnite Mostove (‘Golden Bridges’) site in the upper course of Vladayska River, and over 1 km in the case of Boyanska, Bistritsa, and Struma Rivers. Golyamata Gramada (Big Pile) Stone River in Vitoshka Bistritsa River valley is up to 300 m wide, and other stone run formations sprawl even wider on the mountain slopes, notably the ‘stone sea’ at the northern foot of Kamen Del Peak. Some boulders are several dozen to over three hundred cubic metres in volume, and sixty to several hundred tons weight.

While Vitosha was known already to Thucydides, Aristotle, and Pliny the Elder in Antiquity, its first modern geological survey was made as late as 1836 by the German-French-Austrian scientist Ami Boué who incidentally had studied medicine at Edinburgh University just a few years before Charles Darwin did. Since Boué, it took several decades of argument to conclude that Vitosha stone rivers were not true glacial moraines as some believed.

Exploited in the past as a source of cobblestone material for Sofia’s streets, nowadays the stone rivers are protected by law. Special permission has been granted in exceptional cases for the removal of some material for sculpture artwork. As a nature park situated right by the outskirts of Sofia (Cherni Vrah itself being 16 km away from the central square of Sofia), Vitosha is a major tourist destination. Some 1.5 million people from dozens of nations visit the mountain annually, and the stone rivers feature high on the list of tourist attractions.
