= Rezen Knoll =

Peak in the South Shetland Islands, Antarctica

Location of Livingston Island in the South Shetland Islands

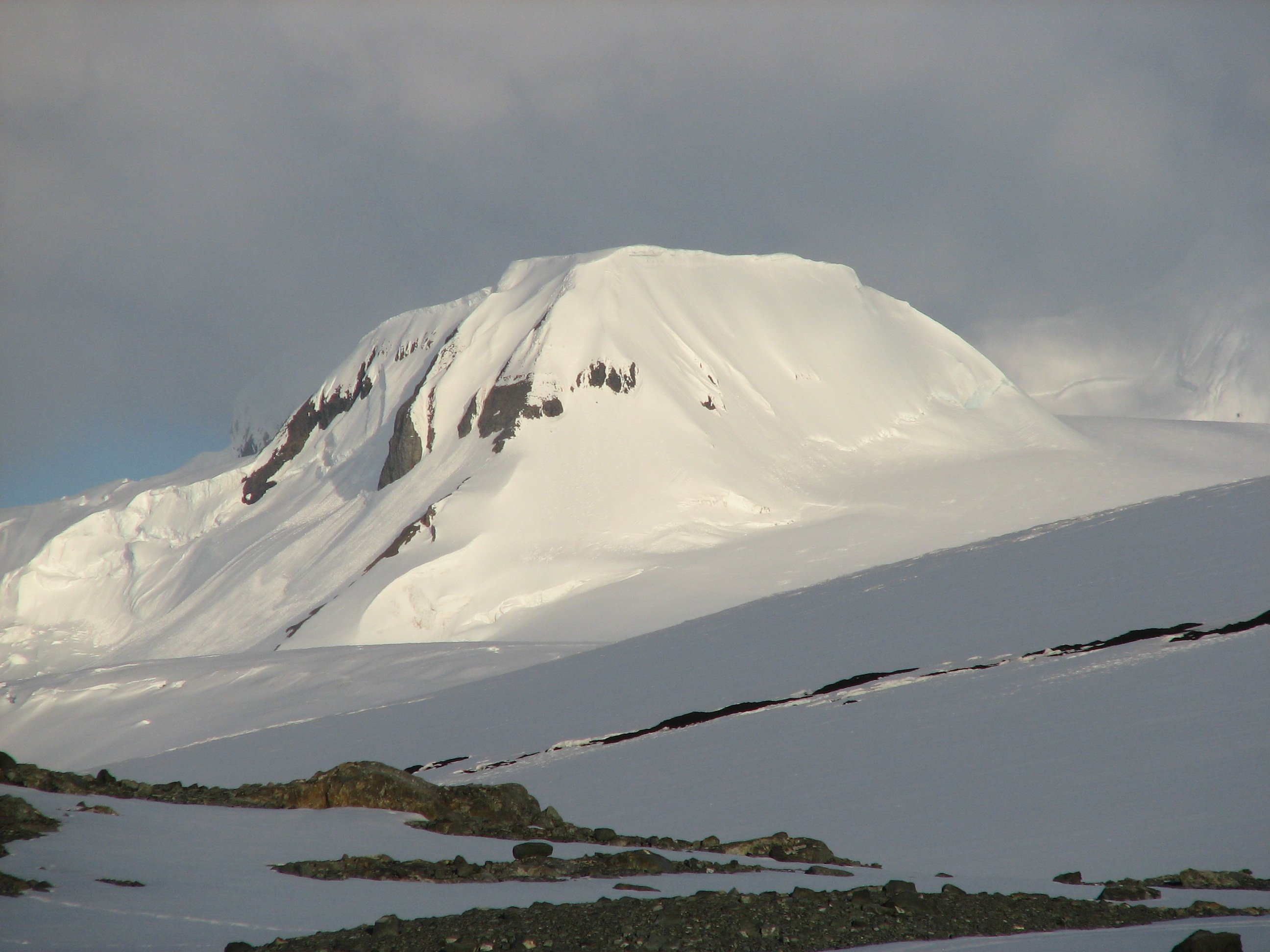
Rezen Knoll from near the Bulgarian Base

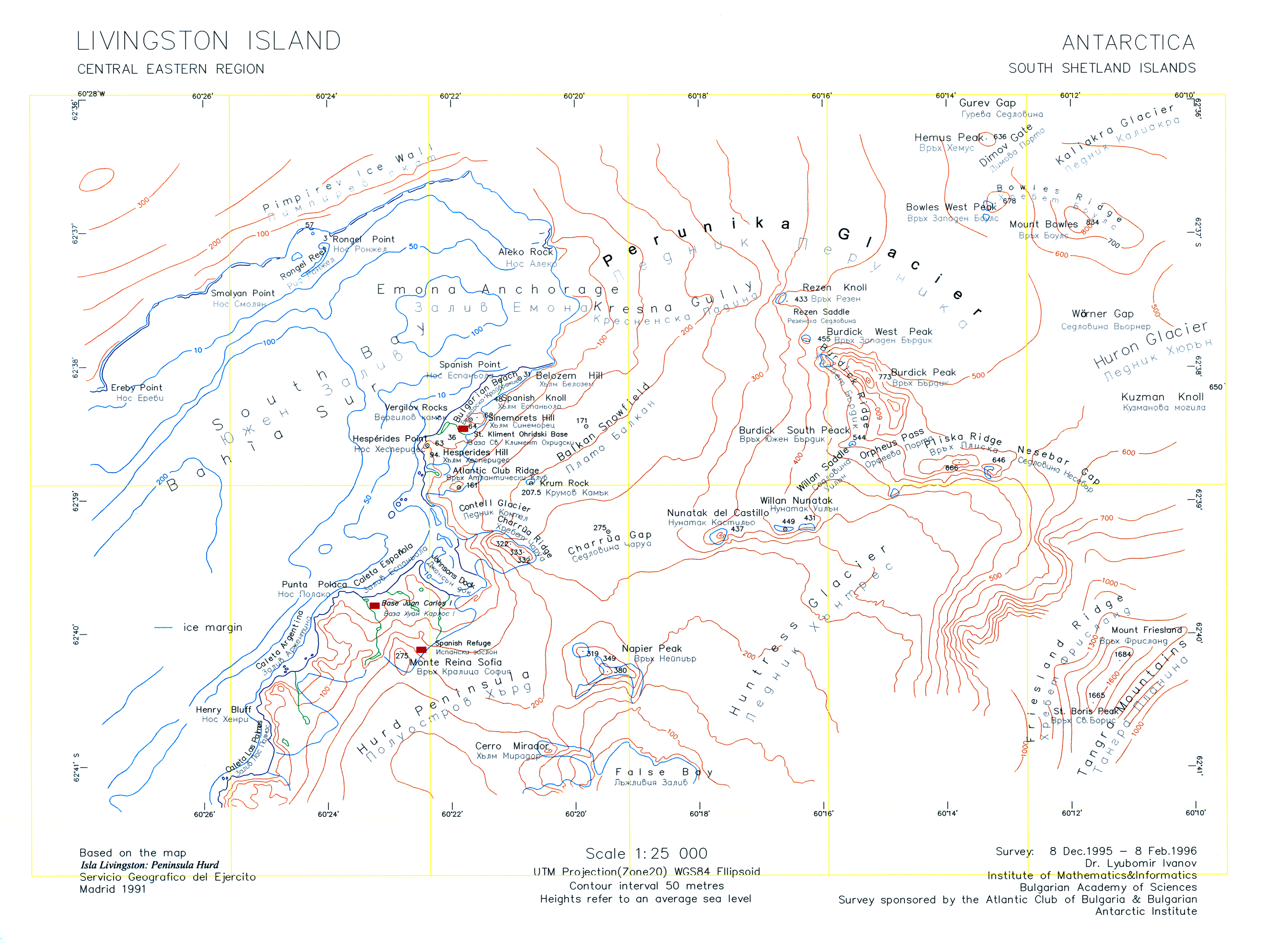
Topographic map of central-eastern Livingston Island featuring Rezen Knoll

Topographic map of Livingston Island, Greenwich, Robert, Snow and Smith Islands

Rezen Knoll (Bulgarian: връх Резен, romanized: vrah Rezen, IPA: [ˈvrɤx ˈrɛzɛn]) is a knoll rising to 433 m in eastern Livingston Island in the South Shetland Islands, Antarctica. The knoll is bounded to the east, north and west by Perunika Glacier, and linked to Burdick Ridge by Rezen Saddle. The feature is 250 m wide, extending 500 m in east-west direction. Composed of lavas, with precipitous slopes except to the east. Partly ice-free height and western and northern slopes.

First ascent by the Bulgarians Kuzman Tuhchiev, Dimo Dimov and Ivan Tashukov from St. Kliment Ohridski Base during the 1994/95 season.

Rough British mapping in 1968, detailed mapping by the Spanish Servicio Geográfico del Ejército in 1991. Co-ordinates, elevation and distances given according to a 1995-96 Bulgarian topographic survey.

A descriptive name of national geography. Golyam (Big) Rezen and Malak (Little) Rezen are two of the most spectacular peaks of Vitosha Mountain near Sofia, Bulgaria. ‘Rezen’ is the Bulgarian for ‘slice.’

== Location ==
The hill is located at 62°37′31″S 60°16′37″W, which is 3.94 km west by south of Mount Bowles, 3.07 km east-southeast of Aleko Point, 4.65 km east-northeast of Sinemorets Hill, 1.56 km northwest of Burdick Peak, and 630 m north-northwest of Burdick West Peak.

== Maps ==
- Isla Livingston: Península Hurd. Mapa topográfico de escala 1:25000. Madrid: Servicio Geográfico del Ejército, 1991. (Map reproduced on p. 16 of the linked work)
- L.L. Ivanov. Livingston Island: Central-Eastern Region. Scale 1:25000 topographic map. Sofia: Antarctic Place-names Commission of Bulgaria, 1996.
- L.L. Ivanov et al. Antarctica: Livingston Island and Greenwich Island, South Shetland Islands. Scale 1:100000 topographic map. Sofia: Antarctic Place-names Commission of Bulgaria, 2005.
- L.L. Ivanov. Antarctica: Livingston Island and Greenwich, Robert, Snow and Smith Islands. Scale 1:120000 topographic map. Troyan: Manfred Wörner Foundation, 2009. ISBN 978-954-92032-6-4
- Antarctic Digital Database (ADD). Scale 1:250000 topographic map of Antarctica. Scientific Committee on Antarctic Research (SCAR). Since 1993, regularly upgraded and updated.
- L.L. Ivanov. Antarctica: Livingston Island and Smith Island. Scale 1:100000 topographic map. Manfred Wörner Foundation, 2017. ISBN 978-619-90008-3-0
