= Malak Rezen =

Coordinates: 42°34′27″N 23°17′26″E

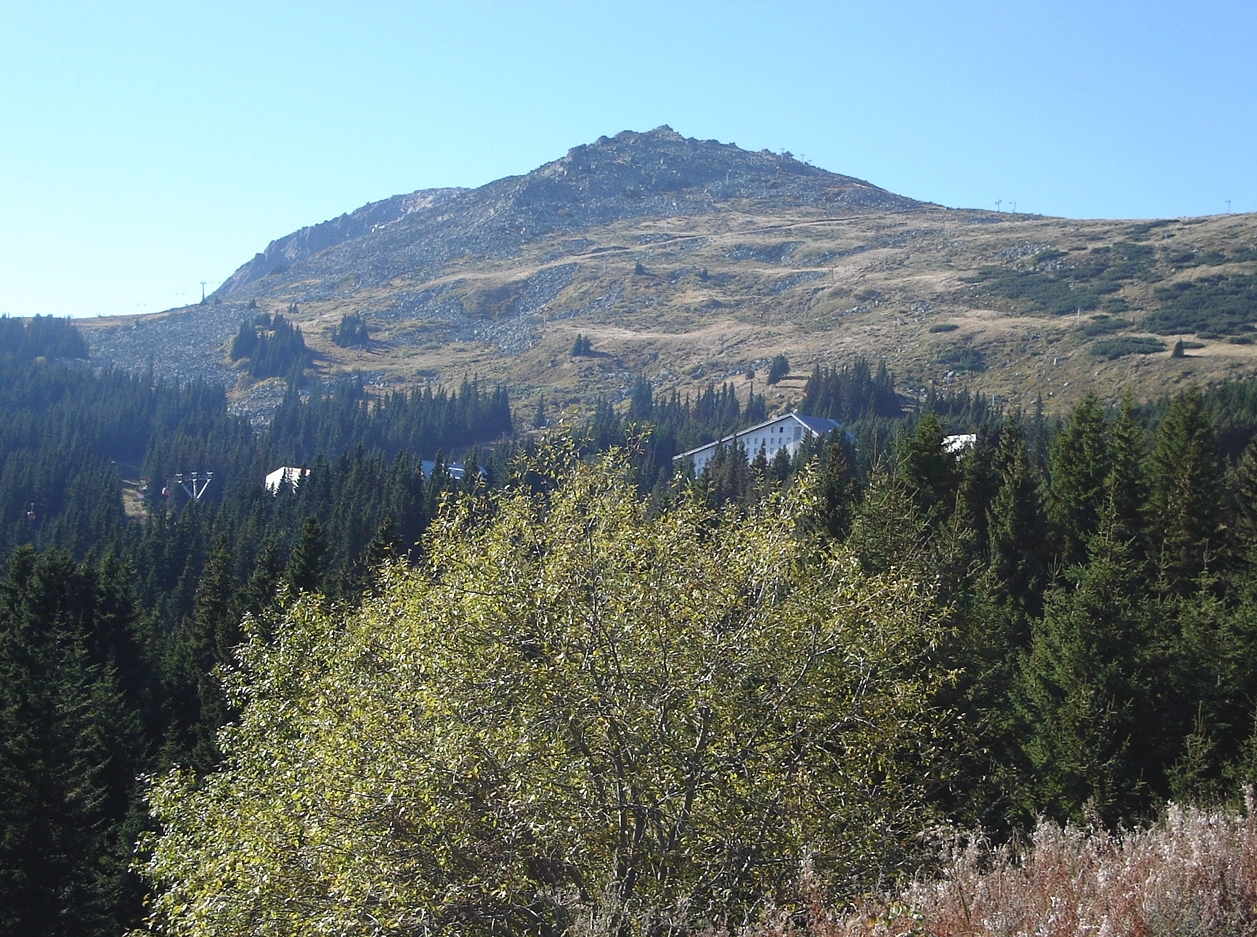
Malak Rezen Peak with Stenata ski run on the right, and Aleko site in the foreground.

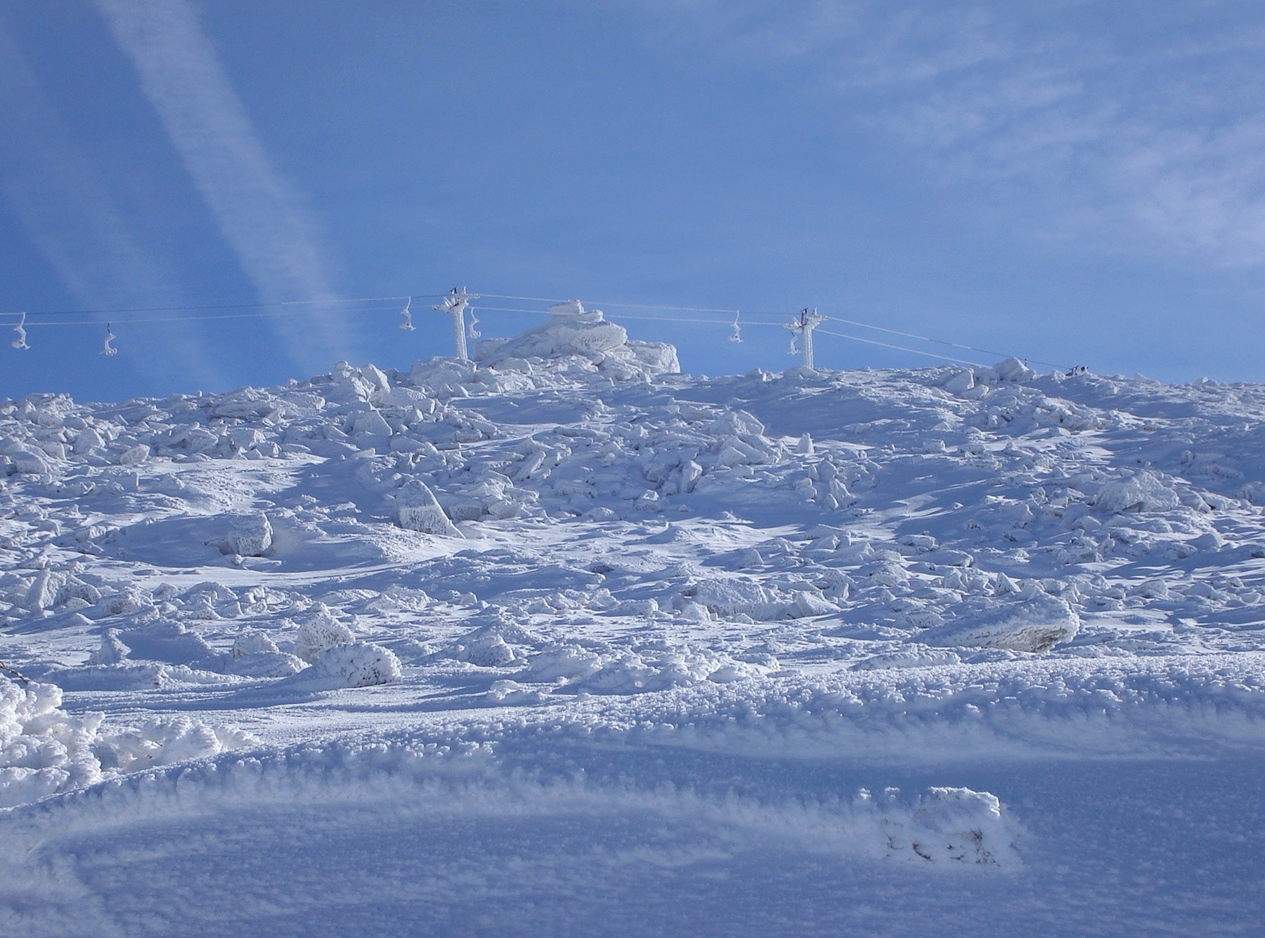
Malak Rezen Peak traversed by the Romanski chair lift.

Malak Rezen (Bulgarian: Малък Резен / ‘Little Slice’) is a peak rising to 2,191 m in northeastern Vitosha Mountain in Bulgaria. The peak is situated 1.5 km northeast of the summit Cherni Vrah, and 1.3 km north by east of Golyam Rezen Peak, surmounting Stenata ski run and Aleko site to the north.

Malak Rezen is accessible by the Romanski chair lift, and serves in turn as a convenient starting point for the three highest peaks of Vitosha Mountain — Cherni Vrah (2,290 m), Golyam Rezen (2,277 m), and Skoparnik (2,226 m).

Rezen Knoll on Livingston Island in the South Shetland Islands, Antarctica is named for the peaks of Malak Rezen and Golyam Rezen.

== See also ==
- Golyam Rezen
- Vitosha
- Mountains in Antarctica
