= Golyam Rezen =

Peak on Vitosha Mountain, Bulgaria

Coordinates: 42°34′10″N 23°17′29″E

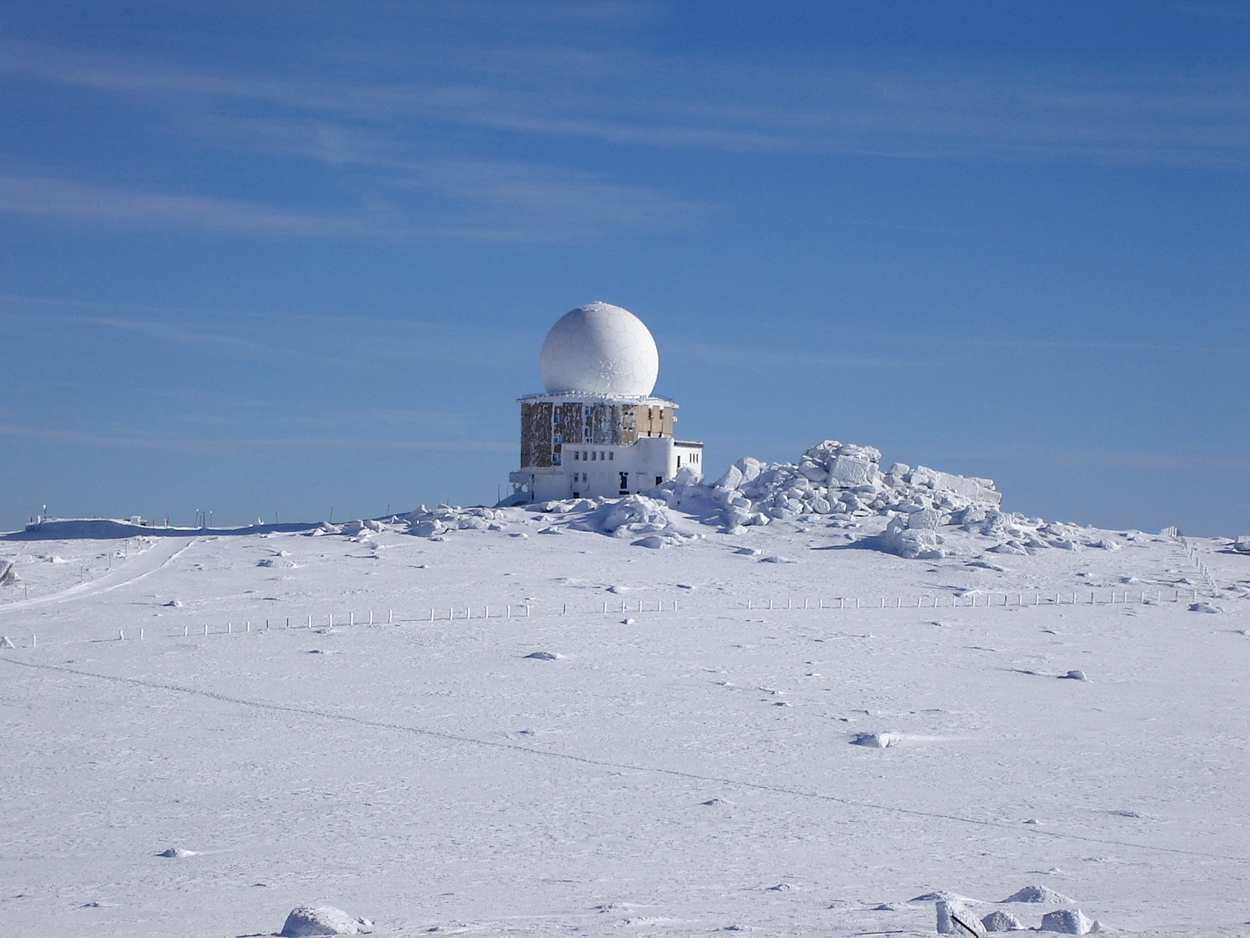
The Air Traffic Services facility on Golyam Rezen

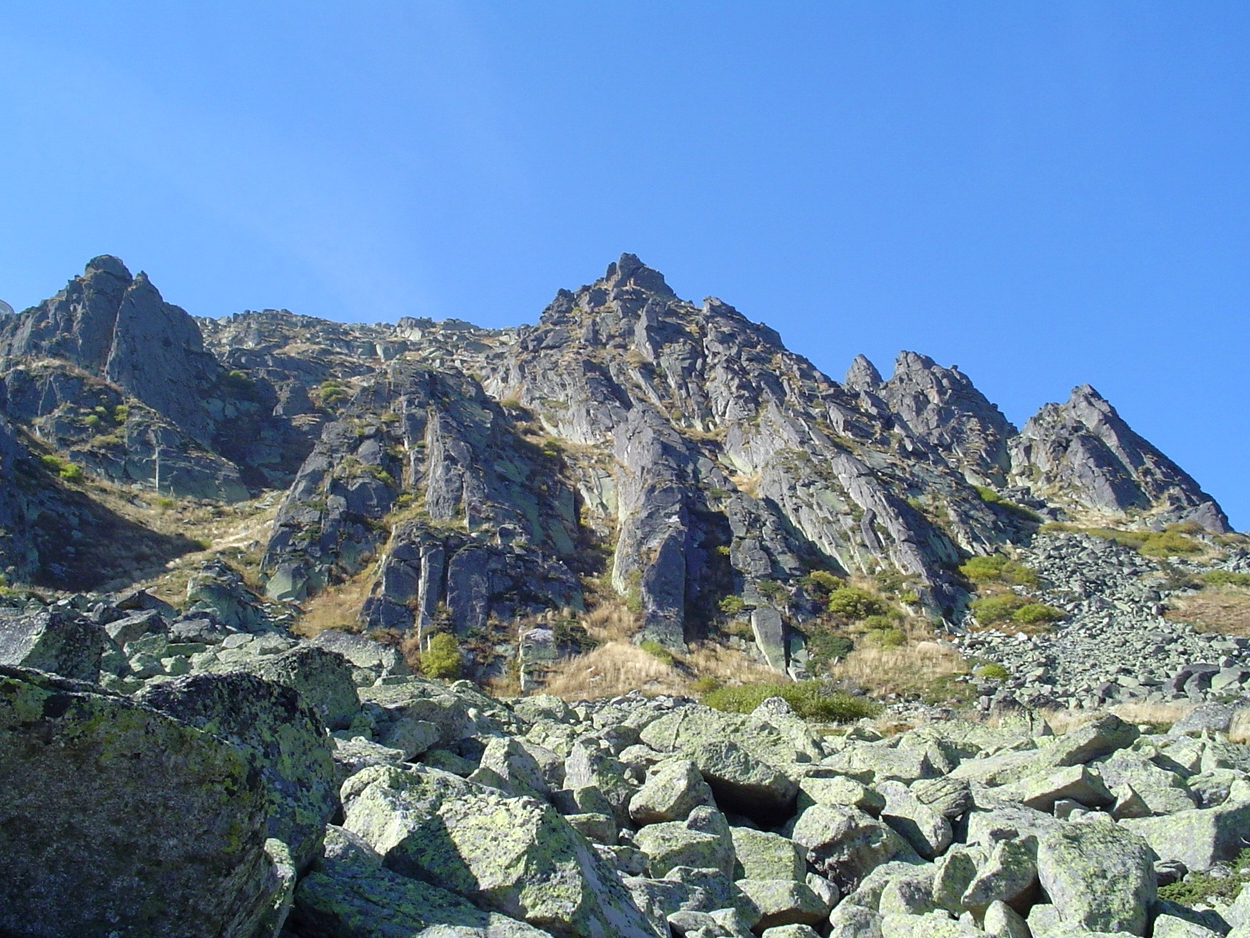
The eastern slopes of Golyam Rezen Peak

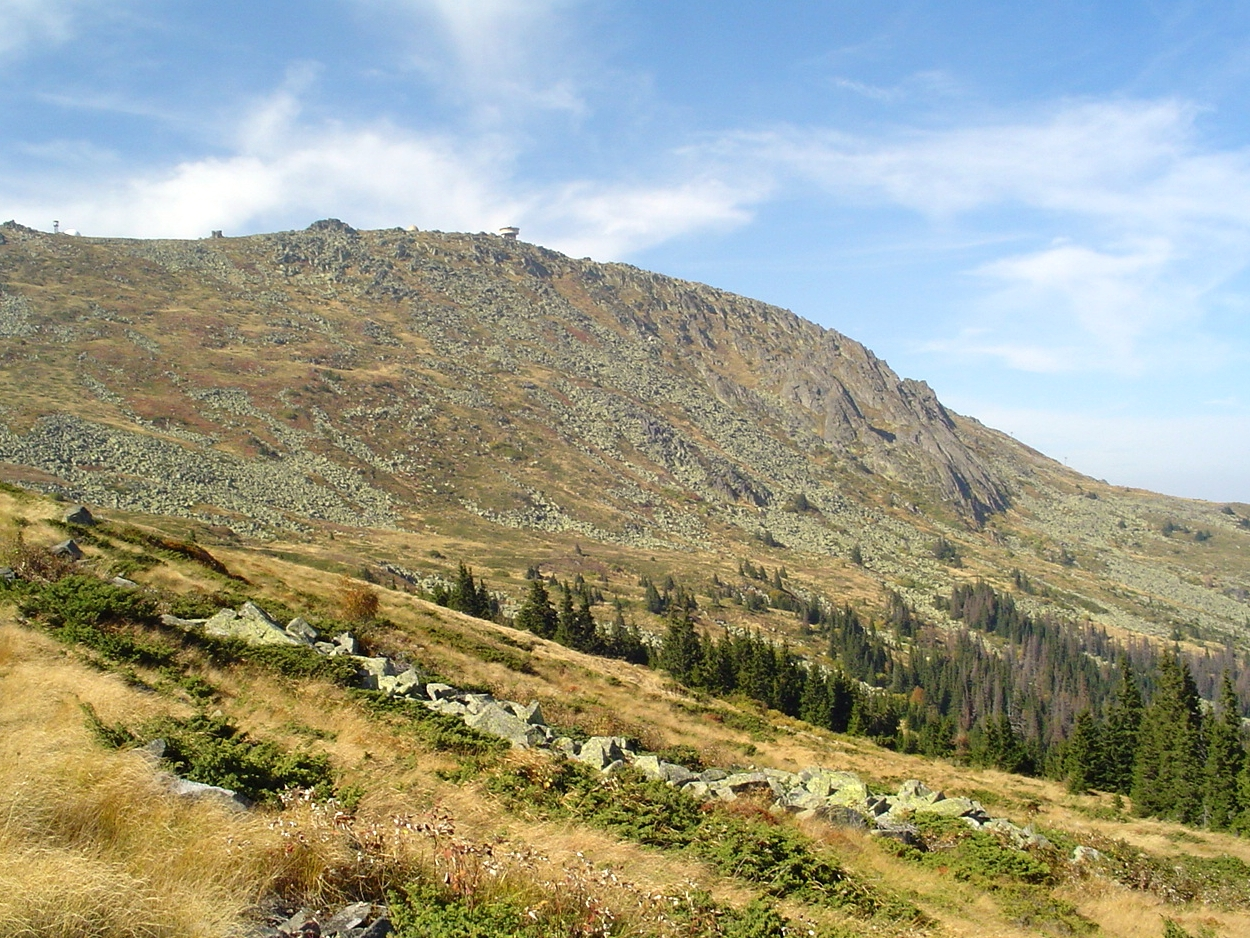
Golyam Rezen Peak surmounting the Subalpine zone of Bistrishko Branishte.

Golyam Rezen (Bulgarian: Голям Резен / ‘Big Slice’) is a peak on Vitosha Mountain in Bulgaria. Rising to 2,277 m, the peak is second to the mountain's summit Cherni Vrah situated 900 m to the west. Golyam Rezen hosts an Air Traffic Services facility, as well as military communications installations. The precipitous east slopes of the peak are a popular rock climbing site, overlooking Bistritsa River Valley in Bistrishko Branishte Biosphere Reserve.

Golyam Rezen is part of the water divide between Black Sea and Mediterranean Sea, with its northern and eastern slopes draining into Iskar River, and eventually into Danube River and Black Sea, and the southwestern slopes draining into Matnitsa River, flowing in turn into the Struma River and Aegean Sea.

The peak is easily accessible from the adjacent Malak Rezen Peak (2,191 m) situated 1.2 km to the north by east, and linked by chair lift to Aleko tourist centre. In winter, Golyam Rezen is also reached by a chair lift serving the Vitoshko Lale ski run descending from near the peak's summit down to Dervishka Bachiya site (1,500 m) in the valley of Yanchevska River, a tributary of Vitoshka Bistritsa River.

Rezen Knoll on Livingston Island in the South Shetland Islands, Antarctica is named for the peaks of Golyam Rezen and Malak Rezen.

== See also ==
- Malak Rezen
- Bistrishko Branishte
- Vitosha
- Vitoshka Bistritsa
