= Zheleznitsa, Sofia City Province =

Zheleznitsa
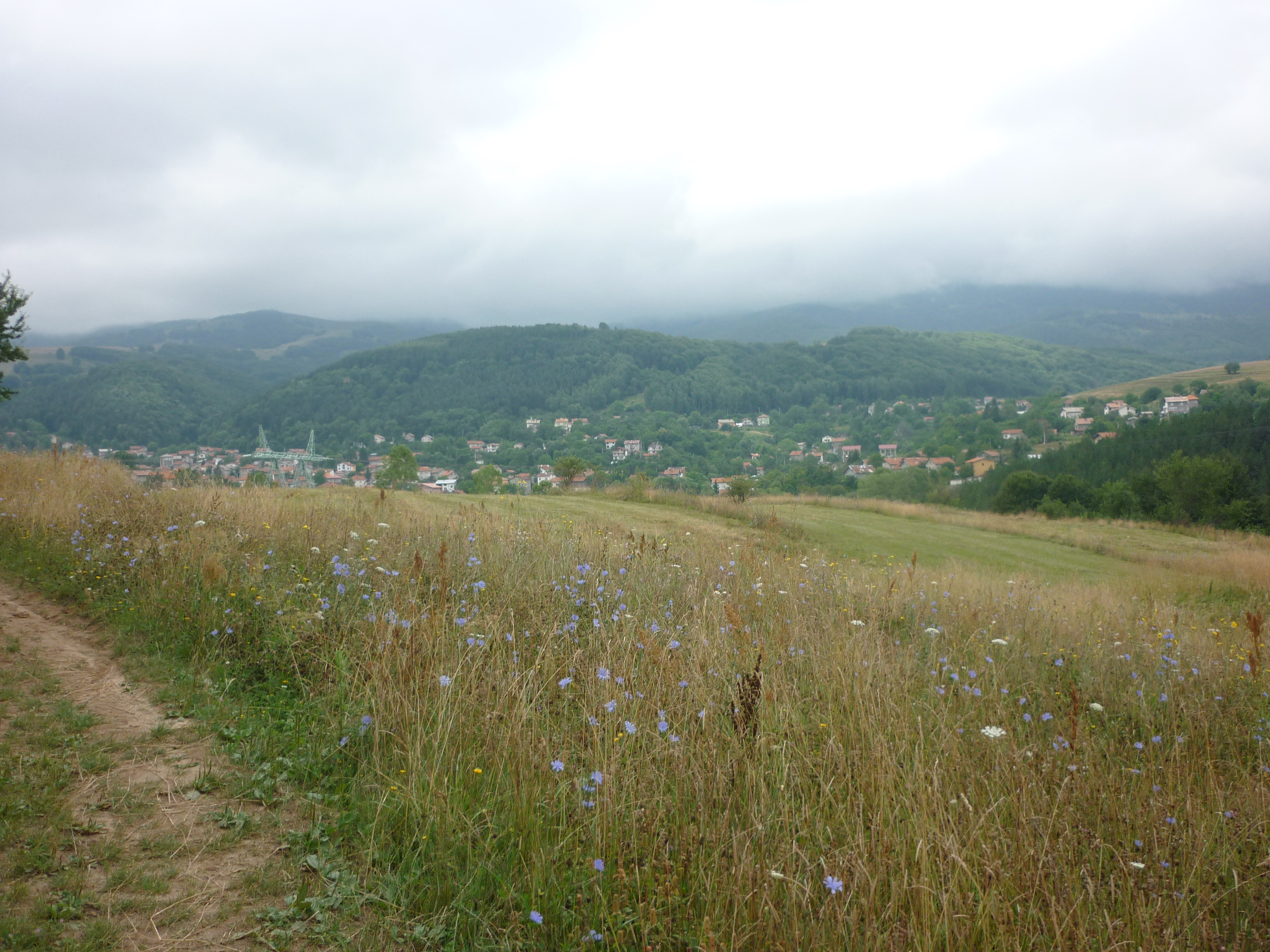

- Location of Zheleznitsa, Bulgaria
- Coordinates: 42°32′0″N 23°22′0″E
- Country: Bulgaria
- Provinces (Oblast): Sofia City Province
- Elevation: 1,023 m (3,356 ft)

Population (2024)
  - Total: 1,633
- Time zone: UTC+2 (EET)
  - Summer (DST): UTC+3 (EESTa)
- Postal Code: 1475
- Area codes: 02992 from Bulgaria, 003592992 from outside

Zheleznitsa (Bulgarian: Железница) is a large village in the Pancharevo district of the Bulgarian capital Sofia, located at 23 km to the south of the city center. As of 2024 it has 1,633 inhabitants.

== Geography ==
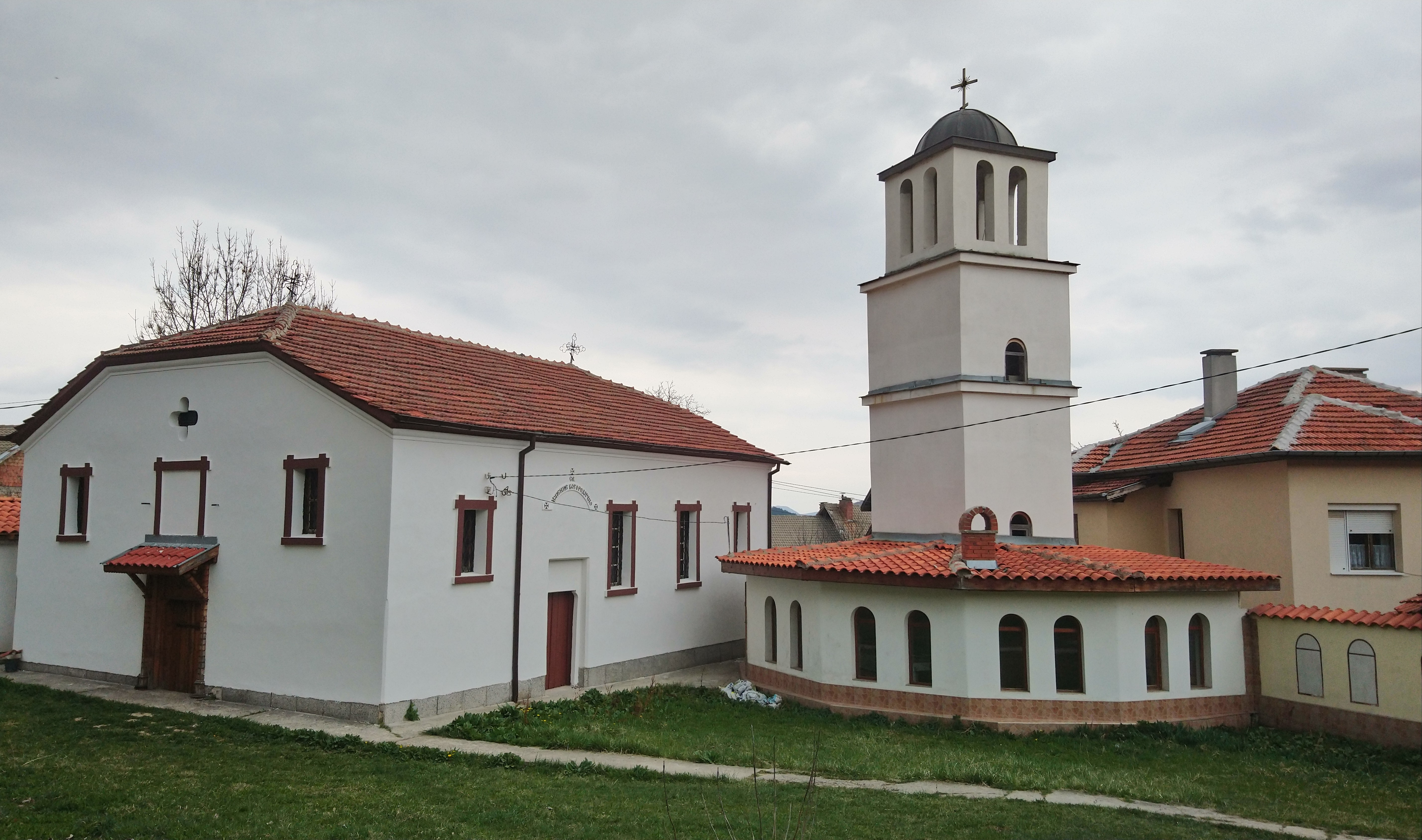
The Church of the Assumption of Virgin Mary

The village is situated at an altitude of 1,023 m on the eastern foothills of the Vitosha mountain range facing the Sofia Valley to the north. The Zheleznishka reka runs through the village and flows into the Iskar at the Pancharevo Gorge a few kilometers to the northeast. There are mineral springs with a total discharge of 1,000 L/min and temperature of 28–32 °С. It falls within the continental climatic zone with alpine influence from Vitosha. The soils are brown forest.

Administratively, Zheleznitsa is part of the Pancharevo district in the southern reaches of the Sofia City Province. It has a territory of 50.304 km^{2}. It is accessible via the third class III-181, which connects it to the neighbouring village of Bistritsa to the north in the direction of Sofia, and the village of Kovachevtsi to the south, situated in the Samokov Valley. Another road leads to the village of Plana some 11 km to the southeast, located in the Plana mountain range.

== History ==
The area of Zheleznitsa has been inhabited since antiquity, as testified by traces of Thracian sanctuaries. There are ruins of medieval Bulgarian churches and monasteries, which were destroyed by the Ottomans after the Bulgarian–Ottoman wars in the late 14th century. It was later settled by people from the homonymous village in the modern Blagoevgrad Province. The name of the village was first mentioned in Ottoman registers from 1728.

== Culture ==
The first school in the village was established before 1878. The Church of the Assumption of Virgin Mary dates from 1870. The local cultural center, known in Bulgarian as a chitalishte, was founded in 1926 and was named Probuda, meaning “awakening”. A few kilometers to the northeast are the ruins of the medieval fortress of Urvich and the Kokalyane Monastery. Zheleznitsa lies just outside the boundaries of Vitosha Nature Park. There are tourist trails leading to the mountain range and its highest summit Cherni Vrah (2,290 m).
