= Aleko, Vitosha =

Aleko
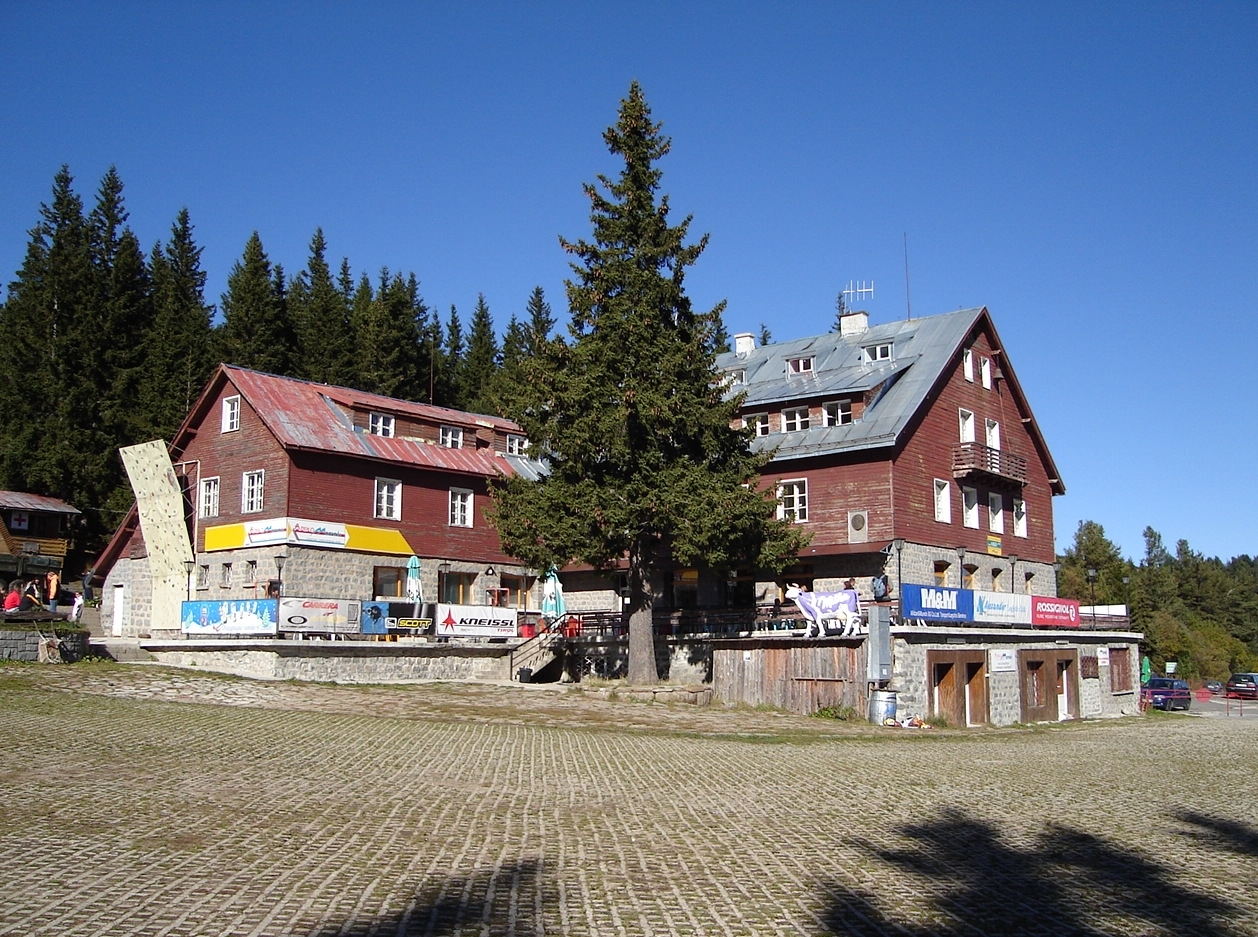
- Interactive map of the Aleko area

General information
- Location: Vitosha
- Coordinates: 42°34′57″N 23°17′32″E
- Elevation: 1,810 m (5,940 ft)
- Year built: 1924–1932
- Owner: Bulgarian Tourist Union

Website
- www.motensport.com/aleko

Aleko (Bulgarian: Алеко) is a site on Vitosha Mountain in Bulgaria situated at the northern foothills of Malak Rezen Peak (2191 m), in the watershed of Yanchevska River draining eastwards towards the village of Bistritsa, Sofia.

Aleko is the principal tourist and winter sports centre on Vitosha, offering accommodation at Aleko Chalet (1820 m) and few hotels, and several chairlifts, surface lifts and ski runs, cafeterias and restaurants, and ski and snowboard schools. The oldest and most popular ski run is Stenata (‘The Wall’), while the longest and most difficult one is ‘Vitoshko Lale’ originally built for the 1983 Winter Universiade held on Vitosha. Nowadays Aleko is among Bulgaria's top ski resorts together with Bansko in Pirin Mountain, Borovets in Rila Mountain, and Pamporovo in Rhodope Mountains.

The site is accessible by a 6.27 km gondola lift from Sofia's suburb of Simeonovo, and by road from the suburb of Dragalevtsi. Aleko is also the starting point of a number of tourist tracks leading to Cherni Vrah and further south to the villages of Chuypetlovo and Yarlovo, to Bistrishko Branishte Nature Reserve to the east, and to Zlatnite Mostove to the northwest.

A monument on the nearby Mecha Polyana (‘Bear Meadow’) commemorates Bulgaria's foreign minister Ivan Bashev who died in December 1971 in a blizzard that swept the area. Such accidents are not uncommon to Vitosha, with inadequately equipped or overconfident visitors overwhelmed by fast deteriorating weather. Aleko is a major base of the Mountain Rescue Service network on Vitosha Mountain.

Aleko takes its name from the homonymous chalet built in 1924 (second in Bulgaria after Skakavitsa Chalet in Rila Mountain), and named for the writer Aleko Konstantinov who organized the first group climbing of Cherni Vrah on August 27, 1895.

== Gallery ==
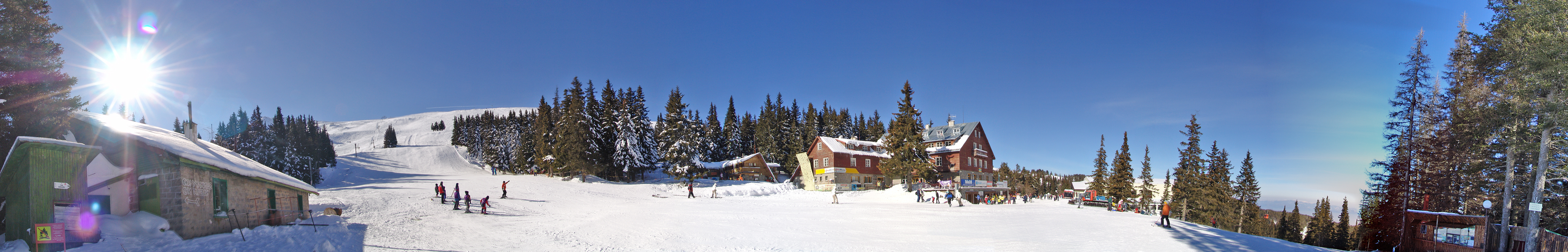
Aleko panorama
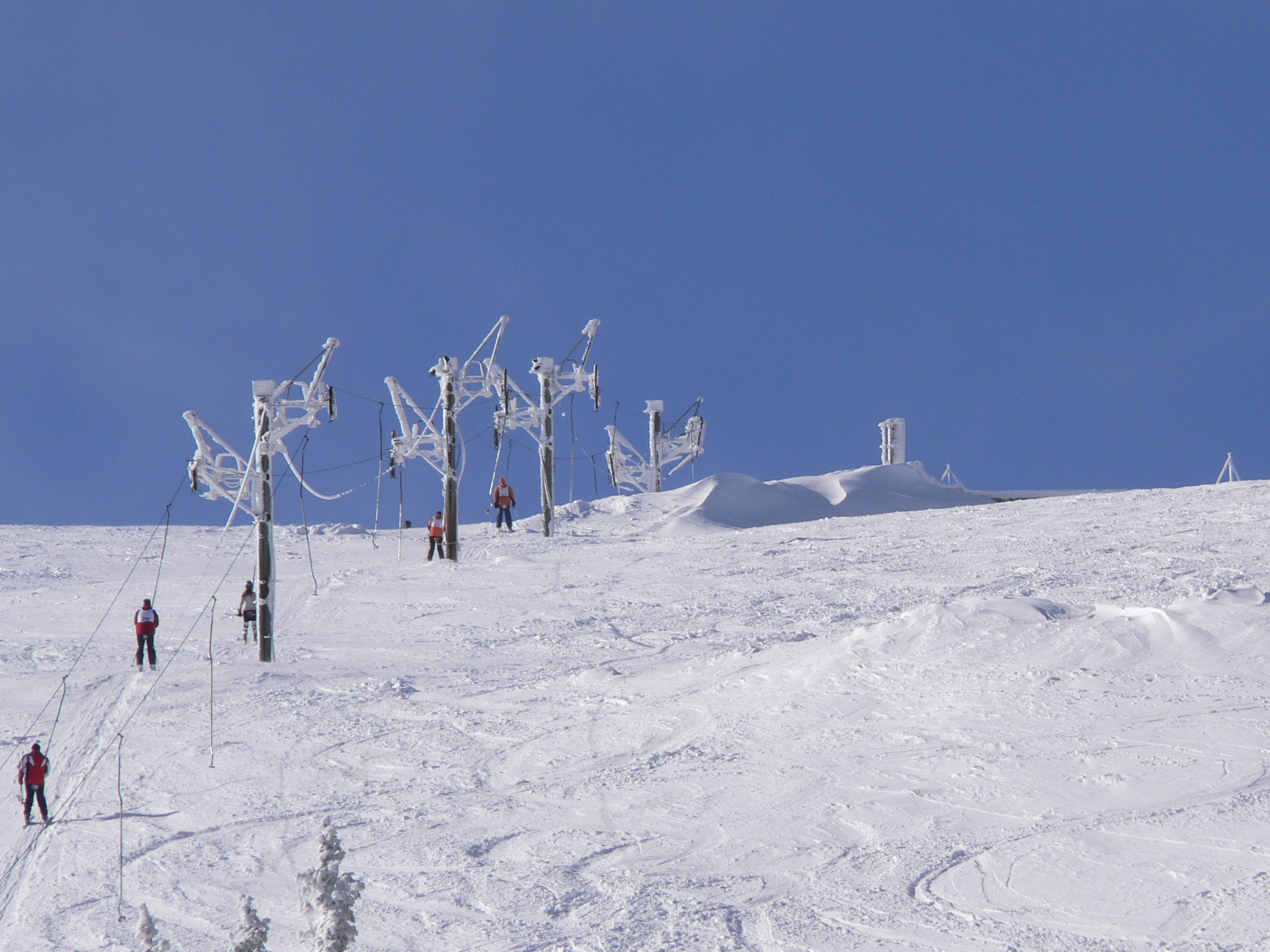
Stenata ski run at Aleko ski centre

== See also ==
- Vitosha
- Malak Rezen
- Cherni Vrah
