= Vitoshka Bistritsa =

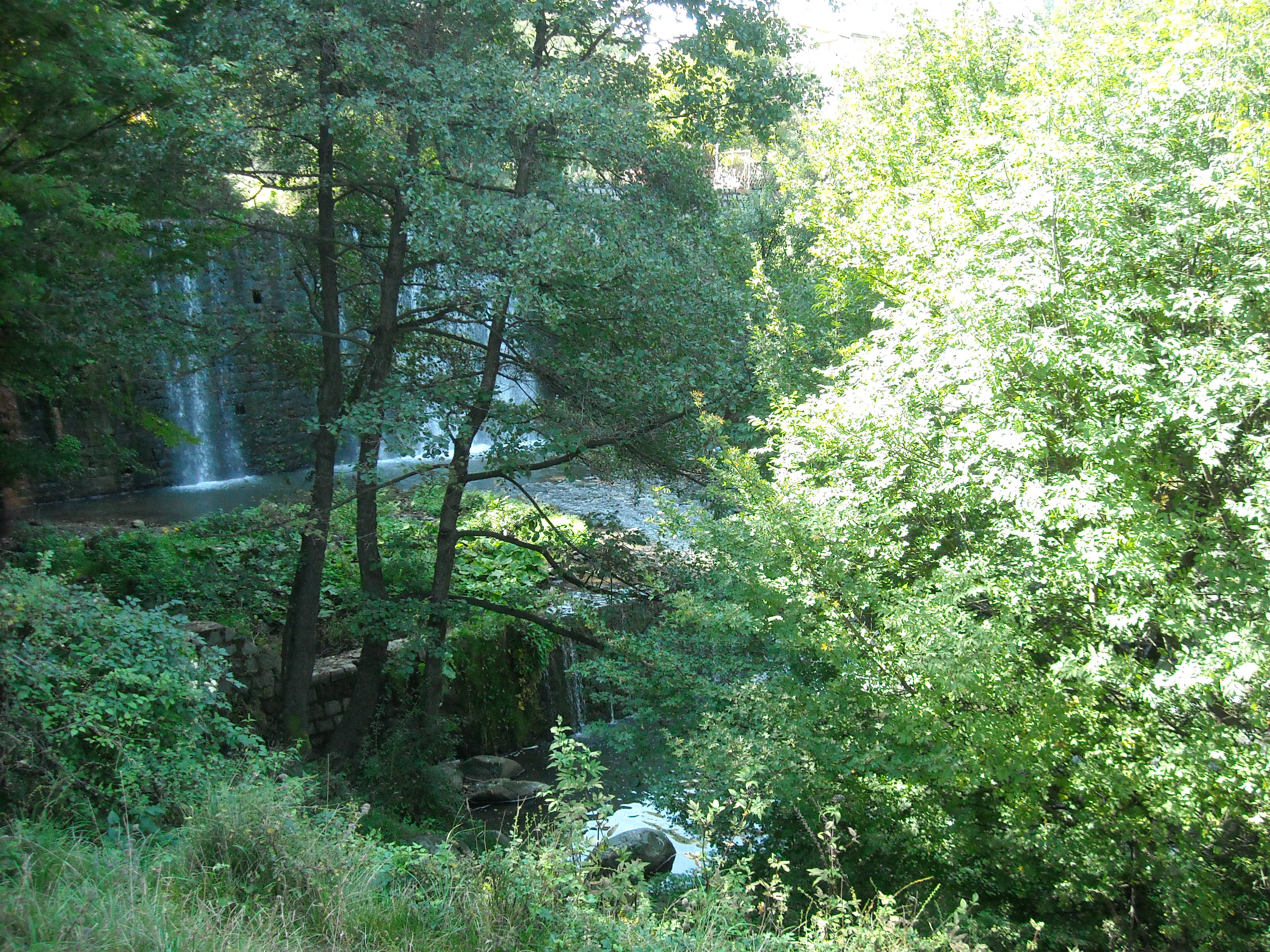
- Vitoshka Bistritsa, near Pancharevo

Location
- Country: Bulgaria

Physical characteristics
- Mouth
  - location: Iskar
  - coordinates: 42.5964°N 23.4153°E

Basin features
- Progression: Iskar→ Danube→ Black Sea

Bistritsa or Vitoshka Bistritsa (Bulgarian: Бистрица; Витошка Бистрица; Бистришка река), is a river in western Bulgaria, tributary of Iskar River.

It flows from the eastern slopes of Golyam Rezen Peak on Vitosha Mountain, crossing Bistrishko Branishte Nature Reserve, where it forms a small but beautiful waterfall, known as Samokovishteto, then crossing the villages of Bistritsa and Pancharevo to flow into Lake Pancharevo, near Sofia. Additional charm of the area offer several artificial waterfalls in the lower reaches of the river.
