= Cherni Vrah =

Summit of Vitosha Mountain in Bulgaria

Coordinates: 42°33′49″N 23°16′42″E

Highest point
- Elevation: 2,290 m (7,510 ft)
- Listing: Ribu

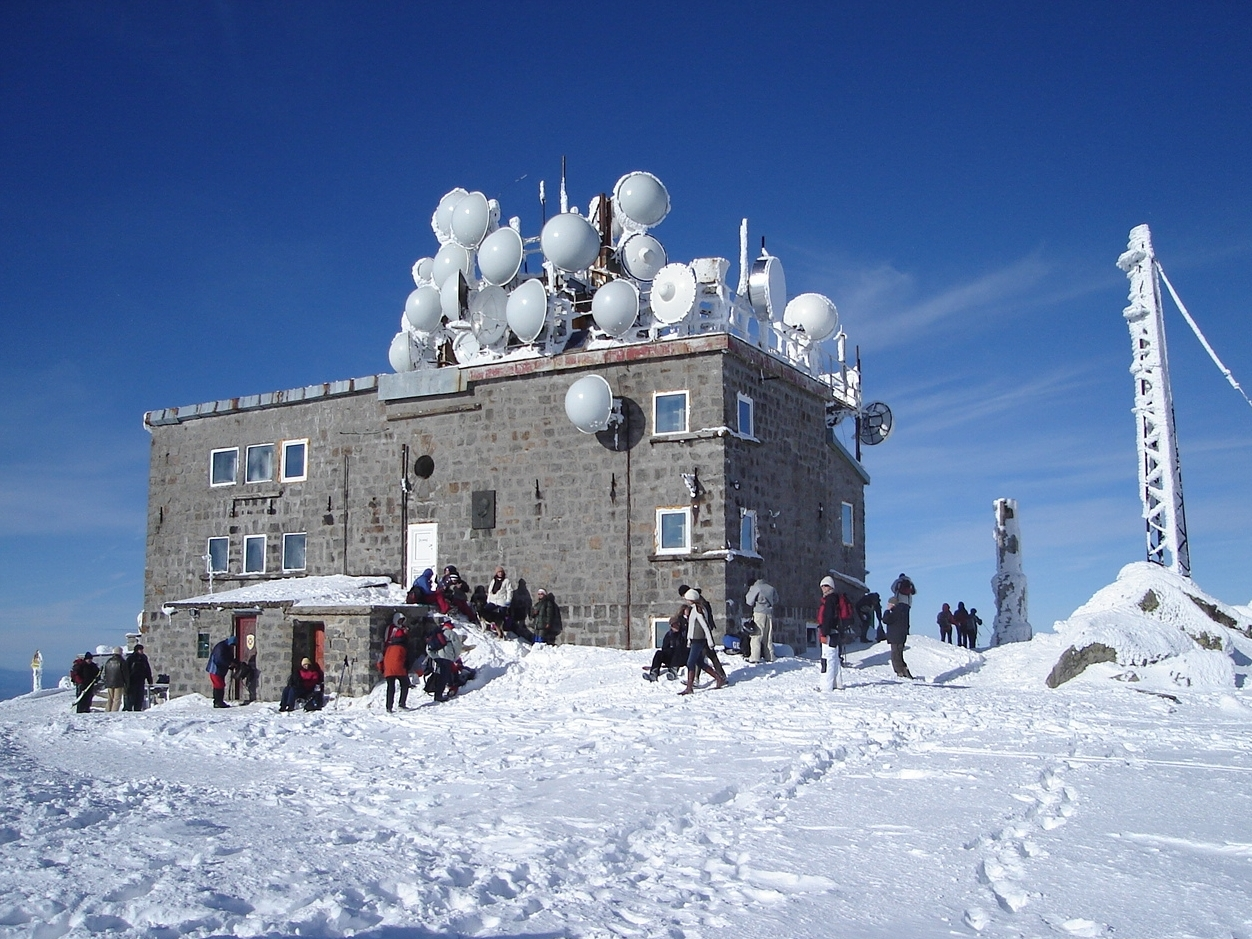
The weather station on Cherni Vrah in winter.

Cherni Vrah (Bulgarian: Черни връх [ˈt͡ʃɛrni vrɤx], "Black Peak") is the summit of Vitosha Mountain in Bulgaria. Rising to 2290 m, the peak is the fourth highest mountain summit in the country after Musala (2925 m, Rila Mountain), Vihren (2914 m, Pirin Mountain), and Botev Vrah (2376 m, Balkan Range).

Cherni Vrah is bounded to the northwest by Torfeno Branishte (Turf Nature Reserve) which — like the extensive adjacent territory to the south — is a no-go drinking water catchment area. Several major stone rivers are situated in the peak's vicinity, occupying the upper courses of Vladayska and Boyanska Rivers to the north, and Struma River to the south.

The peak is part of the water divide between Black Sea and Mediterranean Sea, its northern slopes draining into Iskar River, and eventually into Danube River and Black Sea, and the southern slopes draining into Matnitsa River, flowing in turn into Struma River and Aegean Sea.

Cherni Vrah hosts a weather station built in 1935, one year after the mountain became the oldest national park on the Balkans. The station provides refuge in bad weather (no tourist accommodation though), and has a well supplied cafeteria offering hot meals. A Mountain Rescue Service team is based on the peak too. The nearest mountain chalets are Aleko Chalet situated 3 km to the north-northeast (1810 m, major ski and snowboard centre accessible by gondola lift from Simeonovo, Sofia), and Kumata Chalet (1725 m) situated 5.5 km to the northwest. Ski paths link Cherni Vrah to Aleko and Kumata areas in winter, and a ski run on the northern slope of the peak itself is served by a 600-m surface lift.

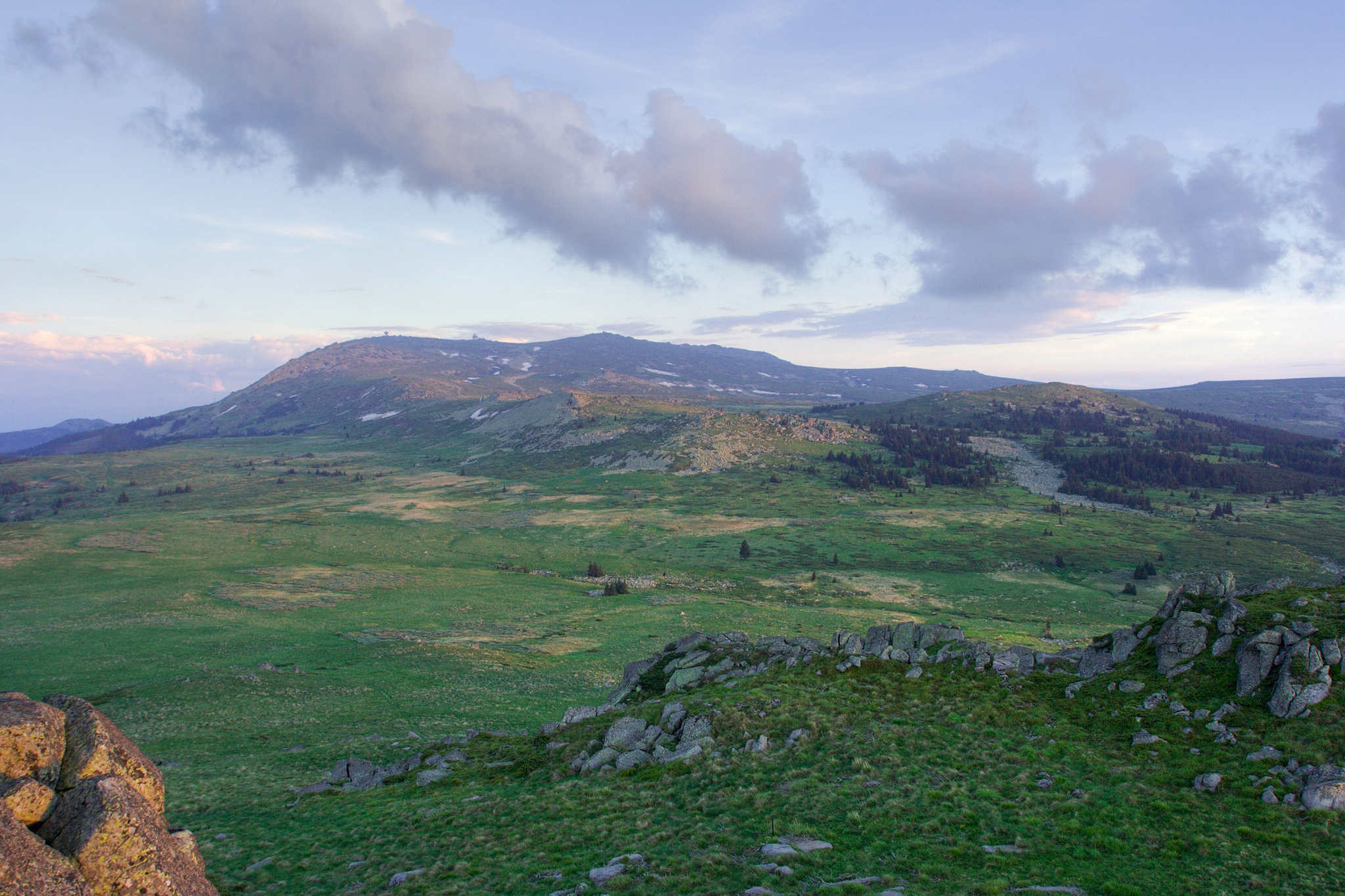
Torfeno Branishte Nature Reserve from Vrah Ushite (‘Ears Peak’); Cherni Vrah in the background.

With its annual average wind speed of 9.3 m/s Cherni Vrah is the second most windy peak in Bulgaria after Murgash Peak in the Balkan Range (10.3 m/s).

The legend holds it that Cherni Vrah was climbed as early as 181 B.C. by King Philip V of Macedon. Nowadays, the easiest access to the peak is by a 1.4-km track from the upper station of Romanski chair lift situated on Malak Rezen Peak (2191 m).

Cherni Vrah has a special place in Bulgarian tourism. Thanks to its proximity to Sofia the peak is by far the most visited mountain summit in the country, attracting tens of thousands of visitors annually. The first group of tourists to climb the peak involved 300 people, among them the contemporary doyen of Bulgarian literature Ivan Vazov, and was led by another famous Bulgarian writer, Aleko Konstantinov. The event took place on August 27, 1895, and annual tourist rallies are held on Cherni Vrah on that date considered the birthday of Bulgarian tourist movement.

The etymology of the name Cherni Vrah (Black Peak) is uncertain. Popularly, it is attributed to the black colour of the conspicuous rock formations dominating the peak's tip. Another belief holds it that the name derived from the darker appearance the peak presumably had in the past, when the Subalpine zone of Vitosha used to be overgrown by mountain pine (Pinus mugo) that was burnt in the Middle Ages to expand sheep pastures. Nowadays only few isolated mountain pine communities have survived in the vicinity of Cherni Vrah, and their process of expansion and recovery is very slow.

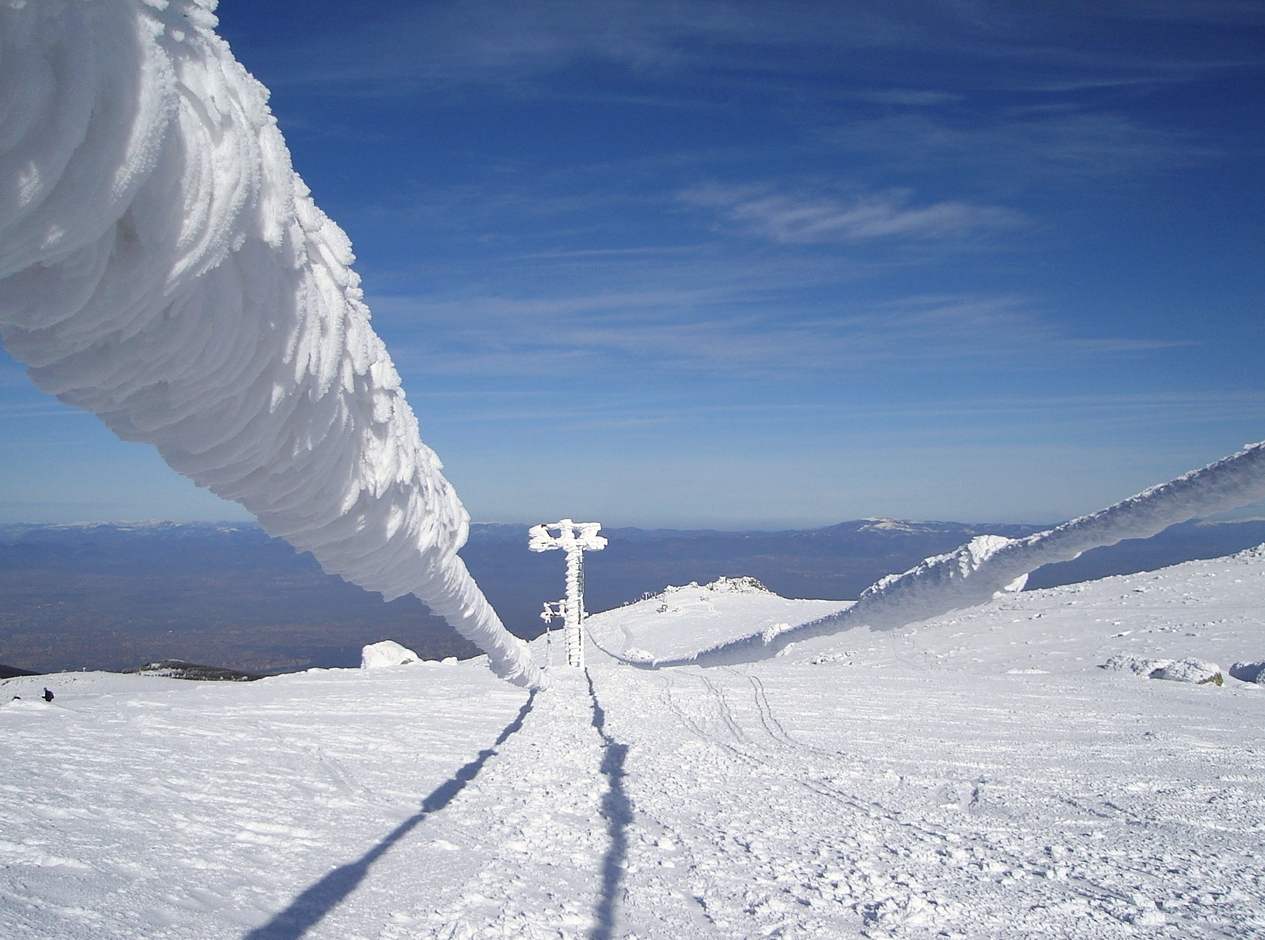
Down the ski run on Cherni Vrah's northern slope, with Malak Rezen Peak in the background; Murgash Peak, Balkan Range on the horizon.

== Climate ==
Cherni Vrah has a tundra climate, with an average annual temperature of 0,3C. For the period 1931-1970 the lowest recorded temperature was -27,4C, while the highest - +22,7C.

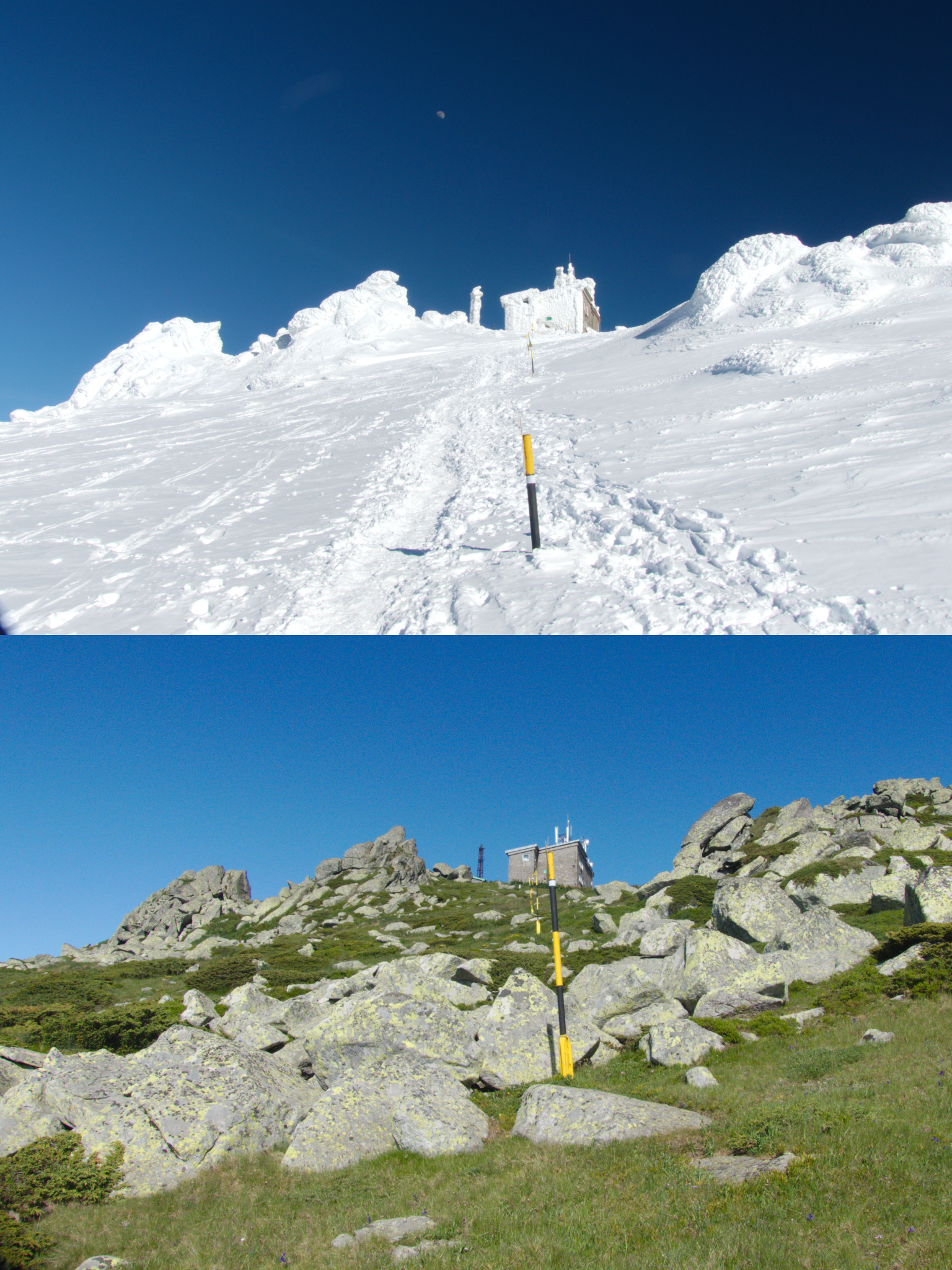
The path towards the hut on Cherny Vrah in Winter and in Summer

Climate data for Cherni Vrah Peak (2000-)
Month	Jan	Feb	Mar	Apr	May	Jun	Jul	Aug	Sep	Oct	Nov	Dec	Year
Record high °C (°F)	8.0 (46.4)	7.5 (45.5)	10.8 (51.4)	14 (57)	19 (66)	20.4 (68.7)	21.7 (71.1)	22.7 (72.9)	22.5 (72.5)	18 (64)	13.9 (57.0)	10.8 (51.4)	22.7 (72.9)
Mean daily maximum °C (°F)	−5.2 (22.6)	−5 (23)	−3.2 (26.2)	1 (34)	5.5 (41.9)	9.7 (49.5)	12.2 (54.0)	12.5 (54.5)	9.4 (48.9)	4.7 (40.5)	0.6 (33.1)	−3.5 (25.7)	3.2 (37.8)
Daily mean °C (°F)	−7.4 (18.7)	−7.9 (17.8)	−6 (21)	−1.8 (28.8)	2.9 (37.2)	6.5 (43.7)	8.8 (47.8)	9 (48)	6 (43)	2 (36)	−2 (28)	−5.9 (21.4)	0.3 (32.5)
Mean daily minimum °C (°F)	−9.6 (14.7)	−10.6 (12.9)	−8.9 (16.0)	−4.3 (24.3)	0.2 (32.4)	3.5 (38.3)	5.7 (42.3)	5.8 (42.4)	3 (37)	−0.8 (30.6)	−4.5 (23.9)	−8.4 (16.9)	−2.5 (27.5)
Record low °C (°F)	−27.4 (−17.3)	−26.2 (−15.2)	−25.5 (−13.9)	−16.6 (2.1)	−12 (10)	−7.8 (18.0)	−3.8 (25.2)	−4.9 (23.2)	−9.2 (15.4)	−14.8 (5.4)	−24.1 (−11.4)	−27 (−17)	−27.4 (−17.3)
Average precipitation mm (inches)	103 (4.1)	95 (3.7)	96 (3.8)	98 (3.9)	118 (4.6)	142 (5.6)	98 (3.9)	84 (3.3)	71 (2.8)	85 (3.3)	86 (3.4)	99 (3.9)	1,175 (46.3)
Source: Stringmeteo.com

== See also ==
- Torfeno Branishte
- Vitosha
- Stone rivers
- Aleko Konstantinov
