= Bistritsa, Sofia =

Bistritsa Бистрица
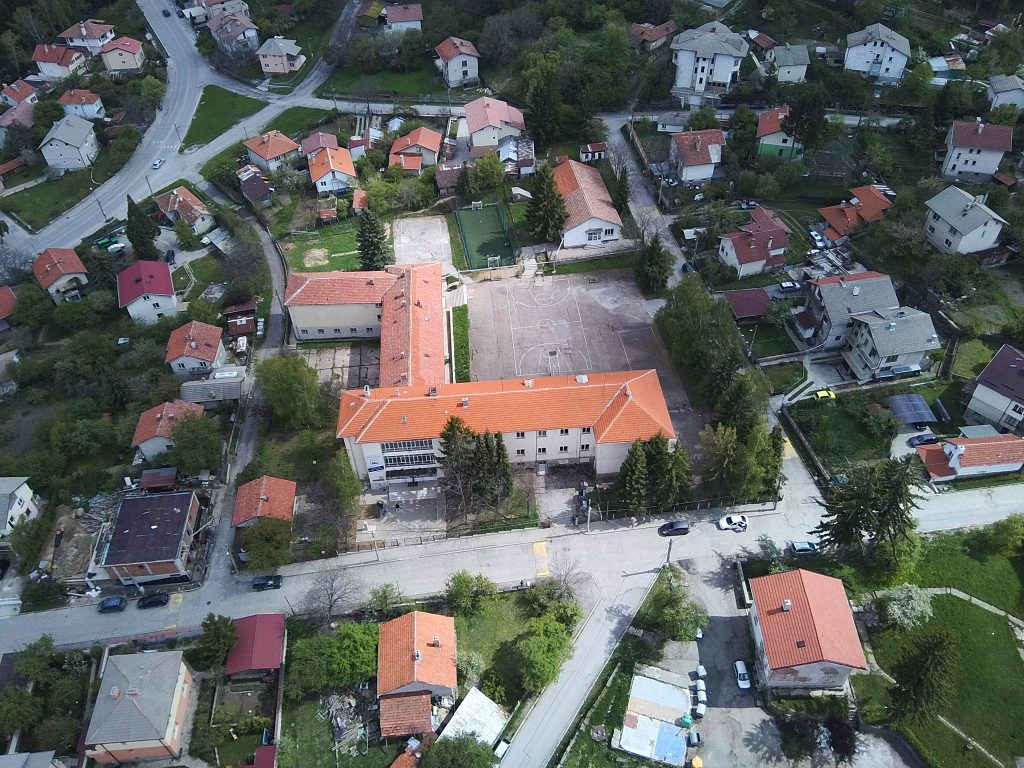

- Location of Bistritsa, Bulgaria
- Coordinates: 42°35′10″N 23°21′36″E
- Country: Bulgaria
- Provinces (Oblast): Sofia City Province
- Elevation: 950 m (3,120 ft)

Population (2024)
  - Total: 5,315
- Time zone: UTC+2 (EET)
  - Summer (DST): UTC+3 (EEST)
- Postal Code: 1444
- Area codes: 02992 from Bulgaria, 003592992 from outside

Bistritsa (Bulgarian: Бистрица) is a large village in the Pancharevo district of the Bulgarian capital Sofia, located approximately 15 km south of the city center. As of 2024 it has 5,315 inhabitants.

== Geography ==
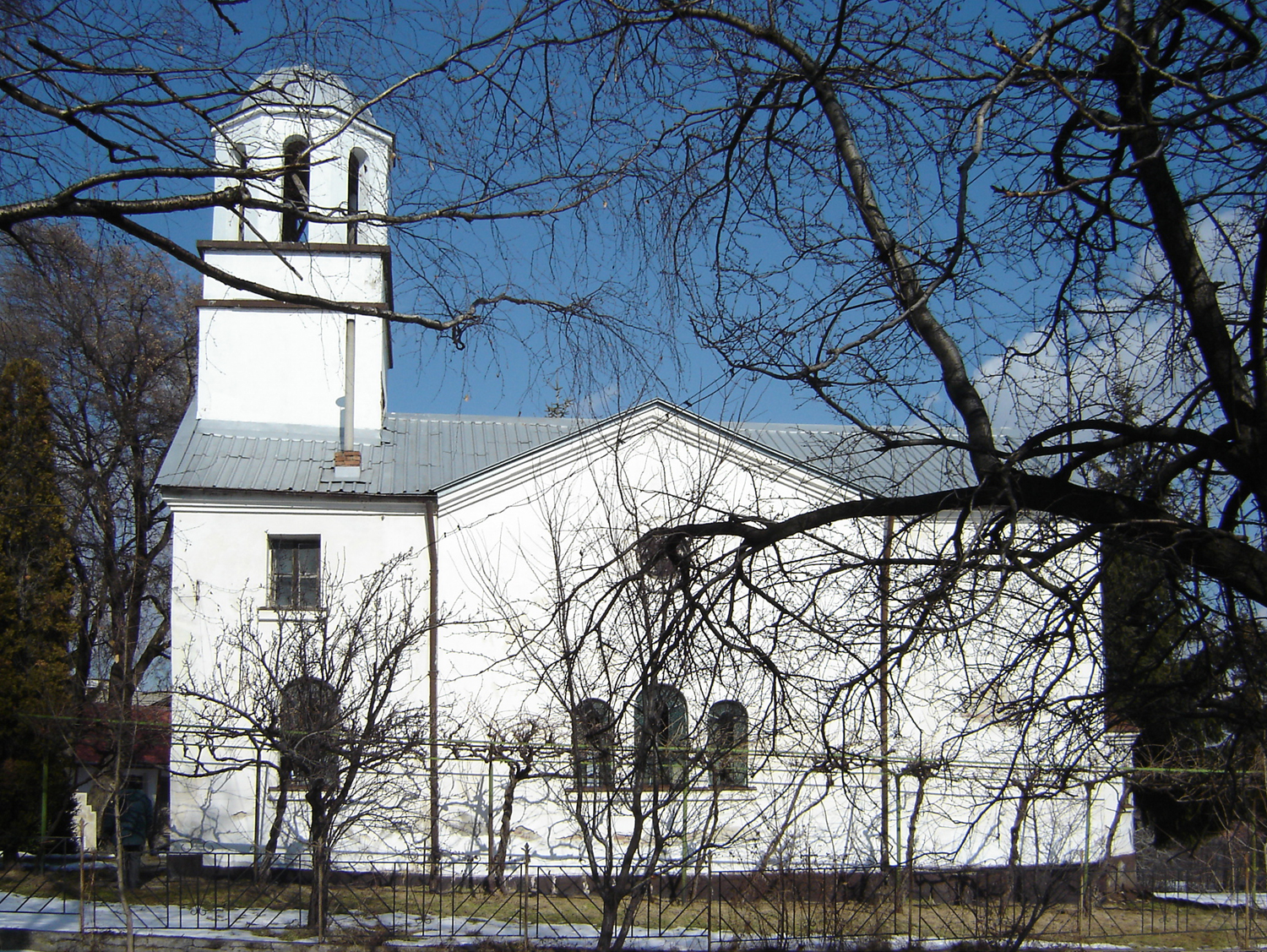
Church of St Archangel Michael

The village is situated at an altitude of 950 m on the northeastern foothills of the Vitosha mountain range facing the Sofia Valley to the north. The rivers Yanchovska and Stara reka merge in the village to form the Vitoshka Bistritsa, which flows into the Iskar at Lake Pancharevo a few kilometers to the east. It falls within the transitional continental climatic zone with alpine influence from Vitosha. The soils are cinnamon forest.

Administratively, Bistritsa is part of the Pancharevo district in the southern part of the Sofia City Province. It has a territory of 52.964 km^{2}, or 4% of the province. The village lies between the Simeonovo neighbourhood of Sofia to the northwest, reaches the limits of the Sofia Ring Road to the north, the village of Pancharevo to the east, and the village of Zheleznitsa to the south. It is an affluent area for low-rise developments with several villa zones.

== History ==
Bistritsa is among the oldest villages in the area of Vitosha. Its name was marked in maps of the Second Bulgarian Empire as a fortress. There is a medieval monastery which was destroyed by the Ottomans during the Bulgarian–Ottoman wars in the late 14th century. Between 1936 and 1946 the church of the monastery was rebuilt. During these works a medieval grave has been excavated. It had been robbed and the only discovery was a copper coin from Emperor Ivan Shishman (r. 1371–1395).

== Culture ==
The first school in the village was established in 1865. The Church of St George dates from 1883. Other Christian temples include the Church of St Archangel Michael, the Monastery of St Anna and St Joachim, and the Monastery of St Petka. The local cultural center, known in Bulgarian as a chitalishte, was founded in 1909 and was named after the medieval Bulgarian monarch and saint Boris I.

Bistritsa is home to the famous "Bistritsa Babi" ("grannies"), a traditional folklore ensemble consisting of elderly women, their daughters and granddaughters, who have been classified as "living treasures" by UNESCO and have been included in Intangible Cultural Heritage of Humanity since 2008.
