= Vladaya =

Vladaya Владая
- Village
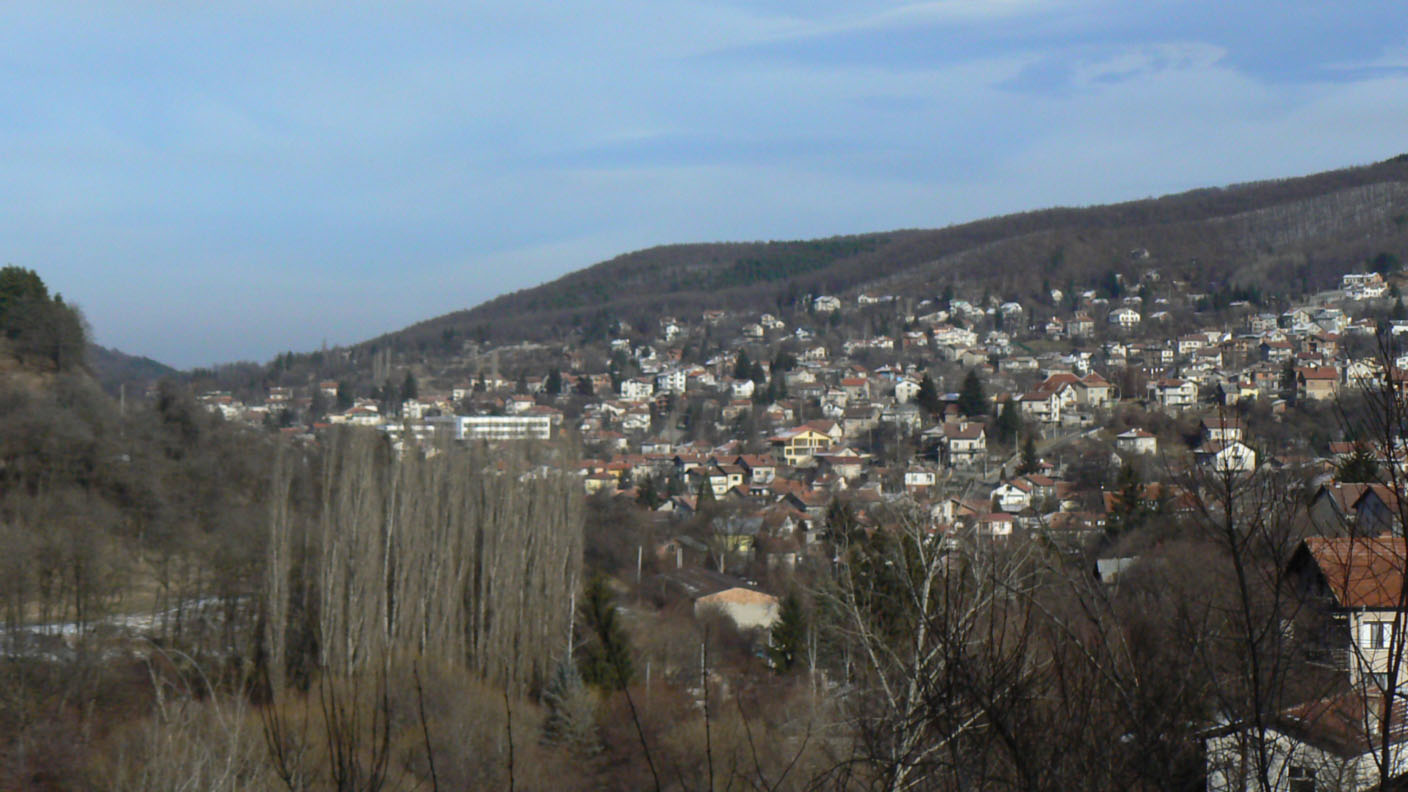
- Vladaya with Vitosha Mountain on the right and Lyulin on the left

- Location of Vladaya
- Coordinates: 42°38′N 23°12′E
- Country: Bulgaria
- Province (Oblast): Sofia City
- Named as "Vladaya": 13th century

Government
  - Mayor: Tsvetanka Zdravkova (I)
- Elevation: 850 m (2,790 ft)

Population (2020)
  - Total: 3,484
- Time zone: UTC+2 (EET)
- Postal Code: 1641
- Area code: (+359) 02 999
- Car plates: C, CA, CB
- Website: https://www.raionvitosha.eu

Vladaya (Bulgarian: Владая, pronounced [vɫɐˈdajɐ]) is a village on the Vitosha and Lyulin mountains in western Bulgaria at an altitude of about 1000 m. In the 2011 census in Vladaya were counted 4043 residents, which makes it the tenth largest village in Bulgaria. Administratively, it is part of the Vitosha District of Stolichna Municipality in the southwestern part of the Sofia City Province.

== Geography and population ==
The village is landlocked from valleys, situated comparatively highly in the mountains where the mountain ranges of Vitosha and Lyulin meet at the Vladaya River. However, only a small neighborhood falls within Lyulin and the village is mostly situated on the northwestern parts of Vitosha. Vladaya is situated between the Knyazhevo neighbourhood of the Bulgarian capital Sofia to the northeast and the village of Marchaevo to the southwest.

It lies along the first class I-6 road Gyueshevo–Pernik–Sofia–Burgas and railway line No. 5 Sofia–Blagoevgrad–Kulata.

The population consists mainly of Bulgarians. There is a small gypsy minority living in the village.

== History ==
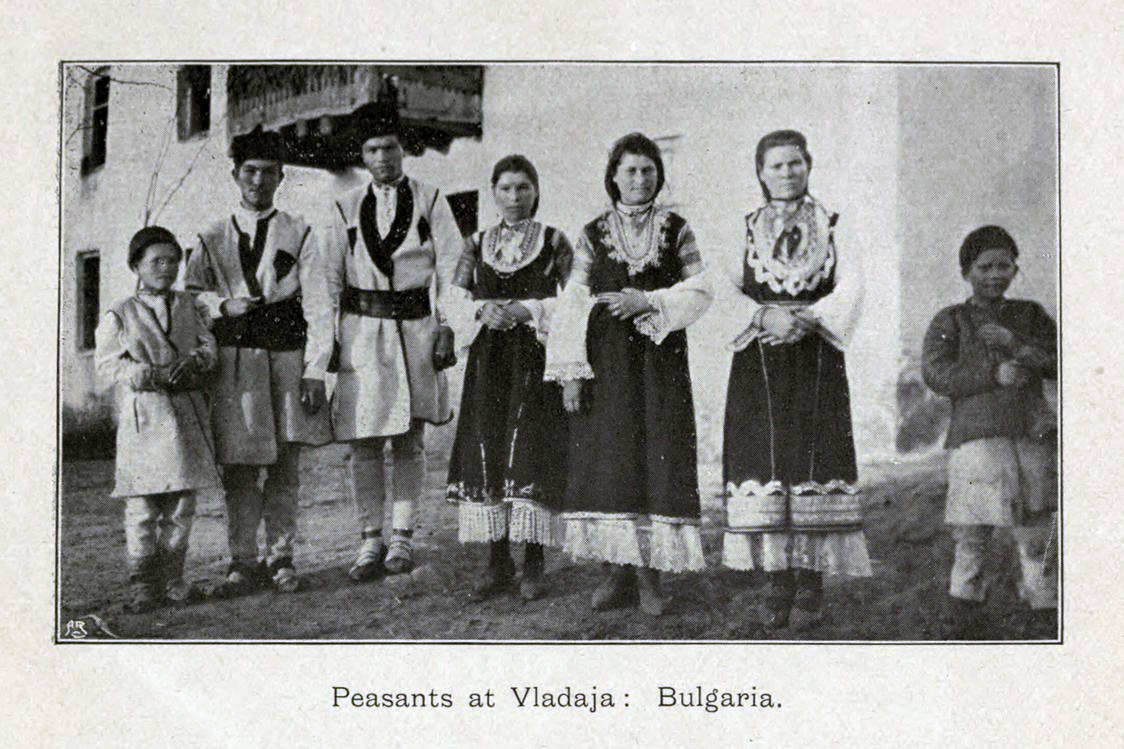
Vladayan peasants from 1906

The history of the village reflects the fate of the nearby Sofia city. It is believed that there has been a settlement on the site since ancient eras. The first known inhabitants of the area were Thracian tribes. The settlement was part of numerous kingdoms and empires, including the Thracian and Macedon kingdoms, Roman, Byzantine, Bulgarian and Ottoman Empires. Over the centuries, different tribes and peoples invaded the area - Ancient Macedonians, Celts, Romans, Goths, Bulgarians and Turks. There is a legend and two alternative theories about the name of the village. According to the first legend, the village's name dates back the Second Bulgarian Empire (1185 - 1396) and was named after one of the three daughters of the tsar called Vladaya. Her sisters' names - Boyana and Yana gave name to other settlements in the area. The alternative theory is that the name is derived from the Bulgarian word "владей" [vladey] which literary means own in imperative, the other alternative theory is that it is simply derived from villa. Etymological studies derive it from the genitive and accusative form of the Bulgarian personal name Vladay. The name of Vladaya was first attested in 1576 as Viladay or Vladay.

== Landmarks ==
- Tourist track Zlatnite Mostove"
- Tourist track "Tihia kat"
- Sveta Petka monastery
- Sveti Ivan Rilski monument
- Monument of the soldiers killed in the soldier rebellion in 1918
- Monument of Lessya Ukrainka - a Ukrainian poet

== Honour ==
Vladaya Saddle on Livingston Island in the South Shetland Islands, Antarctica is named after Vladaya.
