= Selimitsa =

Coordinates: 42°34′18″N 23°14′26″E

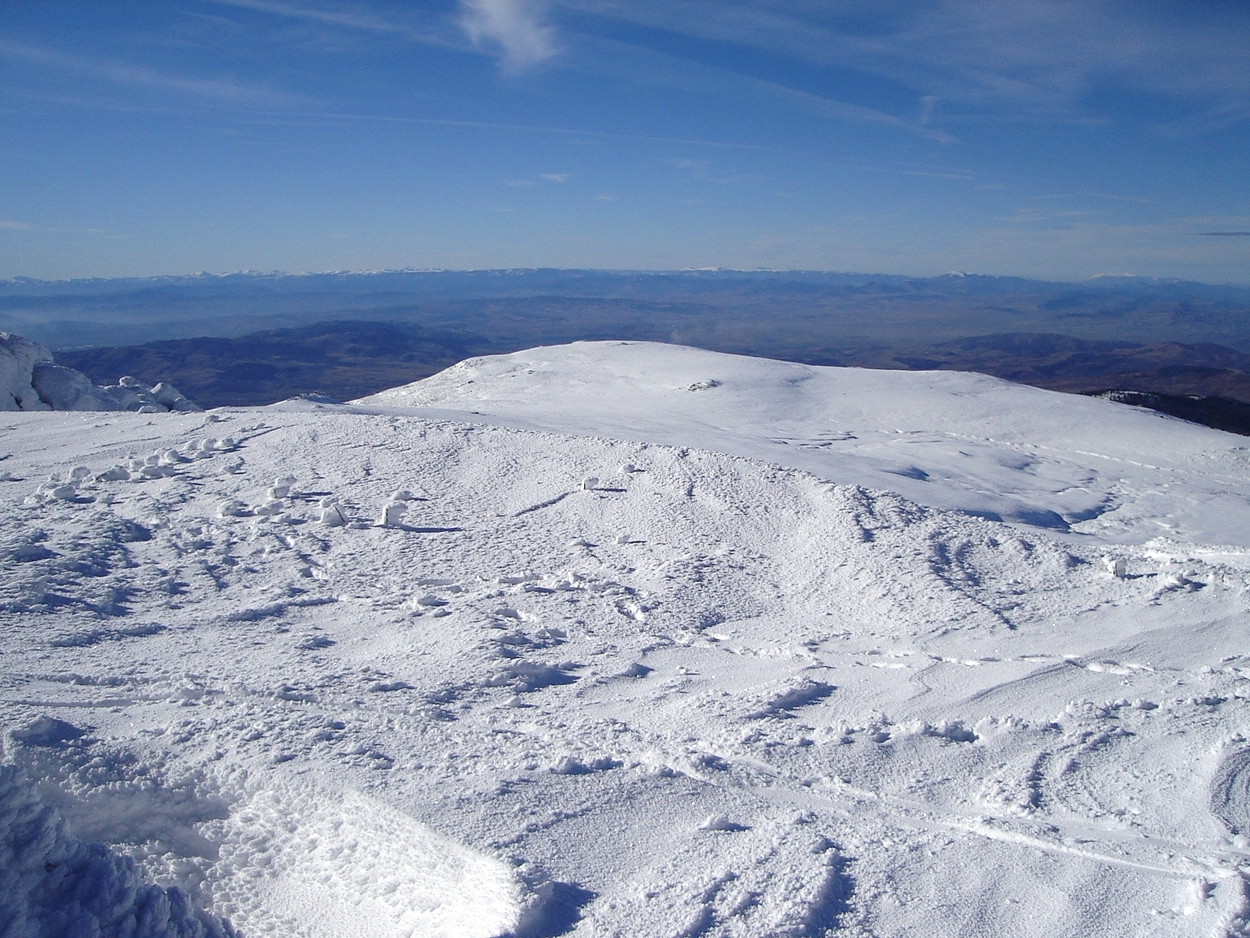
Selimitsa Peak from Cherni Vrah

Selimitsa (Bulgarian: Селимица [sɛˈlimit͡sɐ]) is a peak rising to 2,041 m west of Torfeno Branishte Nature Reserve in northwestern Vitosha Mountain in Bulgaria. The northern slopes of the peak are occupied by the ski runs of Konyarnika Ski Centre. Linked by tracks to Kumata Chalet and Zlatnite Mostove Tourist Centre to the north, Selimitsa Chalet, Kladnitsa Monastery and Kladnitsa Village to the west, Matnitsa River valley and Chuypetlovo Village to the south, and the mountain's summit Cherni Vrah to the east.

== See also ==
- Vitosha
