= Kamen Del =

Coordinates: 42°36′44″N 23°16′34″E

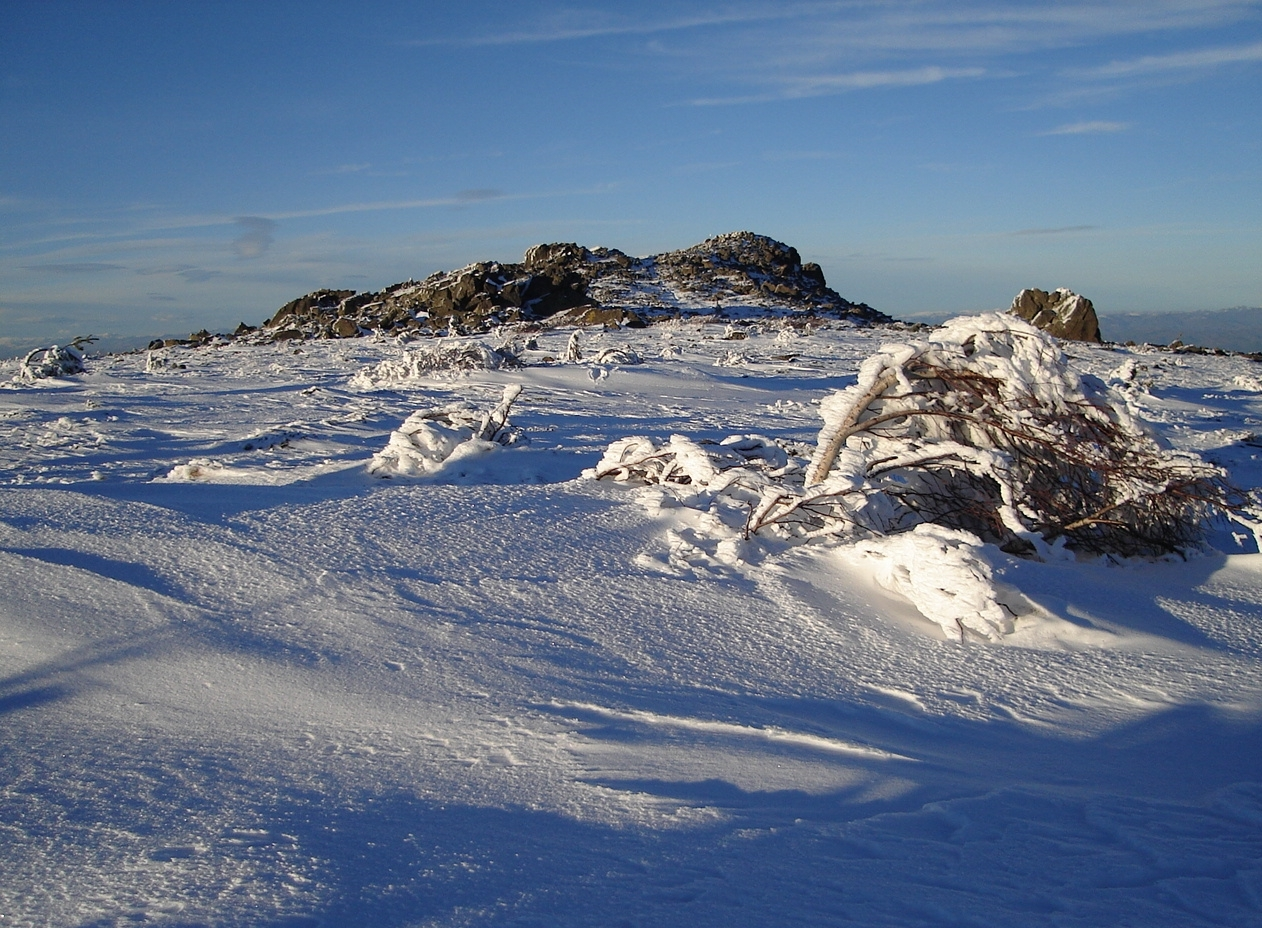
Kamen Del from the col linking it to Ushite Peak

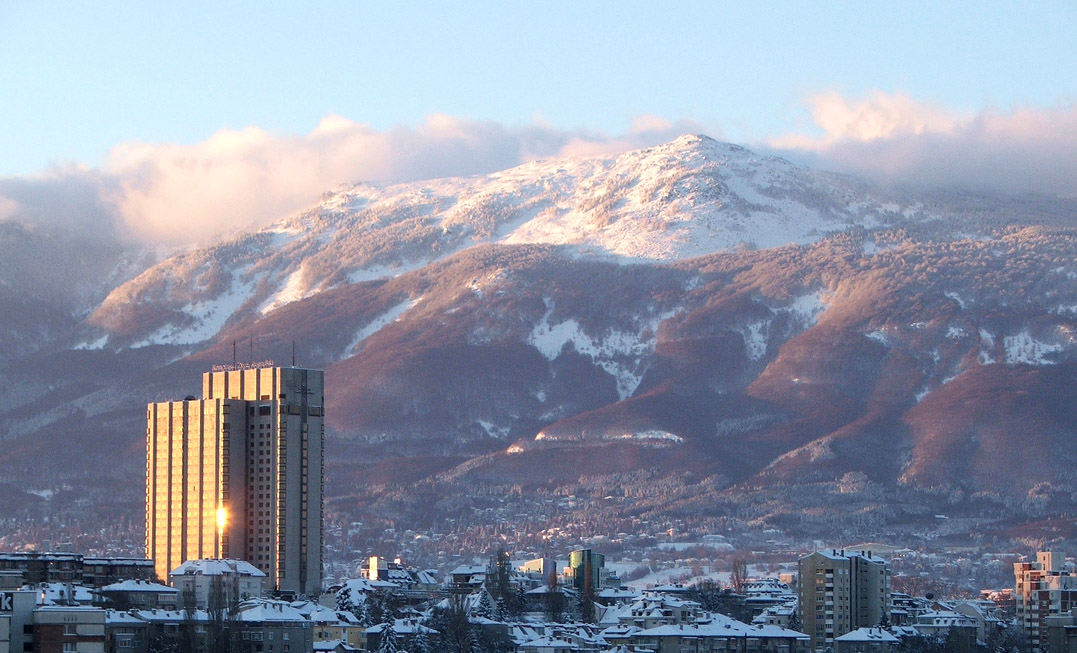
Kamen Del from Sofia

Kamen Del (Bulgarian: Камен Дел / ‘Stone Piece’) is a peak on Vitosha Mountain in Bulgaria. Rising to 1,862 metres (6,109 ft), and surmounting the city of Sofia, it is the most conspicuous peak seen from the Bulgarian capital. Its northern slope is partly covered by an extensive one by one km stone sea. A flat col links Kamen Del to Ushite Peak 1,960 metres (6,430 ft) to the south, hosting a small refuge on the track between Aleko and Zlatnite Mostove, the two most popular tourist sites on Vitosha.

== See also ==
- Ushite Peak
- Vitosha
