= Ushite Peak =

Mountain in Bulgaria

Coordinates: 42°36′42″N 23°16′13″E

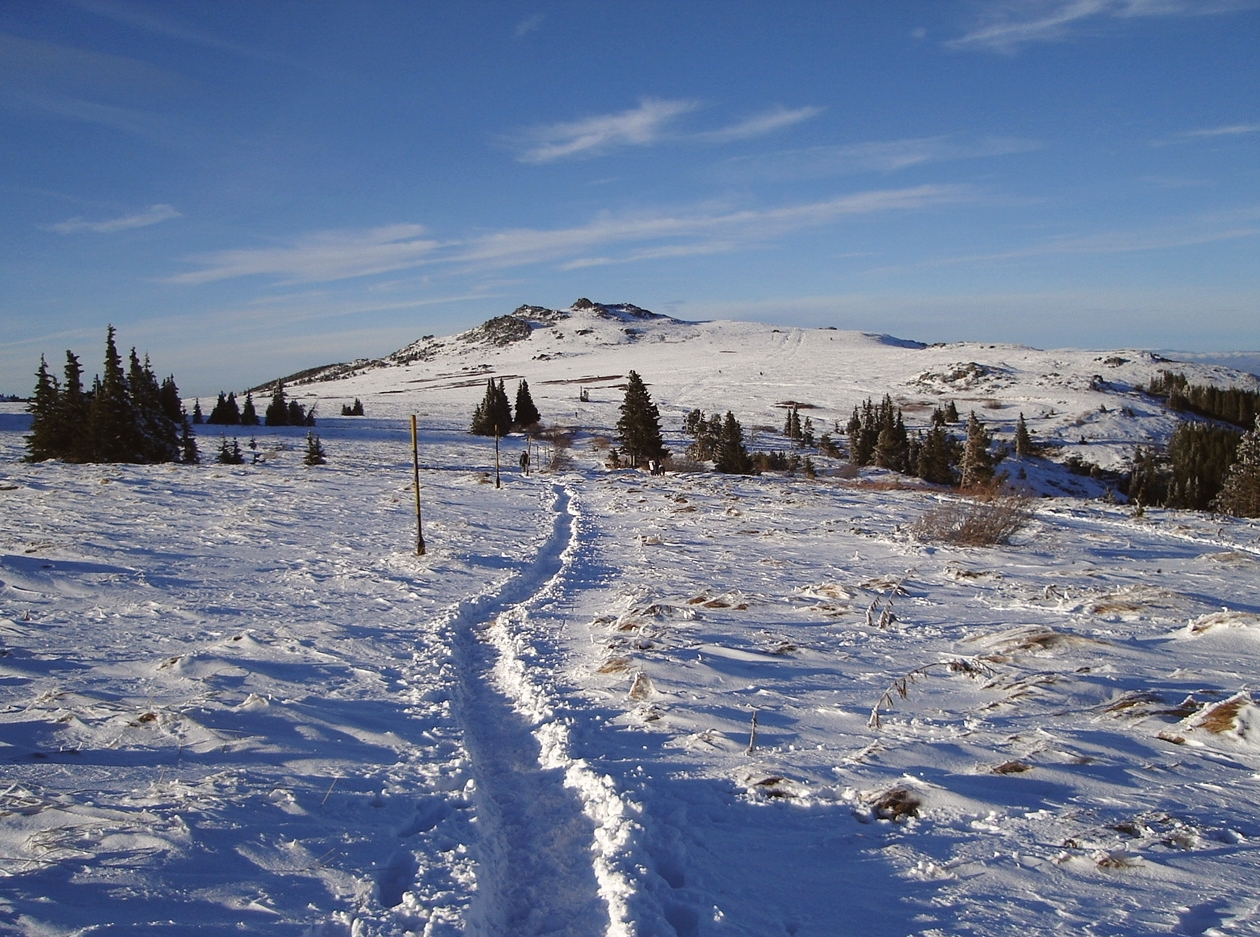
Ushite Peak from near Goli Vrah (‘Bald Peak’).

Ushite Peak (Bulgarian: Връх Ушите / ‘Ears Peak’) is a peak rising to 1,860 metres (6,100 ft) in northern Vitosha Mountain, Bulgaria. The peak is situated on the northern border of Torfeno Branishte Nature Reserve, and 650 m south of Kamen Del Peak. A small refuge is situated on the northeastern slopes Ushite, off track between Aleko and Zlatnite Mostove, the two most popular tourist sites on Vitosha.

== See also ==
- Kamen Del
- Vitosha
