= Knyazhevo, Sofia =

Knyazhevo Княжево
- quarter
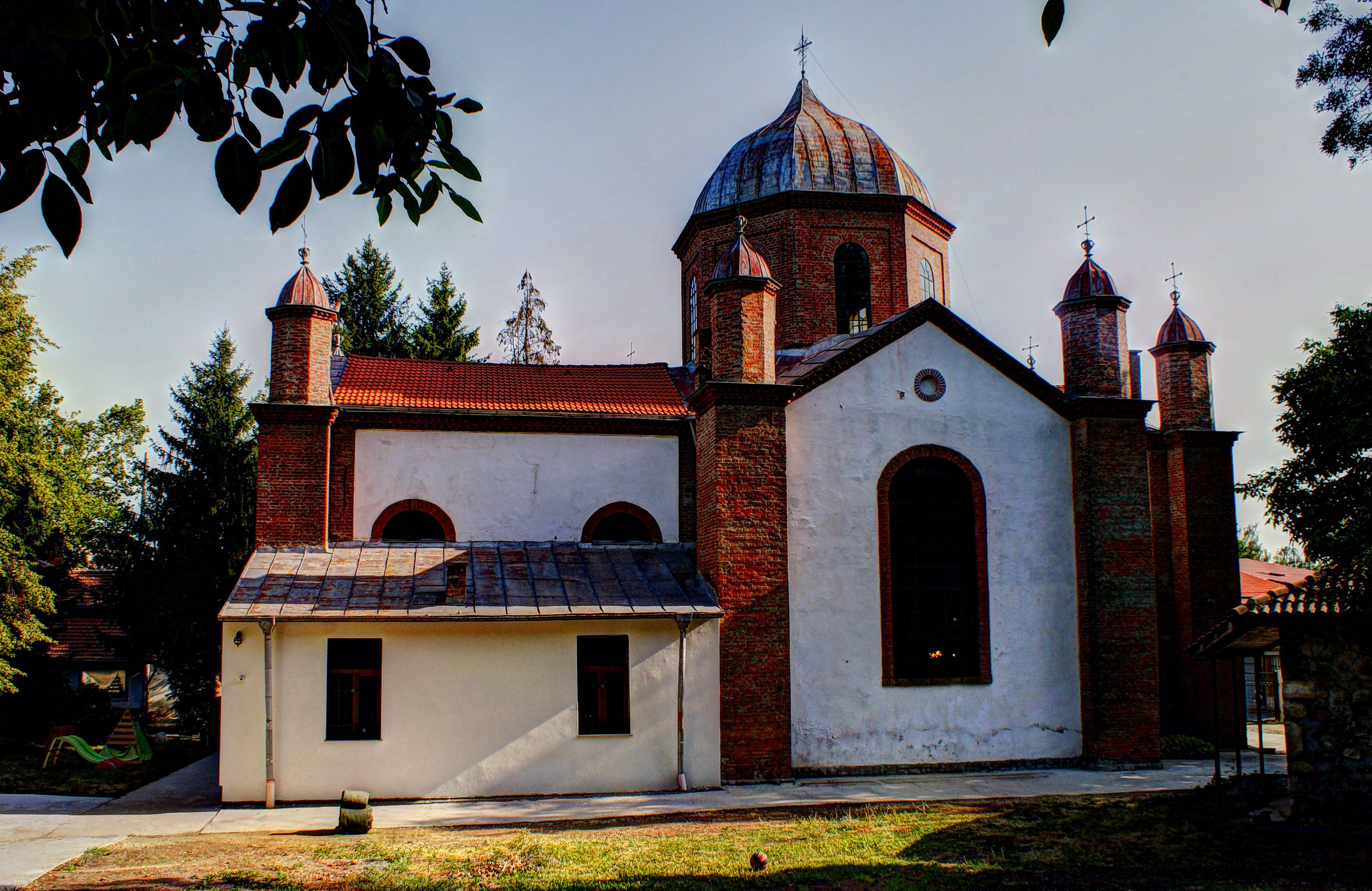
- Saint Elijah Church in Knyazhevo
- Interactive map of Knyazhevo
- Coordinates: 42°39′55″N 23°14′42″E
- Province: Sofia City Province
- City: Sofia

Knyazhevo (Bulgarian: Княжево) is a neighbourhood in Sofia, the capital city of Bulgaria. Administratively, it is part of the Vitosha District of Stolichna Municipality in the southwestern part of the Sofia City Province.

== Geography ==
Knyazhevo is situated in the southwesternmost outskirts of Sofia bordering the neighbourhoods of Gorna Banya, Kapuzitsa and Boyana to the north and northeast. About a kilometer to the southwest is the village of Vladaya.

Spread across the banks of the river Vladayska reka of the Iskar drainage, the neighbourhood sprawls along the slopes of the mountain ranges of Vitosha to the southeast and Lyulin to the northwest in the area where the Vladaya Pass between the mountains enters the Sofia Valley. There are seven mineral springs with a total discharge of 16 L/sec and temperature of 32–38 °С, whose water composition is similar to those in the nearby spa town of Bankya. There two villa zones along the mountain slopes.

== Transport ==
Located along some the main infrastructure arteries in southwestern Sofia, Knyazhevo is well connected with the national transport network. It lies along the important first class I-6 road Gyueshevo–Pernik–Sofia–Burgas about a kilometer southwest of its juncture with the Sofia Ring Road. It is traversed by railway line No. 5 Sofia–Blagoevgrad–Kulata, but there is no railway station, the closest ones being in Gorna Banya and Vladaya. Knyazhevo is served by several bus and tram lines of the Sofia Public Transport.

== History ==
Knyazhevo was originally a village, initially known as Klisura, meaning “gorge” in Bulgarian, and was first mentioned in a 16th-century book dedicated to the memory of the medieval Bulgarian monarchs. In 1881, several years after the Liberation of Bulgaria from Ottoman rule, the village was renamed to Knyazhevo, in honour of Knyaz (Prince) Alexander of Battenberg, the first ruler of the re-established Bulgarian state.

In 1881, Frenchman Hippolyte Berger constructed in Knyazhevo the first alcohol factory in the country. In 1882, Lazar Trifkovich and later in 1883, brothers Bogdan and Georgi Proshek built the first breweries. In 1891, Czech engineer Josef Horvet inaugurated the first paper mill in Bulgaria with an annual production of 1 341 tons of paper. In 1901, the tram line Sofia–Knyazhevo was put into operation. It became the first fully electrified settlement in the country in 1917.

In 1938, Knyazhevo, along with other villages, became part of the Sofia Municipality. At the time, the population had reached 5,000. The budget for 1938 of the until then separate municipality of Knyazhevo amounted to 4 million leva, with 1/4 of the revenue coming from industrial enterprises. In 1958 it became of neighbourhood of Sofia.

Due to the mineral springs and the proximity to the mountains, since the 19th century Knyazhevo has been a popular recreation area with numerous villas and second homes. It was among the starting points of the first organized climb of Cherni Vrah (2290 m), the highest summit of Vitosha, led by writer Aleko Konstantinov in 1895. Many Bulgarian artists, writers, musicians, scientists and sportsmen had resided there, including Emil Dimitrov, Pasha Hristova, Georgi Markov, Boyan Petrov, etc.
