= Vladaya (river) =

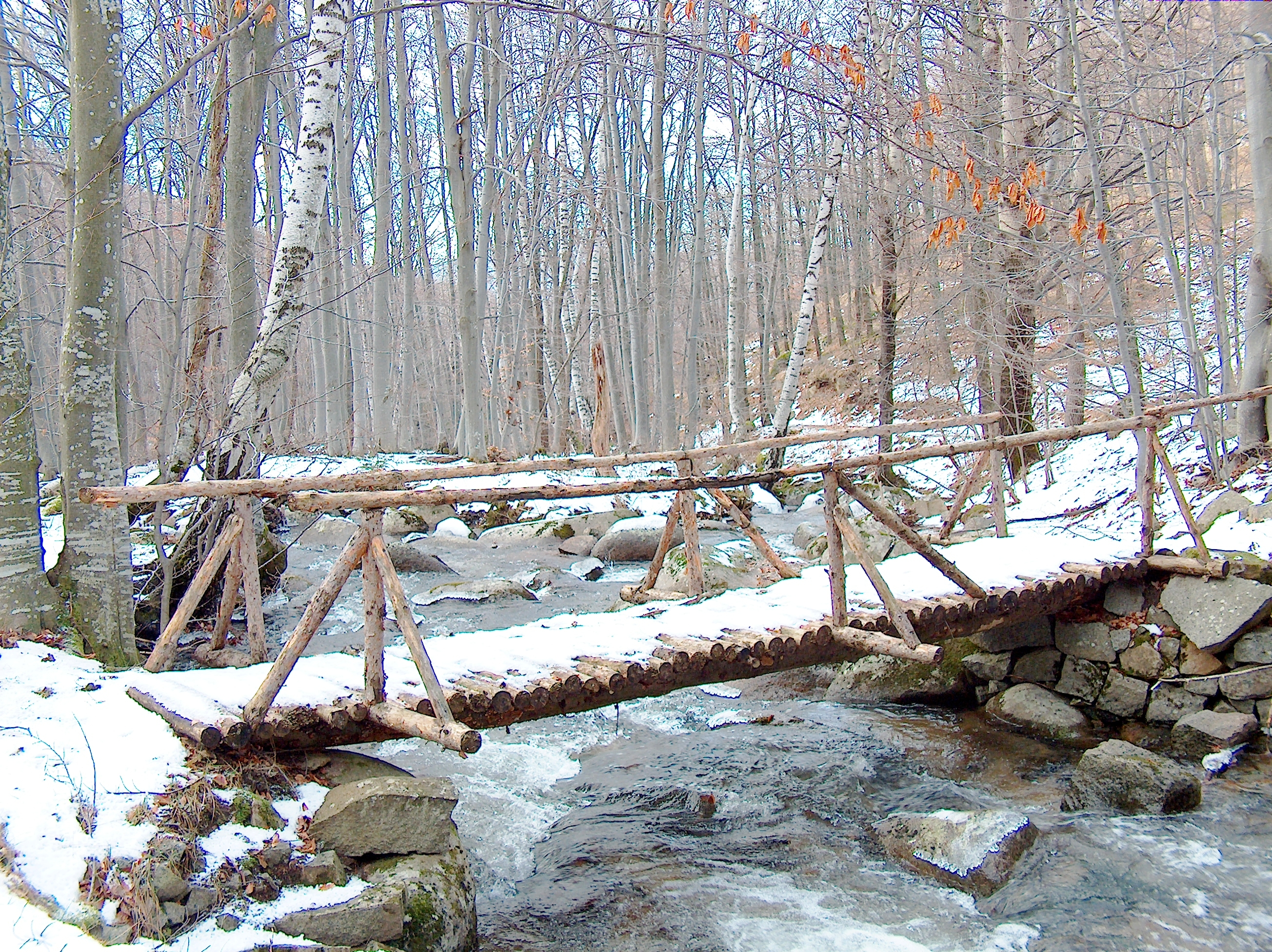
- The Vladayska on Vitosha Mountain
- Native name: Владайска река (Bulgarian)

Location
- Country: Bulgaria

Physical characteristics
- Source
  - location: NW of Cherni Vrah, Vitosha
  - coordinates: 42.5642°N 23.2831°E
  - elevation: 2,245 m (7,365 ft)
- Mouth
  - location: Perlovska
  - coordinates: 42.7532°N 23.3734°E
  - elevation: 550 m (1,800 ft)
- Length: 37 km (23 mi)
- Basin size: 151 km^{2} (58 sq mi)

Basin features
- Progression: Perlovska→ Iskar→ Danube→ Black Sea

The Vladayska reka (Bulgarian: Владайска река) is a 37 km-long river in western Bulgaria, a left tributary of the Perlovska, itself a left tributary of the Iskar of the Danube drainage.

== Geography ==
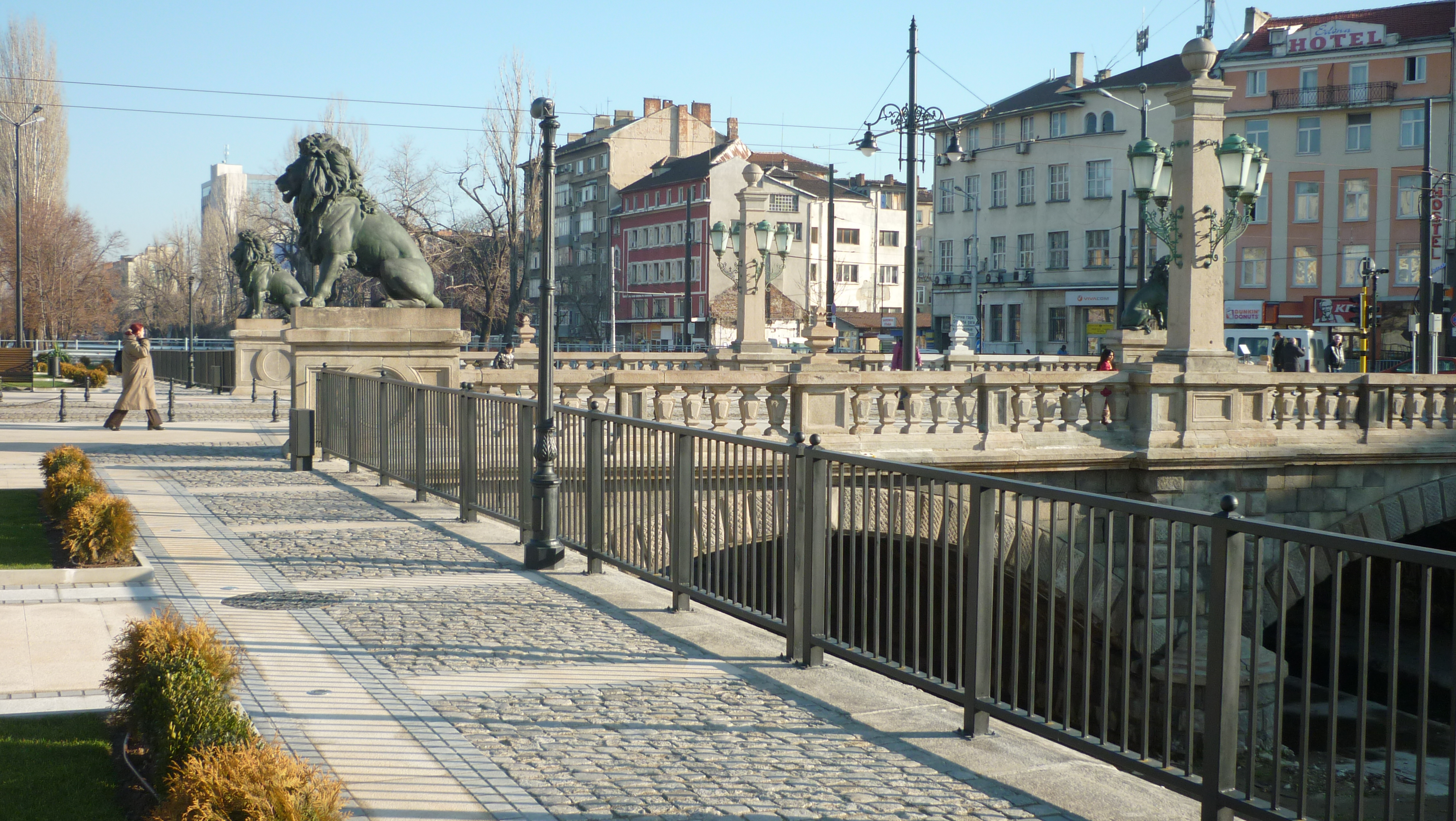
The Lions' Bridge over the river

The river takes its source at an altitude of 2,245 m from the northwestern slopes of Cherni Vrah (2,290 m), the highest summit of the Vitosha mountain range. It flows northwest through the Torfeno Branishte nature reserve, then submerges beneath the stone run of Zlatnite Mostove, and descends to the village of Vladaya in a deep, steep and forested valley. In the village the river bends in direction northeast, runs through the Vladaya Saddle that separates Vitosha from the Lyulin mountain range, and then enters the Sofia Valley and the outskirts of the city of Sofia.

There, it runs through the neighbourhoods of Knyazhevo, Karpuzitsa and Ovcha Kupel, reaching the Serdika industrial zone. From there it enters the downtown through the boulevards of Engineer Ivan Ivanov and Slivnitsa. After Stochna Gara Square it flows through the Hadzhi Dimitar industrial zone, the Orlandovtsi neighbourhood, then north of Maleshevtsi and east of Benkovski, both neighbourhoods of Sofia. In the vicinity of the Obradinovski Monastery the river flows into the Perlovska reka at an altitude of 515 m, just 500 m of the Perlovska reka's confluence with the Iskar.

Its drainage basin covers a territory of 151 km^{2} or 58.8% of the Perlovska's total.

The Vladayska reka has rain–snow feed with high water in April–June and low water in August–October. The average annual discharge at Knyazhevo is 0.65 m^{3}/s.

In the upper course of the river in Vitosha there are numerous tourist tracks. In Sofia its whole course is corrected. There are numerous bridges over the Vladayska reka, the most important historically being the Lions' Bridge. Other bridges include the Aleskandrov and the Heroes' Bridge.

== Gallery ==
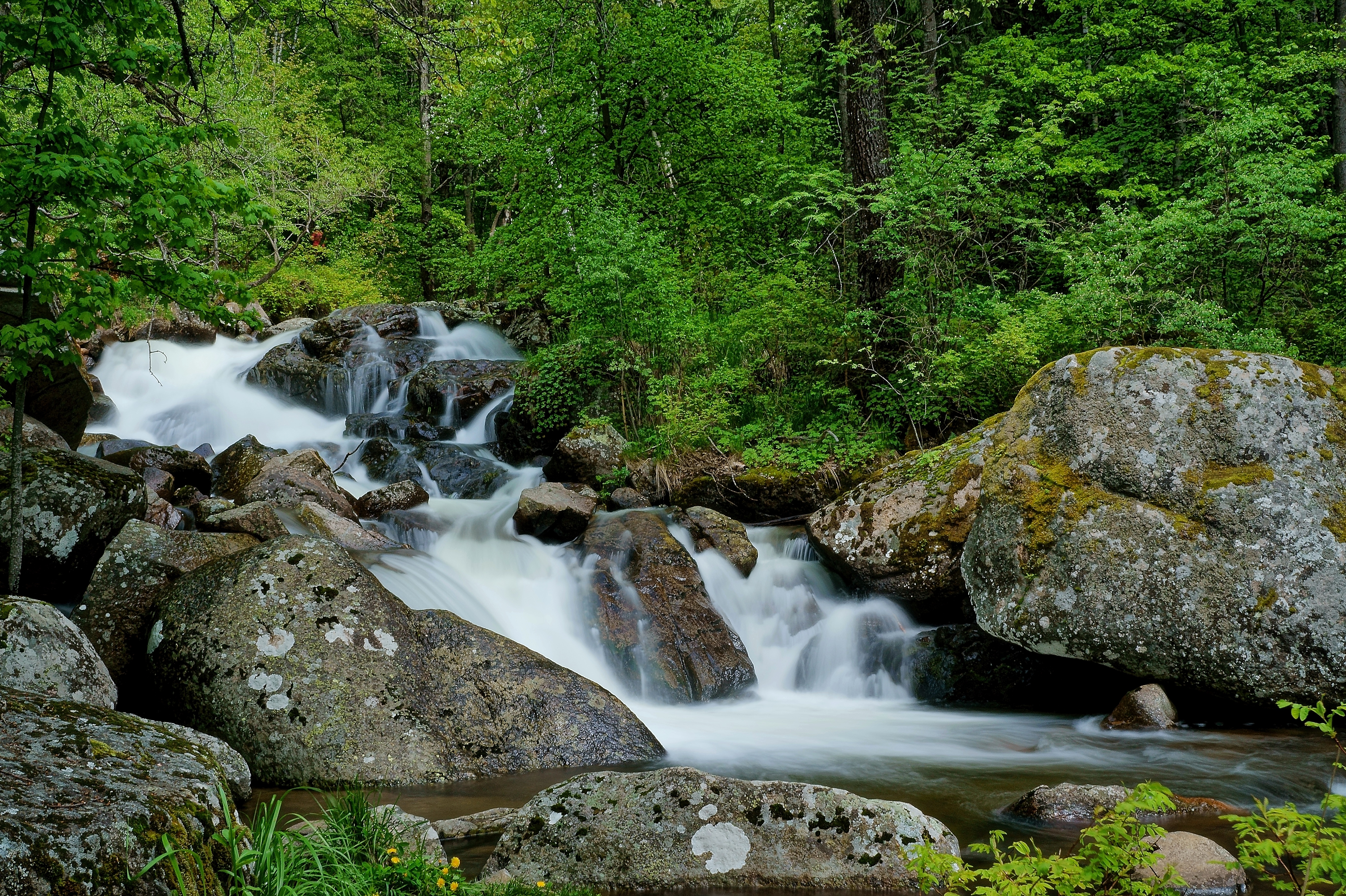
Upper course in Vitosha

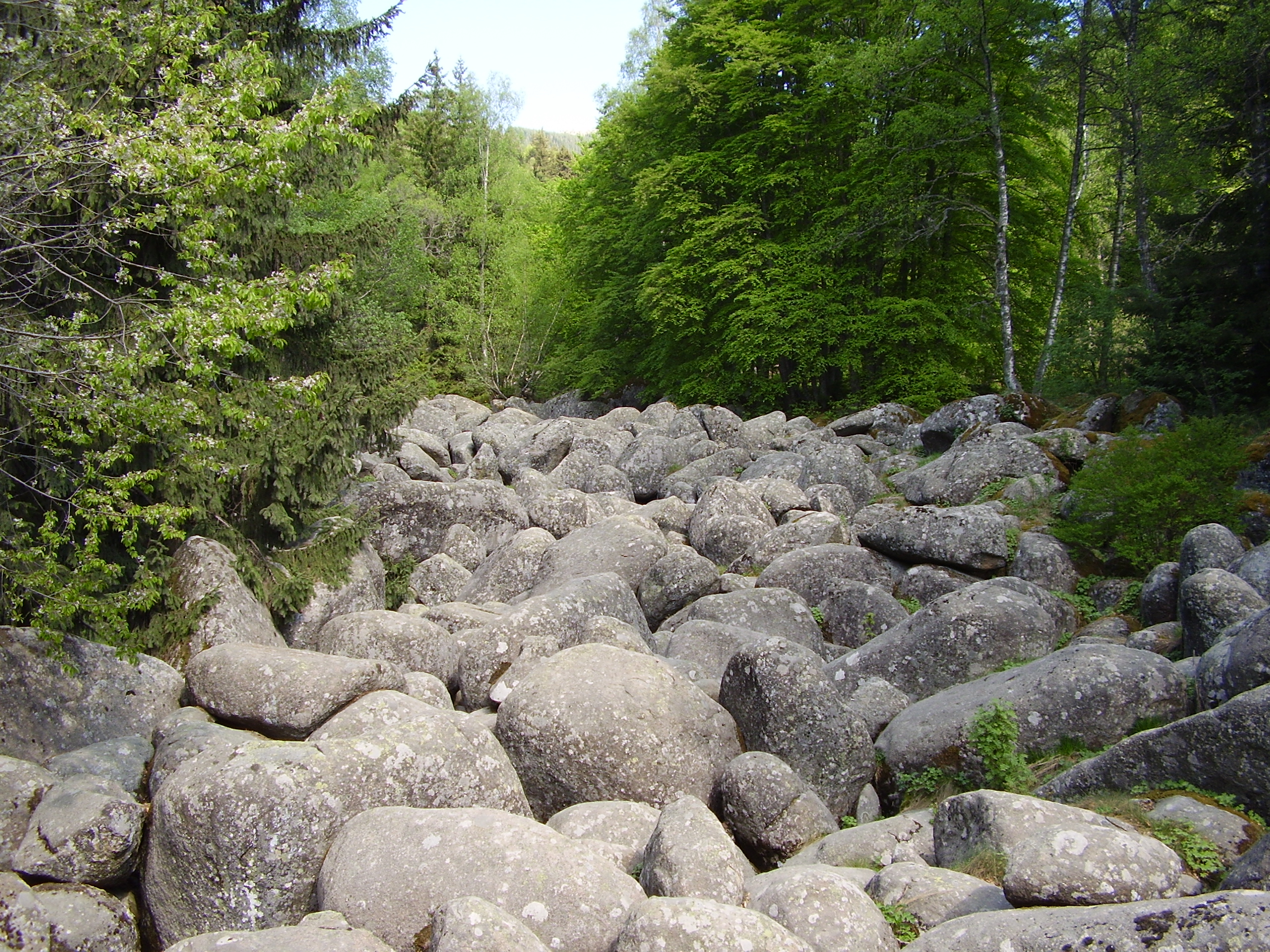
The river passes under Zlatnite Mostove

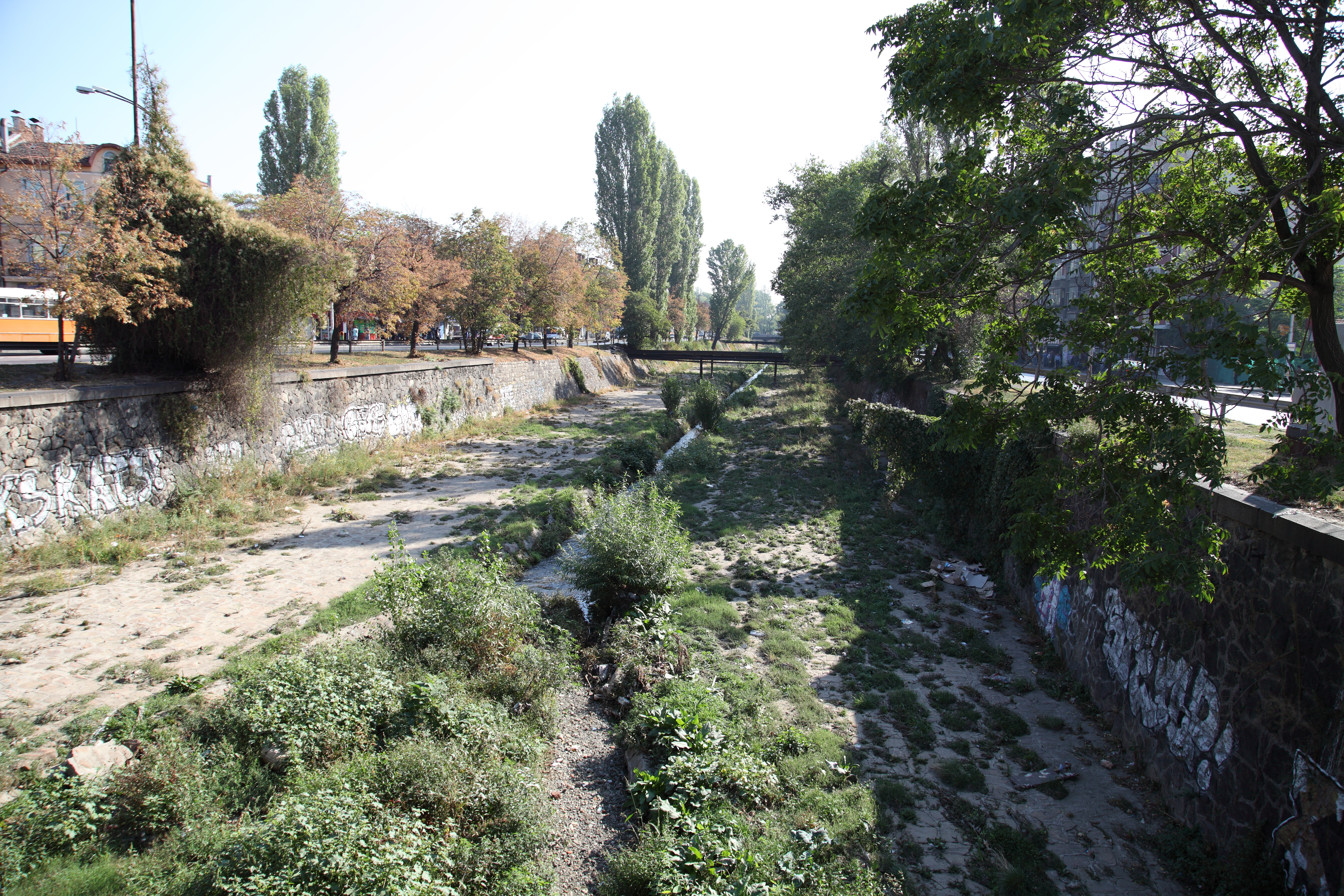
Corrected course in Sofia

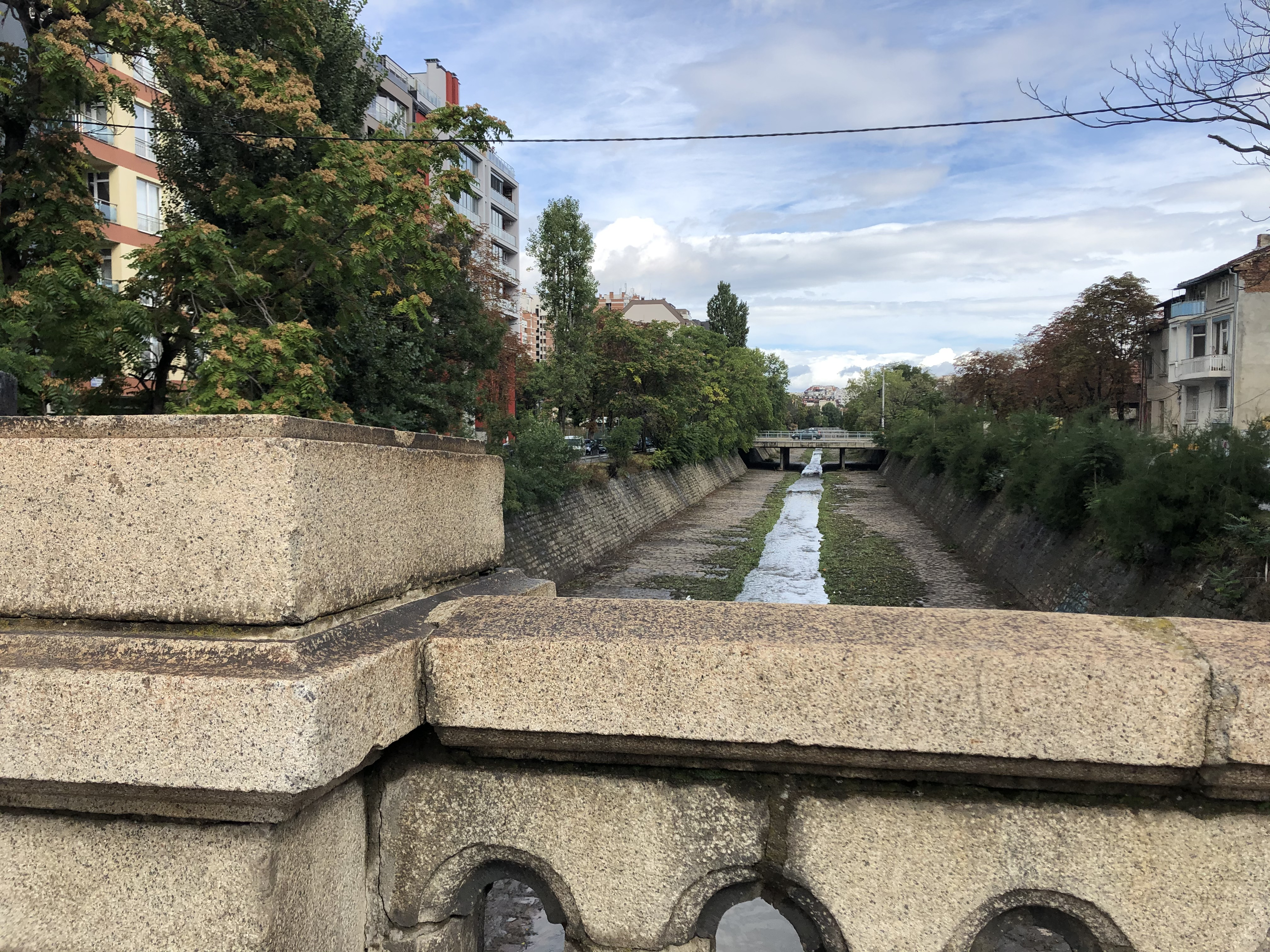
View from the Heroes' Bridge
