= Torfeno Branishte =

Nature reserve in Bulgaria

Coordinates: 42°34′52″N 23°16′12″E

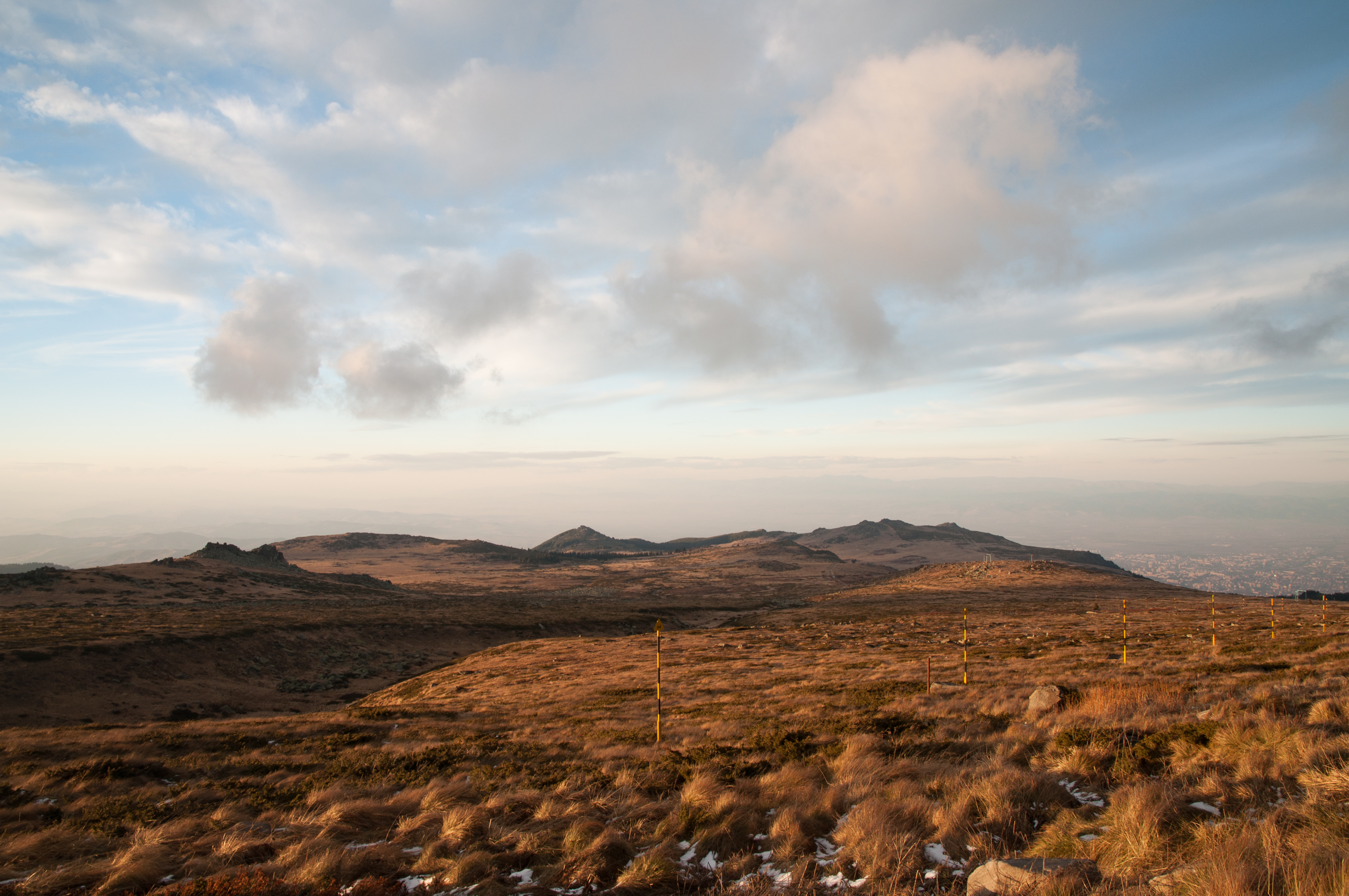
Torfeno Branishte (Turf Reserve), a natural reserve on Vitosha Mountain.

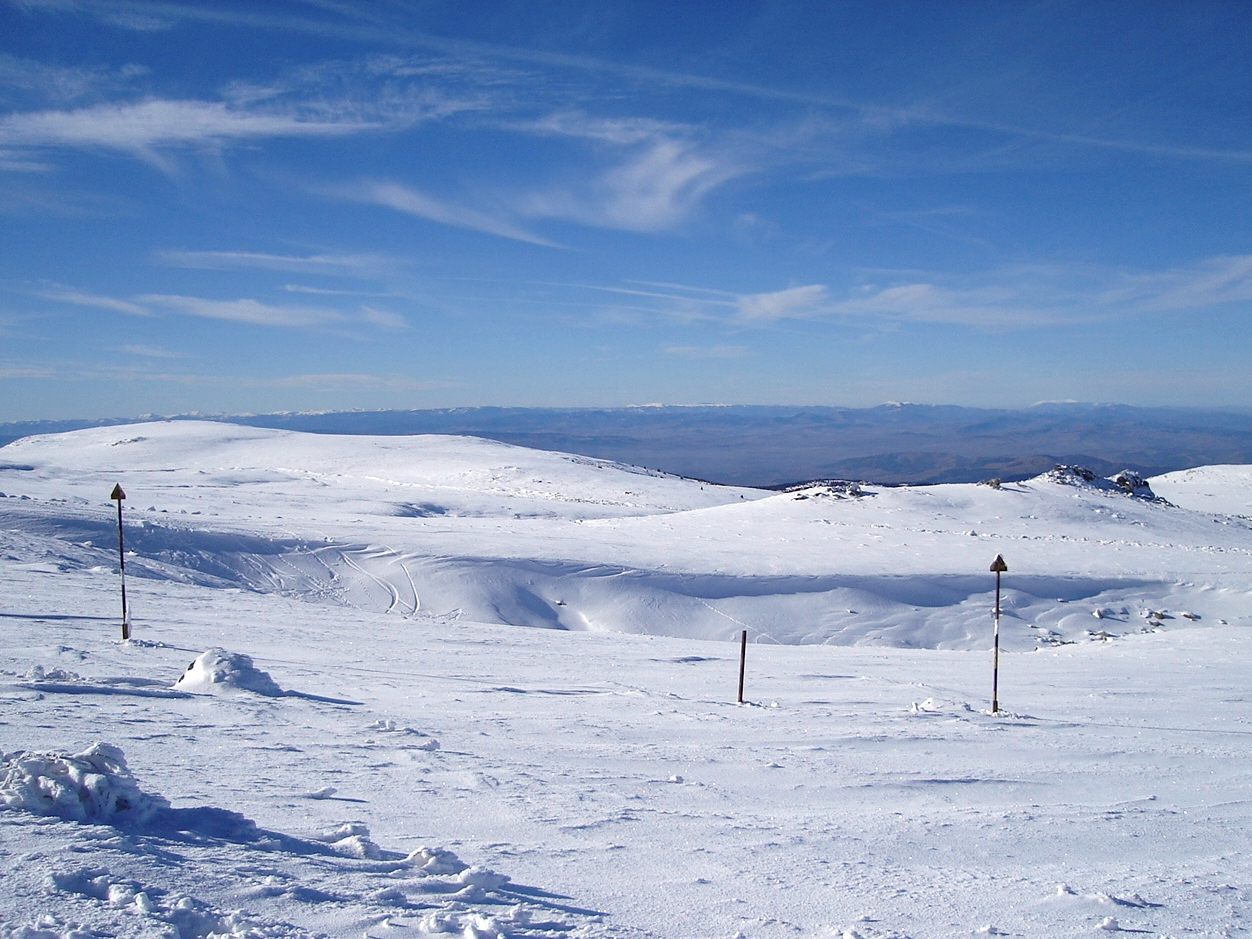
The upper part of Torfeno Branishte north of Cherni Vrah, with Lavcheto Peak (‘Small Lion’, 2052 m) on the right.

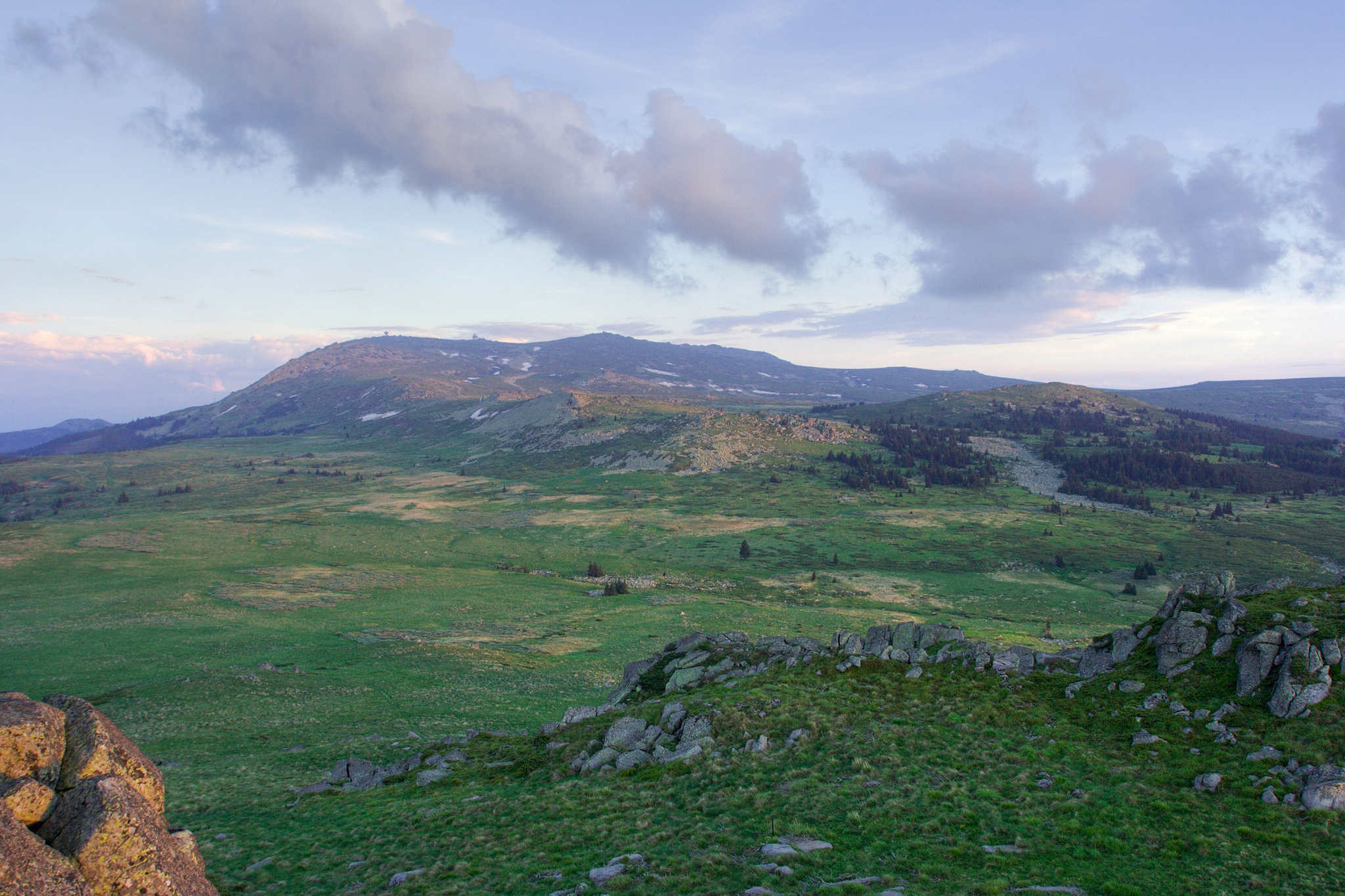
The lower northern part of Torfeno Branishte from Vrah Ushite (‘Ears Peak’); Cherni Vrah in the background.

Torfeno Branishte (Bulgarian: Торфено бранище / ‘Turf Reserve’) is a nature reserve on Vitosha Mountain in Bulgaria, along with the Bistrishko Branishte reserve. The reserve has a surface area of 728.8 ha comprising the parts of Big Plateau and the Kapaklivets Plateau between the peaks of Cherni Vrah (2290 m), Ushite (1906 m), and Chernata Skala (1869 m), including the upper watersheds of the Vladayska, Boyanska and Dragalevska Rivers.

Torfeno Branishte was created in 1935 to preserve the pristine turf communities in the Subalpine zone of Vitosha, with hundreds of moss and algae species. The turf surface is 0.6 to 2 m thick, increasing by 1 mm annually.

Access to the reserve is strictly forbidden because along with its conservation status Torfeno Branishte is also a drinking water catchment area.

== Ecology ==
The constantly wet, acidic environment has contributed for the developing a unique ecosystem. The deeper parts of the reserve are covered in communities of Sphagnum Capillifolium, Sphagnum Warnstorfii, and other types of sphagnum. The territory is virtually treeless, with some shrub communities such as sallow, juniper and blueberry, and the occasional mountain pine. The ground flora consists mainly of plants from the family Cyperaceae. Gentiana, the red Aven, Geum coccineum, and Saxifraga rotundifolia are also relatively common plants. It is also one of the few places in Bulgaria where one can see the rare native carnivorous plants - Pinguicula balcanica, Drosera rotundifolia, and two species of Utricularia, found in small ponds - Utricularia minor and Utricularia australis. On very rare occasions, visitors can see the bright yellow flowers of Trollius europaeus there. The fauna is rich, too. Deer, wolves, wild pigs, and, rarely, bears have been known to cross the reserve. On the higher parts, the very rare Spalax Leucodon can also be found.

== See also ==
- Vitosha
- Bistrishko Branishte
- Nature Reserve
- Selimitsa
