= Lions' Bridge, Sofia =

Lions' Bridge Лъвов мост
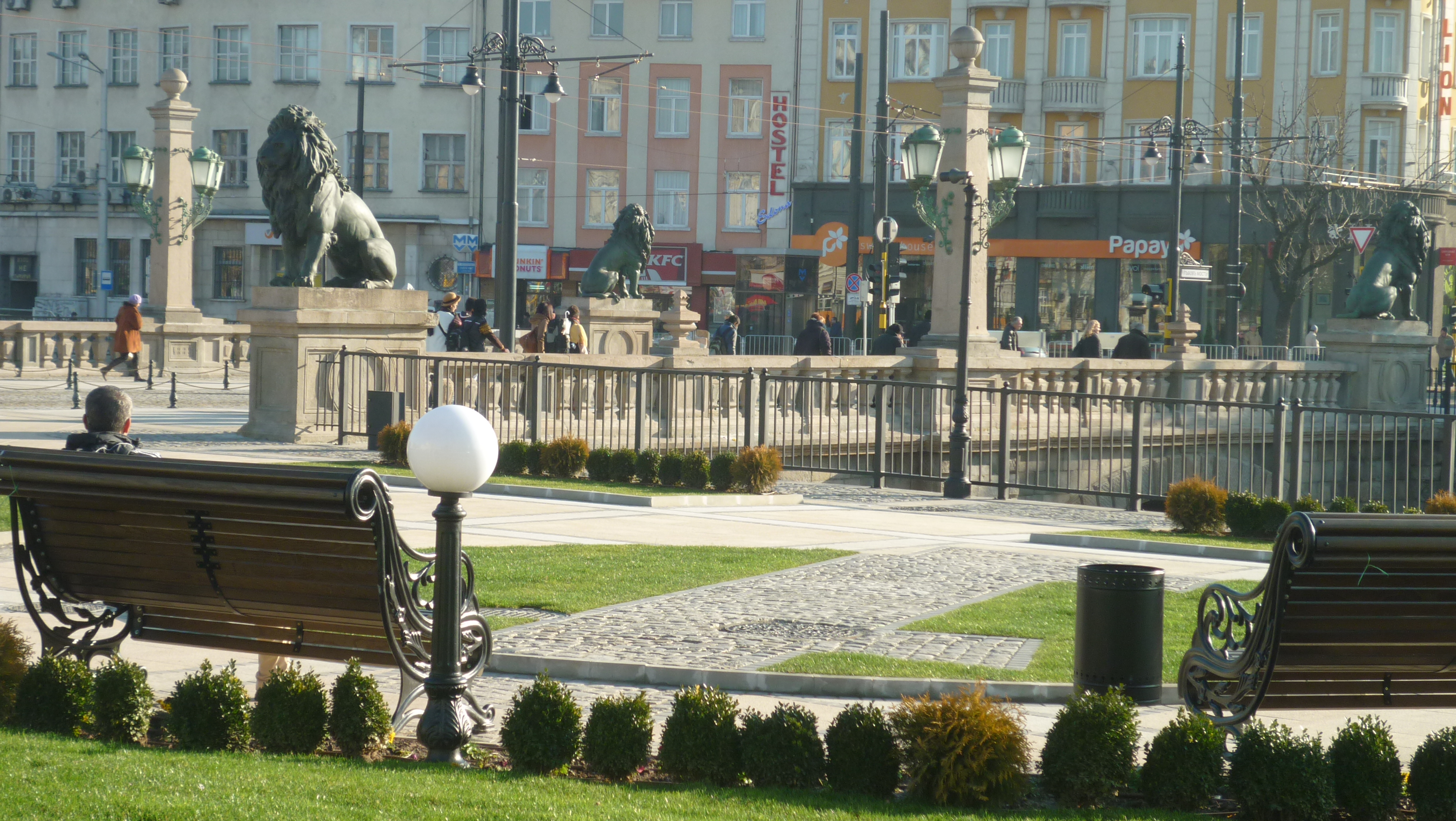
- Coordinates: 42°42′17.65″N 23°19′25.85″E
- Carries: Pedestrian and trams
- Crosses: Vladayska River
- Locale: Sofia, Bulgaria
- Official name: Лъвов мост

Characteristics
- Design: Stone arch bridge
- Total length: 32 metres (105 ft)
- Width: 18 metres (59 ft)

History
- Designer: Václav Prošek and Jozef Prošek
- Construction start: 1889
- Construction end: 1891
- Opened: 1891

Location
- Interactive map of Lions' Bridge

Lions' Bridge (Bulgarian: Лъвов мост; Lavov most) is a bridge over the Vladaya River in the centre of Sofia, the capital of Bulgaria, built 1889–1891 by Czech architect Václav Prošek, his brother Jozef and his cousins Bohdan and Jiří. It gives the name to the important and busy junction of Marie Louise Boulevard and Slivnitsa Boulevard, at which it is located, connecting the Central Railway Station with the city centre and marking its northern border.

The neighborhood can be described as socially challenging. For tourists its recommended to be careful here. Generally, Sofia is safe but this part has some social challenges. Poverty, no investment in infrastructure, drug addicts, homeless and prostitution. The road is damaged and half of the houses ruins, covered with net so stones don´t fall on the street. But the other half of the houses were renovated lately. There are also plans to build the street new in the next 2 years. It is close to the women's market, the central rail station and the migration office what contributes to these problems.

== Overview ==
The bridge was built from stone at the place of an older bridge called Sharen Most (Шарен мост, "Motley Bridge") because it was decorated with red and yellow stripes. The name of Lions' Bridge comes from the four bronze sculptures of lions, its most recognizable feature. All metal elements of the bridge were produced by the Austrian company of Rudolph Philipp Waagner, and electric lights were installed in the early 1900s. The entire construction of the bridge cost 260,000 golden lev.

The Prošek family also designed and built the similar but eagle-themed Eagles' Bridge marking the city centre's eastern border in 1891.

One of the bronze lions is depicted on the reverse of the Bulgarian 20 lev banknote, issued in 1999 and 2007.

Since 2012 the area around Lions' Bridge is served by the Lavov most station of the Sofia Metro M2 line.

In 2014, a major reconstruction of the square was completed, converting the intersection into a two-level interchange. The automobile traffic was removed from the bridge, reserving it only for trams and pedestrians.

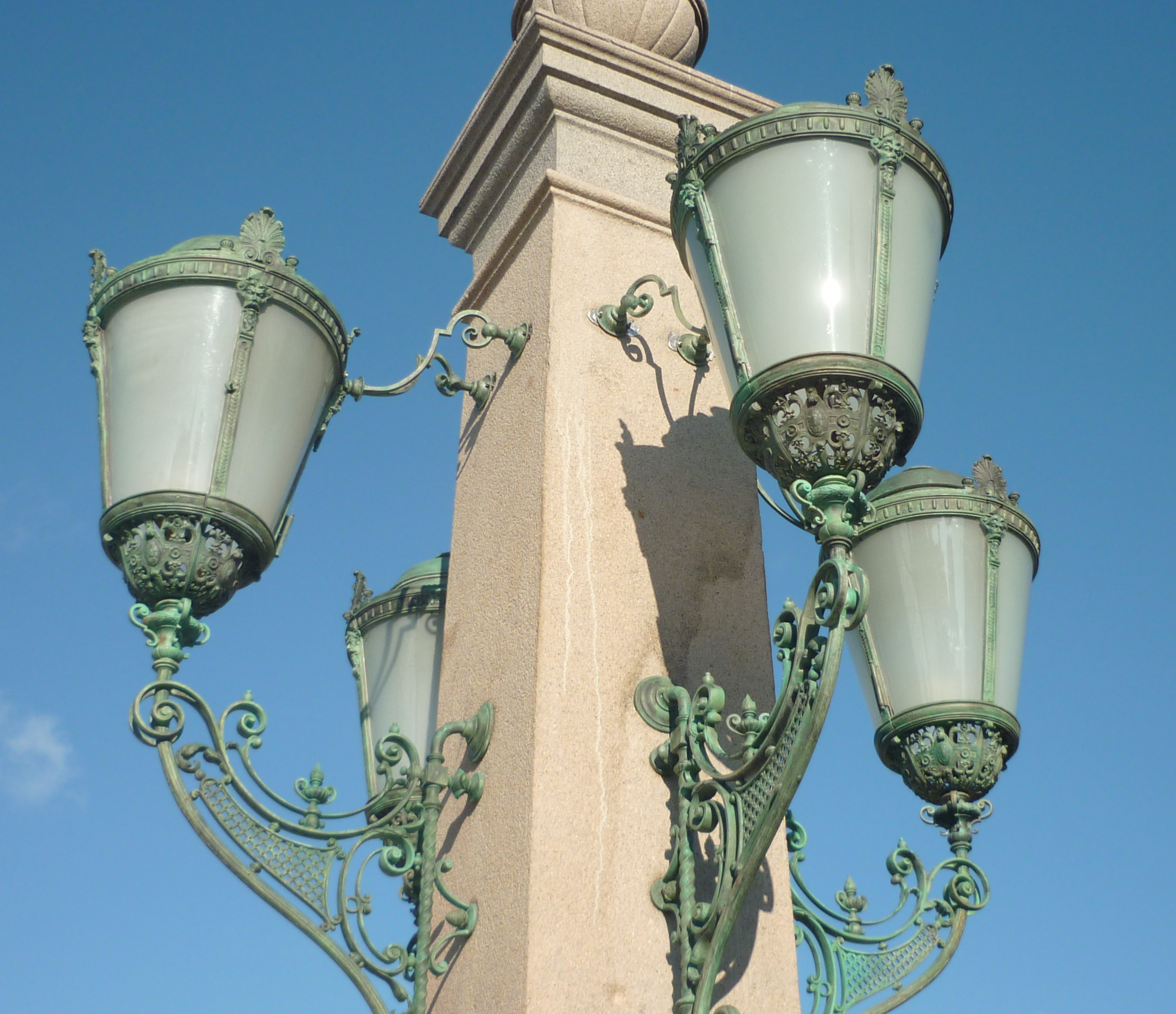

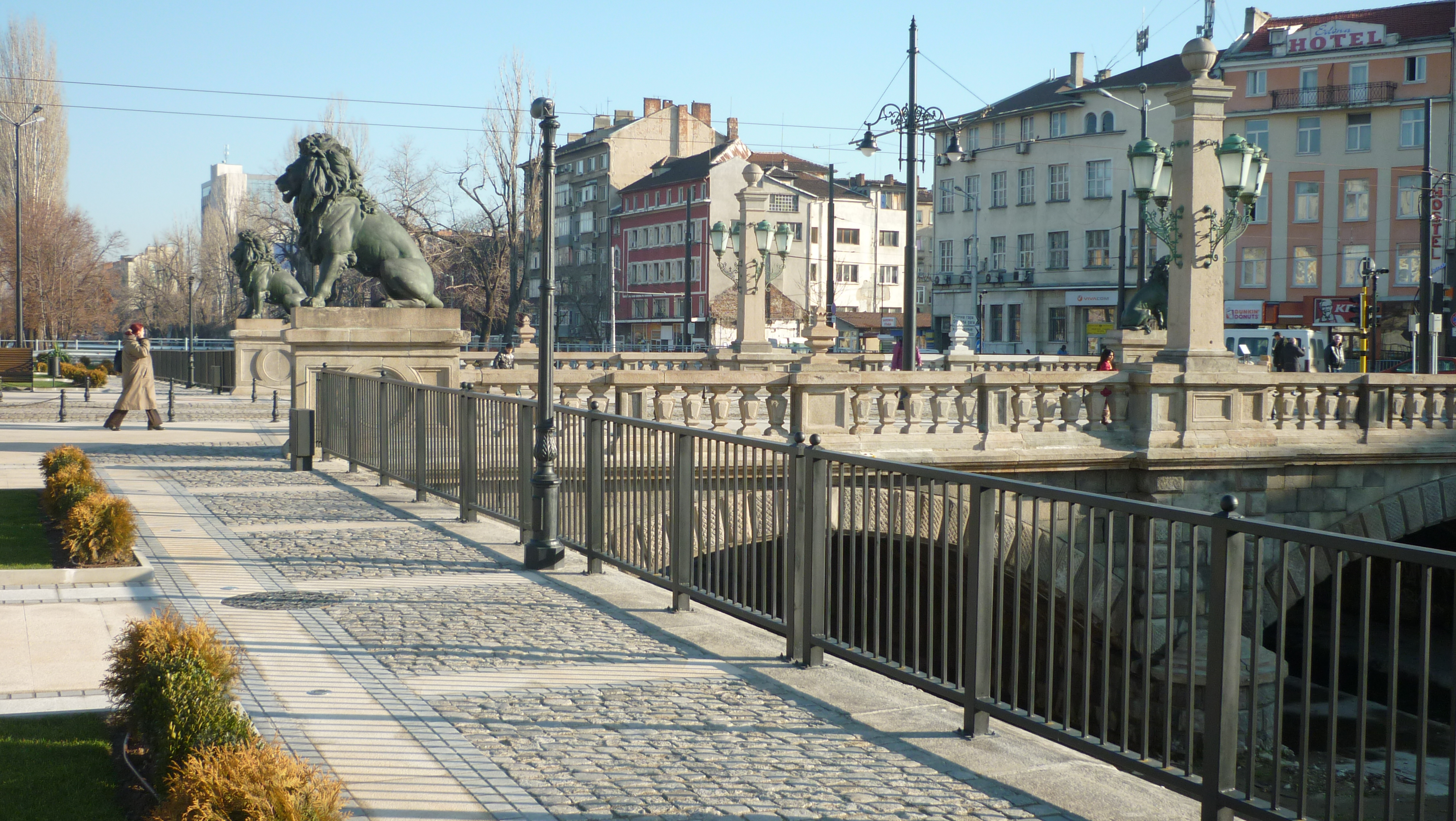
Lions' Bridge

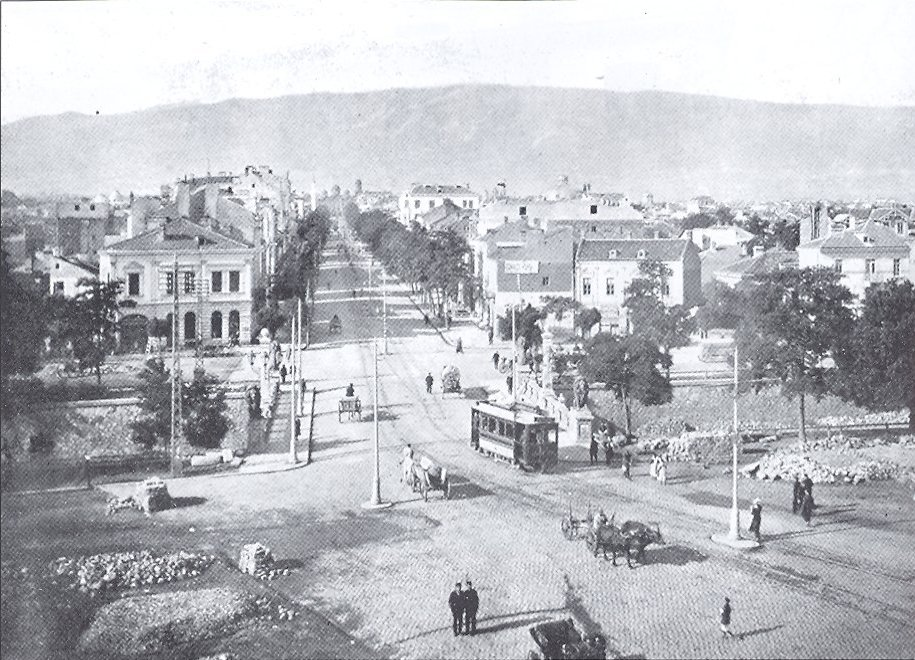
Lion's Bridge and the surrounding area in 1910

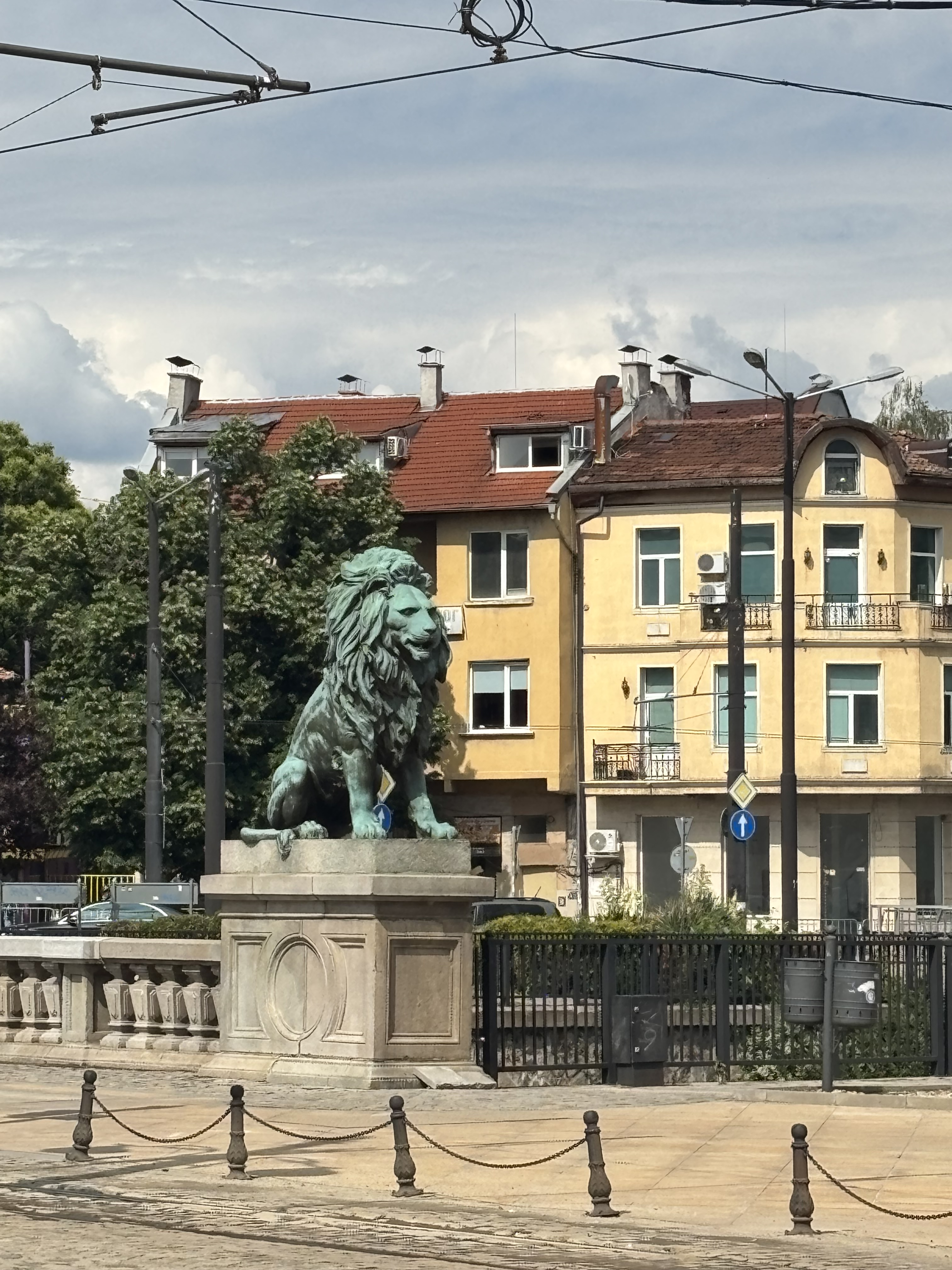
A Lion in 2026
