= Zlatnite Mostove =

Stone river in Bulgaria

Zlatnite Mostove Златните мостове (Bulgarian) Golden Bridges
- Stone run
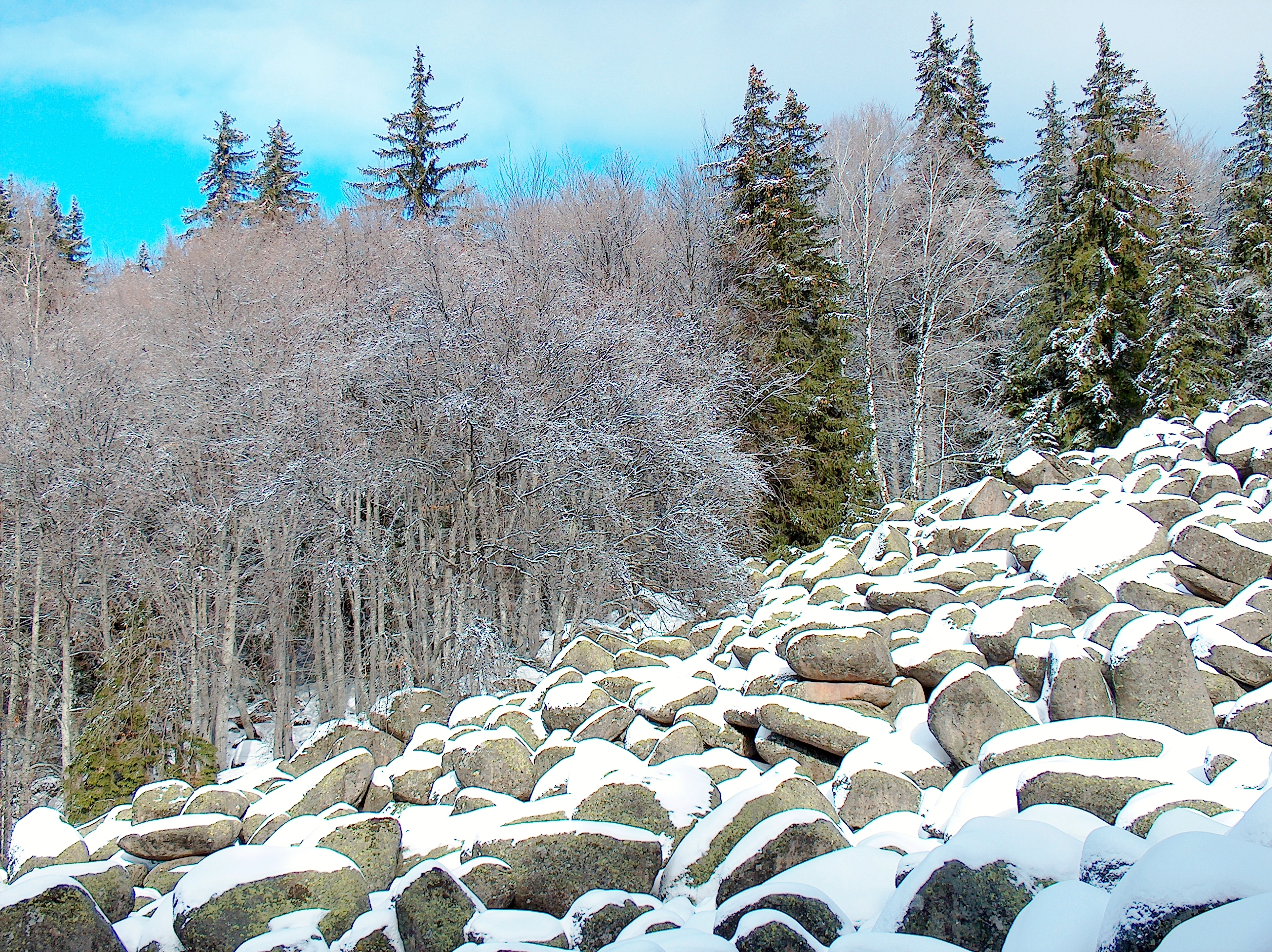
- The run in the winter

- Location within Bulgaria
- Coordinates: 42°36′33″N 23°14′26″E
- Location: Sofia City Province, Sofia Province, Pernik Province
- Part of: Vitosha

Dimensions
  - Length: 2.2 km (1.4 mi)
  - Width: 150 m (490 ft)
- Elevation: 1,410 m (4,630 ft)
- Highest elevation: 1,800 m (5,900 ft)

Zlatnite Mostove (Bulgarian: Златните мостове, ‘Golden Bridges’) is the largest stone river on Vitosha Mountain, Bulgaria. The feature is situated in the valley of Vladayska River, extending 2.2 km, and up to 150 m wide, with several ‘tributary’ stone rivers. The stone river is ‘descending’ from elevation 1800 m above sea level in Boeritsa Chalet area to 1410 m at Zlatnite Mostove site. The lower extremity of the stone river is known as Zlatnite Mostove site, a popular tourist destination accessible from Sofia by road.

The name ‘Golden Bridges’ derives from the golden colour of the lichens growing on the surface of stone run boulders.
