= Vitosha =

Mountain massif in Bulgaria

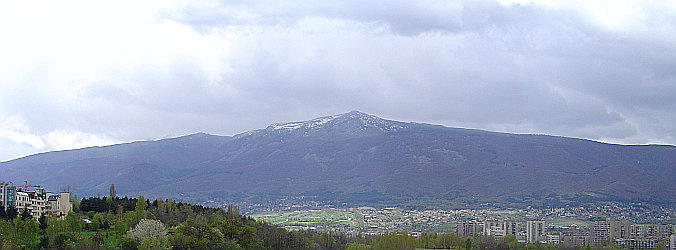

Highest point
- Elevation: 2,292 m (7,520 ft)
- Prominence: 1,275 m (4,183 ft)
- Coordinates: 42°34′N 23°17′E

Naming
- Native name: Витоша (Bulgarian)

Geography
- Location within Bulgaria
- Location: Sofia City Province, Sofia Province, Pernik Province
- Topo map: Vitosha Map

Climbing
- First ascent: Unknown
- Easiest route: Cable car to Aleko (1810 m), chair lift to Malak Rezen (2191 m), easy footpath to Cherni Vrah
- IUCN category V (protected landscape/seascape)
- Area: 270.79 km^{2} (104.55 sq mi)
- Established: 1934
- Governing body: Ministry of Environment and Water

Map of Vitosha

Vitosha (Bulgarian: Витоша [ˈvitoʃɐ]), the ancient Scomius or Scombrus, is a mountain massif, on the outskirts of Sofia, the capital of Bulgaria. Vitosha is one of the symbols of Sofia and the closest site for hiking, alpinism and skiing. Convenient bus lines and rope ways render the mountain easily accessible. Vitosha has the outlines of an enormous dome.

The territory of the mountain includes Vitosha nature park that encompasses the best known and most frequently visited parts. The foothills of Vitosha shelter resort quarters of Sofia; Knyazhevo quarter has mineral springs. Vitosha is the oldest nature park in the Balkans.

The mountain emerged as a result of volcanic activity and has been subsequently shaped by the slow folding of the granite rock layers and a series of gradual uplifts of the area. It appears dome shaped at first sight, but the mountain, 19 km long by 17 km wide, actually consists of concentric denudational plateaus rising in tiers one above the other. Vitosha is separated into four main parts whose main ridges gather at a crown known as Cherni Vrah ('Black Peak', Bulgarian: черни връх). This is the highest point of the mountain at 2290 m and is one of 12 peaks of Vitosha over 2000 m in height. It is the highest massif of the Srednogorie mountain chain system, together with Sredna gora, Plana (mountain), Lyulin Mountain, Greben (mountain), Viskyar Mountain, etc. They all are a result of the folding of the earth layers through the Mesozoic, causing also magma sheet-like intrusion (or concordant pluton) that has been injected between layers of sedimentary rock. The laccolithic domed form of Vitosha is a typical example.

Bulgaria's longest cave, Duhlata, with a total length of 18,200 m, is situated in Vitosha in the karstic region near the village of Bosnek.

Since the ancient times of the Thracians a large population has always existed at the base of Vitosha. For the last four thousand years the economy of this large settlement has always been connected, in one way or another, with the neighboring mountain. The name Vitosha comes from the two-peaked, twin ridge mountain, which rises above the Sofia field and has acquired its present shape in stages over many millennia.

A meteorological station was built at the top in 1935, and is still operating. The station also serves as a rest shelter for hikers and is the headquarters for the mountain rescue team. Historical documents show that several centuries ago Vitosha mountain was still covered by the remains of the inaccessible "Great Bulgarian Forest" (Magna Silva Bulgarica). Today, the natural coniferous forests of Vitosha remain only in the reserve Bistrishko Branishte and around Zlatnite Mostove (The Golden Bridges). The Golden Bridges is a stone river consisting of a ribbon of huge boulders running down the mountainside. This scenic spot is located along the Vladayska River in an area of mixed deciduous and evergreen forest. However, this is only one of the stone rivers found in Vitosha and they were once the moraines of ancient glaciers. Their further formation occurred due to the spherical erosion of the sienite rocks and their gradual movement to down stream valleys by the forces of gravity and moving water.

At a time when nature conservation ideas were a long way from the present understanding, some enlightened noblemen took the first step in 1934 by declaring 66 km² of Vitosha a nature park, hence Vitosha became the first park of this kind in the Balkans. During the following year, some of the early Bulgarian reserves, Bistrishko Branishte (subsequently expanded to 10.61 km²) and Torfeno Branishte (7.84 km² respectively), were designated within its boundaries. The park boundaries fluctuated over many years and today it encompasses the entire mountain; an area of 266.06 km².

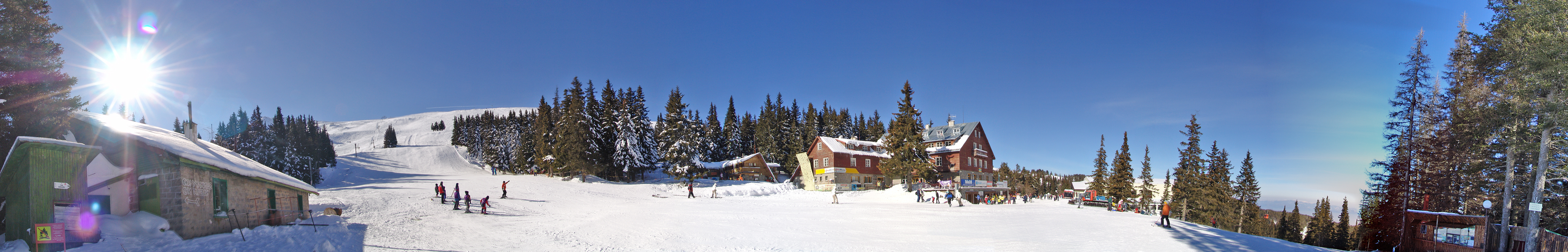
The Aleko area with the Aleko lodge in the middle

== Ecology ==
Due to a great variability in elevation, a rich diversity of climates, flora and fauna can be found within the park. Research has revealed that on the comparatively small area of the mountain there are 1,500 species of higher plants, 500 species of fungi, 500 species of algae, 326 species of mosses, and 200 species of lichens.

The forests are mainly composed of Norway spruce and Bulgarian fir, with some Macedonian pine, Scots pine, and at the tree-line, mountain pine, and mixed deciduous forest at lower altitudes, mainly beech, birch, aspen and alder. Regarding herbaceous plants, well-established populations of Veratrum album are present on the mountain, as well as other species commonly called 'lilies'. There are also orchids, such as the East European green-winged orchid (Orchis morio) that grows in the higher parts. Lungwort (Pulmonaria officinalis) is another widespread herbaceous plant on Vitosha; it develops in dank sites under the shade of the forest.

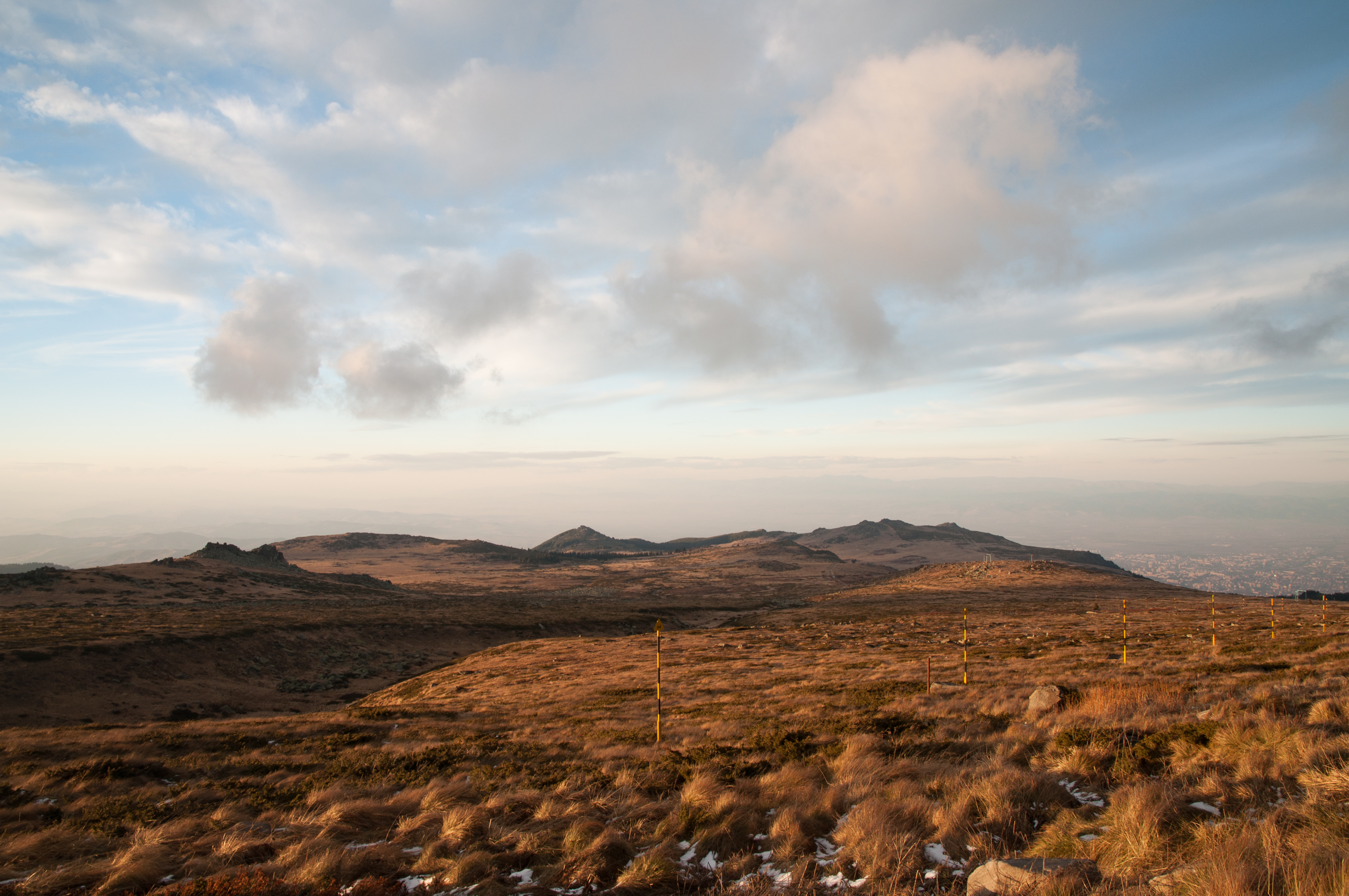
Torfeno Branishte (Peat Reserve) on the Vitosha Plateau. The city of Sofia can be seen in the background (right).

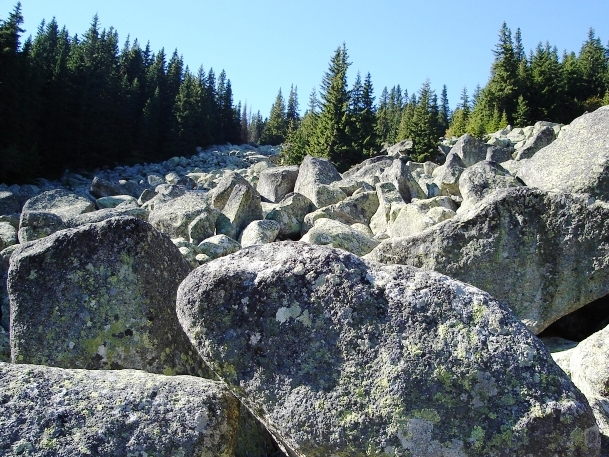
Zlatnite mostove (The Golden Bridges), stone run

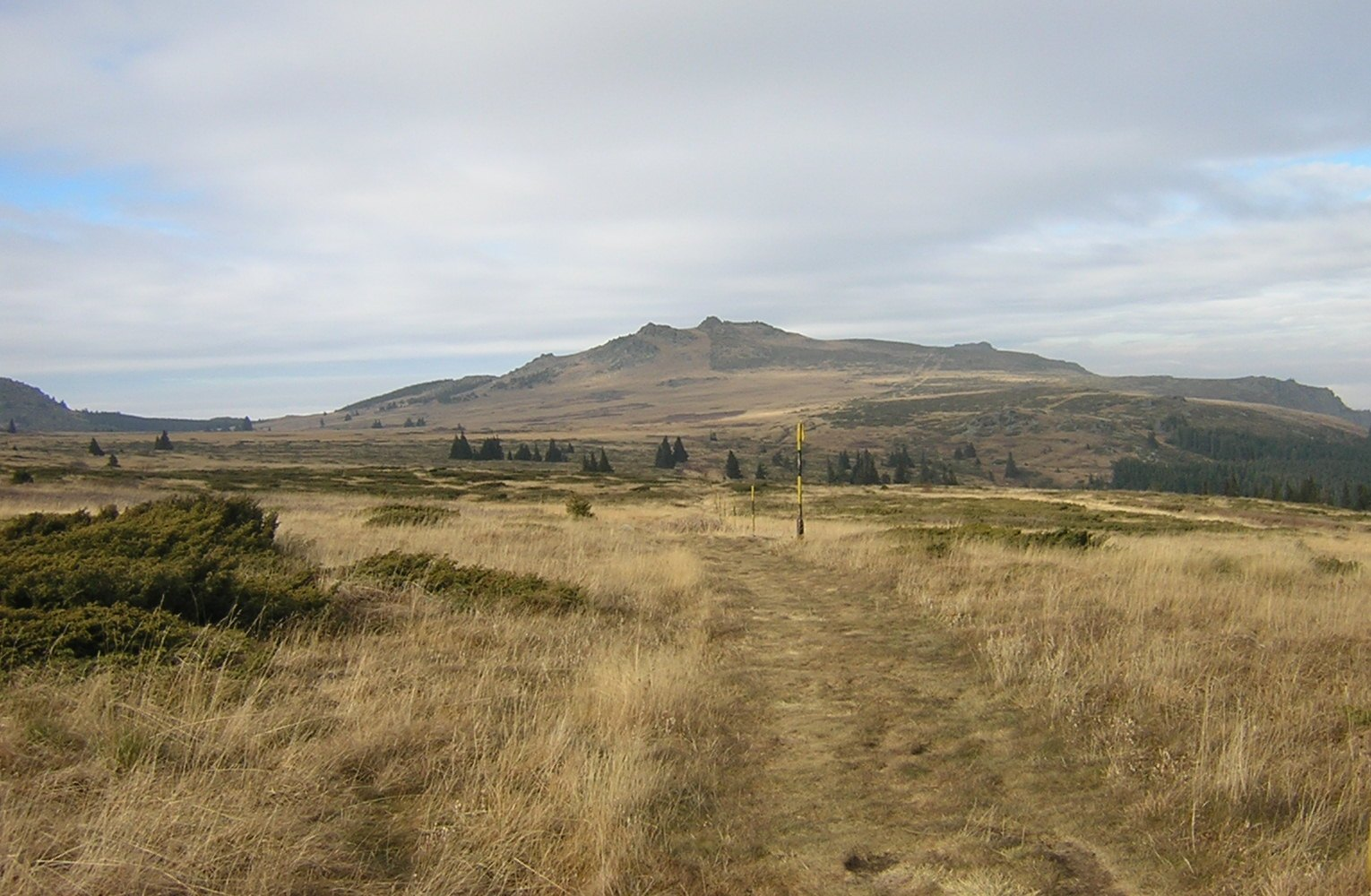
The Plateau, with Torfeno Branishte. Ushite and Kamen Del peaks in the background

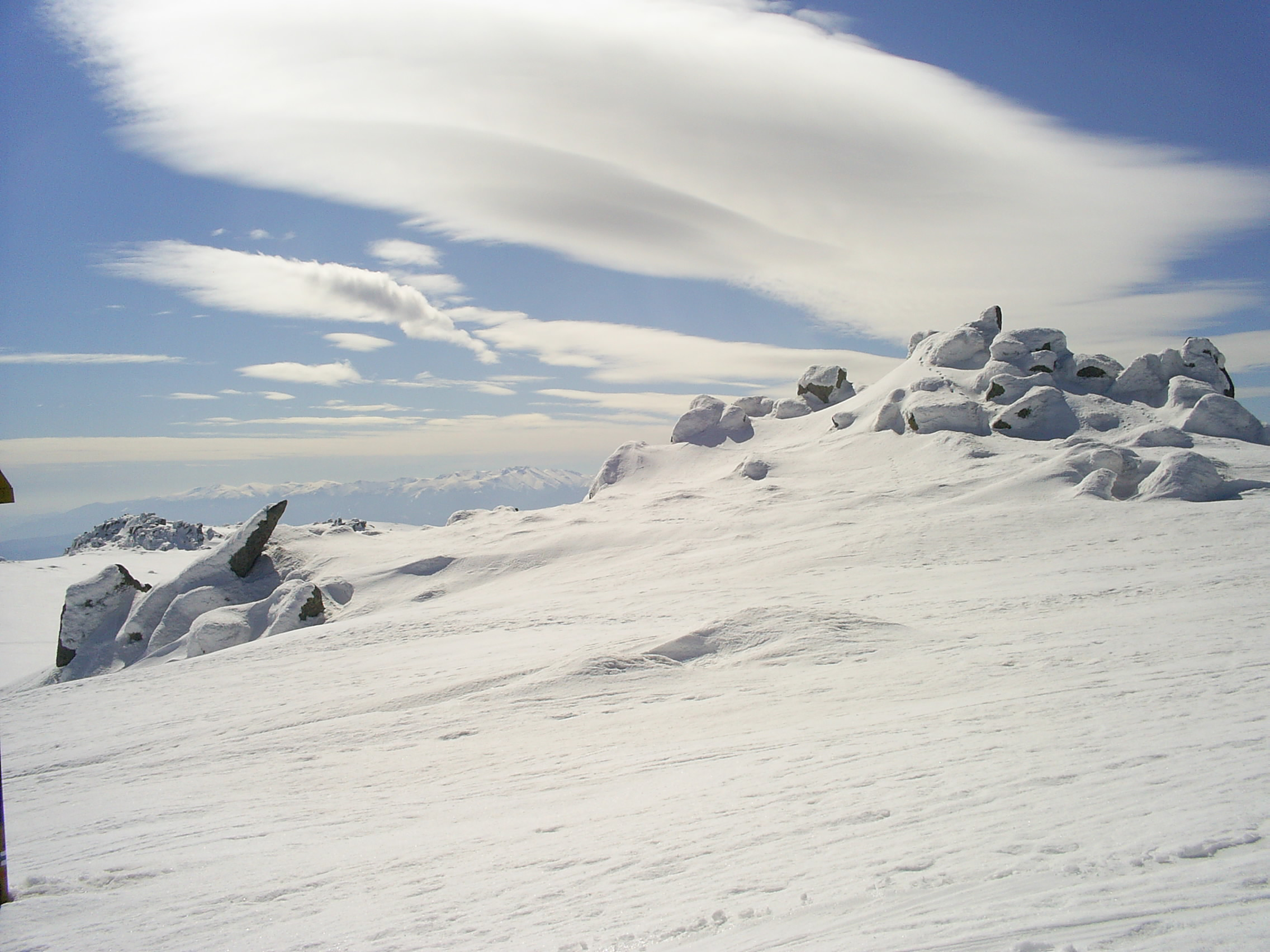
View of Cherni Vrah

== Honours ==
Vitosha Saddle, Rezen Knoll, Komini Peak, and Kikish Crag on Livingston Island in the South Shetland Islands, Antarctica are named respectively for Mount Vitosha, and for the Vitosha peaks of Malak Rezen and Golyam Rezen, Kominite Peak, and Kikish site.

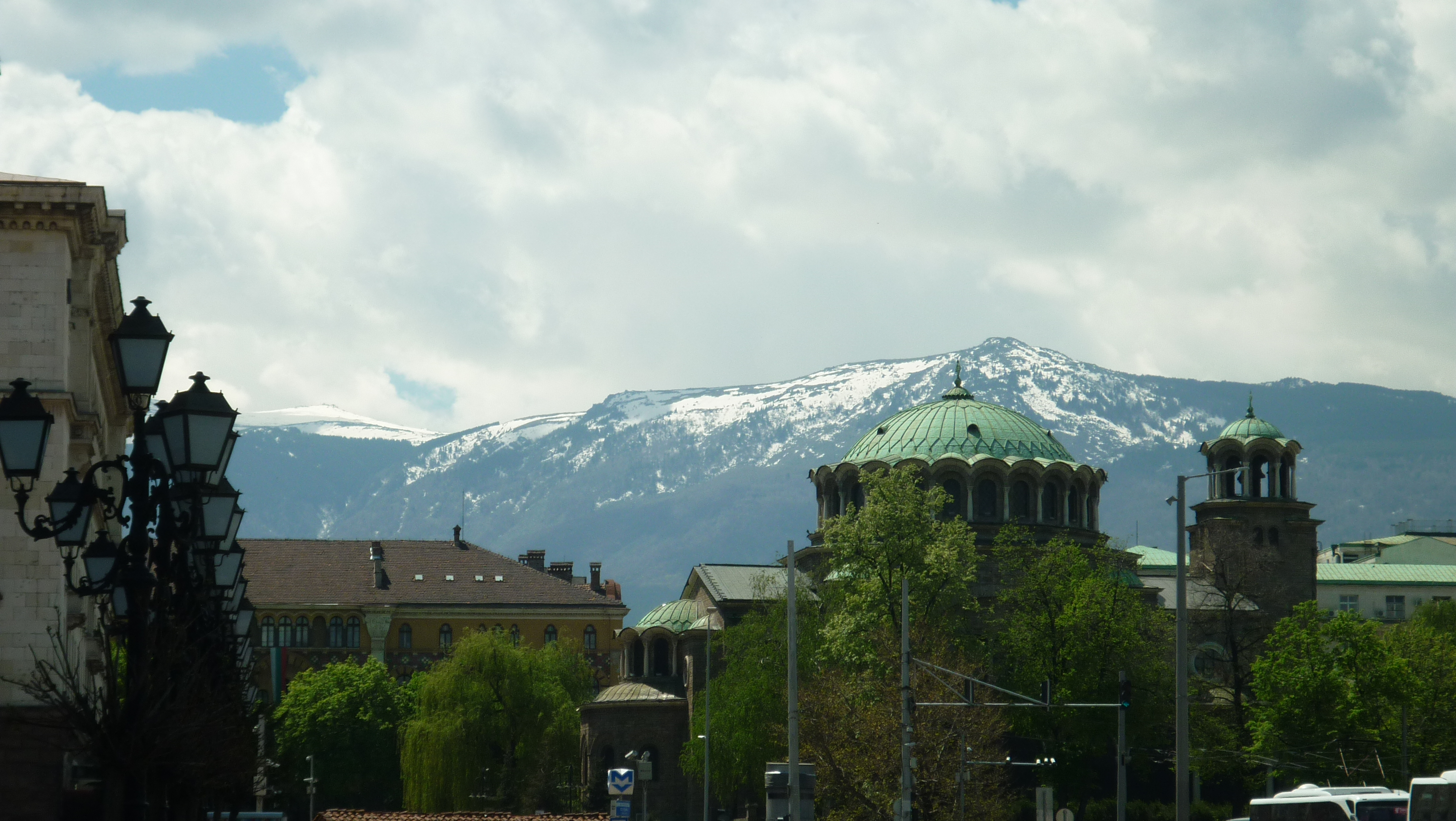
Vitosha seen from Sofia

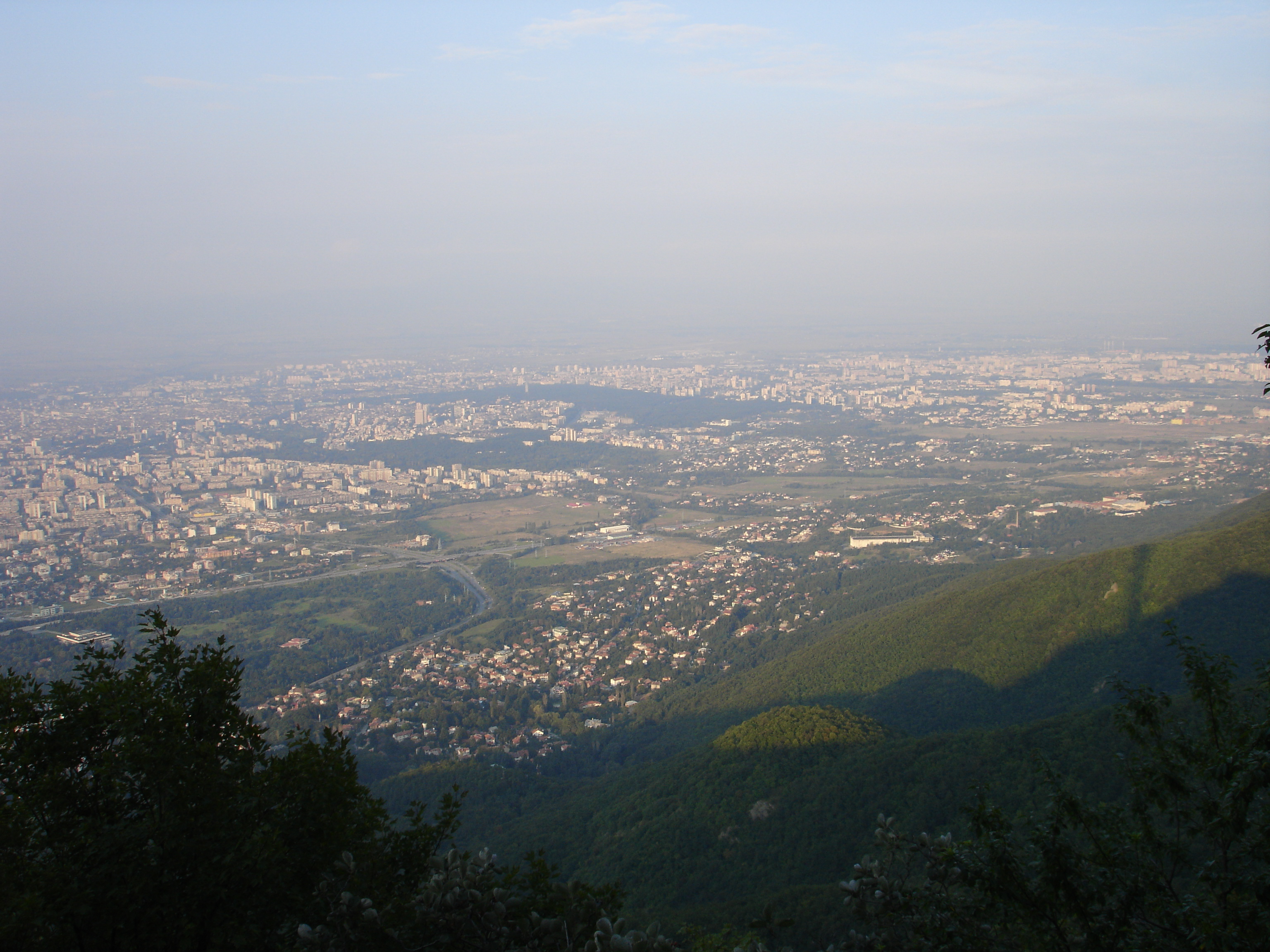
East Sofia seen from Vitosha

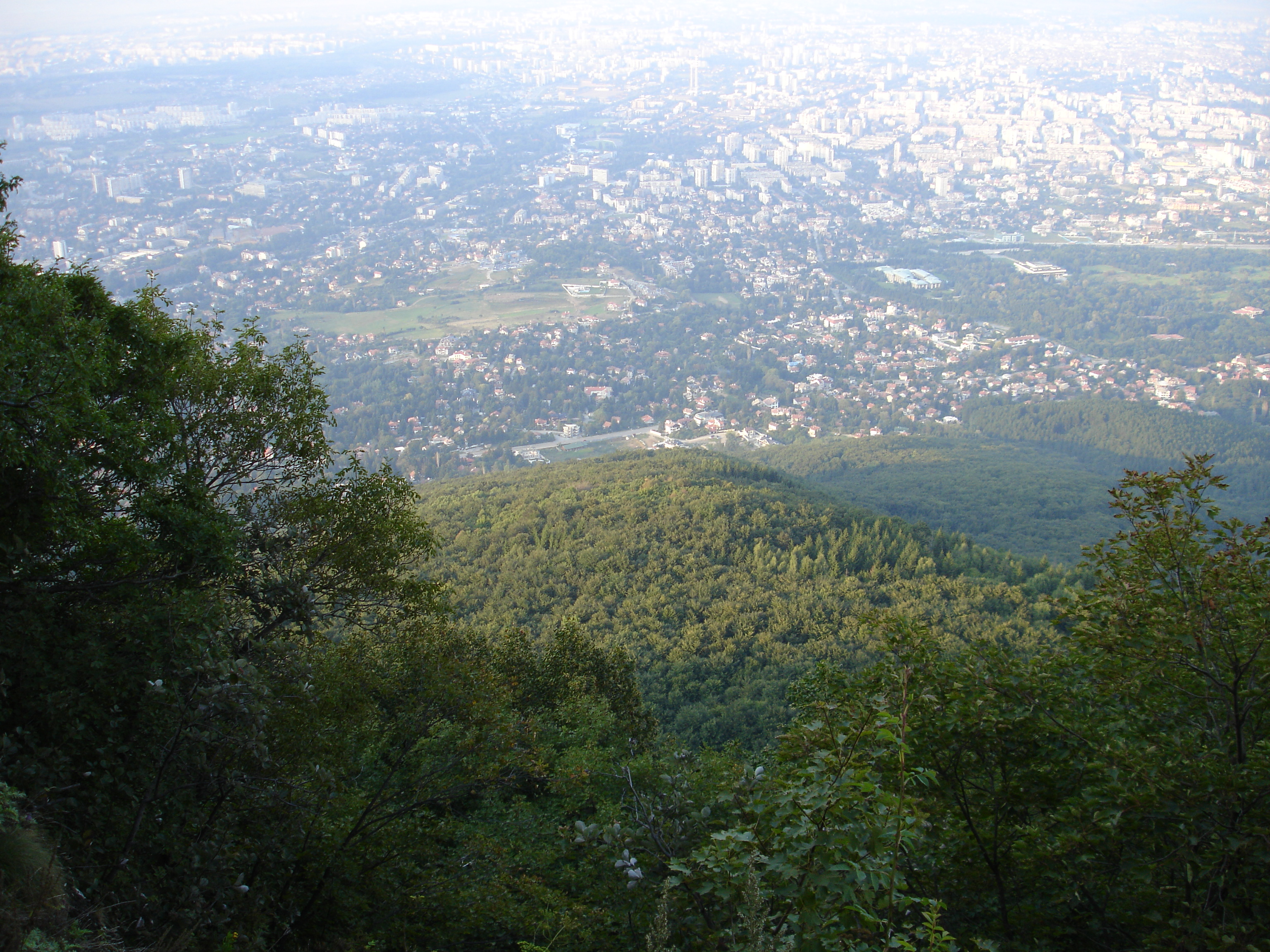
Another view

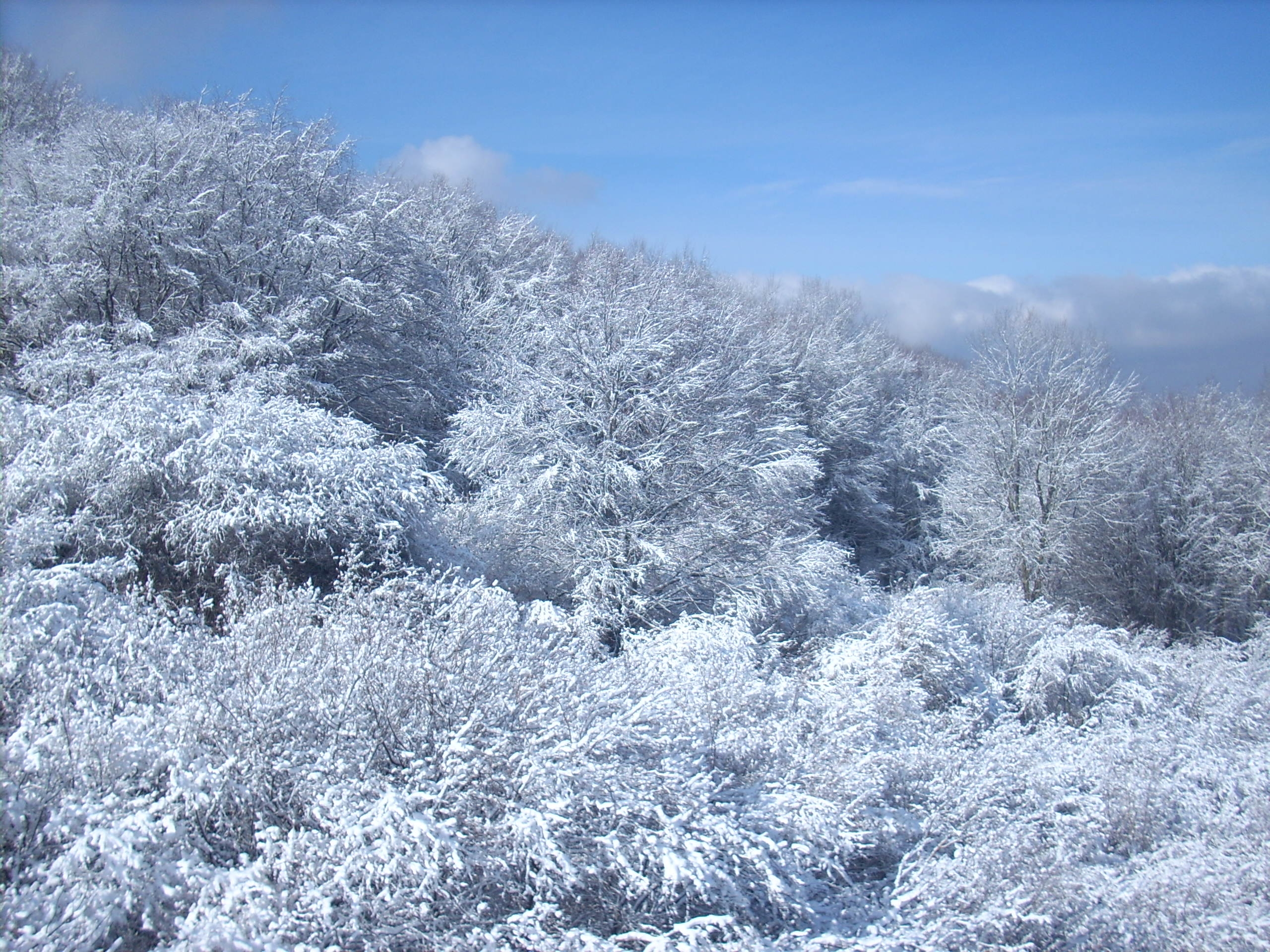
Snow-covered trees in February, northern side

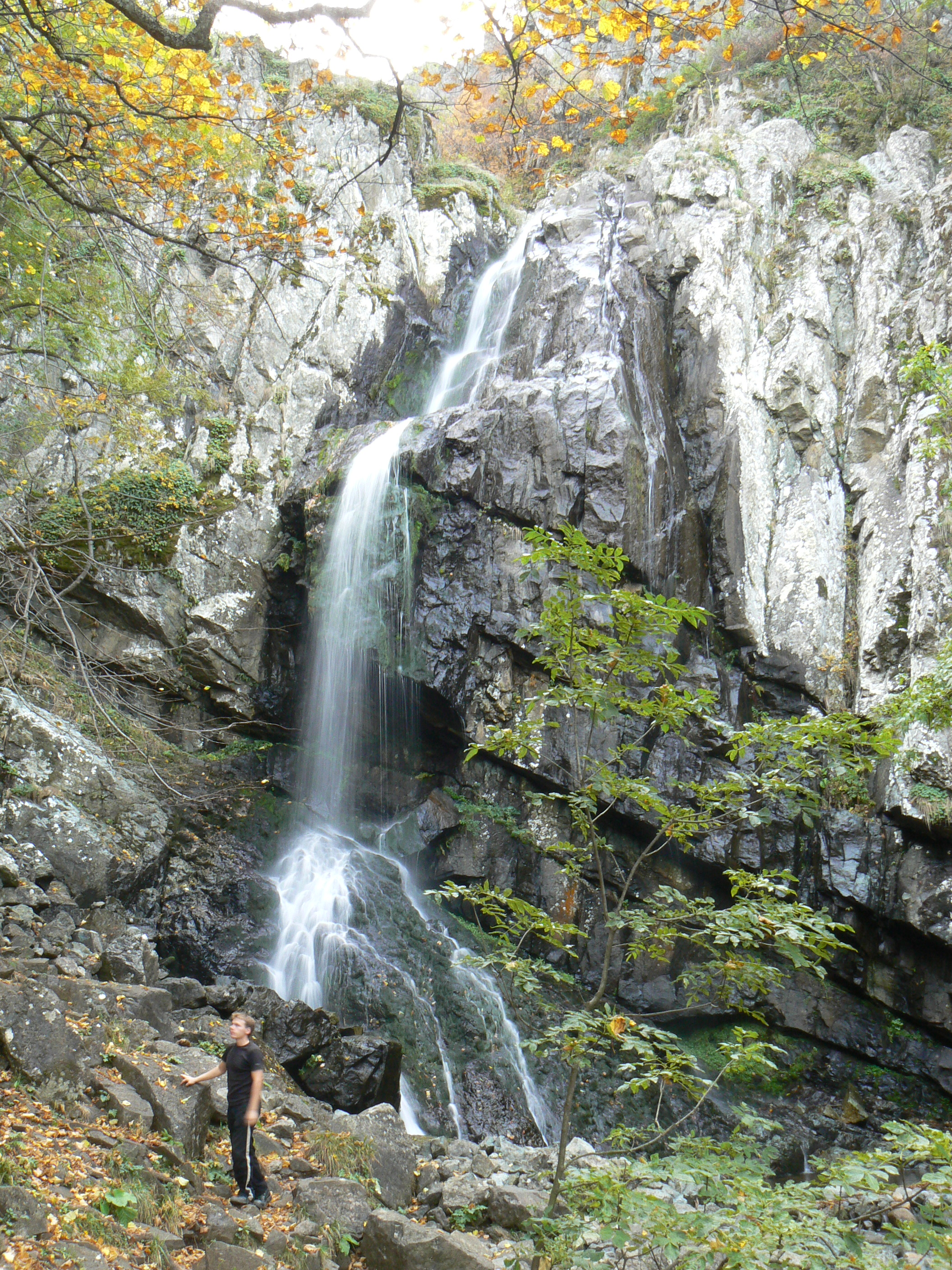
Boyana waterfall, highest in Vitosha

View of the Vitosha Mountain from the South Park of Sofia

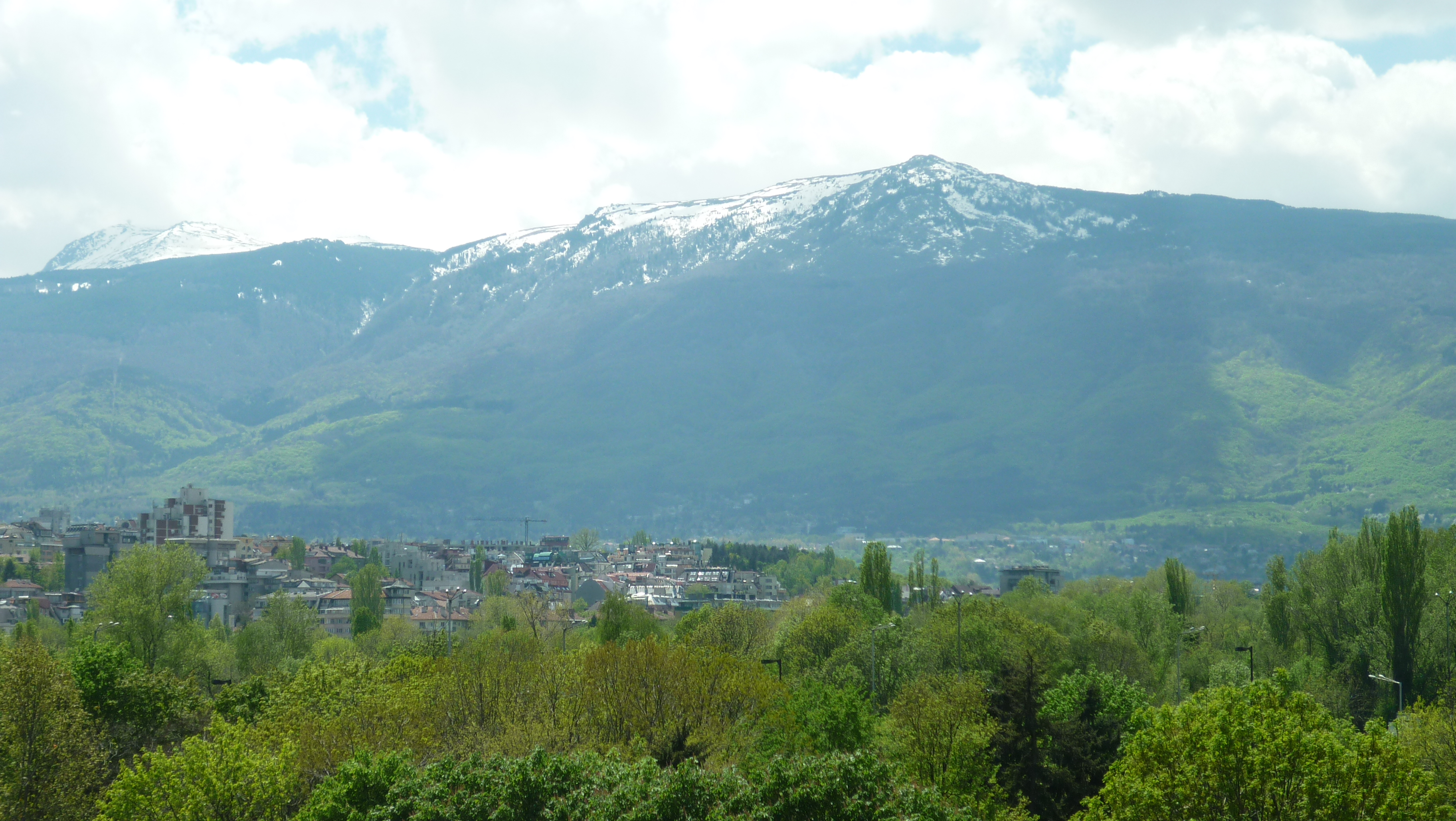
Vitosha seen from National Palace of Culture

Vitosha is also the name of:

- Radio Vitosha
- Vitosha Boulevard - a popular main street in Sofia; with shops, boutiques and restaurants.

== See also ==
- Stone rivers
- Aleko
- Geography of Bulgaria
- List of mountains in Bulgaria
- List of mountains of the Balkans
- List of ecoregions in Bulgaria
- List of protected areas of Bulgaria
- Rila
- Pirin
- Balkan Mountains
- Rhodope Mountains
