= Elin Pelin Municipality =

Coordinates: 42°40′23″N 23°36′7″E

Elin Pelin Municipality Община Елин Пелин
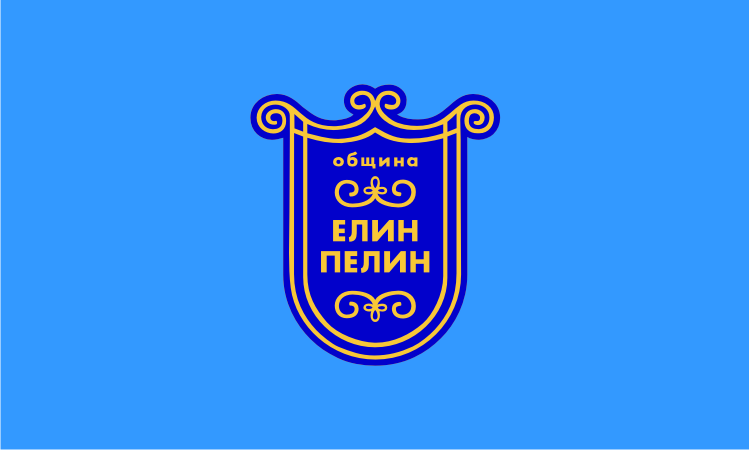
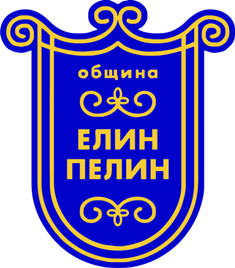
- Flag Coat of arms

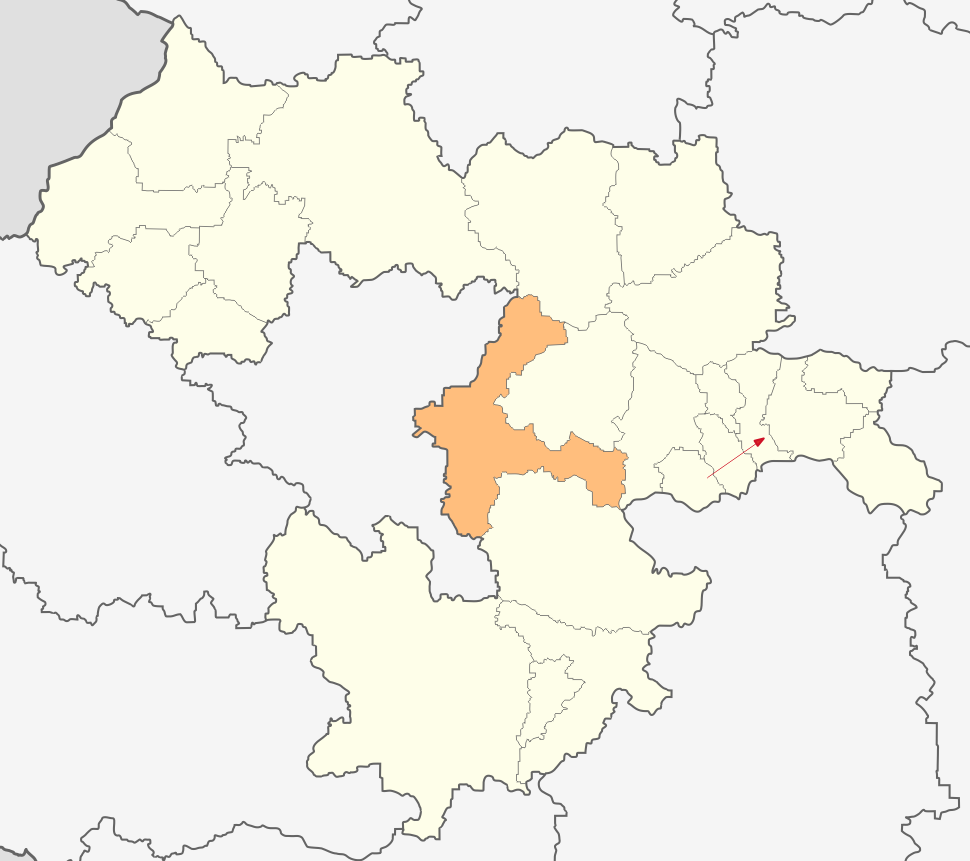
- Country: Bulgaria
- Province: Sofia Province
- Seat: Elin Pelin

Area
  - Total: 452.1 km^{2} (174.6 sq mi)

Population (2024)
  - Total: 22,841
  - Density: 50.52/km^{2} (130.9/sq mi)
- Website: www.elinpelin.bg/home.html

Elin Pelin Municipality (Bulgarian: Община Елин Пелин) is a municipality in Sofia Province, western Bulgaria. Covering a territory of 452.1 km^{2}, it is the fifth largest of the 22 municipalities in the province and takes 6.38% of its total area.

== Geography ==
The relief of the municipality is varied. To the north lies a short stretch of the Balkan Mountains topped by the summit of Murgash (1,687 m), which is the highest point of the administrative division. In its center are the eastern reaches of the Sofia Valley and further south rise the northern slopes of the Sredna Gora mountain range.

The most important river is the Lesnovska reka, a right tributary of the Iskar of the Danube drainage. Its tributaries, the Eleshnitsa and the Makotsevska reka, drain the remained of the municipal territory. In the upper course of the Lesnovska reka is the Ognyanovo Reservoir.

== Transport ==
Elin Pelin Municipality has a strategic location in terms of connectivity and is traversed by major national and international routes. There are seven roads of the national network with a total length of 86.9 km, as well as local road, including an 8.1 km section of the Trakiya motorway (A1), a 16 km section of the Hemus motorway (A2), an 18.8 km stretch of the first class I-1 road Vidin–Sofia–Blagoevgrad–Kulata, an 11.8 km section of the first class I-6 road Gyueshevo–Sofia–Karlovo–Burgas, a 10.1 km stretch of the first class I-8 road Kalotina–Sofia–Plovdiv–Kapitan Andreevo, the whole 17.4 km length of the third class III-105 road, and the last 4.7 km of the third class III-6002 road.

It is also traversed by a 15.6 km section of railway line No. 1 Kalotina–Sofia–Plovdiv–Kapitan Andreevo, a 5.7 km stretch of railway line No. 3 Sofia–Karlovo–Sliven–Karnobat–Varna, and the final 6.5 km of the railway between Vakarel and Garba.

== Demography ==
Historical population
Year	Pop.	±%
1934	22,625	—
1946	22,610	−0.1%
1956	25,428	+12.5%
1965	26,954	+6.0%
1975	27,991	+3.8%
1985	26,945	−3.7%
1992	24,791	−8.0%
2001	24,072	−2.9%
2011	22,841	−5.1%
2021	23,104	+1.2%
Source: National Statistics Institute

As of 2024 the population of Elin Pelin Municipality is 22,841, living in one town and 18 villages:

- Bogdanlia
- Churek
- Gabra
- Elin Pelin (village)
- Elin Pelin (town)
- Golema Rakovitsa
- Grigorevo
- Doganovo
- Eleshnitsa
- Karapoltsi
- Krushovitsa
- Lesnovo
- Musachevo
- Novi Han
- Ognyanovo
- Petkovo
- Potop
- Ravno Pole
- Stolnik

== Gallery ==
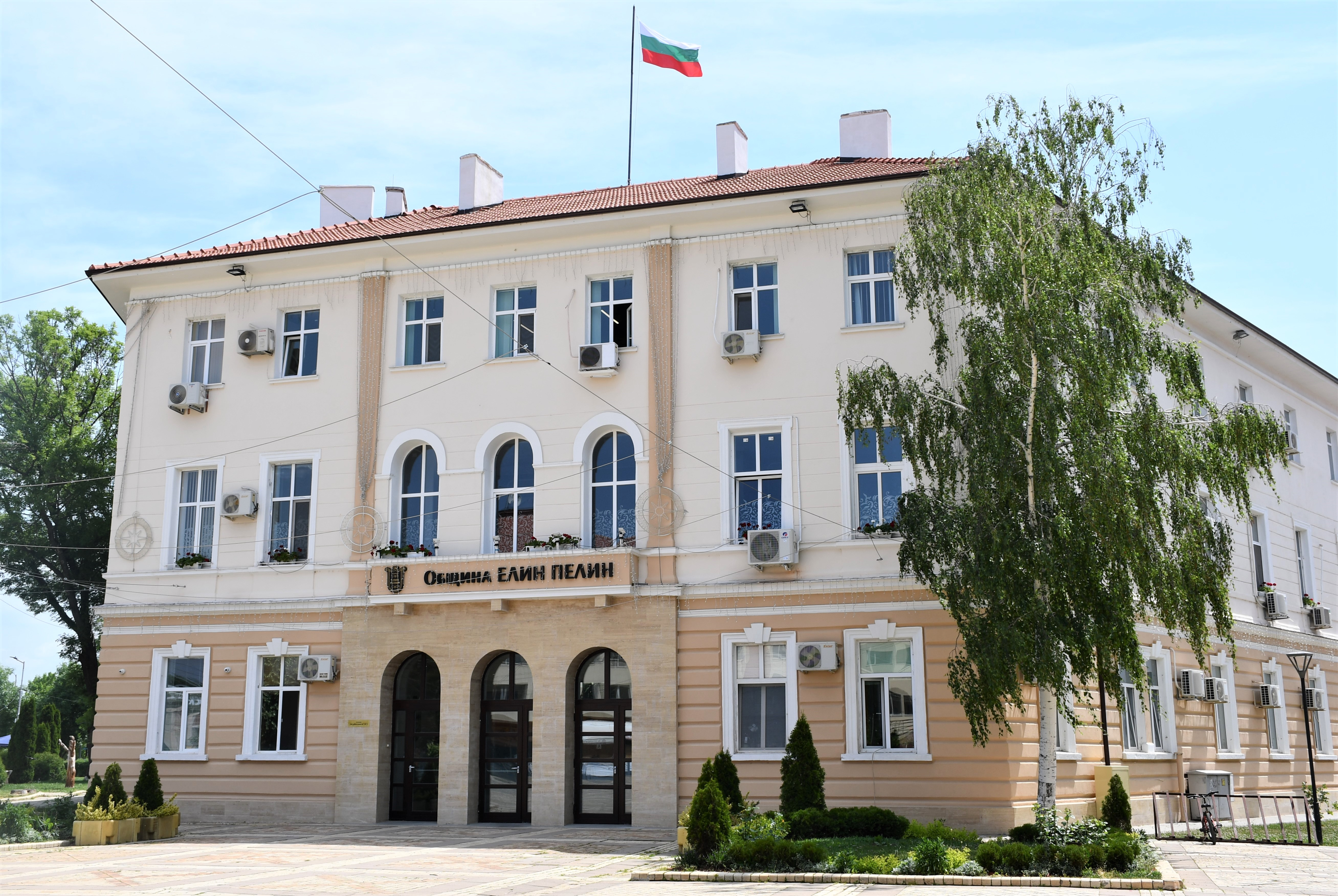
Elin Pelin Town Hall

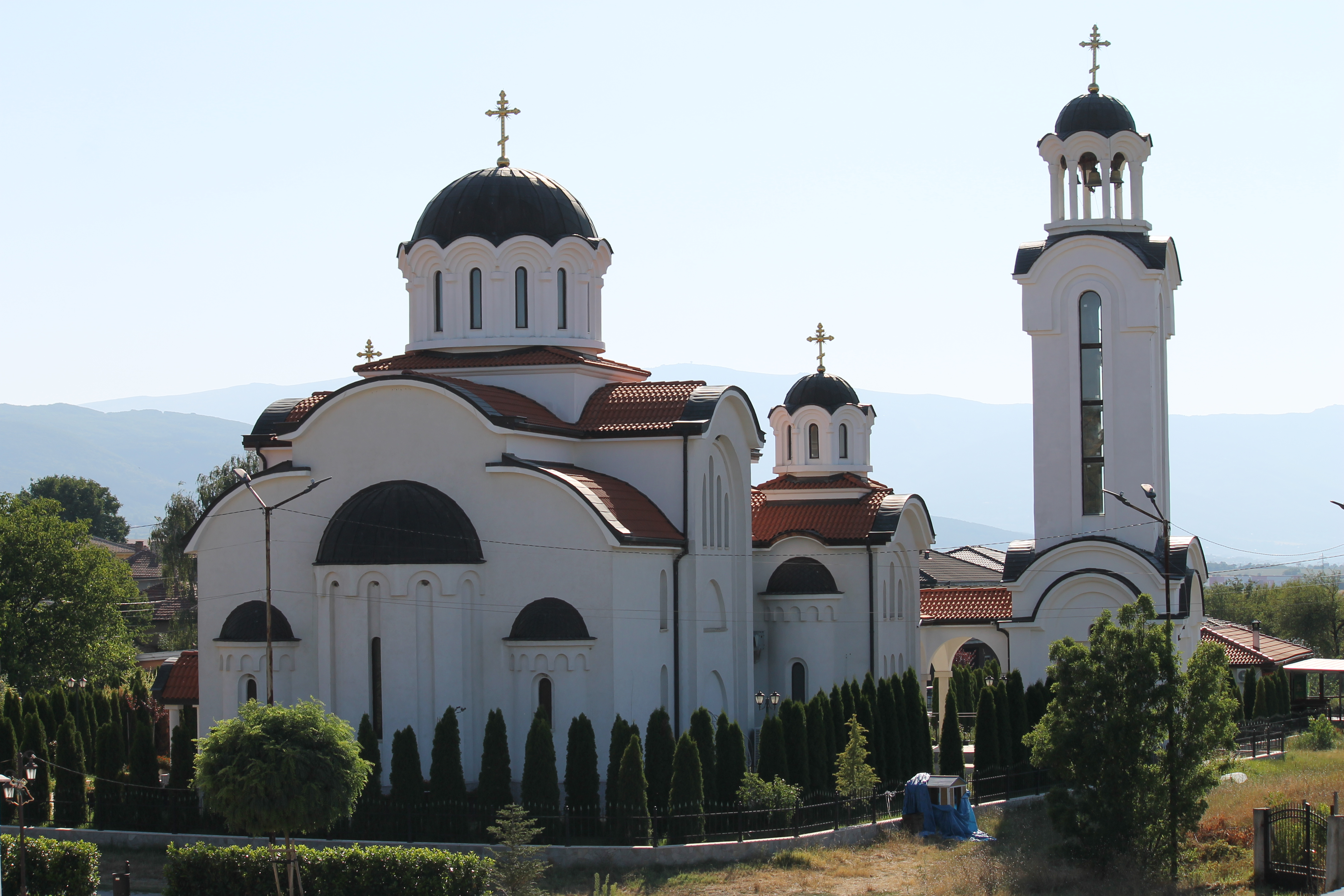
A church in Elin Pelin (village)

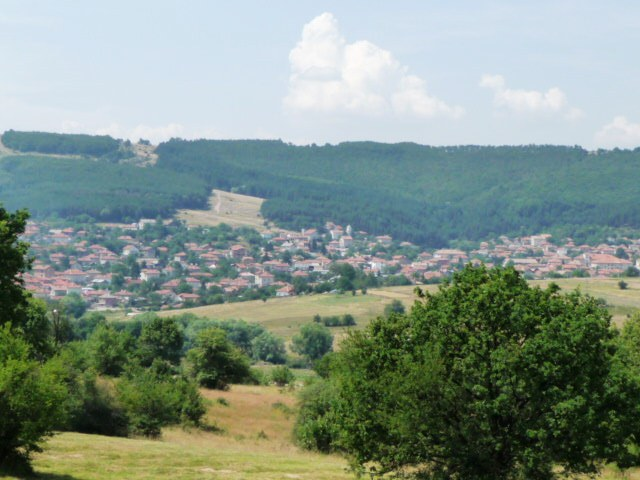
Gabra

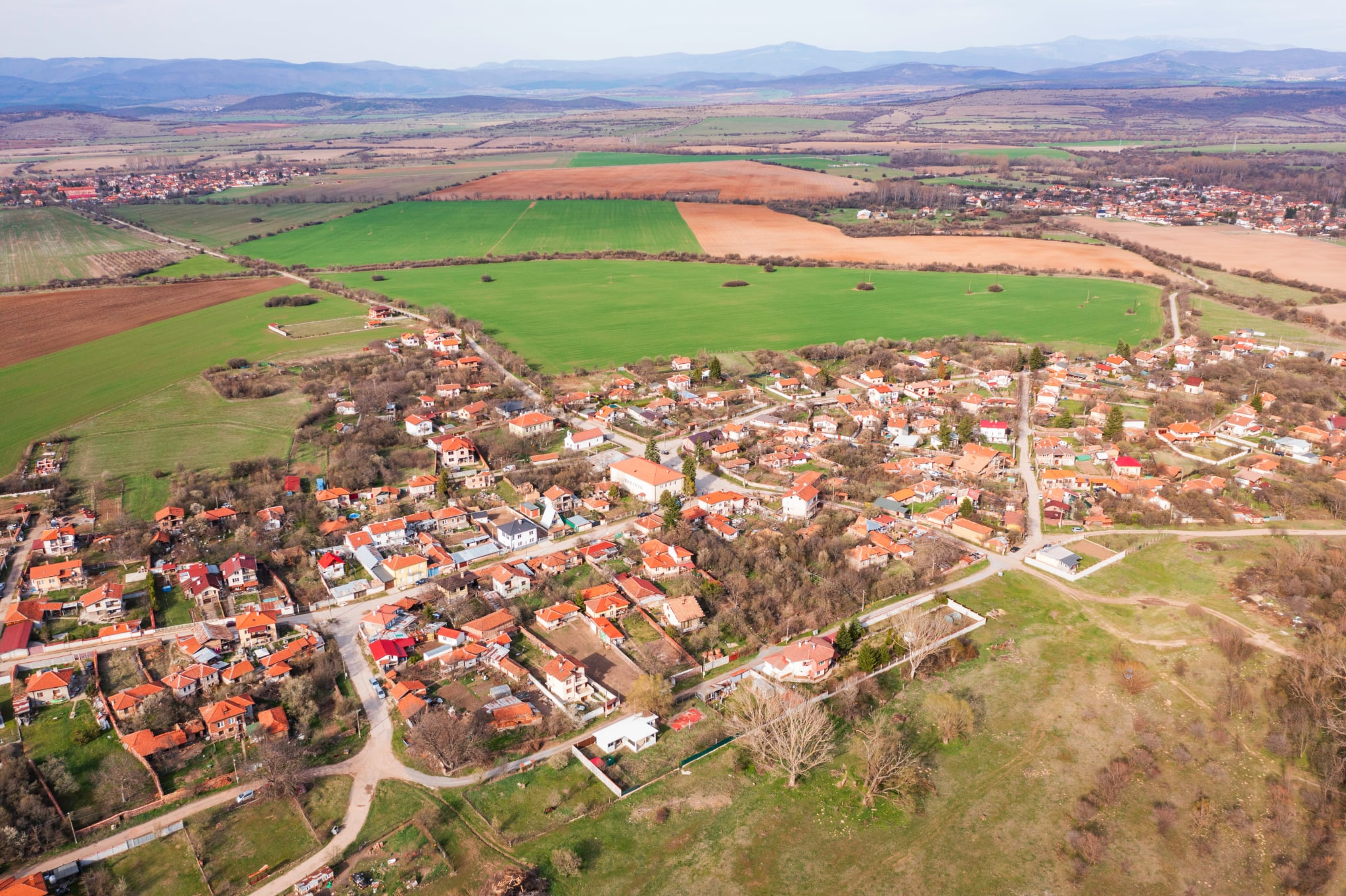
Bogdanlia
