= Golema Rakovitsa =

Golema Rakovitsa Голeма Раковица
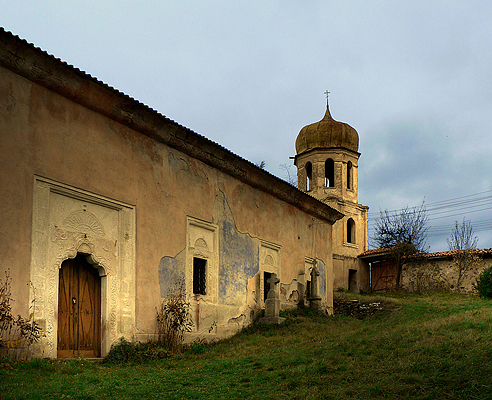
- The church in Golema Rakovitsa

- Location of Golema Rakovitsa
- Coordinates: 42°37′20″N 23°48′00″E
- Country: Bulgaria
- Provinces (Oblast): Sofia

Government
- Elevation: 693 m (2,274 ft)

Population (2009)
  - Total: 433
- Time zone: UTC+2 (EET)
  - Summer (DST): UTC+3 (EEST)
- Postal Code: 2113

Golema Rakovitsa (Bulgarian: Голема Раковица) is a village in western Bulgaria, part of Elin Pelin Municipality, Sofia Province.

== Geography ==
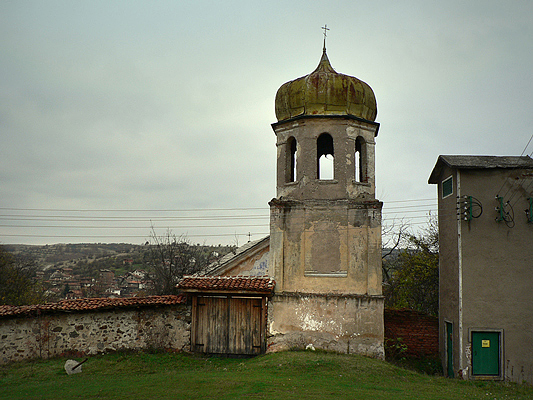
The church in 2008

Golema Rakovitsa is situated near the eastern end of the Sofia Valley, at the western foot of Sredna Gora mountain. It is located just where the Lopushina and Ravna rivers flow together to form the Lesnovo River. From the village border starts the upper part of Ognyanovo Reservoir. Elin Pelin, the main town of the municipality, is about 18 kilometres (11 mi) to the west.

An annual from the Bulgarian National Library, published in 1928, indicates that in the middle of 19th century there were 180 houses in the village. It was the biggest settlement in the eastern Sofia district at the time. In comparison, Elin Pelin, named Novoseltsi back then, was listed as having 125 houses. Just after the First World War there were 2,200 residents in the village. However, when the communist regime took the rule in the country, private property was strongly limited and the farming realties were nationalized. The population started permanently decreasing because of migration, mostly to Sofia. Nowadays about 400 people remain in Golema Rakovitsa.

== History and culture ==
The village was set on fire twice during the 19th century by Ottoman troops. The native Gato Shishkov was among the followers of the revolutionary Vasil Levski who visited the village several times. It was reported that another Bulgarian revolutionary, Georgi Benkovski, also passed through the village. During the Balkan Wars in 1912 a man from Rakovitsa was a member of the Macedonian-Adrianopolitan Volunteer Corps.

The majority of the inhabitants are Christians adhering to the Bulgarian Orthodox Church. In the village there is a church named after St Nicholas built in 1857. In the church yard are the remains of an old religious school which was restored in 2005 and turned into a museum.

The two-storied building of the modern school was constructed in 1923-1924. It was a comprehensive school named after the Saints Cyril and Methodius. After operating for more than 60 years, the school was closed down in 1994 and the building was abandoned. Every year on 2 May, there is a local village celebration called Sabor, dedicated to the April Uprising.

== Gallery ==
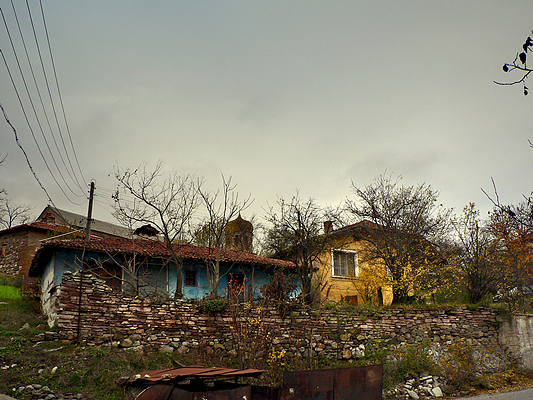
The village in 2008

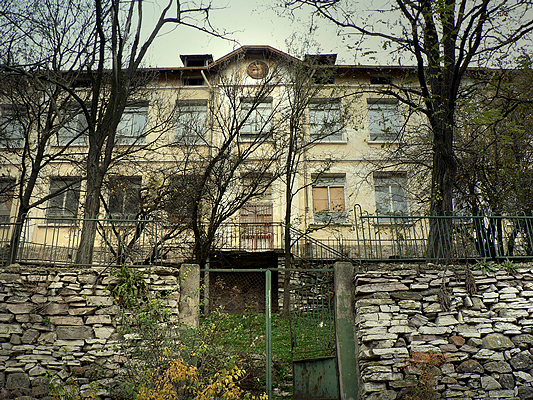
The abandoned school

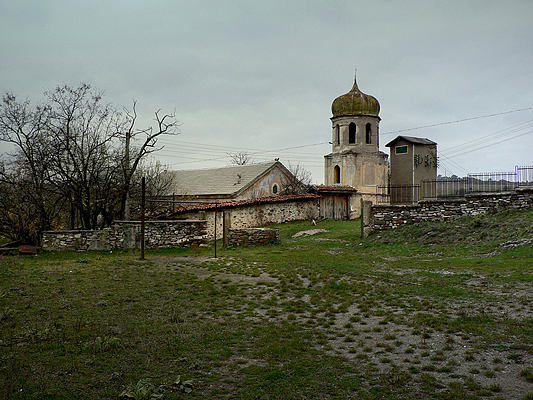
A view towards the church from the school yard

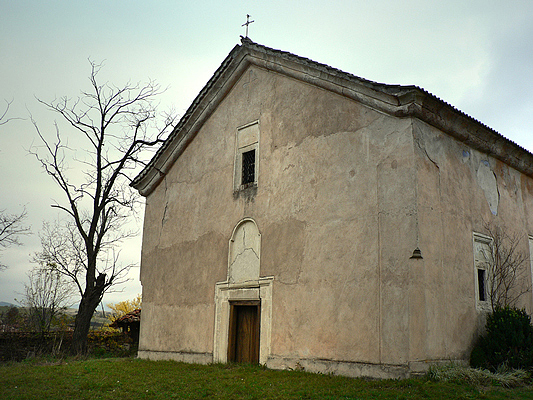
