= Dora Draganova =

Bulgarian composer (born 1946)

Dora Draganova (Bulgarian: Дора Драганова) (born 29 January 1946) is a Bulgarian composer.

== Life ==
Dora Draganova was born in Sofia, Bulgaria, the daughter of composer Illya Draganov. She studied composition at the State Academy of Music with Parashkev Hadjiev and Vesselin Stoyanov. After graduating in 1972, she taught piano at the Lyubomir Pipkov National Music High School and harmony at the National Dance Art High School (formerly the State Choreographic High School). She edited the choral literature magazine Native Song from 1971 to 1991. She won the first prize in Dobrich in 1999 for the musical play Pippi Long-Stocking after Astrid Lindgren. Her piano collection Children’s Corner also received an award from the Union of Bulgarian Composers.

== Works ==
Dora Draganova composes for stage and chamber ensemble, choral and pop performance and film soundtrack.

- Comic Opera The King – Basket-Maker in one act (1972)
- Yan Bibiyan (1986; by the children's fantasy novel Yan Bibiyan)
- Pippi Long-Stockings (1989)
- Sunny Circles – TV musical play (1989)
- Serenade for flute (violin), oboe, clarinet, viola and violoncello (1996)
- String Quartet (1975)
- Book of the Specks for violin, viola, piano and reader (1994) *Souvenir from Morocco for violin, guitar and piano (1998)
- Waltz for violin and piano (1997)
- Reverse River (1980)
- Star Drops (1983)
- Autumnal Woman (1996)
- Sonatina (1971)
- Sonata (1972)
- Children's Corner Cycle (1972)
- Pussy Cat Has Read Little Books (released on CD in 1988 and on audiocassette in 1992)
- Early-Rising Cock – songs for the youngest (released on audiocassette in 1998)
- The Sly Little Mouse (released on audiocassette in 1999)
