= Eleshnitsa, Sofia Province =

Eleshnitsa Елешница
- Village
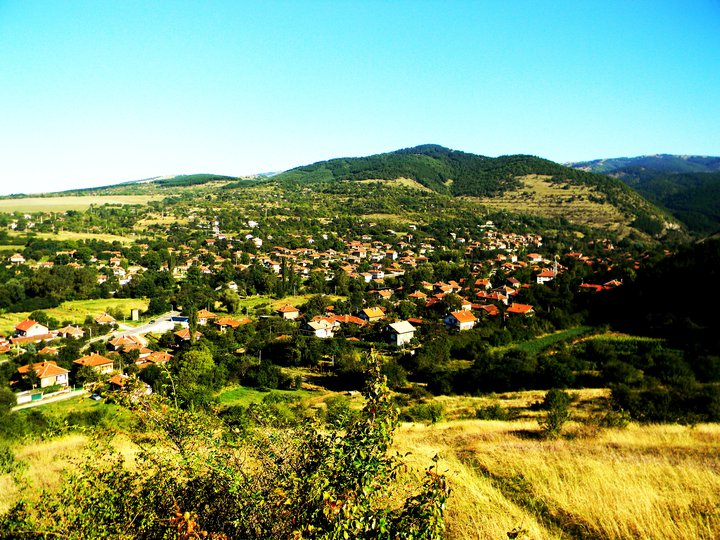
- Look toward the village

- Location within Bulgaria
- Coordinates: 42°44′33.473″N 23°37′31.3287″E
- Country: Bulgaria
- Province: Sofia Province
- Municipality: Elin Pelin Municipality

Area
  - Total: 33.851 km^{2} (13.070 sq mi)
- Elevation: 723 m (2,372 ft)

Population (2014-12-15)
  - Total: 412
  - Density: 12.2/km^{2} (31.5/sq mi)
- Time zone: UTC+2 (EET)
  - Summer (DST): UTC+3 (EEST)
- Post code: 2125
- Area code: 071502

Eleshnitsa is a village in Elin Pelin Municipality, in Sofia Province, Bulgaria.

== Geography ==
Eleshnitsa is located in a mountainous area in the foothills of the Balkan Mountains, at the foot of Mount Murgash 25 km northeast of Sofia and 10 km north of Elin Pelin. The Eleshnitsa River springs near Mount Murgash and passes through Eleshnitsa. The old road from Sofia to Botevgrad and the Hemus motorway are in the immediate vicinity.

== History ==
From 1959 to 1991 the village was named Yordankino.

== Cultural and natural attractions ==
The Eleshnitsa Monastery is near the village.
