= Elin Pelin (village) =

Elin Pelin Елин Пелин
- Village
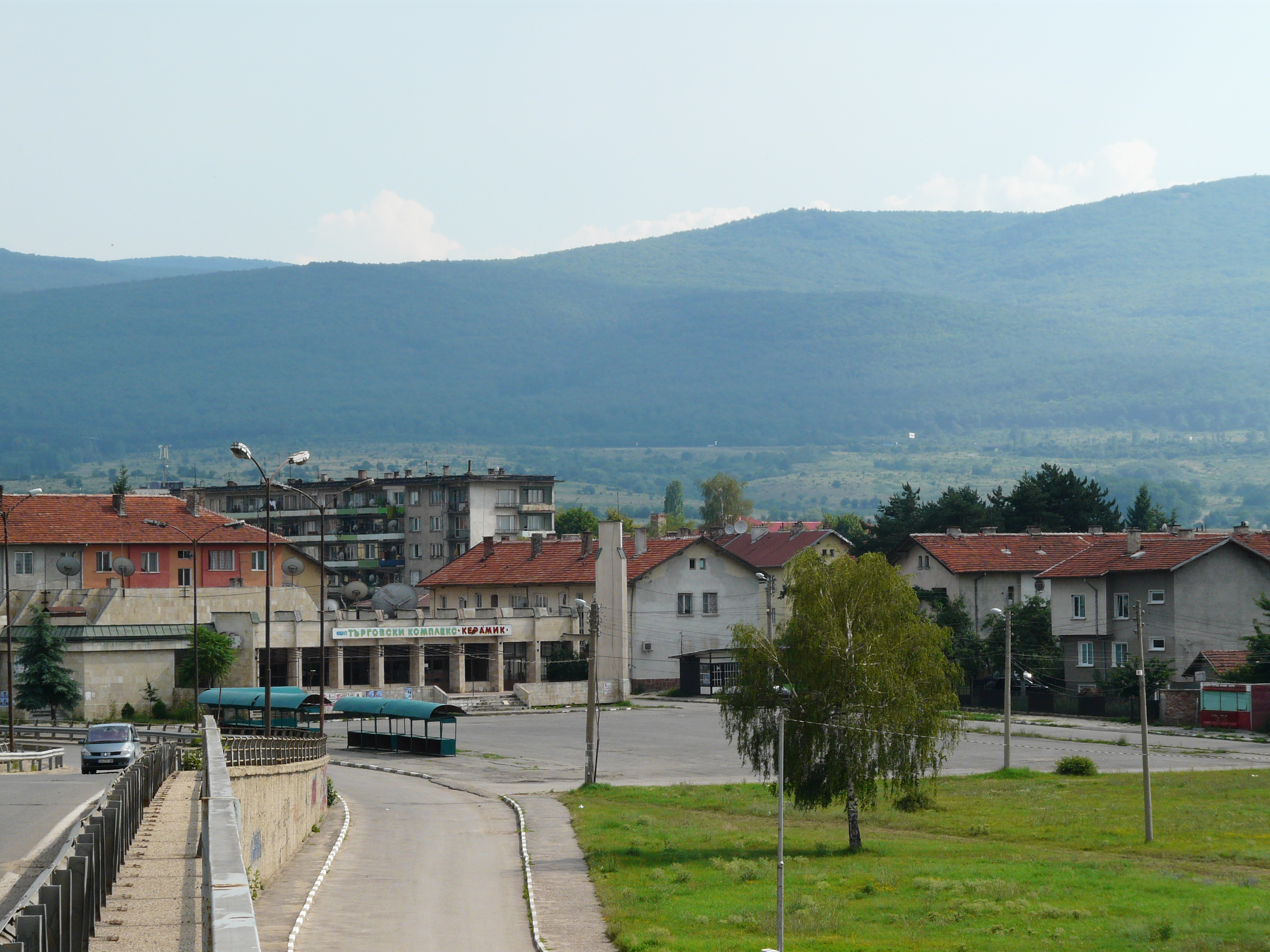
- View of the village square

- Location in Bulgaria
- Coordinates: 42.6278°N 23.5831°E
- Country: Bulgaria
- Province: Sofia Province
- Municipality: Elin Pelin

Population (2024)
  - Total: 3,168
- Time zone: UTC+2 (EET)
  - Summer (DST): UTC+3 (EEST)

Elin Pelin (Bulgarian: Елин Пелин), widely referred to as Gara Elin Pelin (Bulgarian: Гара Елин Пелин, lit. 'Elin Pelin Station') is a village in western Bulgaria. It is located within the Sofia Province and Elin Pelin Municipality. As of the 2024 population census, the village had a population of 3,168.

== Geography ==
The village is located about 23 kilometres (14 mi) east of Sofia and is itself situated between the town of Elin Pelin and the neighboring village of Novi Han. It is on Railway line No. 1 "Kalotina-Zapad–Svilengrad".

The European route E80 and the nationally designated Trakia motorway (A1) run about 3 kilometres (1.9 mi) south of the village.

The average altitude of the village is about 550 metres (1,800 ft) above sea level. To the southwest of the village are the Lozen Mountain and Vitosha Mountain, to the east is the Sredna Gora Mountain range, and to the north are the Balkan Mountains.

== History ==
Elin Pelin village emerged as a settlement around the later half of the 19th century near the railway station on the Tsaribrod–Vakarel line, increasing in size after the Sofia–Septemvri railway line was put into operation. The settlement formed and grew in relation to the nearby Novoseltsi's railway station, which was located at the railway line's closest point to the village.

The settlement underwent a series of changes in its official status regarding settlement type and administrative-territorial affiliation between the 1950s and 1990s.

On 17 December 1955, the settlement, formed around the railway station of the nearby village of Elin Pelin (Novoseltsi until 1950), received the status of a village, with the name "Gara Elin Pelin", literally translating to "Elin Pelin Station".

On 6 February 1960, the villages of Elin Pelin and Gara Elin Pelin were united into the town of Elin Pelin. In the beginning of 1975, the village was separated from the town of Elin Pelin, becoming part of the municipality of Gara Elin Pelin. On 26 December 1978, it returned to the municipality of the town of Elin Pelin. On 18 July 1995, the official name of the village was changed to "Elin Pelin", which is its current name.

However, despite the official change many residents still refer to the village as "Gara Elin Pelin" or simply "Garata" (meaning "the station"). Even much of the signage in the village refers to it as "Gara Elin Pelin", instead of its official name.
