= Bibiyan =

Yan Bibiyan may refer to:

- Yan Bibiyan, Bulgarian children's fantasy novel by Elin Pelin
- The protagonist of the novel
- Manouchehr Bibiyan, spelling variant of the founder of Iranian TV channel Jaam-e-Jam
