= Dobri Dobrev =

Bulgarian ascetic (1914–2018)

- Добри Добрев
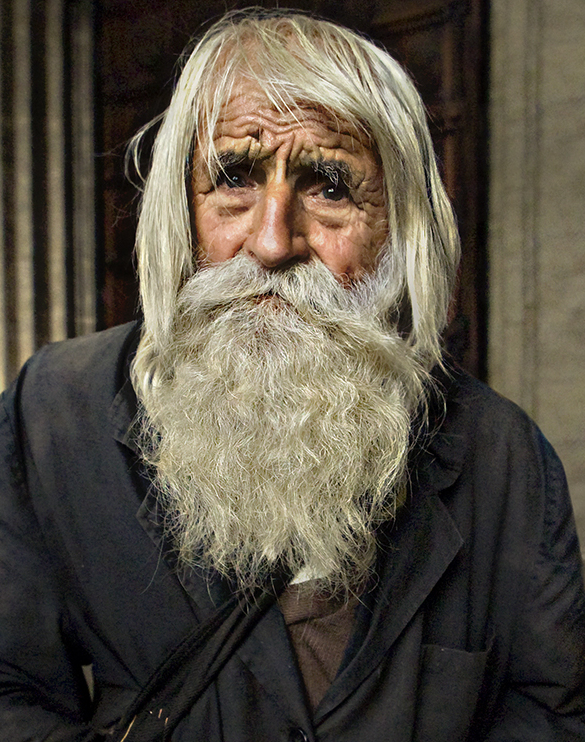
- Dobri Dobrev in 2006
- Born: Dobri Dimitrov Dobrev; 20 July 1914; Bailovo, Bulgaria
- Died: 13 February 2018 (aged 103); Kremikovtsi Monastery, Bulgaria
- Other names: Elder Dobri, Grandpa Dobri, The Saint of Bailovo
- Occupation: Ascetic
- Known for: Charity
- Children: 4

Dobri Dimitrov Dobrev (Bulgarian: Добри Димитров Добрев, pronounced [ˈdɔbri dimiˈtrɔf ˈdɔbrɛf]; 20 July 1914 – 13 February 2018), better known as Grandpa Dobri, Elder Dobri (Bulgarian: Дядо Добри, romanized: Dyado Dobri) or The Saint of Bailovo, was a Bulgarian ascetic who walked over 20 kilometres (12 mi) each day to sit or stand in front of the Cathedral of Alexander Nevsky in Sofia to collect money for charitable causes. Dobrev donated all the money he collected to charities, orphanages, churches, and monasteries. He turned 100 in July 2014. In Bulgarian, his name translates as "good" or "kind".

== Early life ==
Dobrev was born on 20 July 1914 in the village of Bailovo. His father, Dimitar, died in World War I and his mother, Katerina, had to raise their children by herself.

== Adult life ==
Over the years, Dobrev became detached from the material aspects of life and devoted himself entirely to the spiritual world, specifically in the Orthodox faith. Around the year 2000, he decided to donate all his belongings to the Orthodox church when he began to live very modestly in a small extension to the Saints Cyril and Methodius parish church in his native village of Bailovo. About that time, he embarked on his mission to raise funds for the restoration of churches and monasteries across Bulgaria. It is this new direction in life and the example he gave with his asceticism that led many to call him The Saint of Bailovo.

Over the course of his lifetime, Dobrev donated over 80,000 Bulgarian lev (40,900 euro) to churches, monasteries and other noble deeds. Among his biggest donations are:

- 10,000 Bulgarian lev (5,110 €) to the Saints Cyril and Methodius parish church in his native Bailovo
- 25,000 Bulgarian lev (12,780 €) for restoration of the Eleshnishki Monastery Mother Mary located to the east of Sofia, and the local church in the village of Gorno Kamartsi.
- 35,700 Bulgarian lev (18,250 €) for the Cathedral of Alexander Nevsky in Sofia, which is the biggest donation in the known history of the over 100-year-old cathedral.

== Personal life and death ==
Dobrev married around 1940, as Bulgaria joined World War II. In one of the bombings of Sofia, a bomb fell near him and he lost almost all his hearing. Dobrev and his wife had four children, two of whom he outlived. Dobrev was an Orthodox Christian and commonly talked about Jesus to others whether they donated or not. He was usually very thankful to those who donated.

Dobrev died on 13 February 2018, at Kremikovtsi Monastery. He was 103.
