= Eleshnitsa =

Eleshnitsa may refer to:

- Eleshnitsa (Struma), a river in Bulgaria
- Eleshnitsa, Blagoevgrad Province, a village in the Blagoevgrad Province of Bulgaria
- Eleshnitsa, Sofia Province, a village in the Sofia Province of Bulgaria
