= Eleshnitsa Monastery =

Assumption of the Virgin Mary
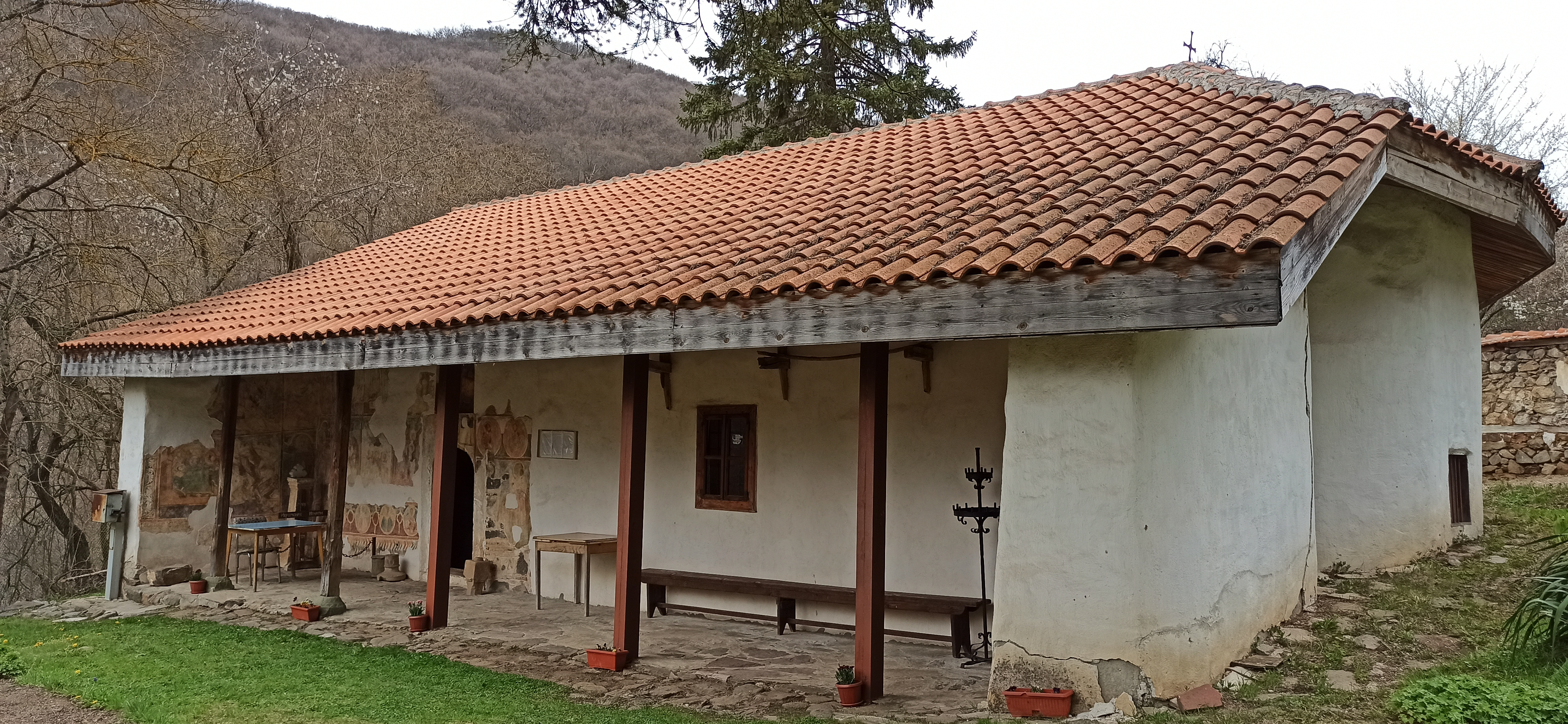
- Church at the Monastery
- Interactive map of Assumption of the Virgin Mary

Monastery information
- Other name: Yakovski monastery
- Order: Eastern Orthodox
- Established: late 14th c.

Site
- Location: Eleshnitsa, Bulgaria
- Coordinates: 42°46′20″N 23°39′03″E

The Eleshnitsa monastery of the Assumption of the Virgin Mary (Bulgarian: Елешнишки манастир „Успение на Пресвета Богородица“) is an active monastery, but currently there are no monks.

== Location ==
The monastery is situated at around 4 km north of the village of Eleshnitsa, Sofia Province, in the Balkan Mountains, at the foot of the Murgash peak. Because of its proximity to the river Yakovishtitsa, it is also known as Yakovski monastery. The monastery is recognised as a cultural and architectural monument.

== History ==
Eleshnitsa monastery was studied in detail and described for the first time by Dimitar Marinov. The year of the building is still unknown. Presumably, a sanctuary was founded there by hermit-monks in 9th century. However, the monastery was established in the late 14th or early 15th century, during the reign of emperor Ivan Alexander (r. 1331–1371), when most monasteries in Sofia region were built. Proof of this is found in the marble inscription from 1499 set in the floor of the temple. There are also preserved frescoes with typical 15–16th-century stylization.

The monastery was renovated and rebuilt in the 16th and 17th centuries. In 1793, the monastery was hit by invasions of kardzhalii bands. In 1799 it was restored only to be looted and destroyed again a few years later. Abbot Daniel began the renovation of the monastery in 1820, as evidenced by an inscription of the same year. The church was repaired and painted by painters from Samokov in 1864.

During the Ottoman period there was a literary center with a school in the Eleshnitsa monastery. A gospel and a psalter from the monastery are now kept in the National Church Historical and Archaeological Museum in Sofia.

Vasil Levski used to hide in the monastery. After the defeat of Botev's rebels in early June 1876, some of the surviving men were sheltered in the monastery. In the first half of the 20th century, a complete renewal of Eleshnitsa Monastery was done. During World War II, the monastery was not functioning. There has been consecutively male and female occupation. After 1966, the monastery went into decline. 1989 saw the beginning of the restoration of the monastery in the old form and style.

== Architecture ==
The church is of size and style typical of the late Middle Ages. It is low, single-aisle and with dimensions of 6,8m to 14,5m, with an entrance from the west. The building consists of two parts, the narthex was added later. Above the door, on the west wall of the nave, there is a donor inscription attesting to the creation and presentation of the church in the 16th century. The best preserved painting is in the main hall. Calligraphic peculiarities and the artistic style of the frescoes testify that they were painted in the late 16th and early 17th century. Over the south door of the narthex, there is a painting of the Assumption of Mary. In the altar, there is painted the scene of the Annunciation flagged by images of the kings David and Solomon. In the apse, the Virgin Mary is painted on a throne with baby Jesus Christ. In the church, there is one of the four images of the Ecumenical Council which took place in Bulgarian lands, as well as a valuable painting of the Last Supper of 1864.

The monastery buildings have two floors. On the first floor there are the stables and livestock premises and on the second are situated the monks' cells. The monastery complex has two separate yards and two residential wings.
