= Gabra, Sofia Province =

Gabra
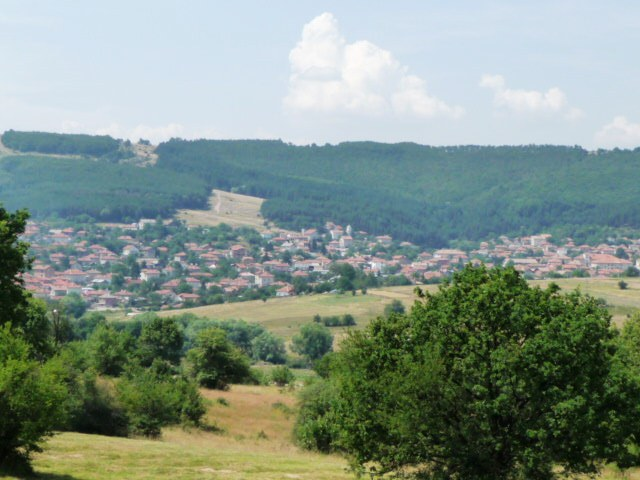

- Location of Gabra
- Coordinates: 42°32′N 23°37′E
- Country: Габра
- Provinces (Oblast): Sofia

Government
  - Mayor: Andrey Penchev
- Elevation: 892 m (2,927 ft)

Population (13.09.2005)
  - Total: 1,102
- Time zone: UTC+2 (EET)
  - Summer (DST): UTC+3 (EEST)
- Postal Code: 2112
- Area code: 071506

Gabra (Bulgarian: Габра), is a village in Western Bulgaria, part of Elin Pelin Municipality, Sofia Province. The village is located in the valley between the mountains Sredna Gora and Lozenska Planina. There is а church, a primary school and chitalishte. Near-by the village there is a small orthodox monastery called Saint Demetrius (Bulgarian: Свети Димитър, romanized: Sveti Dimitar). The original name of the village is Chukurovo (Bulgarian: Чукурово). Since 1934, it is changed to Gabra.

== History ==
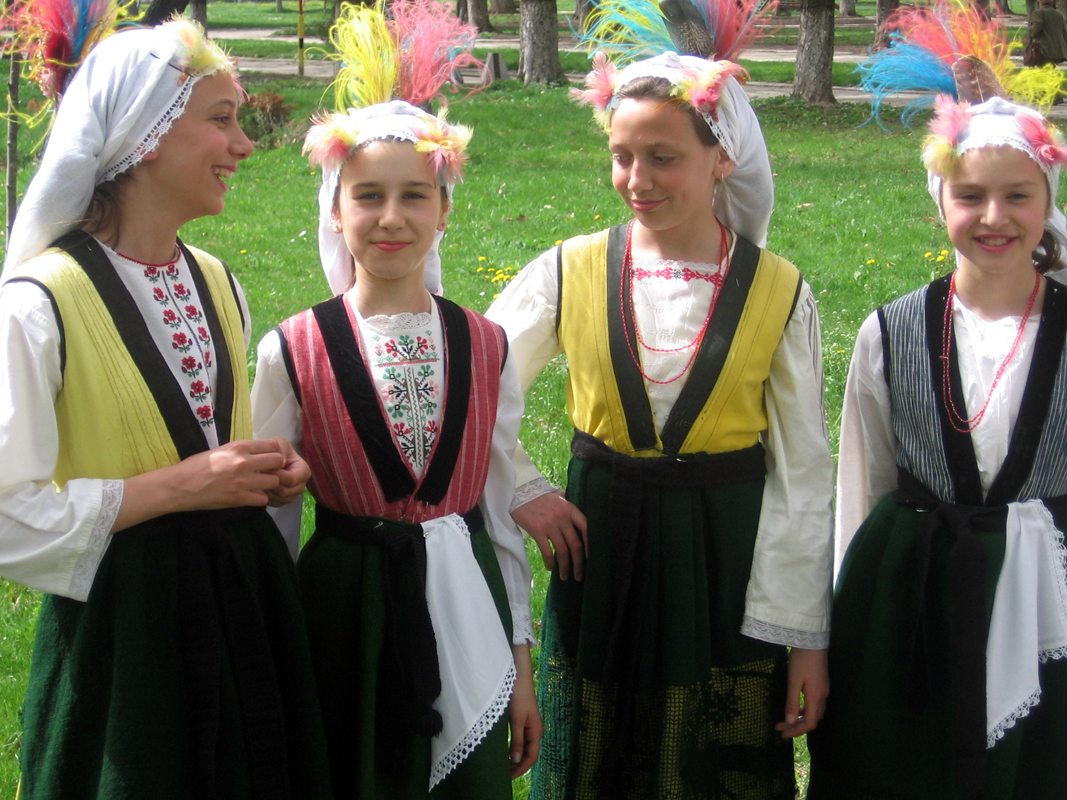
Lazarki from Gabra

For the first time Gabra is mentioned in an Ottoman record of celepkeşan's (livestock traders) in November 1576. The document is a detailed inventory of celepkeşan in 13 kazas, including Sofia. The document is stored in the SS. Cyril and Methodius National Library.

The first known buildings are in the area of Srabenitsa and had a 1.5 meters high wall covered with trees – something like sheepfold with a fireplace in the middle. The settlement was recognized by the Ottoman government and was named Chukurova (Chukurovo) from Turkish: çukur means hole, valley. Livelihood of the people of that time was farming and later production of charcoal.

Settlers of Srabenitsa moved into the area of Dahchanets where there was better drinking water. There they built better houses. They placed a wooden cross near the village and named the place of St Spas because of their salvation. At that time they began to celebrate Ascension of Jesus (Spasovden) which is the official holiday of the village of Gabra.

On 25 December 1877, Chukurovo was released from Ottoman rule. Later the border between the Principality of Bulgaria and Eastern Rumelia lied close to the village.

== Gabra Monastery ==
The Monastery St Demetrius or St. Mitar, as locals call it, is located only 2 km southeast of the village of Gabra. In 1865 Gabra villagers gave their savings and sent their fellow-villager Ivan Chakarov to Istanbul to ask permission from the Ottoman government to build a monastery. After heavy four months of travel on foot, with shepherds from Panagyurishte, he returned to favor in Istanbul. In 1866 Gabra Monastery was erected at the site of an old chapel of St. Marina (according to some sources of St. Mina) and was called to St. Demetrius. Church is painted by icon-painter Kostantin Gerov-Kostakiya and his students which can be found in Donor's inscription at the main entrance of the temple.

The monastery had a separate building for housing, another for hoteling guests and magernitsa. There was a 500 ha forest, about 100 ha of fields and meadows, 50–60 cattle and more than 100 sheep. Today only the church of the monastery and the foundations of magernitsa, recently destroyed during the communist regime are preserved.

== See also ==
- Sofia Province
