= Novi Han =

Novi Han Нови хан
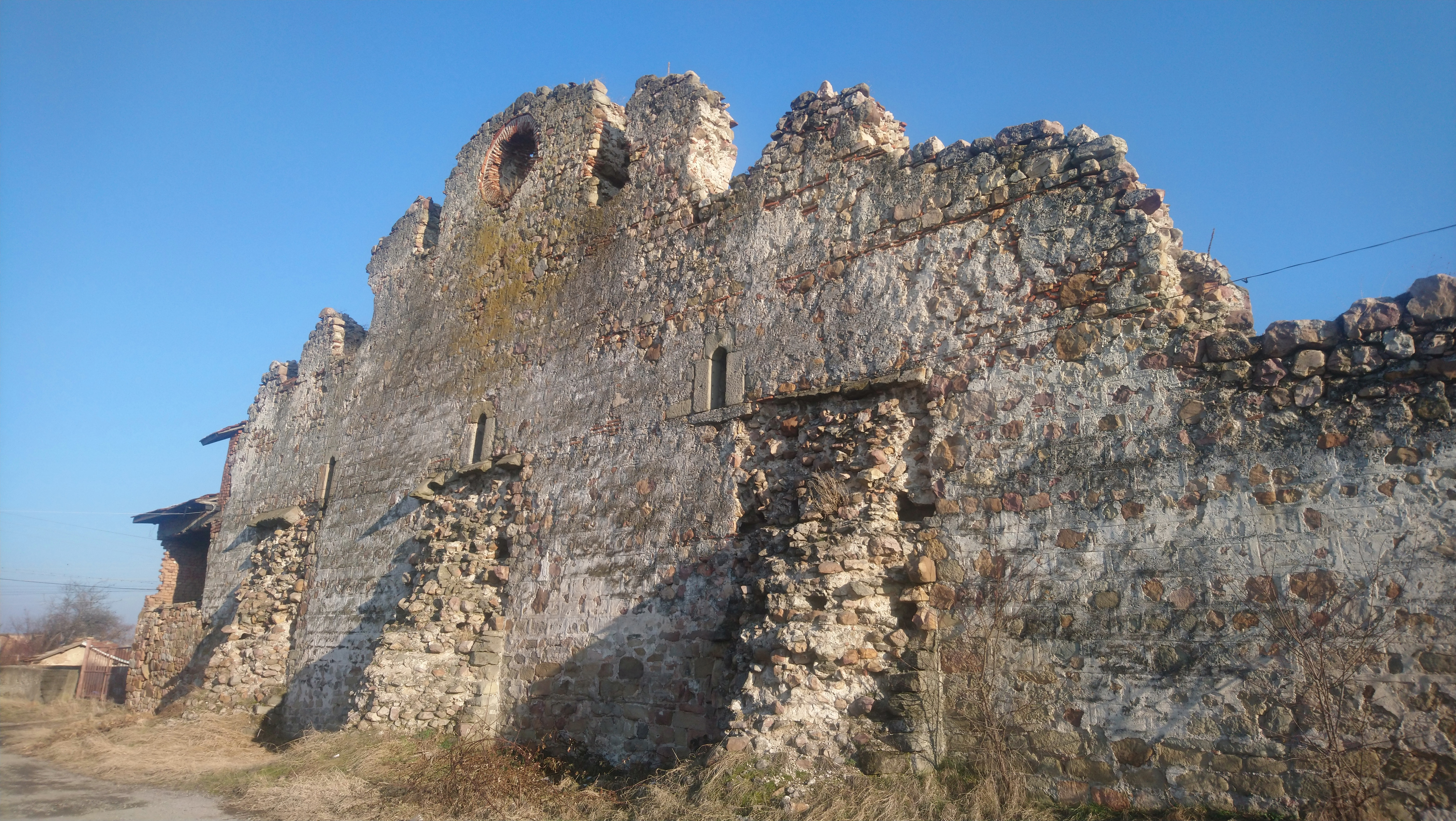
- The ruins of the 17th-century caravanserai

- Location of Novi Han, Bulgaria
- Coordinates: 42°36′20.16″N 23°35′33.49″E
- Country: Bulgaria
- Provinces (Oblast): Sofia Province

Government
  - Mayor: Aleksandar Stoichkov
- Elevation: 631 m (2,070 ft)

Population (15.09.2022)
  - Total: 3,205
- Time zone: UTC+2 (EET)
  - Summer (DST): UTC+3 (EEST)
- Postal Code: 2110
- Area codes: 071501 from Bulgaria, 0035971501 from outside

Novi Han (Bulgarian: Нови хан) is a village in western Bulgaria. It has a population of 3,205 as of 2022.

== Geography ==
Novi Han is located in Sofia Province and has a territory of 47.558 km^{2}. It is part of Elin Pelin Municipality. The village lies 24 km east of the national capital Sofia, just north of the Trakia motorway. The municipal center Elin Pelin is at 10 km in northern direction. It is along the first class I-8 road Kalotina–Sofia–Plovdiv–Kapitan Andreevo.

Novi Han is situated in the Sofia Valley at the northern foothills of the Sredna Gora mountain range.

== History ==
The village is situated on the strategic Roman road Via Militaris that connected Central Europe and Constantinople. There are remains of Thracian, Roman, and medieval Bulgarian settlements in its vicinity. In 1670 on the place where the current village is located was constructed and Ottoman caravanserai as a major stop along the road, at one day march from Sofia.

During World War II part of the equipment of Radio Sofia was evacuated in Novi Han. The 1944 Bulgarian coup d'état by the communists was publicly announced from the village.

== Economy ==
Since 2008, the Bulgarian television network ⠀⠀NOVA⠀⠀ studios have been located in Novi Han. Some of its productions are filmed there, including the reality show Big Brother.

Some 7 km from the village a repository for radioactive waste is situated, constructed in the late 1950s and early 1960s to store waste from the activities of the Bulgarian Academy of Sciences experimental nuclear reactor. Until 2006, it was managed by the Institute for Nuclear Research and Nuclear Energy at the BAS. In 2006, the repository was reconstructed to meet modern requirements and was administratively transferred to the State Enterprise “Radioactive waste”. The control over the activity of the facility is carried out both by the enterprise and by the state control bodies — the Agency for Nuclear Regulation, the Ministry of Health and the Ministry of Environment and Water.
