= List of dams and reservoirs in Bulgaria =

This is a list of reservoirs in Bulgaria:

Note: In Bulgaria, a dam (Bulgarian язовир) is often used to refer the body of water, rather than the structure. It signifies that the body of water is man-made instead of natural.

Image	Reservoir	Area (km^{2})	Volume (m^{3})	Province
	Batak	21.07	310,000,000	Pazardzhik Province
	Beli Iskar	0.85	15,300,000	Sofia Province
	Belmeken	4.5	144,000,000	Pazardzhik Province
	Bryagovo			Plovdiv Province
	Dospat	22	448,220,000	Pazardzhik Province, Smolyan Province
	Dushantsi		13,000,000	Sofia Province
	Golyam Beglik	4.1	62,100,000	Pazardzhik Province
	Iskar	30	673,000,000	Sofia City
	Ivaylovgrad	15.0	188,000,000	Kardzhali Province
	Kamchia	9.6	233,550,000	Burgas Province
	Kardzhali	16.07	497,200,000	Kardzhali Province
	Koprinka	11.2	140,000,000	Stara Zagora Province
	Malko Sharkovo		55,000,000	Yambol Province
	Mandra	38.84		Burgas Province
	Ognyanovo		32,000,000	Sofia City
	Ogosta	23.6	506,000,000	Montana Province
	Pasarel Reservoir			Sofia City
	Pchelina			Pernik Province
	Pyasachnik	9.1	103,000,000	Plovdiv Province
	Shiroka Polyana	4.0	24,000,000	Pazardzhik Province
	Studena			Pernik Province
	Studen Kladenets	25.6	489,000,000	Kardzhali Province
	Ticha	18.7	311,000,000	Shumen Province
	Topolnitsa	4.1	137,000,000	Pazardzhik Province, Sofia Province
	Tsonevo	23.9	185,000,000	Varna Province
	Vacha	4.97	226,120,000	Smolyan Province
	Yovkovtsi	25.6	92,179,000	Veliko Tarnovo Province
	Zhrebchevo	22.4	400,000,000	Sliven Province, Stara Zagora Province

== See also ==
- List of lakes in Bulgaria
- List of rivers of Bulgaria
- List of dams and reservoirs
