= Beli Iskar Reservoir =

Reservoir in Sofia Provinces, Bulgaria

Beli Iskar Dam
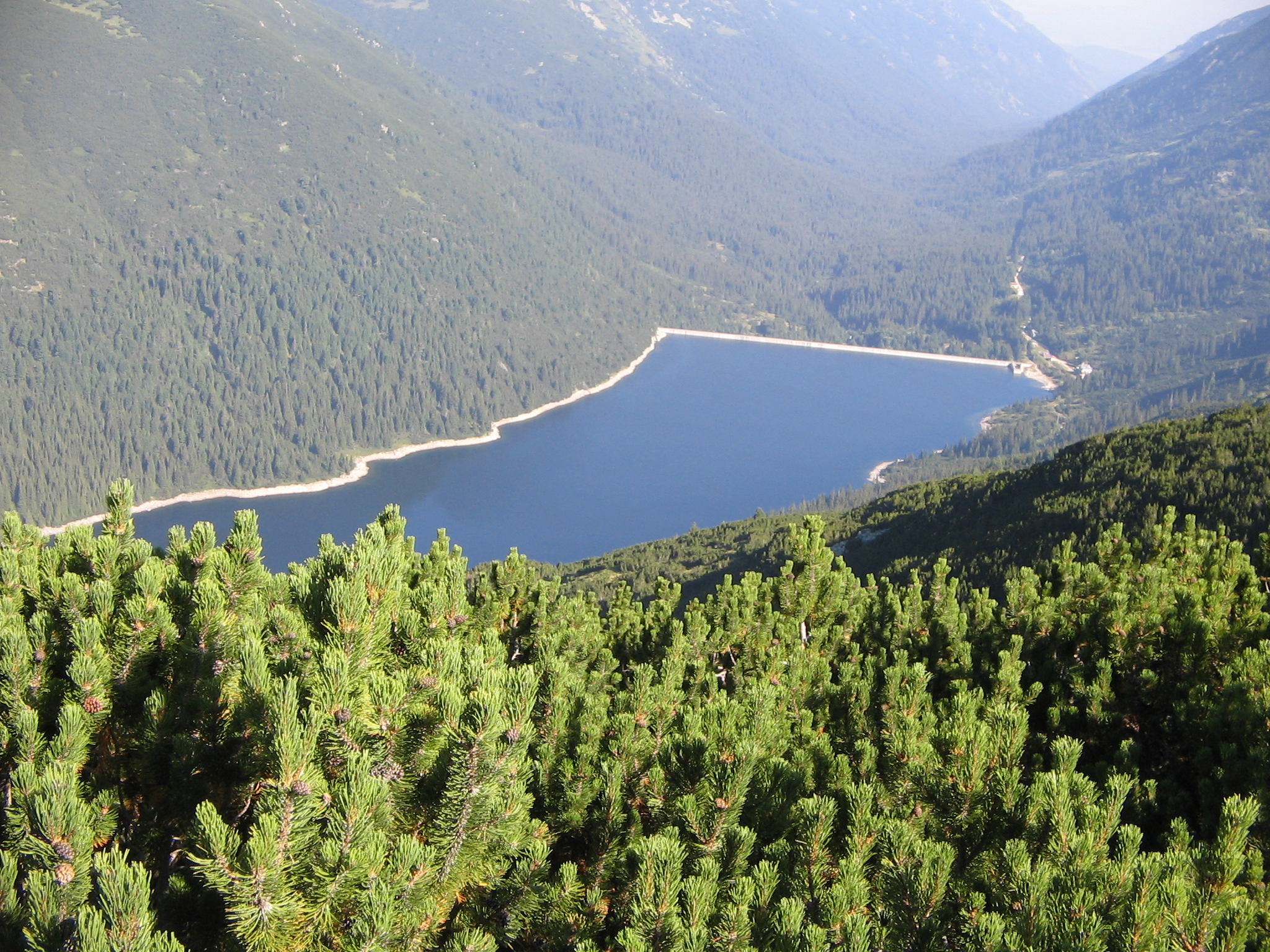

- Location of Beli Iskar in Bulgaria
- Interactive map of Beli Iskar Dam
- Official name: Язовир Бели Искър (Bulgarian)
- Location: Rila
- Coordinates: 42°7′59.99″N 23°34′0.01″E
- Construction began: 1935
- Opening date: 1945

Dam and spillways
- Height: 51 m (167 ft)

Reservoir
- Creates: Beli Iskar Reservoir
- Total capacity: 15,080,000 m^{3} (12,230 acre⋅ft)
- Surface area: 0.85 km^{2} (210 acres)

Power Station
- Installed capacity: 16.8 MW
- Annual generation: 26.7 GWh

Beli Iskar Reservoir (Bulgarian: Язовир Бели Искър) is a small dam and reservoir in western Bulgaria, situated near the southern foothills of the Balkans' highest summit Musala (2,925 m) in the Rila mountain range. It is built on the homonymous river, one of the two main stems of the Iskar. Administratively, the reservoir is located in the territory of the village of Beli Iskar in Samokov Municipality of Sofia Province. Lying some 75 km south of the national capital Sofia, the reservoir provides about 20% of the city's potable water supply, serving as a complementary volume to the main water source, the Iskar Reservoir. It is among the highest altitude reservoirs in Europe and is among the oldest ones in Bulgaria, constructed between 1935 and 1945.

== Description ==
Beli Iskar Reservoir has an area of 0.85 km^{2} and a volume of 15 million m^{3}. Its length is 2.8 km and the width varies between 500 and 600 m. The catchment area of the river Beli Iskar is 28.1 km^{2}, but it increases to 42.5 km^{2} by the bringing of the waters of the Pryaka Reka (directly) and the tributaries Darkovo Dere, Shopalata and Lyuti Dol through the pressure tunnel of the Beli Iskar Hydro Power Plant. The purpose of the reservoir is to collect the surface waters in the catchment area, mainly from the melting of the snows in the period April–July and from the autumn rains, and to compensate for the low water in summer and winter.

The dam is a concrete gravity one with a height of 50.70 m, crest length of 522.5 m and crest elevation of 1878 m. Is volume is 216,000 m^{3} of concrete and 10,000 m^{3} of masonry. To prevent decay due to the frequent freezing and thawing of the water, the dam wall is reinforced with 60 cm granite lining.

In the dam wall is located the small Beli Iskar Hydro Power Plant with installed capacity of 16.8 MW, powered with two Pelton turbines. On average the power plant produces 26.7 GWh annually. It is owned by the National Electricity Company.

== Gallery ==
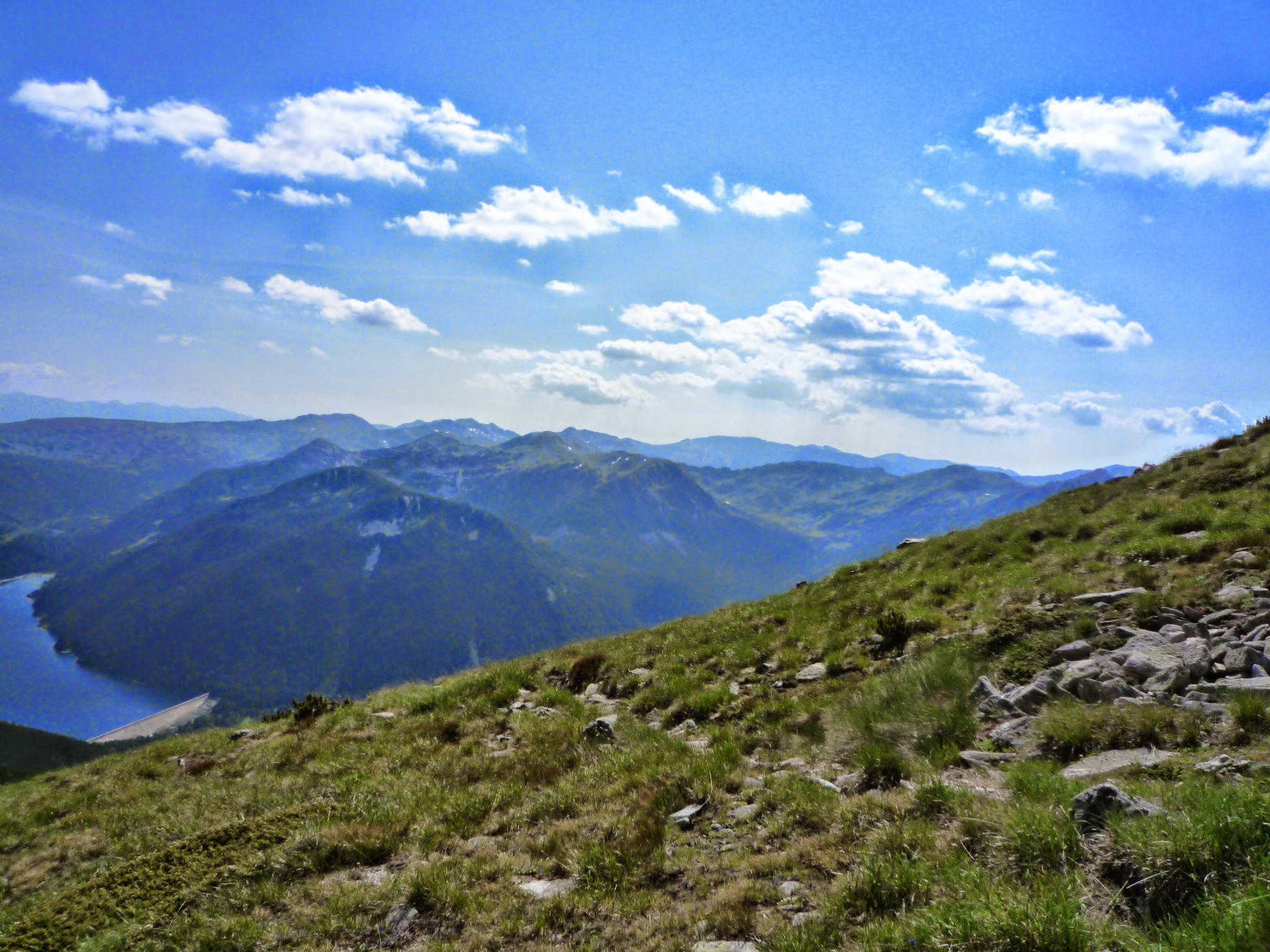

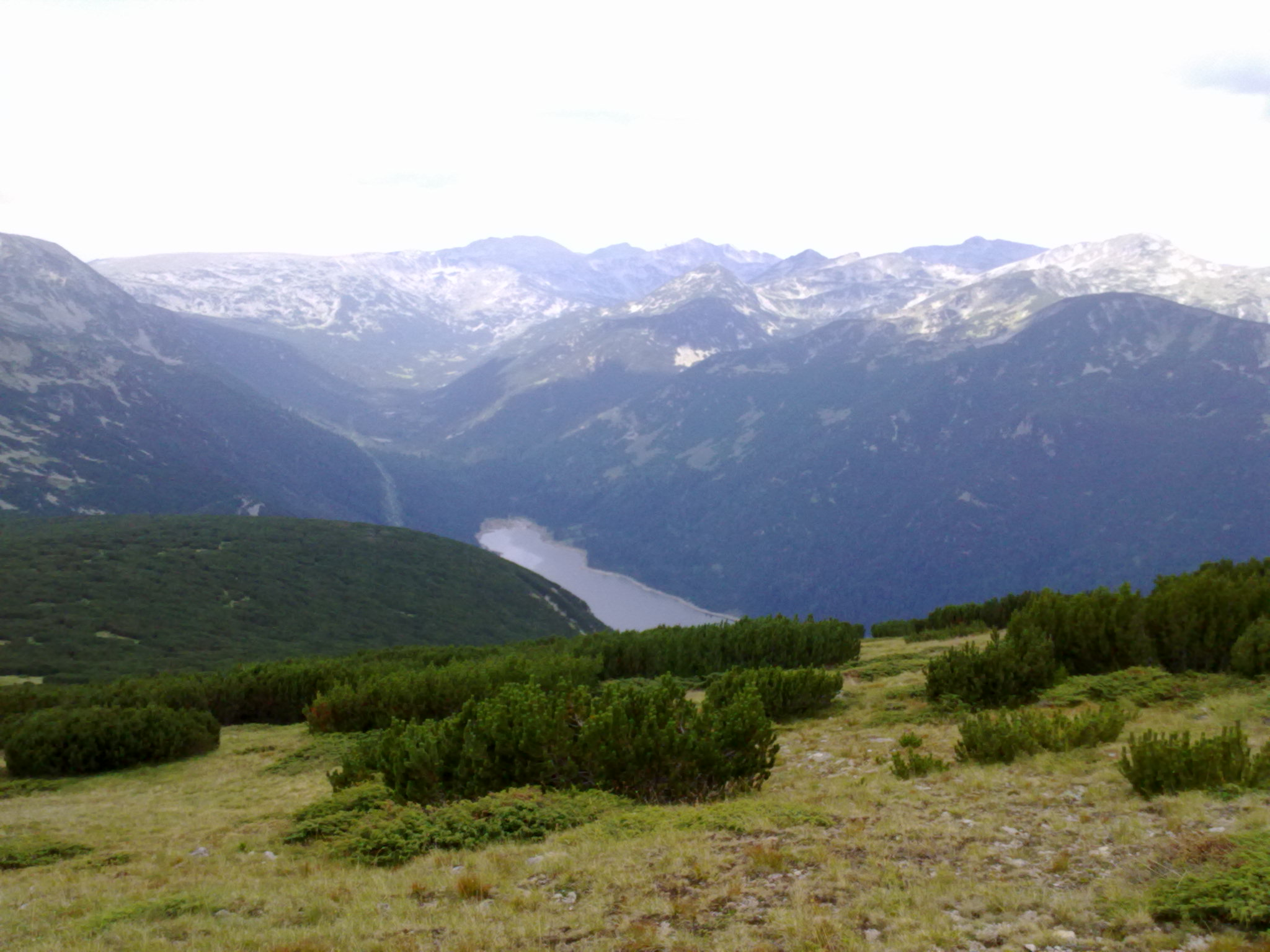

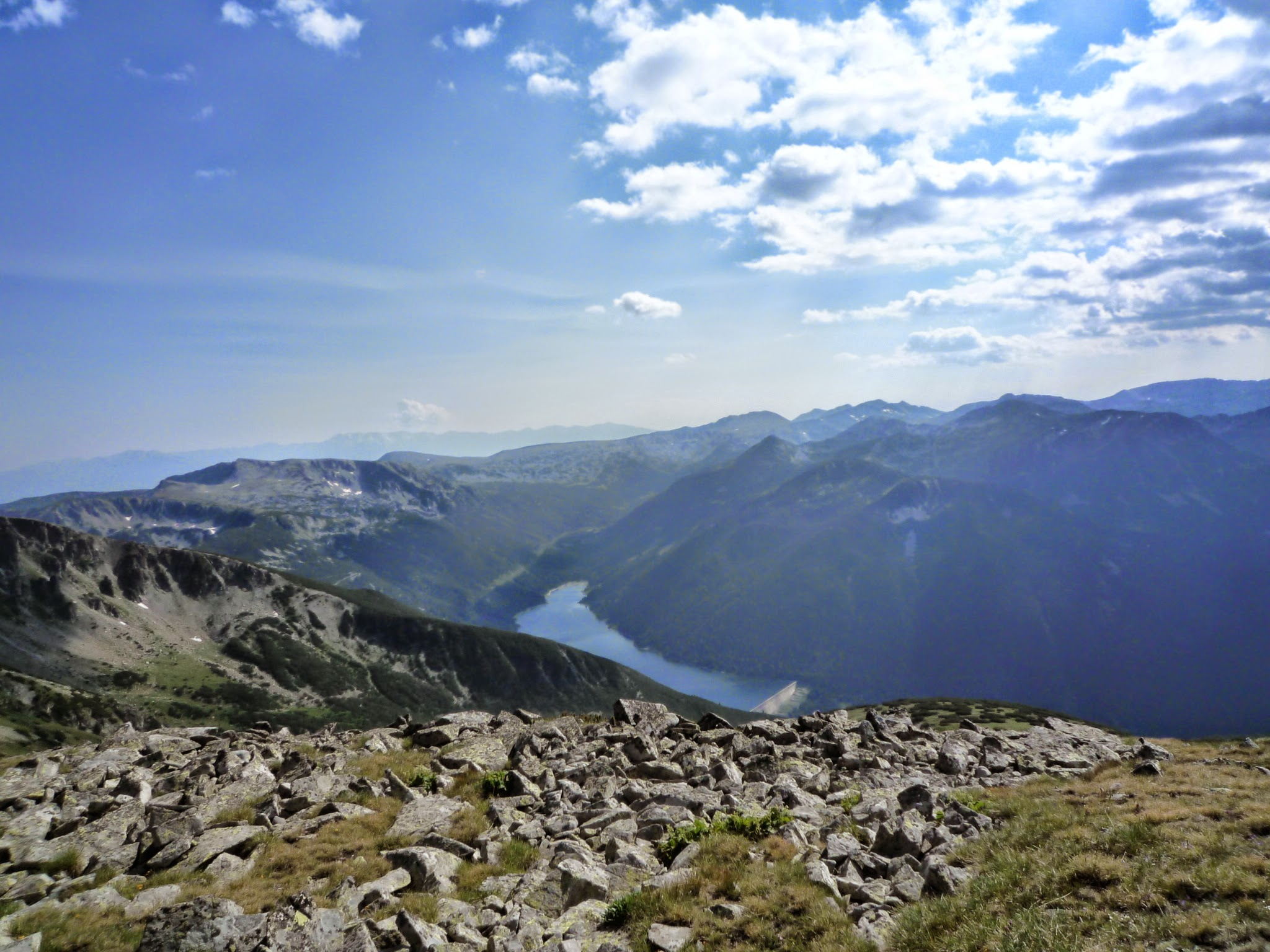
