= Elin Pelin =

Bulgarian writer (1877–1949)

- Елин Пелин
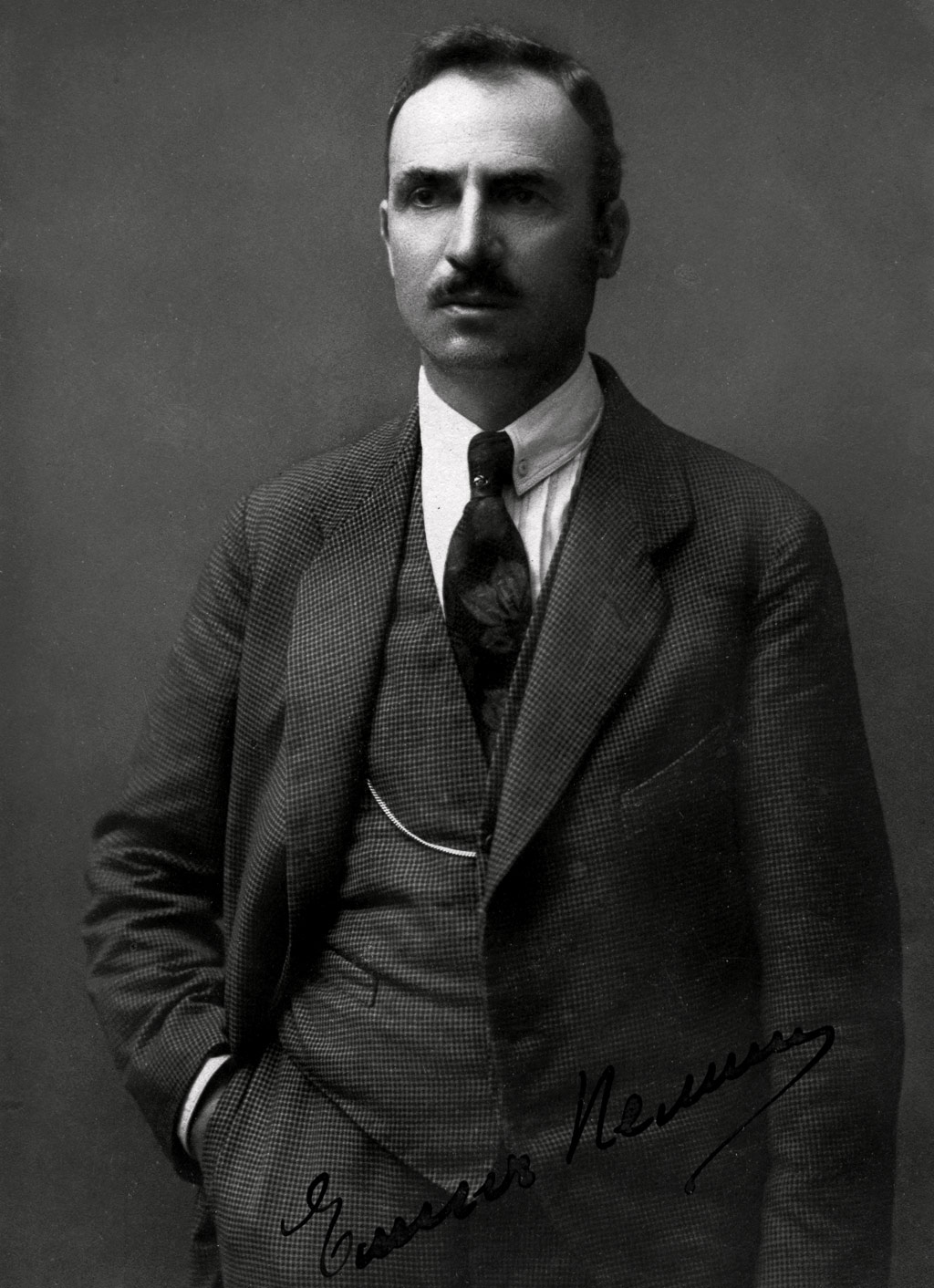
- Born: Dimitar Ivanov Stoyanov; 8 July 1877; Bailovo, Ottoman Empire (now Bulgaria)
- Died: 3 December 1949 (aged 72); Sofia, Bulgaria
- Resting place: Central Sofia Cemetery
- Children: 2
- Writing career
- Genres: story, impression (short story), Balkan country poem, Bulgarian novel
- Subject: Bulgarian village life
- Notable works: "Fatherland's politeness" (1895), country poem

Elin Pelin (Bulgarian: Елин Пелин [ɛˈlin pɛˈlin]) (8 July 1877 – 3 December 1949), born Dimitar Ivanov Stoyanov (Димитър Иванов Стоянов) was a Bulgarian writer. Stoyan Christowe called him "Bulgaria's leading writer".

== Biography ==
He was born in the village of Bailovo, in Sofia District. He completed his primary education, but not his secondary education. Studying to become a teacher, he taught for a year in 1895 in his native village. He went to Sofia some time after that, and from 1898 to 1900 returned to live in Bailovo. He was first published in 1901, and the respect it earned him in literary circles encouraged him to go to Sofia in 1903, where he worked as a librarian at the Sofia University library and national library of Bulgaria from 1904. From 1922 he was a curator of the Ivan Vazov museum. His name was derived from a Bulgarian folksong. He spent 1904–05 in France, and made trips to Italy and Russia in 1906 and 1913. Most of his life was spent in Sofia.

Between 1910 and 1916, he was the director of special collections at the National Library and also served as editor of numerous magazines, including the children's publication Veselushka. Additionally, he served as a war correspondent during World War I.

In 1911, one of his most famous Bulgarian literary works appeared, The Gerak Family (Bulgarian: Geratsite). It is one of the best-known pieces of Bulgarian literature and critically deals with the Bulgarian traditional village family experiencing the transition from the simplicity of rurality to the modernization of Bulgarian society, a social world in which old country traditional practices founded on family love and dedication to the country land start to disappear. His second great work in the Bulgarian literary canon, Earth (Bulgarian: Zemya), was published in 1922. In this book, Pelin created a memorable gallery of characters which may be identified with the Bulgarian national character and Balkan consciousness.

Pelin's literary works—poems, short stories and novels—allowed for a recreation of the countryside atmosphere in post-liberation Bulgaria. His predilection for short stories led him to write many, of which Pizho and Penda is the best known. His works are known for country realism and descriptions full of light and color. Considered one of the masters of Bulgarian prose, he was also one of the initiators of Bulgarian children's literature. His children's tales of Yan Bibiyan and his voyages to the moon are still widely read today.

Pelin published the first book of fairytales in verse in Bulgarian; many of his works were written for children. In 1940, he was named president of the Union of Bulgarian Writers.

After the War, he managed to escape being blacklisted as a forbidden author by the Communist government of the People's Republic of Bulgaria. The regime chose to consider his works as those of a realistic, critical author, а precursor of Socialist Realism who, although not having correctly seized the true nature of the Bourgeois state, knew how to tell about the life of the working class and individual revolt of exploited peasants.

Earth and The Gerak Family, amongst other works, have been filmed several times (1930 and 1957, and 1958, respectively).

In 1949, he was presented with the gold medal for science and art. Georgi Karaslavov described him as second only to Botev in Bulgarian literature.

The Bulgarian town of Elin Pelin was named after him, as is Elin Pelin Point on Smith Island, South Shetland Islands.
