= Bailovo =

Coordinates: 42°39′N 23°49′E

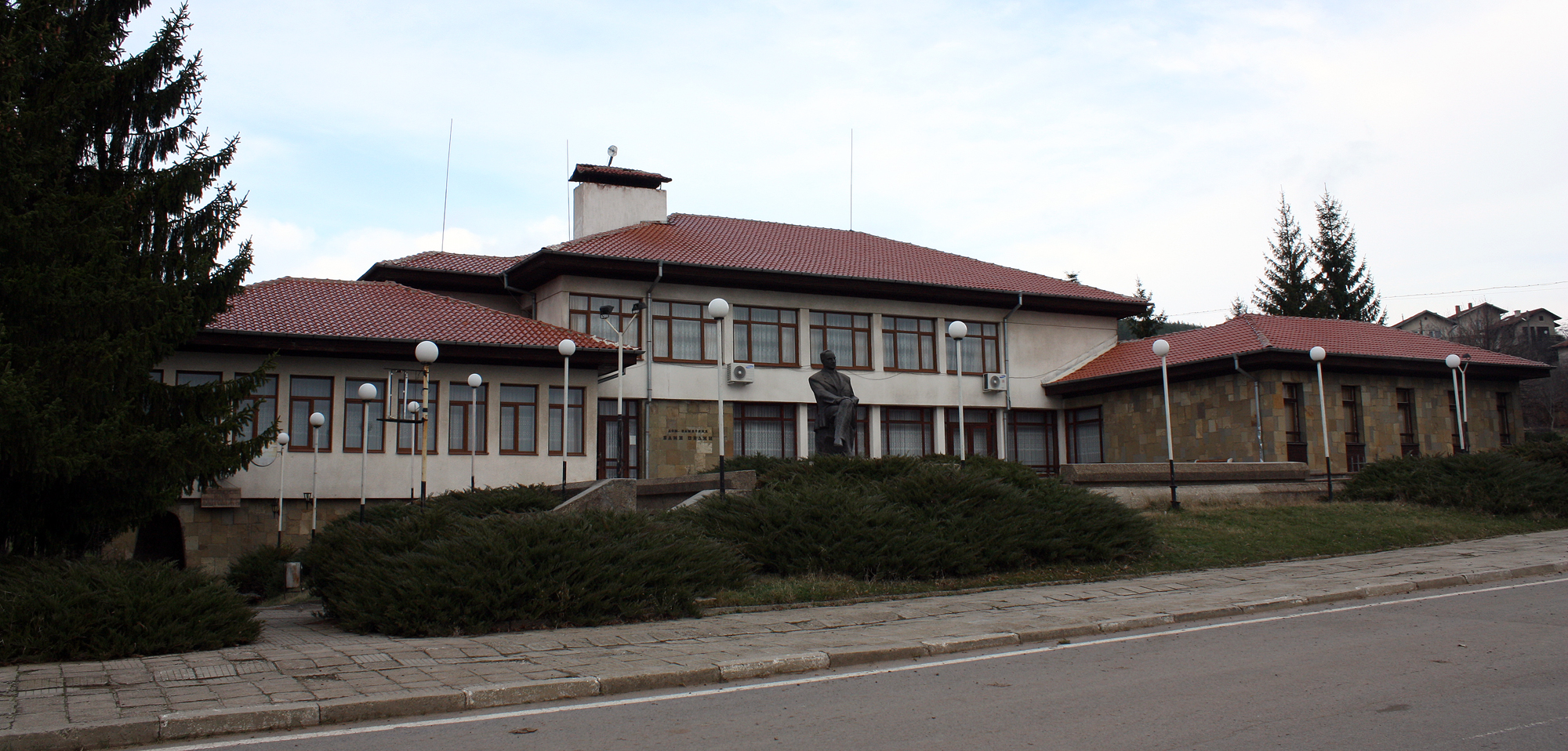
Center of Bailovo with library and museum buildings, and monument of Elin Pelin

Bailovo (Cyrillic: Байлово) is a village in Western Bulgaria, 43 km east of Sofia, Bulgaria. It is the home village of the Bulgarian writer Elin Pelin (born as Dimitar Ivanov Stoyanov), and ascetic Dobri Dobrev.

== Climate ==
The climate of Bailovo village is characterized by late spring, cool summer, warm and mild autumn and short winter (average 2–3 months). Most rainfalls fall in late May and June, least at the end of July and August. Autumn and winter winds are called "Sofia citizen" and "Zagorets", coming from the west and northwest.
