= Elin Pelin (town) =

Elin Pelin Елин Пелин
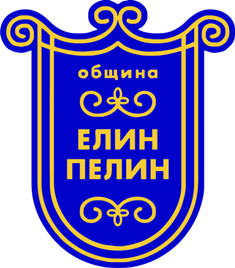
- Coat of arms

- Location of Elin Pelin
- Coordinates: 42°40′N 23°36′E
- Country: Bulgaria
- Provinces (Oblast): Sofia Province
- Elevation: 558 m (1,831 ft)

Population (2005-09-13)
  - Total: 7,263
- Time zone: UTC+2 (EET)
  - Summer (DST): UTC+3 (EEST)
- Postal Code: 2100
- Area code: 0725
- License plate: CO

Elin Pelin (Bulgarian: Елин Пелин [ɛˈlin pɛˈlin]), previously known as Novoseltsi (Новоселци), is a town in central western Bulgaria. It is the administrative centre of Elin Pelin Municipality, located in central Sofia Province. It lies in the Sofia Valley, with the slopes of the Balkan Mountains to the north and Sredna Gora to the south-southeast, 24 km southeast of the capital city of Sofia.

The number of Thracian, Roman, and Byzantine artifacts and ruins in the area proves that the surroundings of Elin Pelin have been inhabited since antiquity. A Slavic settlement was founded in the Middle Ages and existed until the early Ottoman rule of Bulgaria.

Elin Pelin (then Novoseltsi) began to emerge as a local cultural and trade centre during the Bulgarian National Revival. In 1881, after the Liberation of Bulgaria, it was proclaimed the administrative centre of a district. Novoseltsi continued to grow in importance after the construction of the Sofia–Saranbey (now Septemvri) railway line and the establishment of the Izida ceramic factory, the first in the country. A class school and a chitalishte were founded in the late 19th century. Novoseltsi was renamed Elin Pelin in honour of the noted writer of the same name (born in the nearby village of Bailovo) in 1950 and was proclaimed a town in 1960.

The area of Elin Pelin is one of the best preserved centres of the traditional ethnocultural subgroup of the Bulgarian people, the Shopi, including its characteristic vernacular, the white clothing and the characteristic dances, songs and humour. The Shop Holidays, a celebration of Shop culture and life, have been organized in the town since 1970.

== Gallery ==
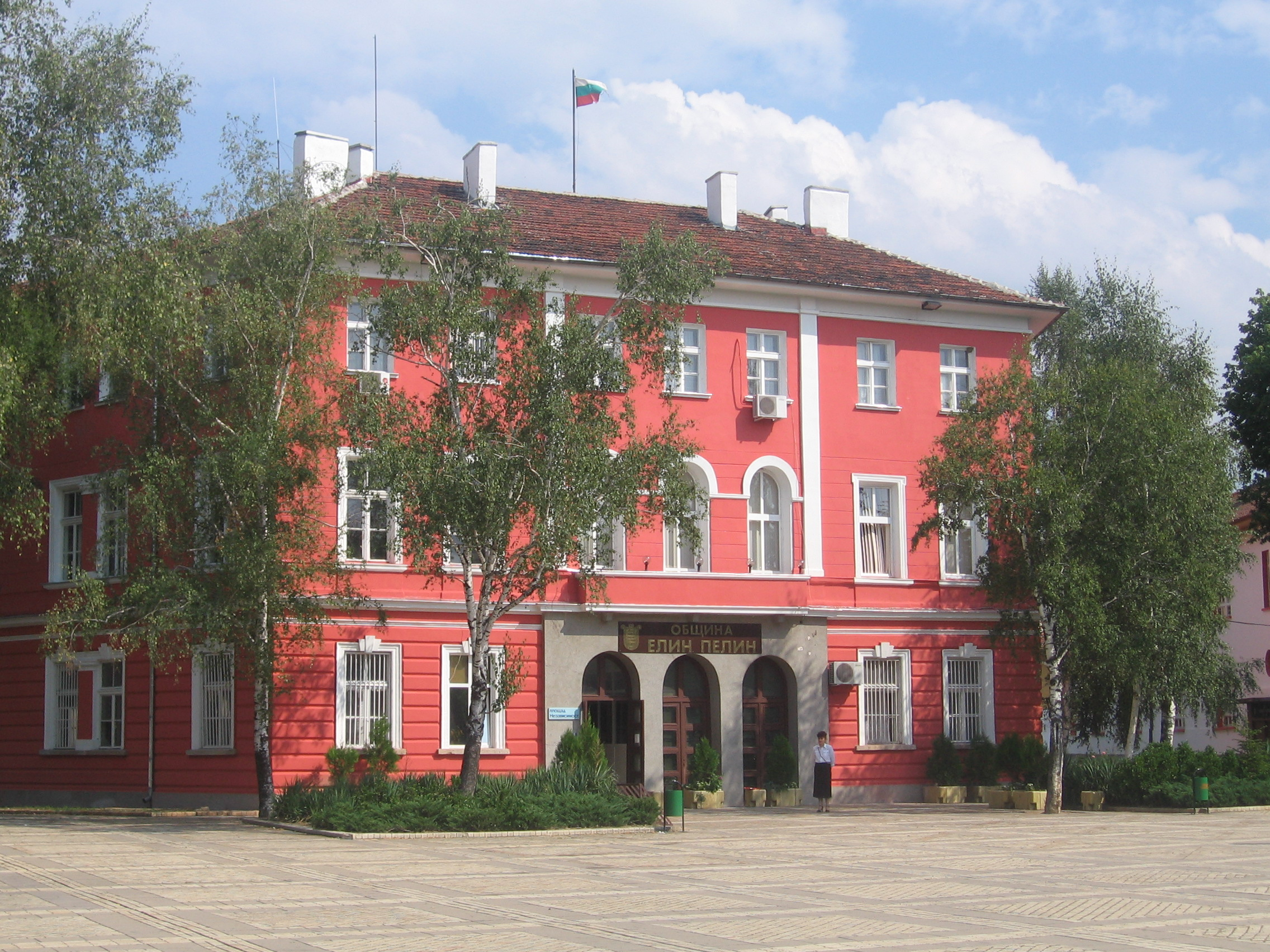
Elin Pelin municipality building

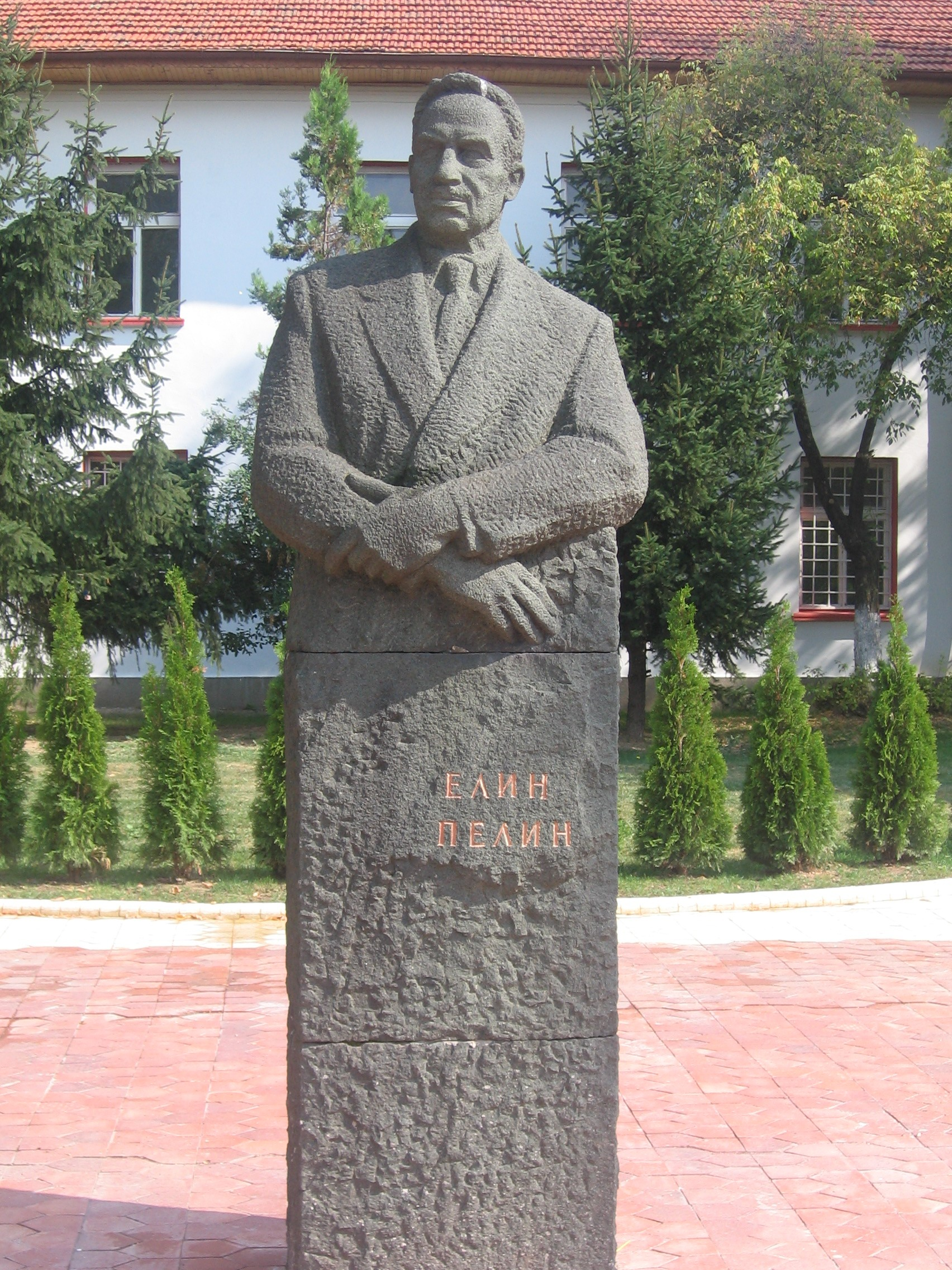
Monument to Elin Pelin

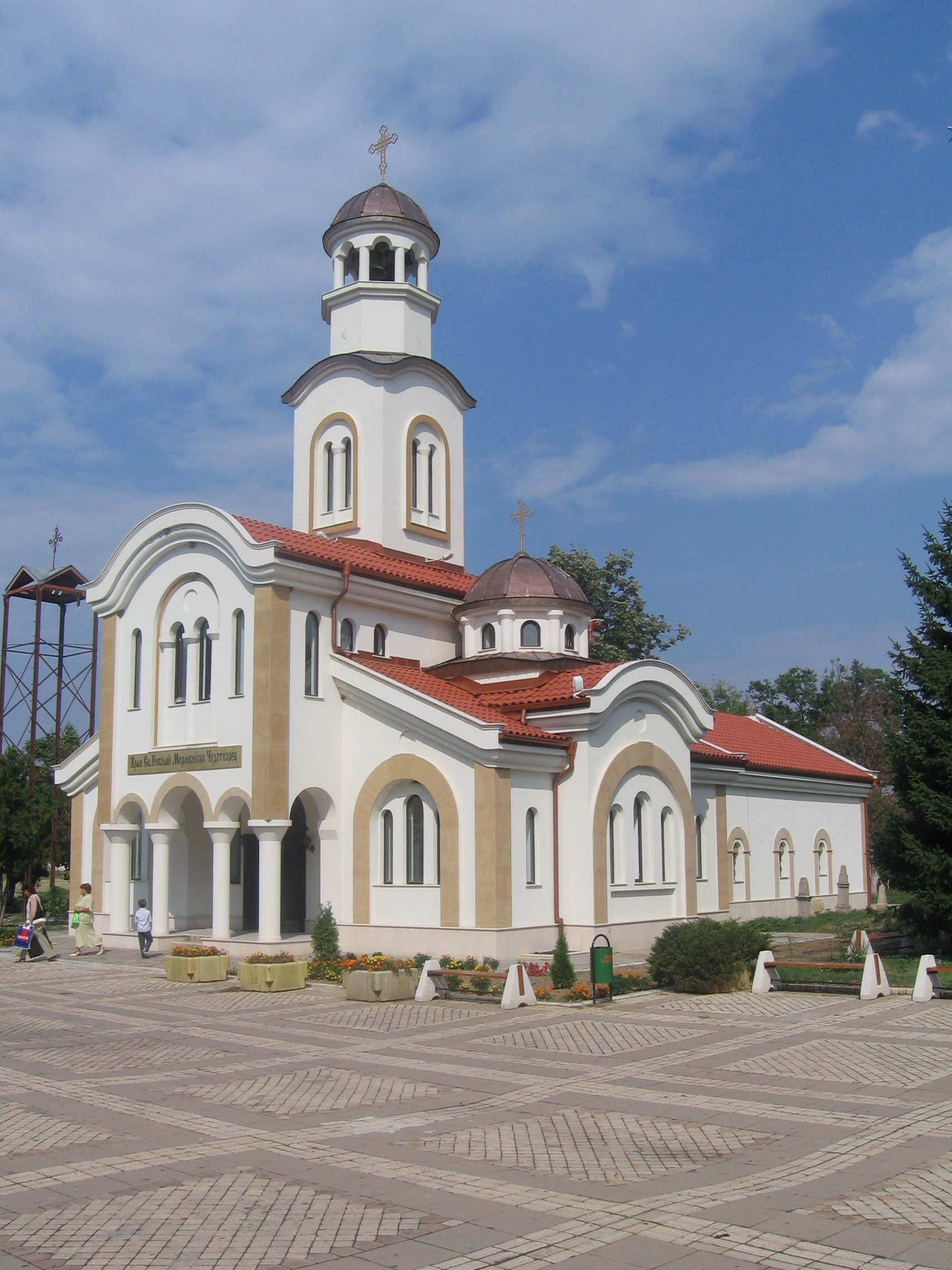
The renovated and expanded Church of St Nicholas the Miracle Worker (1846)

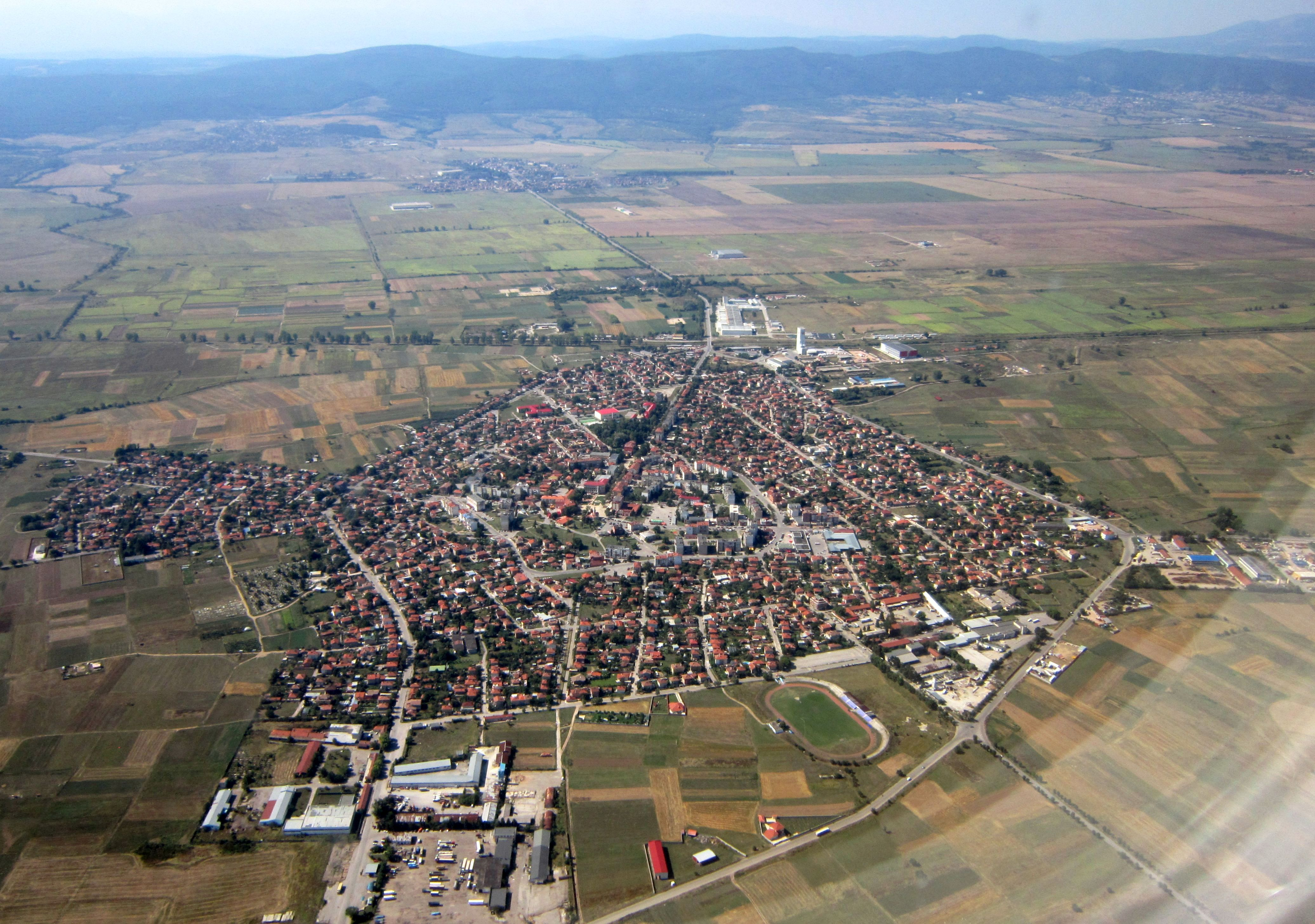
Aerial view
