= Yan Bibiyan =

Bulgarian children's fantasy novel

Yan Bibiyan (Bulgarian: Ян Бибиян) is the first Bulgarian fantasy novel for children by the Bulgarian writer Elin Pelin and the name of its protagonist. The novel is described as " the most celebrated children’s fantasy novel". Today there is almost nobody in Bulgaria who has not read it as a child, and it is part of the recommended literature for the fourth grade curriculum.

The novel consists of two parts: "Ян Бибиян. Невероятни приключения на едно хлапе" ("Yan Bibiyan. The Amazing Adventures of a Boy", 1933) и "Ян Бибиян на Луната" ("Yan Bibiyan on the Moon", 1934).

In the first part Yan Bibiyan befriends a mischievous devilkin Fyut. Later Yan gets trapped in a kingdom of a Great Vizard Mirilaylay (Мирилайлай). The genre of this part may be described as a fairy tale or fantasy.

In the second part Yan Bibiyan gets to the Moon, and it is a classical science fiction, where Fyut appears only episodically.

In the preface to the second part the author gave the following summary of the first part:

Whoever you are, dear reader, I draw your attention to the fact that before reading this book, it is good to know who Yan Bibiyan is.

And you will learn about his life from the book Yan Bibiyan, which was published before this one and in which the wonderful adventures of this interesting boy are described. From it you will learn how Yan Bibiyan became friends with the little devil Fyut, how he replaced his head with a clay one, how he then fell into the magical kingdom of the great magician Mirilaylay and how after wonderful and brave adventures he was saved.

His sufferings and his struggle to free himself from evil ennobled his soul, hardened his will, made him brave and enterprising. So he got on the moon and was able to achieve the dream that for centuries has driven irreconcilable scientists with wild imagination.

An opera based on the novel was written. Libretto: Alla Gerova, music: Nayden Gerov. It premiered in the Ruse National Opera on May 14, 1969.

In 1985 a musical film based on the novel was produced.

In 2022 the Bulgarian National Film Center funded a new film to be directed by Javor Gardev based in the novel.
