= Ognyanovo Reservoir =

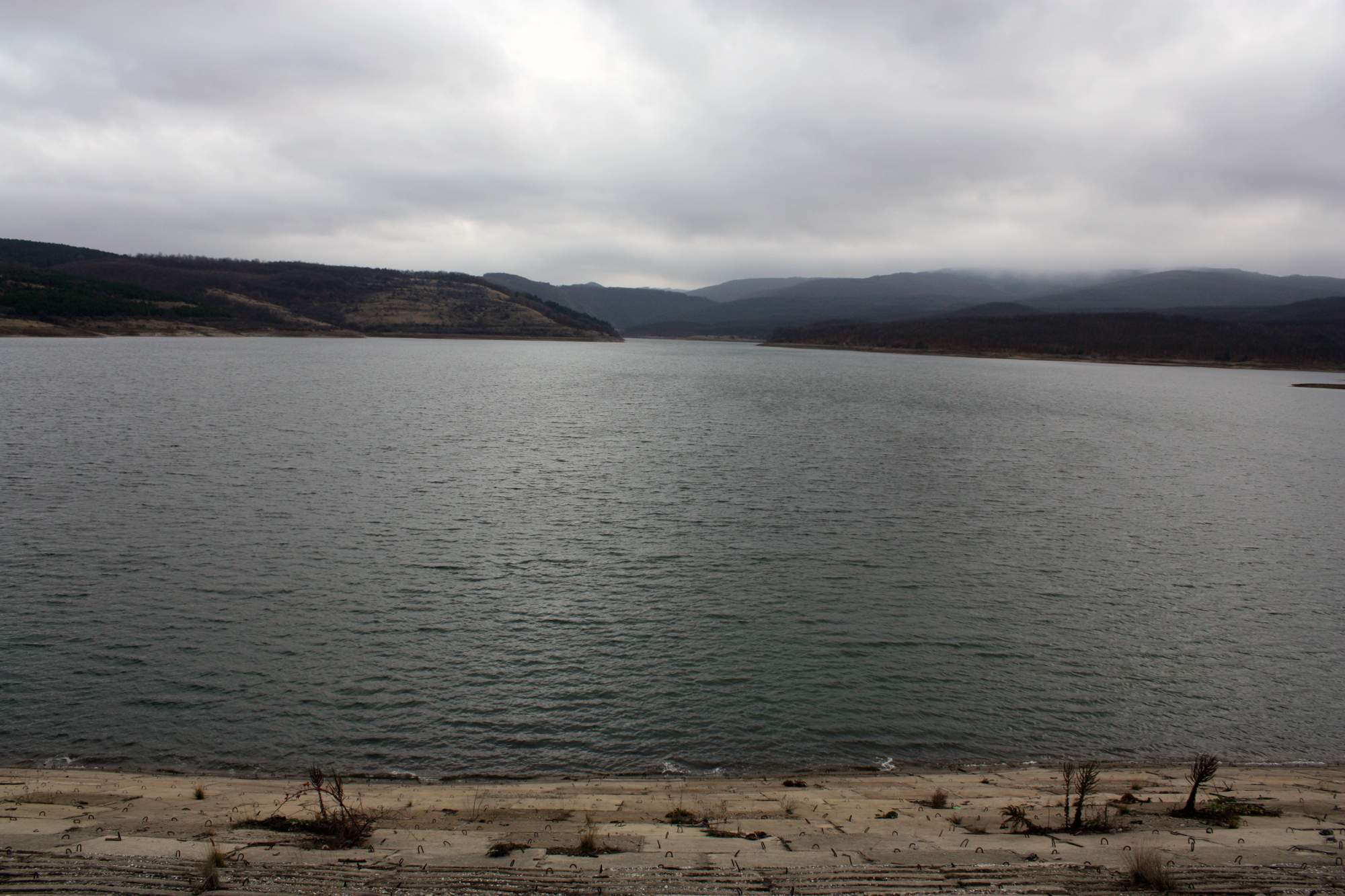
- Interactive map of Ognyanovo Reservoir
- Official name: Огняново
- Coordinates: 42.61°N 23.75°E

Ognyanovo reservoir, also called Lake Ognyanovo, or Ognyanova, is a reservoir in Bulgaria near Sofia. Holding 32 million cubic metres of water, it is an important reservoir in Bulgaria. It impounds the waters of the Lesnovska river.

On October 27, 2011, while filming The Expendables 2, stuntman Kun Liu was killed and another, Nuo Sun, critically injured in a staged explosion on a rubber boat. Sun underwent a five-hour operation, which left him in stable condition.
