= Vaskovo (disambiguation) =

Vaskovo is a village in Bulgaria.

Vaskovo may also refer to:

- Vaškovo, Village in Montenegro
- Vaskovo Airport, Russia
- Vaskovo, Sokolsky District, Vologda Oblast, village in Russia
- Vaskovo, Sheksninsky District, Vologda Oblast, village in Russia
- Vaskovo, Cherepovetsky District, Vologda Oblast, village in Russia
- Vaskovo, Primorsky District, Arkhangelsk Oblast, village in Russia
