= Lozen (disambiguation) =

Lozen was a 19th-century female warrior and prophet of the Apache Native Americans.

Lozen may also refer to the following places:

== Antarctica ==
- Mount Lozen, a mountain in Antarctica
- Lozen Nunatak, a hill on Livingston Island in Antarctica

== Bulgaria ==
- Lozen, Haskovo Province, a village in Lyubimets Municipality
- Lozen, Pazardzhik Province, a village in Septemvri Municipality
- Lozen, Sofia City Province, a village in Sofia Capital Municipality
  - Lozen Monastery, a monastery near Sofia, Bulgaria
  - Lozen Mountain
- Lozen, Stara Zagora Province, a village in Stara Zagora Municipality
- Lozen, Veliko Tarnovo Province, a village in Strazhitsa Municipality

== Other ==
- Lozen, Belgium, a hamlet near Bocholt, Belgium

== See also ==
- Losen (disambiguation)
