= Lyubimets (disambiguation) =

Lyubimets is a town in Bulgaria

Lyubimets may also refer to:

- FC Lyubimets
- Lyubimets 13 Bulgarian comedy film
- Lyubimets Municipality, Bulgaria
- Lyubimets Nunatak, nunatak in Antarctica
