= Malko Gradishte =

- Village
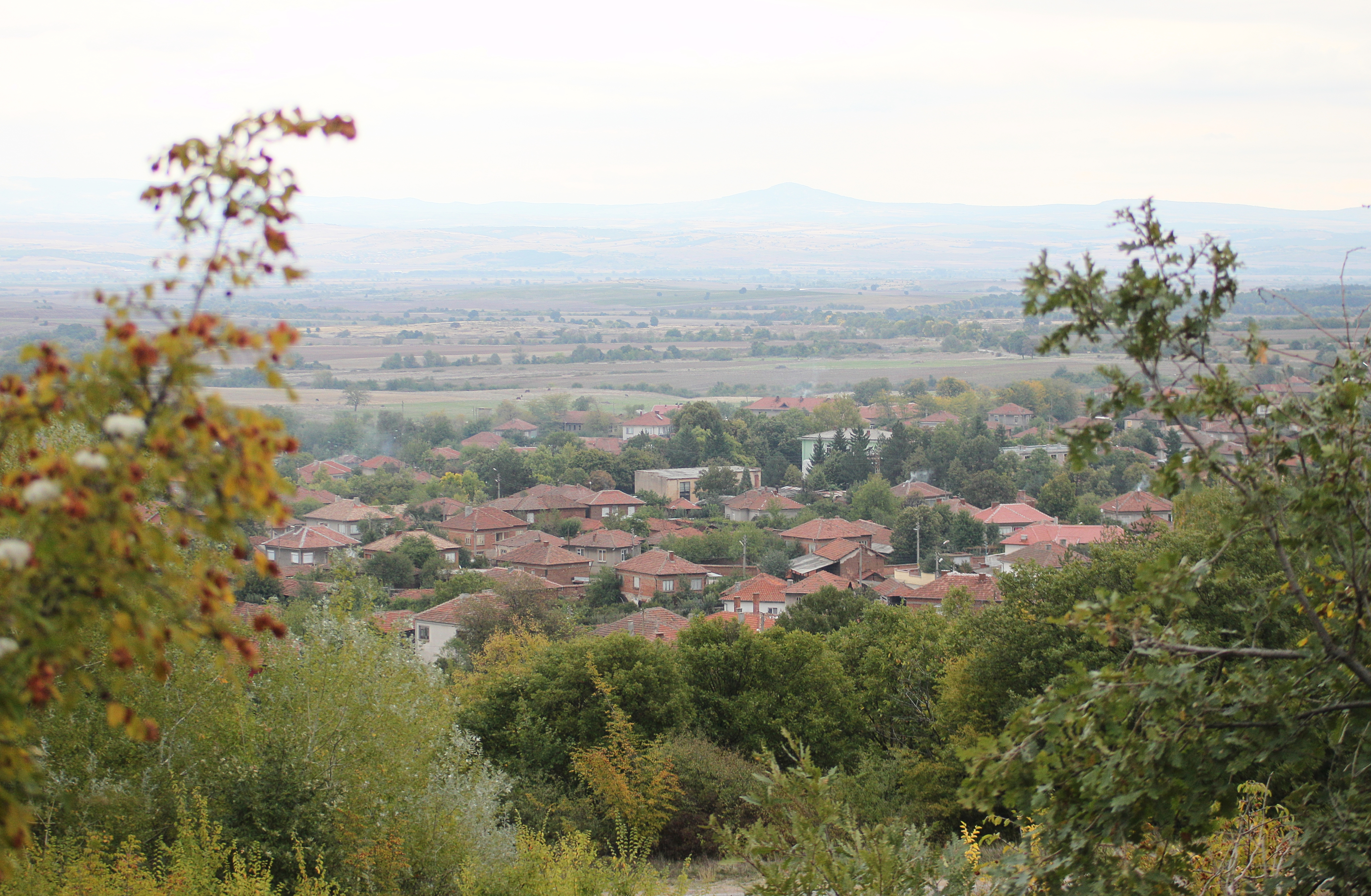
- Overlooking the village of Malko Gradishte

- Location within Bulgaria
- Coordinates: 41°46′N 26°00′E
- Country: Bulgaria
- Province: Haskovo Province
- Municipality: Lyubimets
- Time zone: UTC+2 (EET)
  - Summer (DST): UTC+3 (EEST)

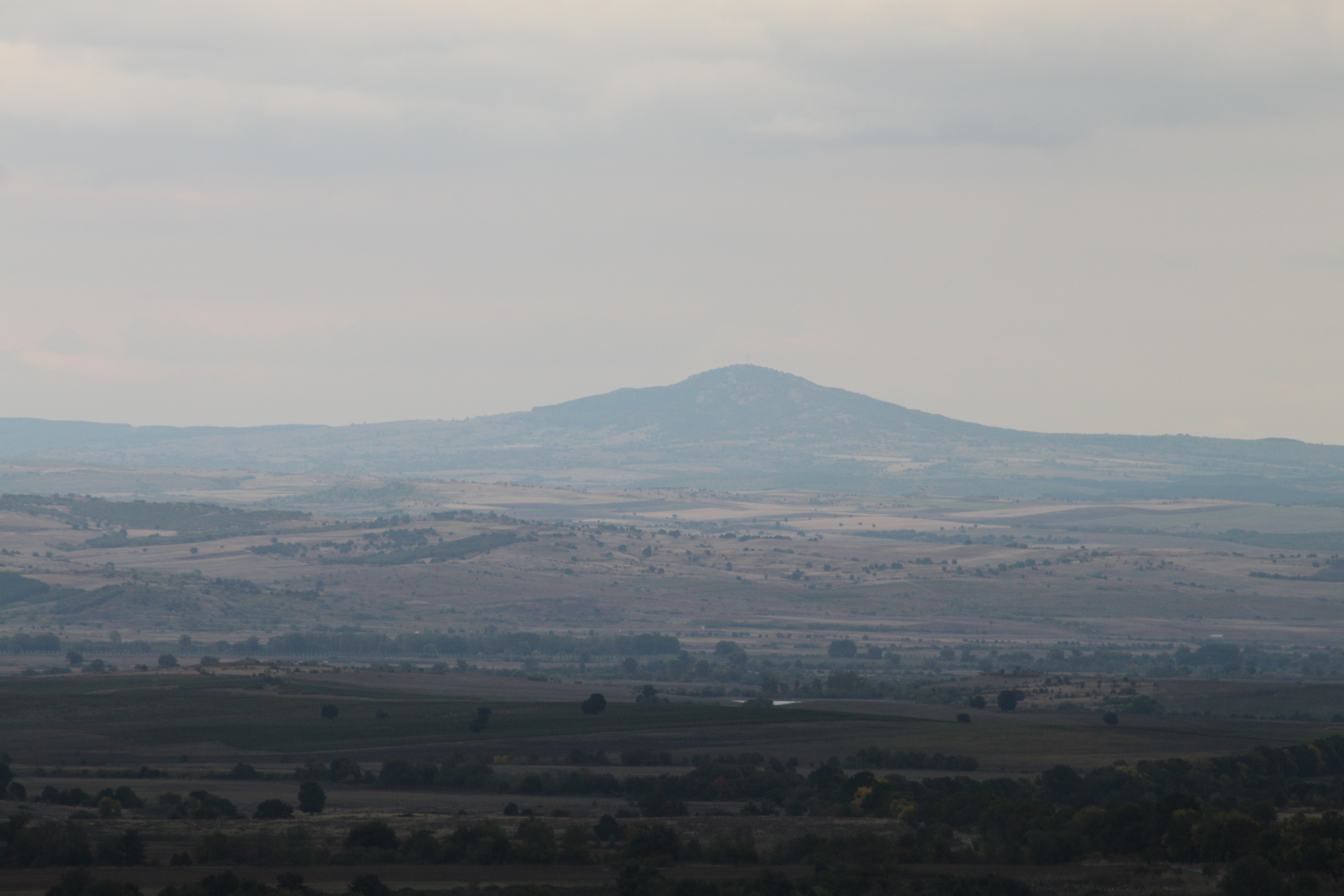

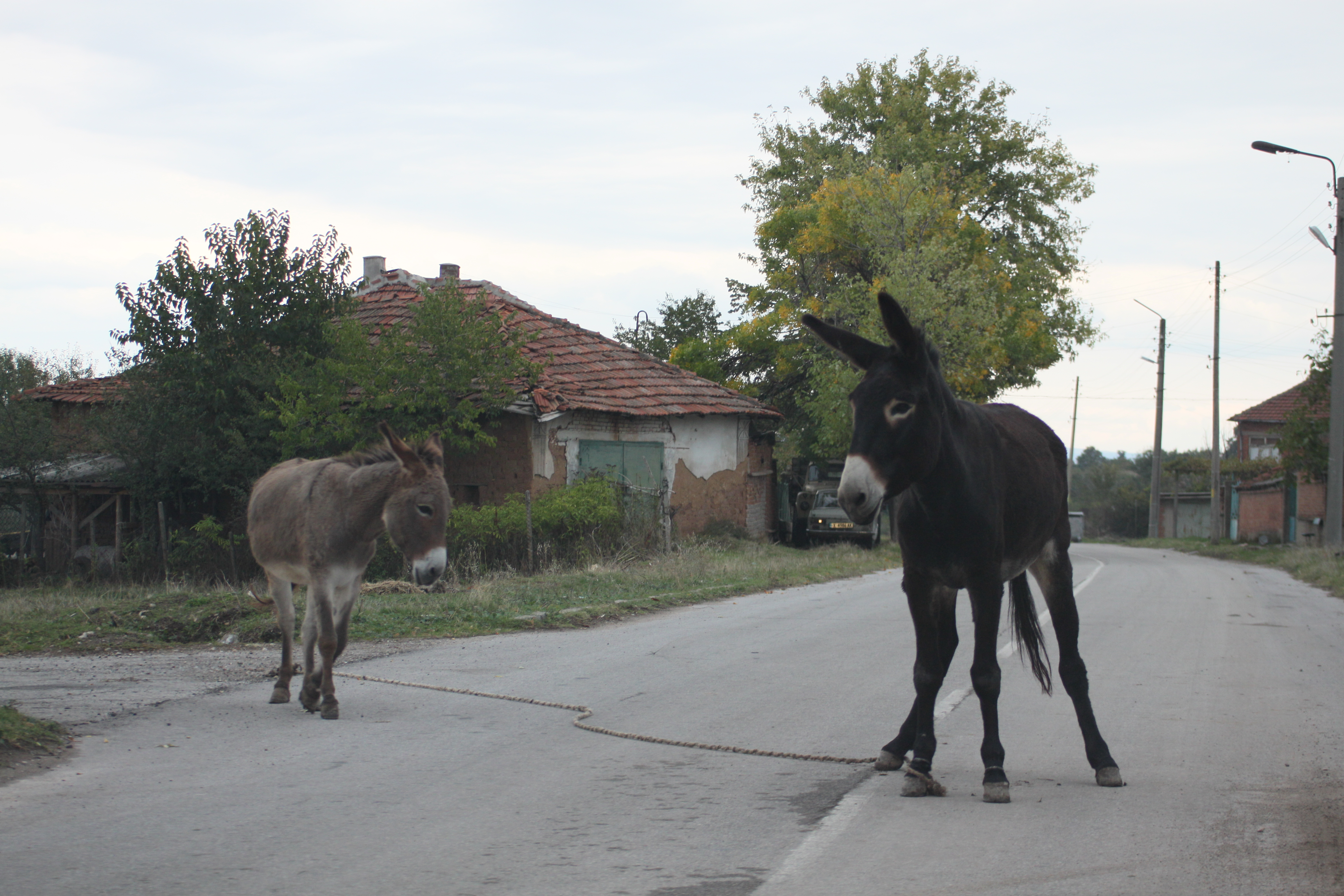

Malko Gradishte is a village in the municipality of Lyubimets, in Haskovo Province, in southern Bulgaria.

The village is located 14 km from the town of Lubimets, 18 km from Svilengrad, and 64 km from Haskovo. In the center of the village is a large square, in the center of which stands a marble monument honoring those who died in the wars. Around the square are the buildings of the town hall, a health care center, a community center, a cooperative, a bus station, and a restaurant with a large park.
