= Dabovets =

- Village
- Interactive map of Dabovets
- Coordinates: 41°40′9″N 25°59′32″E
- Country: Bulgaria
- Province: Haskovo Province
- Municipality: Lyubimets
- Time zone: UTC+2 (EET)
  - Summer (DST): UTC+3 (EEST)

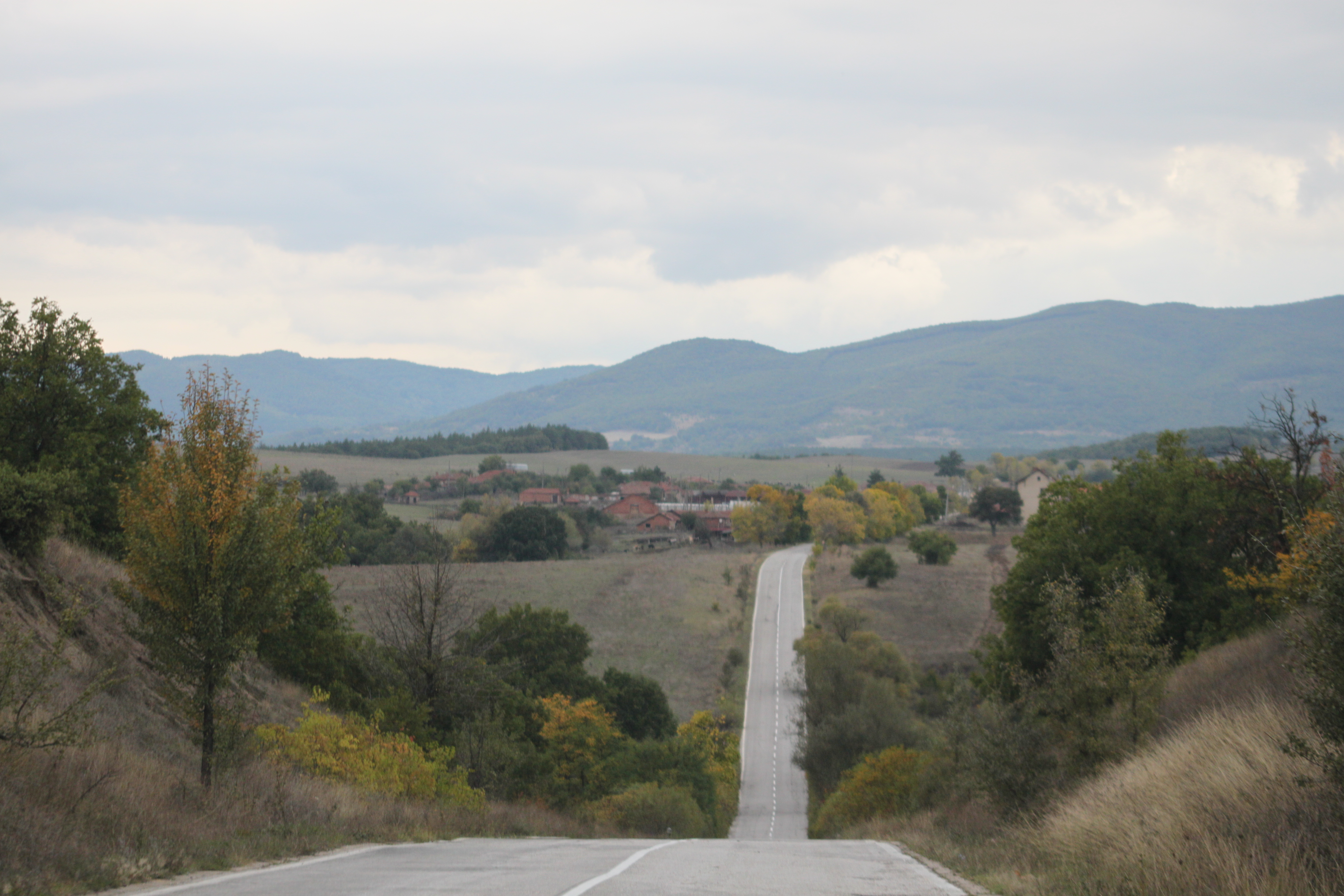
Dabovets, a village in the Rhodope Mountains, Bulgaria

Dabovets is a village in the municipality of Lyubimets, in Haskovo Province, in southern Bulgaria.
