= Georgi Dobrevo =

- Village
- Location within Bulgaria
- Coordinates: 41°52′N 26°08′E
- Country: Bulgaria
- Province: Haskovo Province
- Municipality: Lyubimets
- Time zone: UTC+2 (EET)
  - Summer (DST): UTC+3 (EEST)

Georgi Dobrevo is a village in the municipality of Lyubimets, in Haskovo Province, in southern Bulgaria. It was known as Bunaklı (also Yunaklu and Bunaklu in 16th Ottoman records) before 1934
