= Oryahovo, Haskovo Province =

- Village
- Location within Bulgaria
- Coordinates: 41.9167°N 26.1667°E
- Country: Bulgaria
- Province: Haskovo Province
- Municipality: Lyubimets
- Time zone: UTC+2 (EET)
  - Summer (DST): UTC+3 (EEST)

Oryahovo, Haskovo Province is a village in the municipality of Lyubimets, in Haskovo Province, in southern Bulgaria.
