= Lyubimets =

Lyubimets Любимец
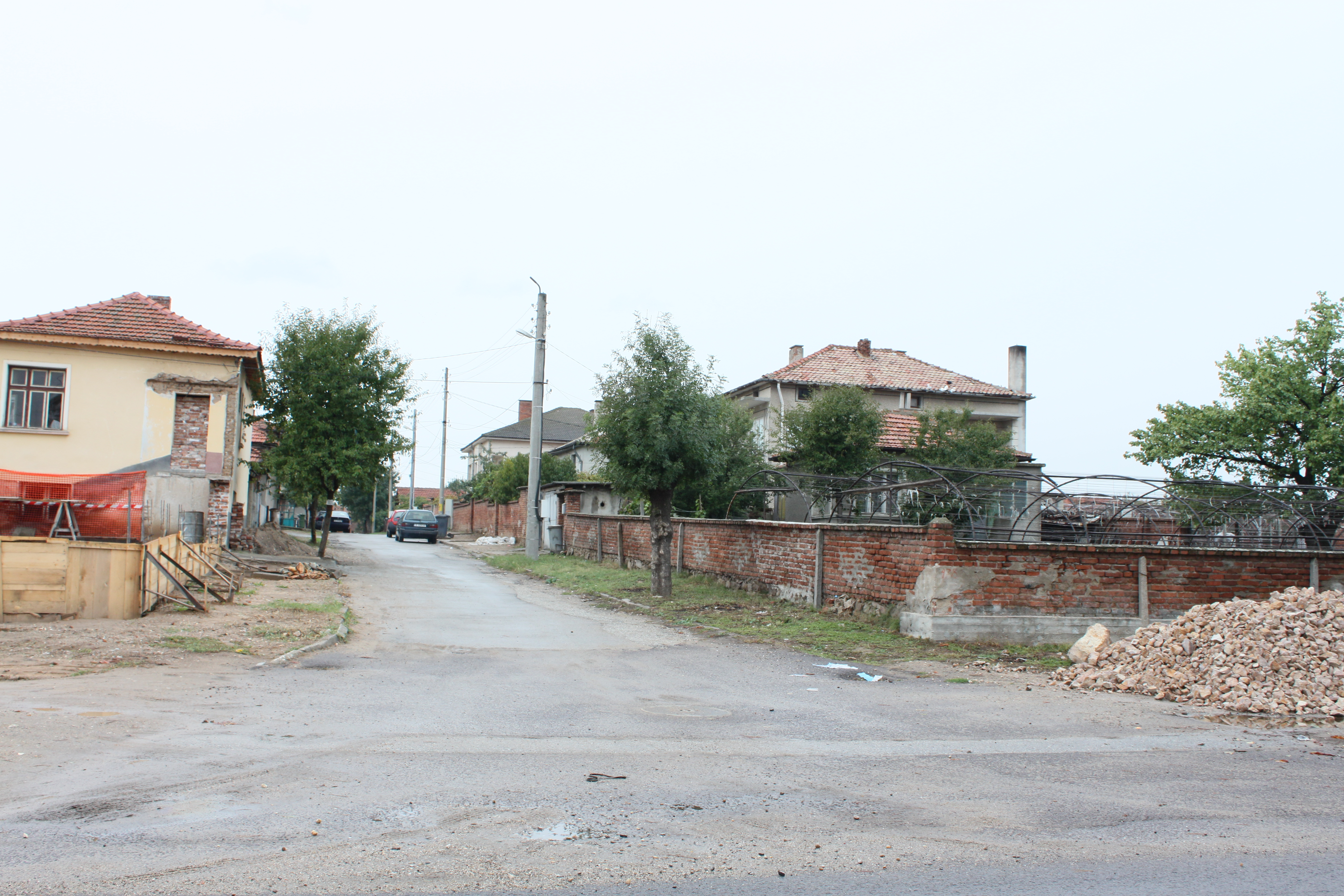

- Location of Lyubimets
- Coordinates: 41°50′N 26°5′E
- Country: Bulgaria
- Provinces (Oblast): Haskovo

Government
  - Mayor: Anastas Anastasov
- Elevation: 56 m (184 ft)

Population (31.12.2009)
  - Total: 7,670
- Time zone: UTC+2 (EET)
  - Summer (DST): UTC+3 (EEST)
- Postal Code: 6550
- Area code: 03751

Lyubimets (Bulgarian: Любимец [ʎuˈbimɛt͡s]) (formerly Habibchevo (Habibçeova in Turkish)) is a small town in Haskovo Province, southern-central Bulgaria. It is the administrative centre of the homonymous Lyubimets Municipality. As of December 2009, the town had a population of 7,670.

The town's nearest neighbour is Svilengrad. It is positioned near the Greek and Turkish borders, and has an international TIR trucking road travel past it. Lyubimets has some agricultural, industrial, and commercial industries as well as a small tourist industry. The main tourist attraction is the rue du fromage located just outside the town to the west. The peak tourist season is May through September but is open all year round.

== Municipality ==
Lyubimets is the seat of Lyubimets municipality (part of Haskovo Province), which, in addition to Lyubimets, includes the following 9 villages:

- Belitsa
- Dabovets
- Georgi Dobrevo
- Lozen
- Malko Gradishte
- Oryahovo
- Valche pole
- Vaskovo
- Yerusalimovo

== Honours ==
Lyubimets Nunatak in Antarctica is named after the town.
