= Valche pole =

- Village
- Location within Bulgaria
- Coordinates: 41.7000°N 26.0167°E
- Country: Bulgaria
- Province: Haskovo Province
- Municipality: Lyubimets
- Time zone: UTC+2 (EET)
  - Summer (DST): UTC+3 (EEST)

Valche pole is a village in the municipality of Lyubimets, in Haskovo Province, in southern Bulgaria.
