= Losen =

Losen may refer to:

- Lösen, a village in Sweden
- Losen Records, a Norwegian record label

== See also ==
- Lozen (disambiguation)
- Lossen, a surname, see
- Lausen, a municipality in Switzerland
