= Yerusalimovo =

- Village
- Location in Bulgaria
- Coordinates: 41°53′46″N 26°06′06″E
- Country: Bulgaria
- Province: Haskovo Province
- Municipality: Lyubimets
- Time zone: UTC+2 (EET)
  - Summer (DST): UTC+3 (EEST)

Yerusalimovo is a village in the municipality of Lyubimets, in Haskovo Province, in southern Bulgaria.
