= Vaskovo, Primorsky District, Arkhangelsk Oblast =

Vaskovo Васьково
- Settlement
- Location within Arkhangelsk Oblast Location within Russia
- Coordinates: 64°24′N 40°27′E
- Country: Russia
- Region: Arkhangelsk Oblast
- District: Primorsky District
- Time zone: UTC+3:00

Vaskovo (Russian: Васьково) is a rural locality (a settlement) in Lisestrovskoye Rural Settlement of Primorsky District, Arkhangelsk Oblast, Russia. The population was 989 as of 2010.

== Geography ==
Vaskovo is located 25 km south of Arkhangelsk (the district's administrative centre) by road. Verkhniye Valdushki is the nearest rural locality.
