= Lozen Monastery =

Bulgarian monastery

Sveti Spas
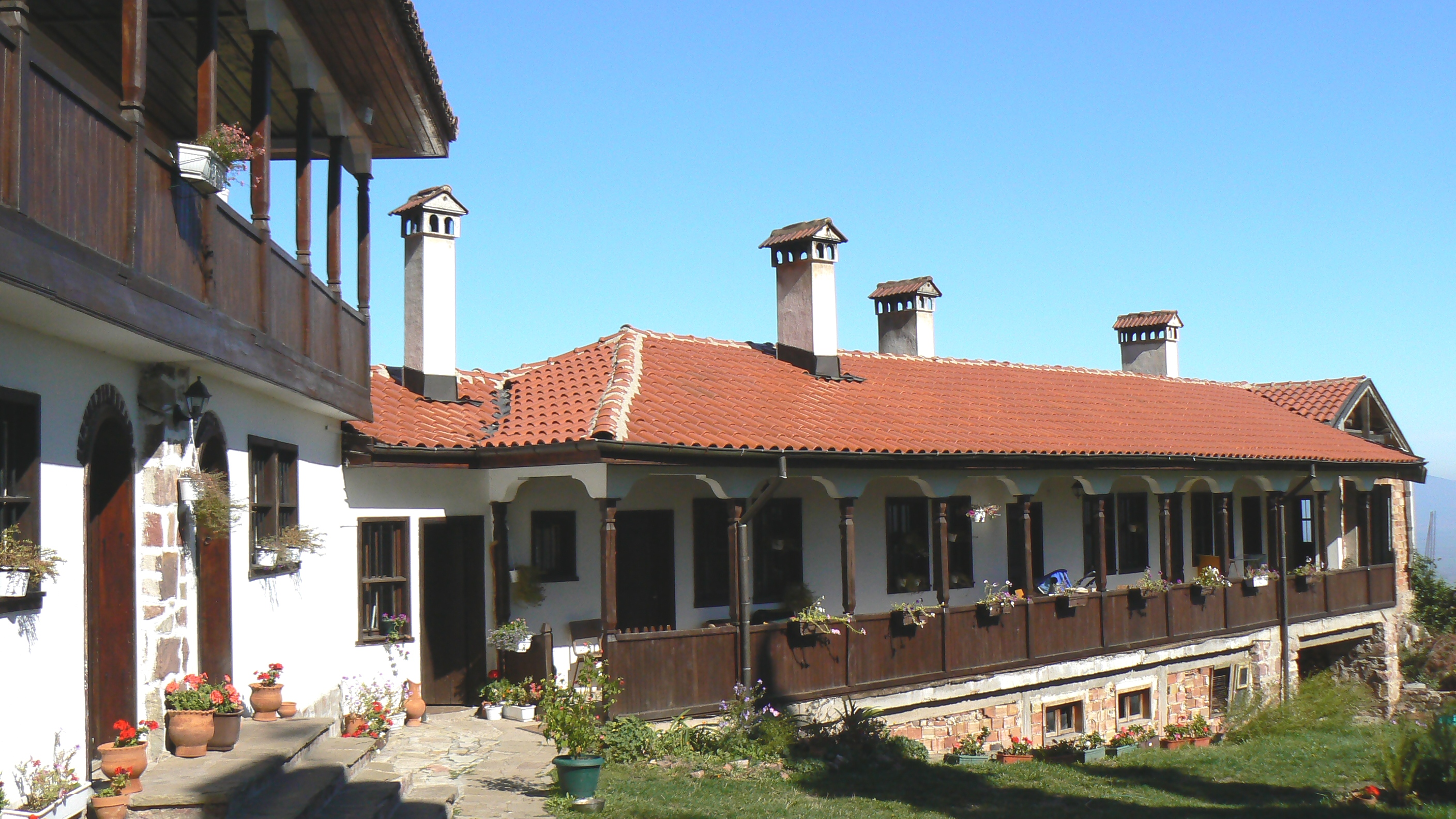
- Lozen Monastery
- Interactive map of Sveti Spas

Monastery information
- Denomination: Eastern Orthodox
- Established: 13th century
- Dedication: Holy Ascension

People
- Abbess: Mother Agatha

Architecture
- Functional status: Active convent

Site
- Location: Lozen, Bulgaria
- Coordinates: 42°36′00″N 23°28′58″E
- Public access: Yes

The Lozen Monastery of St. Spas (Bulgarian: Лозенски манастир „Свети Спас“) in the village of Lozen is a Bulgarian monastery built during the Second Bulgarian Empire. It is the easternmost house of Mala Sveta Gora, a monastic complex that formed around Sofia in the 13th century. The church is dedicated to the Ascension (Spasovden).

== Location ==
The monastery lies southeast of the village of Lozen, near Sofia, in the Lozen Mountain below the Polovrak peak, on a natural terrace overlooking the Sofia Valley.

== History ==
=== Origins ===
The monastery was founded in the 13th century. After the Ottoman conquest of Sofia in 1382 it was plundered and destroyed, and was restored only in the 17th century. Written records, the oldest from 1671, document a literary and calligraphic school active at the monastery between 1671 and 1694. In 1737 the monastery was a centre of the uprising of the bishops of Sofia and Samokov; after the revolt was suppressed in late July and early August 1737, around 350 priests, monks and citizens of the Sofia region were executed by order of Ali Pasha Kyupryulyuoglu, among them St Simeon, bishop of Samokov. The monastery was burned again afterwards.

=== Revival ===
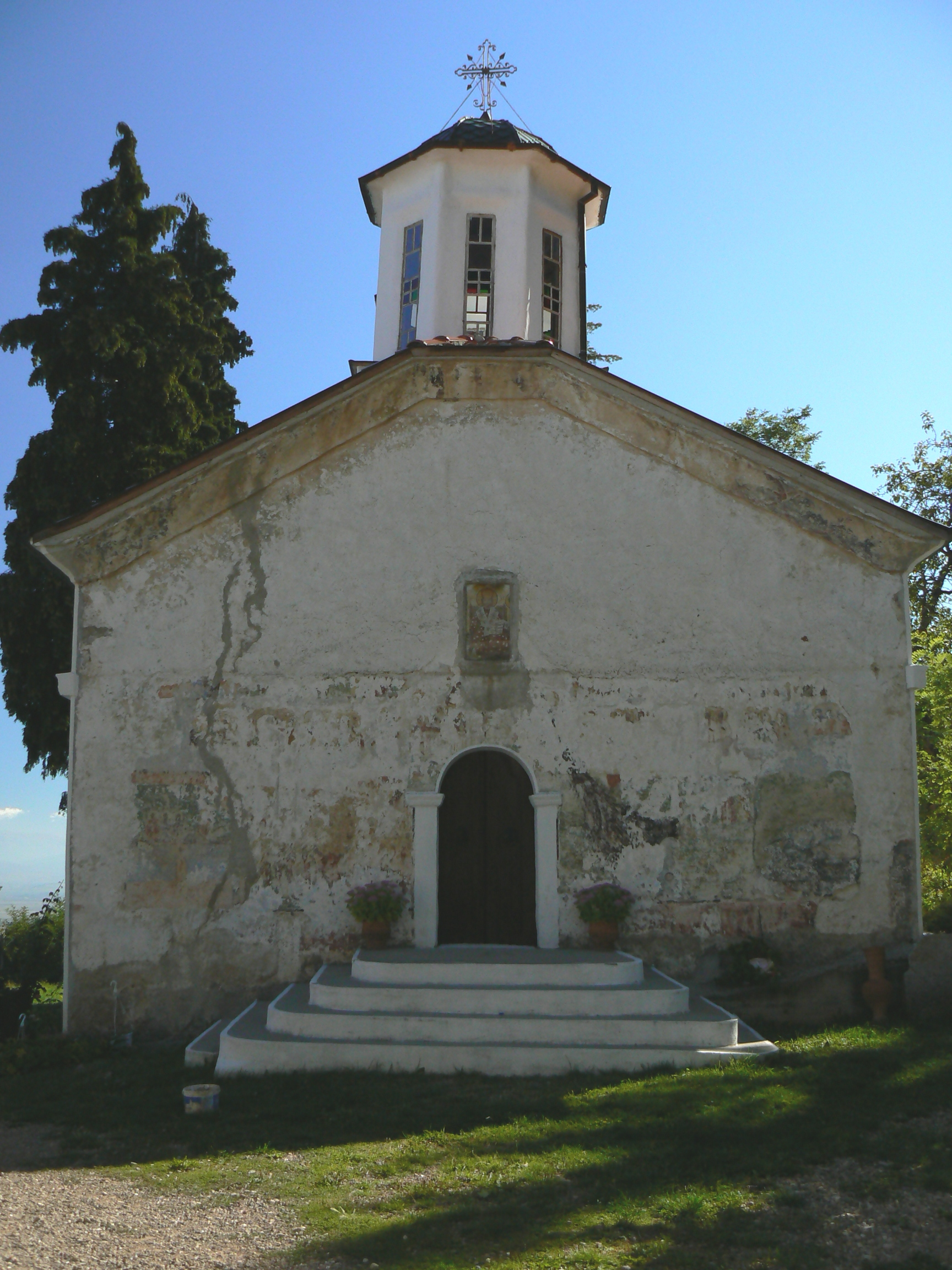
Front view of the church

In 1821 the monastery was rebuilt on its old foundations, and the present one-apse, one-nave Church of the Holy Ascension was constructed, crowned by three domes on tall octagonal drums. In 1869 the Samokov painter Nikola Obrazopisov, with his assistants Hristaki Zahariev and Dimitar Hristov, repainted the church and its domes. The frescoes survive in relatively good condition.

Alongside biblical scenes, the murals depict many Bulgarian saints and historical figures, among them Saints Cyril and Methodius, John of Rila, Euthymius of Tarnovo and Onufari of Gabrovo. The church also preserves a donor portrait of the abbot Kiryak dated 1868.

Bulgarian church tradition holds that the monastery was a centre of the national liberation movement and that Vasil Levski stayed there. It remained a men's monastery until 1900, when it became a convent.

== Condition of the monastery today ==
The monastery is an active convent. Several of its buildings, including a residential wing, the cells and a two-storey guest house, have been restored in recent years, and the frescoes in the three domes have been conserved; those on the outer western façade are largely lost. The monastery stands in dense oak forest, with several springs nearby.
