= Lozen, Sofia City Province =

Lozen
- Village
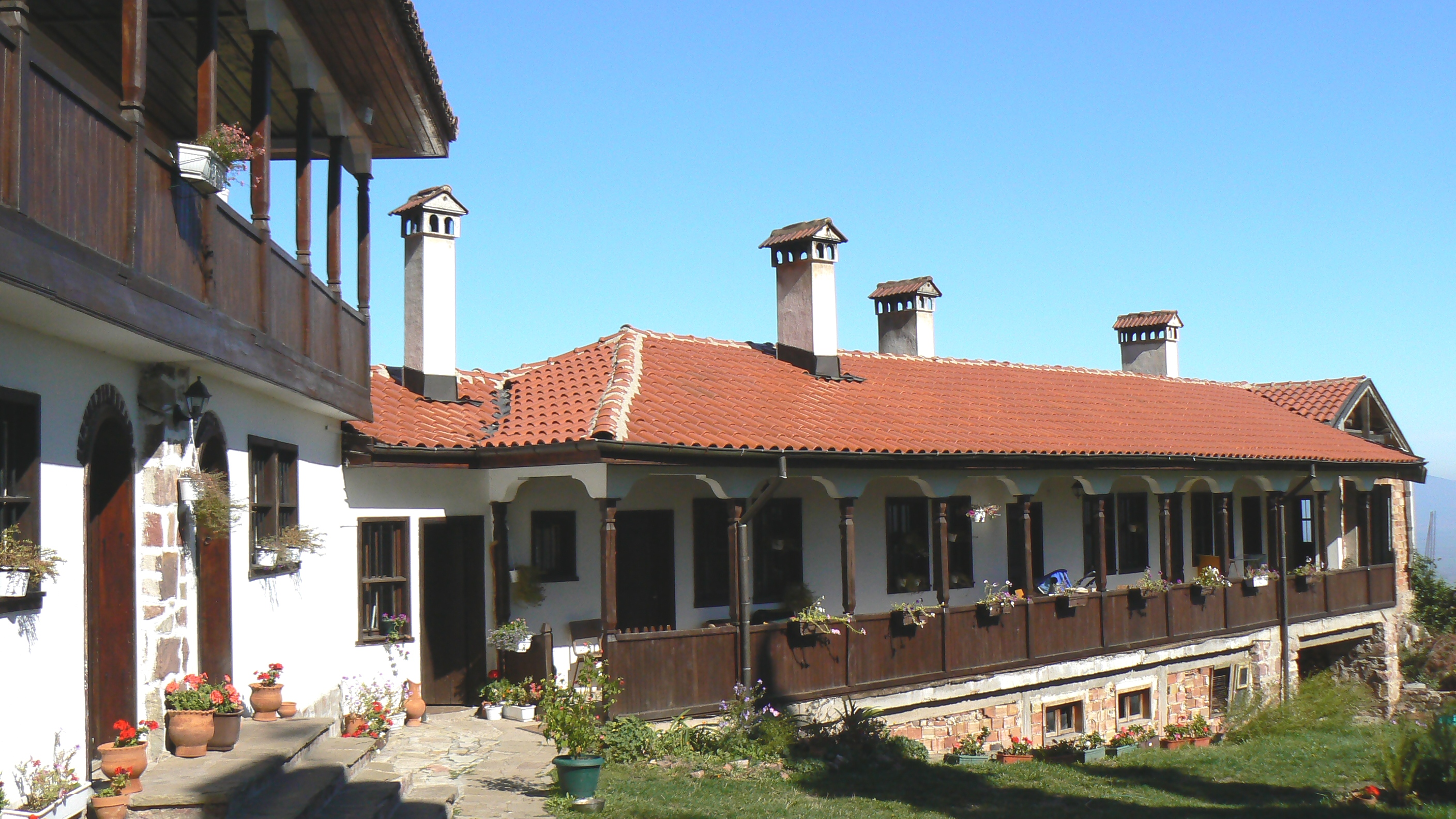
- The Lozen Monastery

- Location within Bulgaria
- Coordinates: 42°36′00″N 23°28′59″E
- Country: Bulgaria
- Province: Sofia City
- Municipality: Stolichna

Area
  - Total: 34.244 km^{2} (13.222 sq mi)
- Elevation: 708 m (2,323 ft)

Population (2011)
  - Total: 6,312
  - Density: 184.3/km^{2} (477.4/sq mi)
- Time zone: UTC+2 (EET)
  - Summer (DST): UTC+3 (EEST)
- Postal code: 1151
- Area code: 02992
- Climate: Dfb

Lozen (Bulgarian: Лозен) is a village located in the Stolichna Municipality of Sofia City Province, Bulgaria.
