= Vaskovo =

Haskovo
- Village
- Location within Bulgaria
- Coordinates: 41°56′N 26°14′E
- Country: Bulgaria
- Province: Haskovo Province
- Municipality: Lyubimets
- Time zone: UTC+2 (EET)
  - Summer (DST): UTC+3 (EEST)

Vaskovo is a village in the municipality of Lyubimets, in Haskovo Province, in southern Bulgaria.
