= Lyubimets Municipality =

Lyubimets Municipality Община Любимец
- Municipality
- Location within Bulgaria
- Coordinates: 41°50′N 26°5′E
- Country: Bulgaria
- Province: Haskovo
- Municipality: Lyubimets

Area
  - Total: 344.27 km^{2} (132.92 sq mi)

Population (1-Feb-2011)
  - Total: 10,214
  - Density: 29.669/km^{2} (76.841/sq mi)
- Time zone: UTC+2 (EET)
  - Summer (DST): UTC+3 (EEST)
- Website: www.lyubimets.org

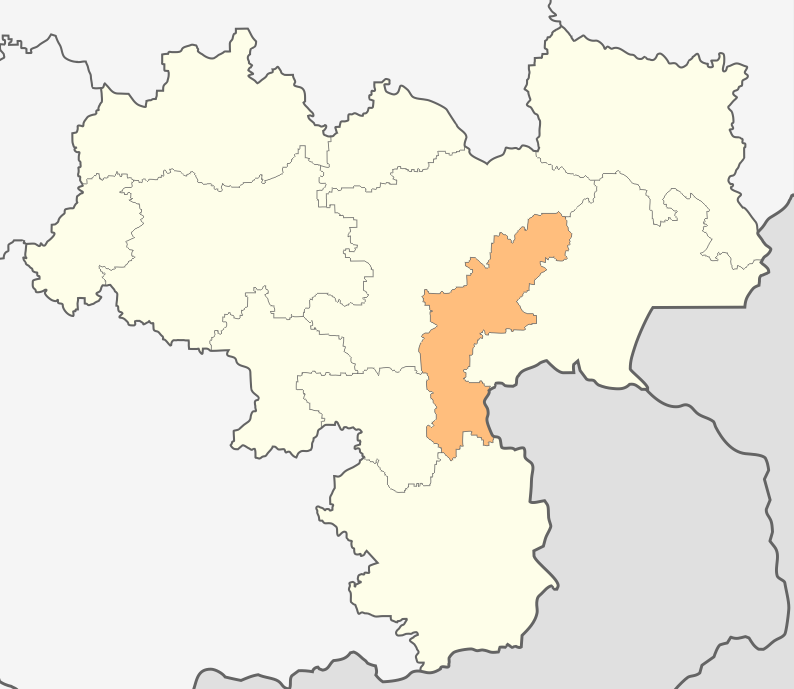
Lyubimets municipality within Haskovo Province

Lyubimets Municipality is a municipality in Haskovo Province, Bulgaria. The administrative centre is Lyubimets.

== Demography ==
=== Religion ===
According to the latest Bulgarian census of 2011, the religious composition, among those who answered the optional question on religious identification, was the following:

Religious composition of Lyubimets Municipality
Orthodox Christianity	91.5%
Catholicism	0.4%
Protestantism	0.5%
Islam	0.9%
No religion	3.8%
Prefer not to answer, others and indefinable	2.9%
