= List of protected areas of Bulgaria =

This is a list of protected areas in Bulgaria which includes 3 national parks, 11 nature parks and 55 nature reserves. The national policy for governing and management of the protected areas is implemented by the Ministry of Environment and Water. The first nature park in Bulgaria and the Balkan Peninsula is Vitosha Nature Park, established in 1934. All of the nationally protected areas in Bulgaria are also part of the Natura 2000 network of protected natural areas in the territory of the European Union. Bulgaria has some of the largest Natura 2000 areas in the European Union covering 33.8% of its territory.

Declared UNESCO World Heritage Site, part of a World Heritage Site or contains such site
Declared UNESCO Biosphere Reserve or contains such reserve
Declared both UNESCO World Heritage Site (or part of a World Heritage Site or contains such site) and UNESCO Biosphere Reserve or contains such reserve
- Parks and reserves in italic letters are part of Global 200 ecoregions.

== National Parks ==
| Name | Photo | Area | Established | Location |
|---|---|---|---|---|
| Central Balkan National Park | | 716.69 km^{2} | 1991 | List of protected areas of Bulgaria is located in Bulgaria |
| Pirin National Park | | 403.56 km^{2} | 1962 | List of protected areas of Bulgaria is located in Bulgaria |
| Rila National Park | | 810.46 km^{2} | 1992 | List of protected areas of Bulgaria is located in Bulgaria |

== Nature Parks ==
| Name | Photo | Area | Established | Location |
|---|---|---|---|---|
| Belasitsa Nature Park | | 117.32 km^{2} | 2007 | List of protected areas of Bulgaria is located in Bulgaria |
| Bulgarka Nature Park | | 217.72 km^{2} | 2002 | List of protected areas of Bulgaria is located in Bulgaria |
| Golden Sands Nature Park | | 13.20 km^{2} | 1947 | List of protected areas of Bulgaria is located in Bulgaria |
| Persina Nature Park | | 217.62 km^{2} | 2000 | List of protected areas of Bulgaria is located in Bulgaria |
| Rila Monastery Nature Park | | 252.53 km^{2} | 2000 | List of protected areas of Bulgaria is located in Bulgaria |
| Rusenski Lom Nature Park | | 32.60 km^{2} | 1970 | List of protected areas of Bulgaria is located in Bulgaria |
| Sinite Kamani Nature Park | | 113.80 km^{2} | 1980 | List of protected areas of Bulgaria is located in Bulgaria |
| Shumen Plateau Nature Park | | 39.3 km^{2} | 1980 | List of protected areas of Bulgaria is located in Bulgaria |
| Strandzha Nature Park | | 1,161.00 km^{2} | 1995 | List of protected areas of Bulgaria is located in Bulgaria |
| Vitosha Nature Park | | 270.79 km^{2} | 1934 | List of protected areas of Bulgaria is located in Bulgaria |
| Vrachanski Balkan Nature Park | | 288.44 km^{2} | 1989 | List of protected areas of Bulgaria is located in Bulgaria |

== Nature Reserves ==
| Name | Photo | Area | Established | Location |
|---|---|---|---|---|
| Ali Botush Reserve | | 11.86 km^{2} | 1951 | List of protected areas of Bulgaria is located in Bulgaria |
| Atanasovo Lake | | 10.32 km^{2} | 1980 | List of protected areas of Bulgaria is located in Bulgaria |
| Bayuvi Dupki–Dzhindzhiritsa | | 28.73 km^{2} | 1934 | List of protected areas of Bulgaria is located in Bulgaria |
| Beglika Reserve | | 14.61 km^{2} | 1960 | List of protected areas of Bulgaria is located in Bulgaria |
| Beli Lom Reserve | | 7.75 km^{2} | 1980 | List of protected areas of Bulgaria is located in Bulgaria |
| Bistrishko Branishte | | 10.61 km^{2} | 1934 | List of protected areas of Bulgaria is located in Bulgaria |
| Boatin Reserve | | 15.97 km^{2} | 1948 | List of protected areas of Bulgaria is located in Bulgaria |
| Bogdan Reserve | | 1.13 km^{2} | 1972 | List of protected areas of Bulgaria is located in Bulgaria |
| Bukaka Reserve | | 0.62 km^{2} | 1980 | List of protected areas of Bulgaria is located in Bulgaria |
| Byala Krava Reserve | | 0.93 km^{2} | 1968 | List of protected areas of Bulgaria is located in Bulgaria |
| Chervenata stena | | 123.94 km^{2} | | List of protected areas of Bulgaria is located in Bulgaria |
| Chuprene | | 123.94 km^{2} | | List of protected areas of Bulgaria is located in Bulgaria |
| Central Rila Reserve | | 123.94 km^{2} | 1992 | List of protected areas of Bulgaria is located in Bulgaria |
| Dupkata Reserve | | 12.10 km^{2} | 1951 | List of protected areas of Bulgaria is located in Bulgaria |
| Dzhendema | | 42.2 km^{2} | 1953 | List of protected areas of Bulgaria is located in Bulgaria |
| Elenova Gora Reserve | | 0.53 km^{2} | 1961 | List of protected areas of Bulgaria is located in Bulgaria |
| Gornata Koria Reserve | | 1.61 km^{2} | 1968 | List of protected areas of Bulgaria is located in Bulgaria |
| Gorna Topchia Reserve | | 1.64 km^{2} | 1951 | List of protected areas of Bulgaria is located in Bulgaria |
| Ibar Reserve | | 22.48 km^{2} | 1985 | List of protected areas of Bulgaria is located in Bulgaria |
| Kamchia Reserve | | 8.50 km^{2} | 1951 | List of protected areas of Bulgaria is located in Bulgaria |
| Kamenshtitsa Reserve | | 10.16 km^{2} | 1984 | List of protected areas of Bulgaria is located in Bulgaria |
| Kaliakra | | 7.13 km^{2} | 1941 | List of protected areas of Bulgaria is located in Bulgaria |
| Kazanite Reserve | | 1.61 km^{2} | 1983 | List of protected areas of Bulgaria is located in Bulgaria |
| Kozya Stena Reserve | | 9.04 km^{2} | 1987 | List of protected areas of Bulgaria is located in Bulgaria |
| Kongura Reserve | | 13.10 km^{2} | 1988 | List of protected areas of Bulgaria is located in Bulgaria |
| Mantaritza Reserve | | 10.68 km^{2} | 1968 | List of protected areas of Bulgaria is located in Bulgaria |
| Orelyak Reserve | | 7.58 km^{2} | 1985 | List of protected areas of Bulgaria is located in Bulgaria |
| Parangalitsa Reserve | | 15.09 km^{2} | 1933 | List of protected areas of Bulgaria is located in Bulgaria |
| Peeshti Skali Reserve | | 14.65 km^{2} | 1979 | List of protected areas of Bulgaria is located in Bulgaria |
| Poda | | 1.01 km^{2} | 1989 | List of protected areas of Bulgaria is located in Bulgaria |
| Rila Monastery Forest | | 36.71 km^{2} | 1986 | List of protected areas of Bulgaria is located in Bulgaria |
| Ropotamo Reserve | | 10.00 km^{2} | 1940 | List of protected areas of Bulgaria is located in Bulgaria |
| Severen Dzhendem Reserve | | 16.10 km^{2} | 1983 | List of protected areas of Bulgaria is located in Bulgaria |
| Silkosiya Reserve | | 3.89 km^{2} | 1931 | List of protected areas of Bulgaria is located in Bulgaria |
| Skakavitsa Reserve | | 0.70 km^{2} | 1968 | List of protected areas of Bulgaria is located in Bulgaria |
| Sokolna Reserve | | 12.50 km^{2} | 1979 | List of protected areas of Bulgaria is located in Bulgaria |
| Srebarna Nature Reserve | | 8.72 km^{2} | 1948 | List of protected areas of Bulgaria is located in Bulgaria |
| Sredoka Reserve | | 6.07 km^{2} | 1989 | List of protected areas of Bulgaria is located in Bulgaria |
| Stara Reka Reserve | | 19.74 km^{2} | 1981 | List of protected areas of Bulgaria is located in Bulgaria |
| Steneto Reserve | | 35.78 km^{2} | 1979 | List of protected areas of Bulgaria is located in Bulgaria |
| Tisata | | 5.74 km^{2} | 1949 | List of protected areas of Bulgaria is located in Bulgaria |
| Tisovitsa Reserve | | 7.49 km^{2} | 1990 | List of protected areas of Bulgaria is located in Bulgaria |
| Torfeno Branishte | | 7.85 km^{2} | 1935 | List of protected areas of Bulgaria is located in Bulgaria |
| Tsarichina Reserve | | 34.18 km^{2} | 1949 | List of protected areas of Bulgaria is located in Bulgaria |
| Usungeren | | 2.11 km^{2} | 2005 | List of protected areas of Bulgaria is located in Bulgaria |
| Uzunbodzhak | | 25.29 km^{2} | 1956 | List of protected areas of Bulgaria is located in Bulgaria |
| Valchi Dol Reserve | | 7.76 km^{2} | 1980 | List of protected areas of Bulgaria is located in Bulgaria |
| Vitanovo Reserve | | 11.12 km^{2} | 1981 | List of protected areas of Bulgaria is located in Bulgaria |
| Vrachanski Karst Reserve | | 14.38 km^{2} | 1983 | List of protected areas of Bulgaria is located in Bulgaria |
| Yulen | | 31.56 km^{2} | 1994 | List of protected areas of Bulgaria is located in Bulgaria |

== See also ==
- Geography of Bulgaria
- List of ecoregions in Bulgaria
