= Aladzha Monastery =

Monastery in Bulgaria

Coordinates: 43°16′39″N 28°00′59″E

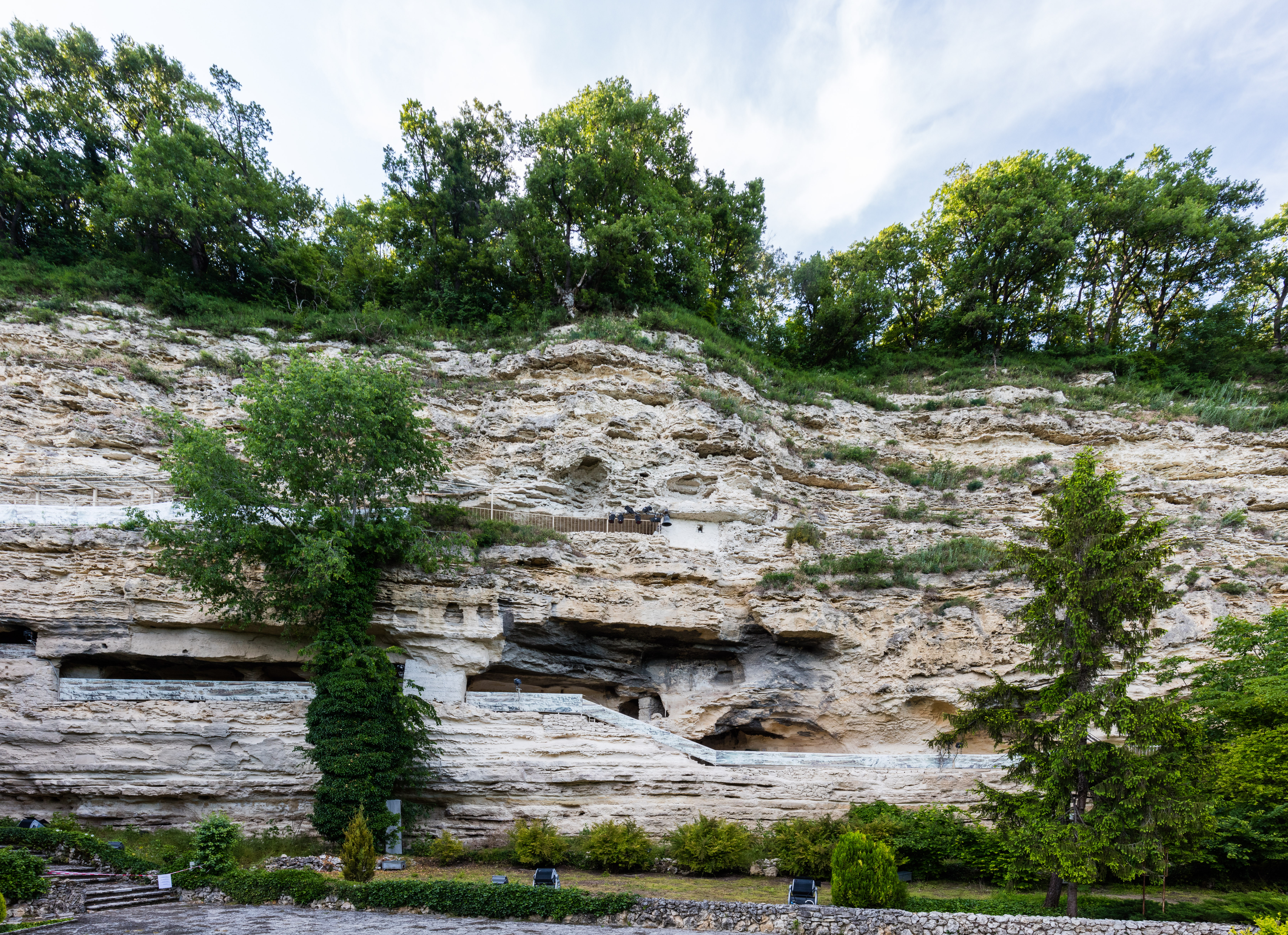
Aladzha Monastery from outside

Aladzha Monastery (Bulgarian: Аладжа манастир) is a medieval Orthodox Christian cave monastery complex in northeastern Bulgaria, 17 km north of central Varna and 3 km west of Golden Sands beach resort, in a protected forest area adjacent to the Golden Sands Nature Park.

The monastery caves were hewn into a 25-m high vertical karst cliff near the upper edge of the Franga Plateau on several levels. The complex includes two small nearby catacombs.

== Dedication ==
Dedicated to the Holy Trinity, it was an active hesychast monastic community of the Second Bulgarian Empire since the 12th century and perhaps survived until the early 18th century. Nearby, remains of a 5th-century cave monastery have been found.

A cave monastery may have existed not far from the modern monastery Aladzha, near Varna. Its early dating to the fourth century is secured by fragments of glassware, but coins of Justinian indicate that the complex may have still been in use during the 500s.

As late as the early 20th century, the forested hills surrounding the monastery and known as Hachuka (Mount of the Cross) or Latin, were regarded by locals as sacred and inhabited by a mythical chthonic daemon treasure keeper, Imri Pop or Rim-Papa.

Today, the grotto is a popular tourist destination. Its present name appeared in the late Ottoman period; Alaca (Turkish for motley) referred to its colourful murals, now almost destroyed. Thematic light shows are being staged in the summer.

== Gallery ==
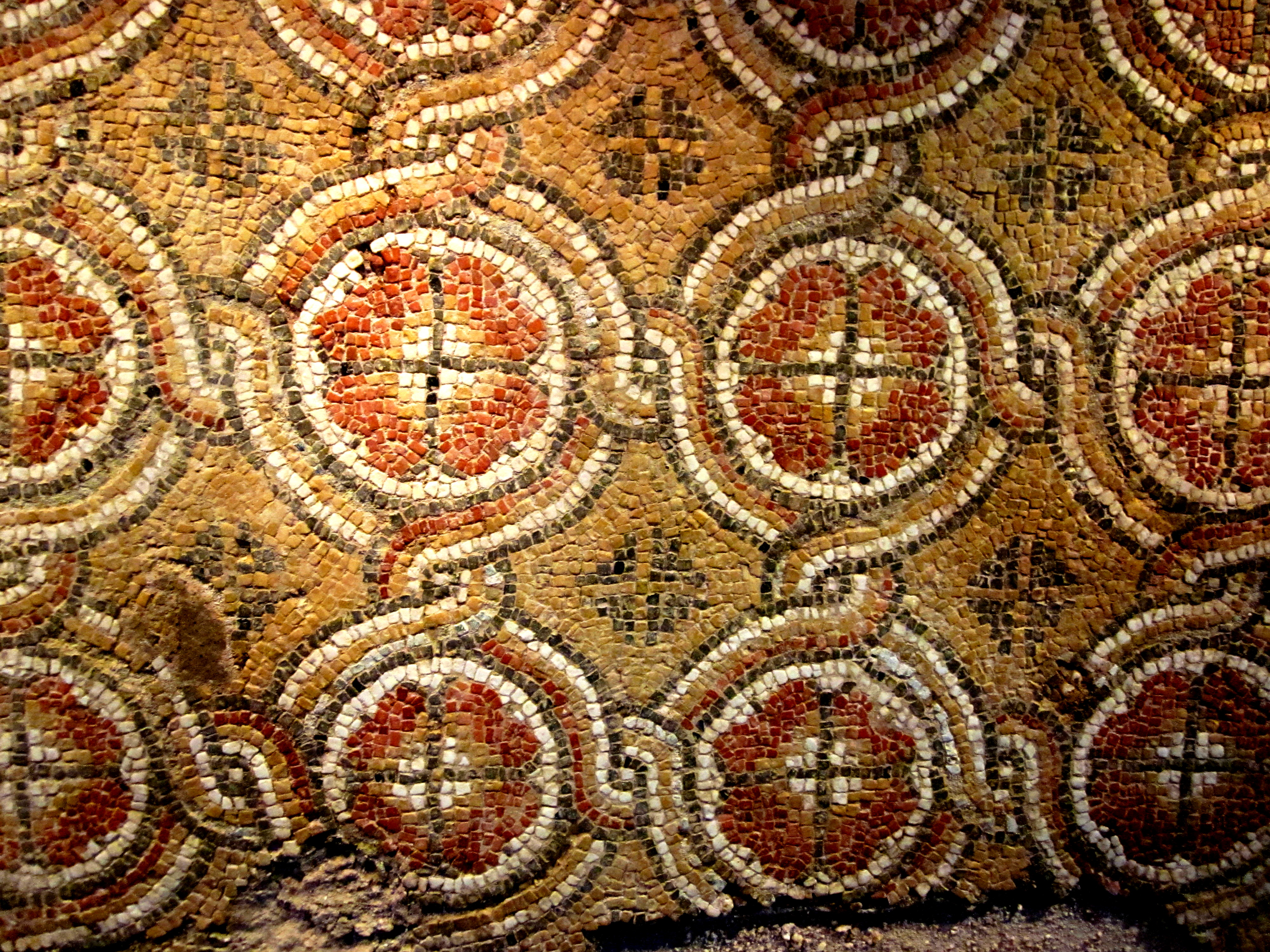
Mosaic in Aladazha Monastery

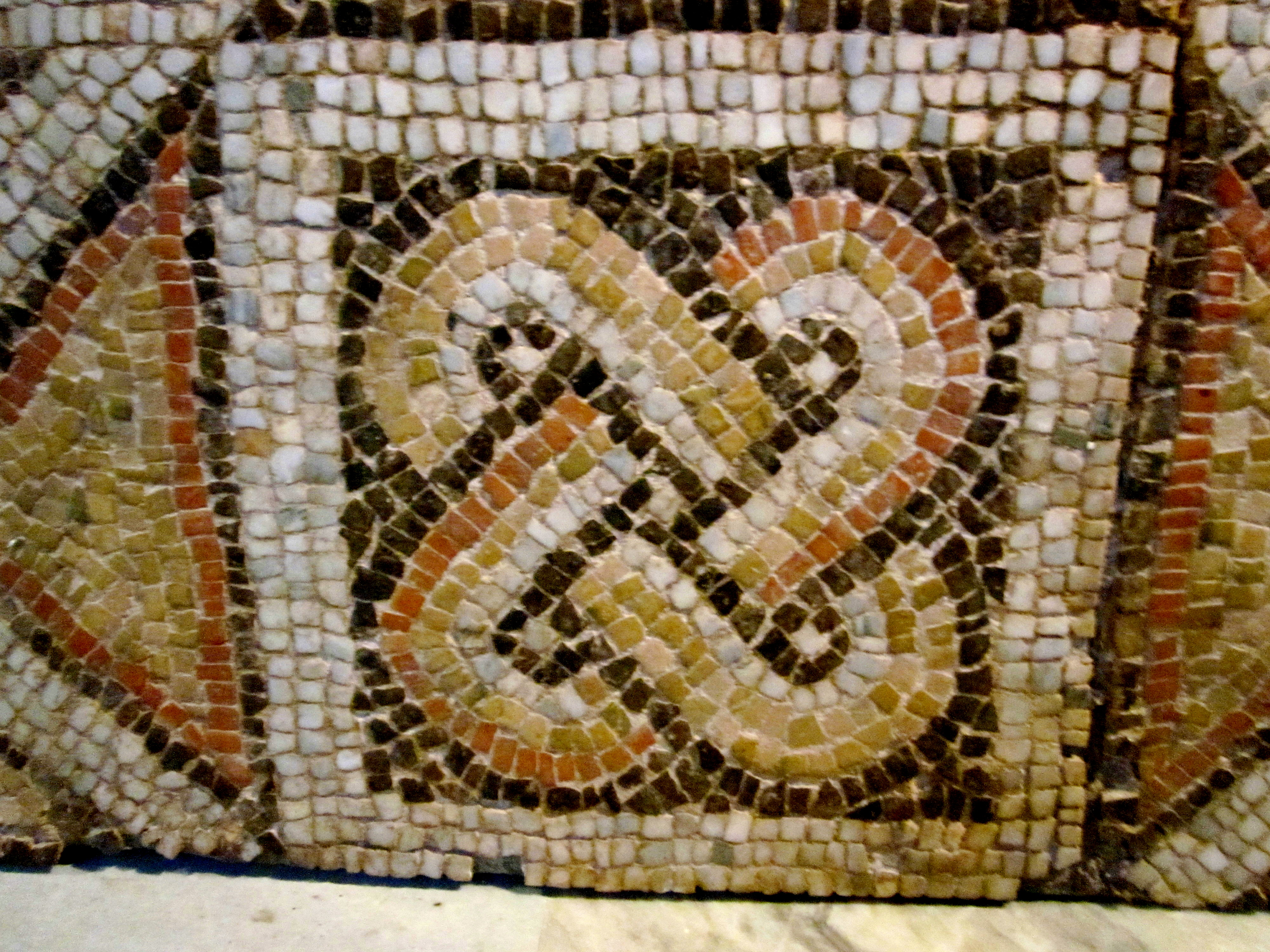
Detail from a mosaic in Aladazha Monastery

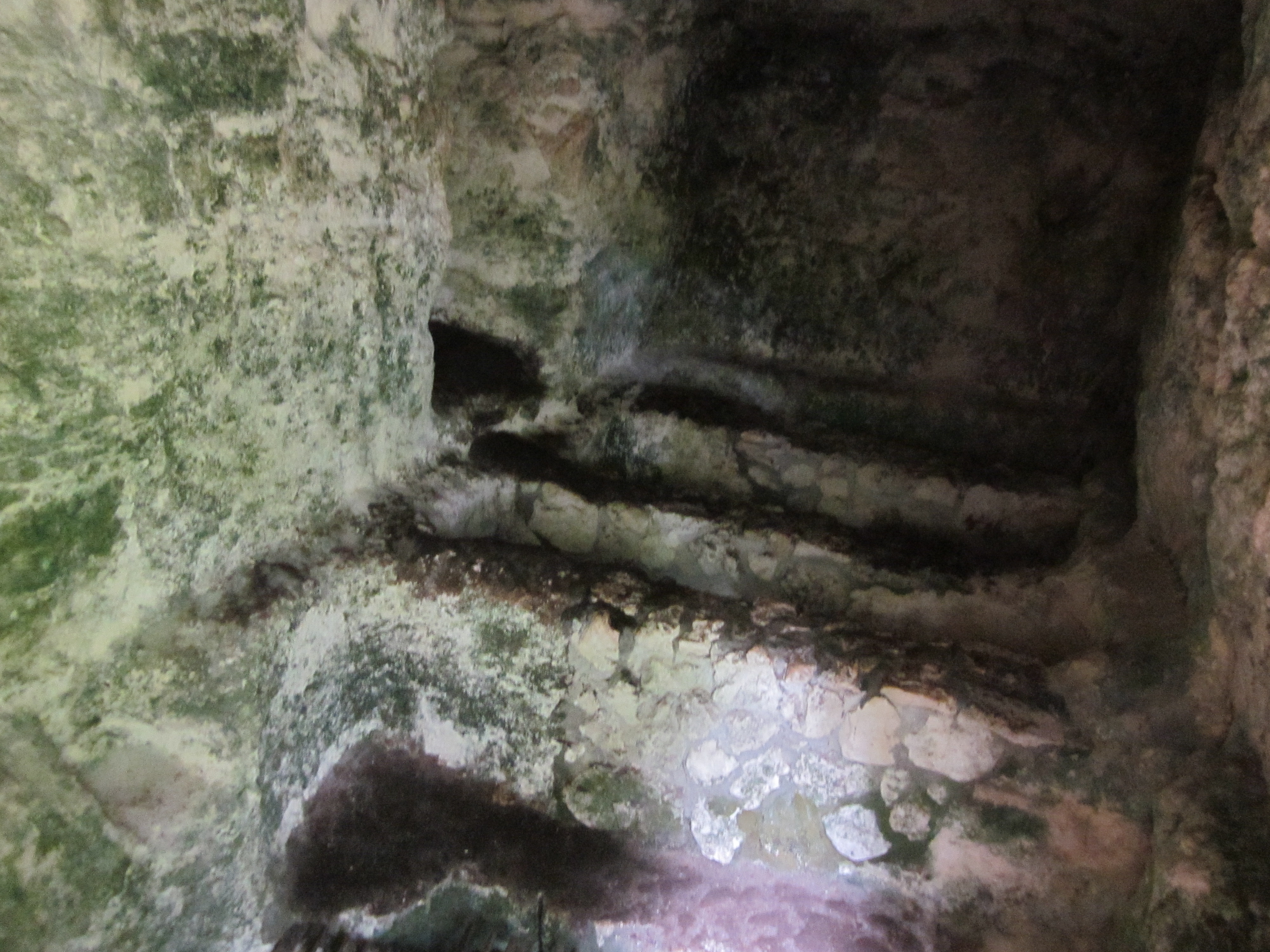
Stone tombs in Aladzha Monastery's catacombs

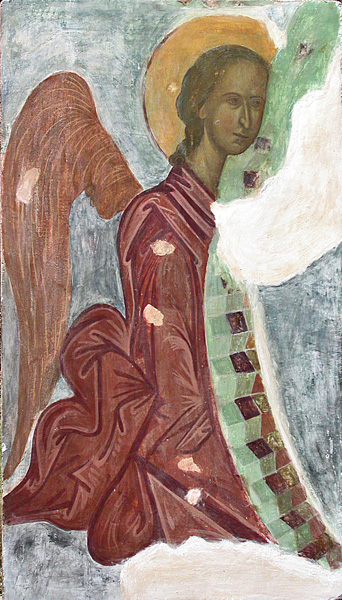
Medieval fresco in the monastery

== Sources ==
- Curta, Florin (2001). The Making of the Slavs: History and Archaeology of the Lower Danube Region, c. 500–700. Cambridge: Cambridge University Press. ISBN 9781139428880.
