= Skakavitsa Reserve =

Nature reserve in Bulgaria

Skakavitsa Nature Reserve
- IUCN category Ia (strict nature reserve)
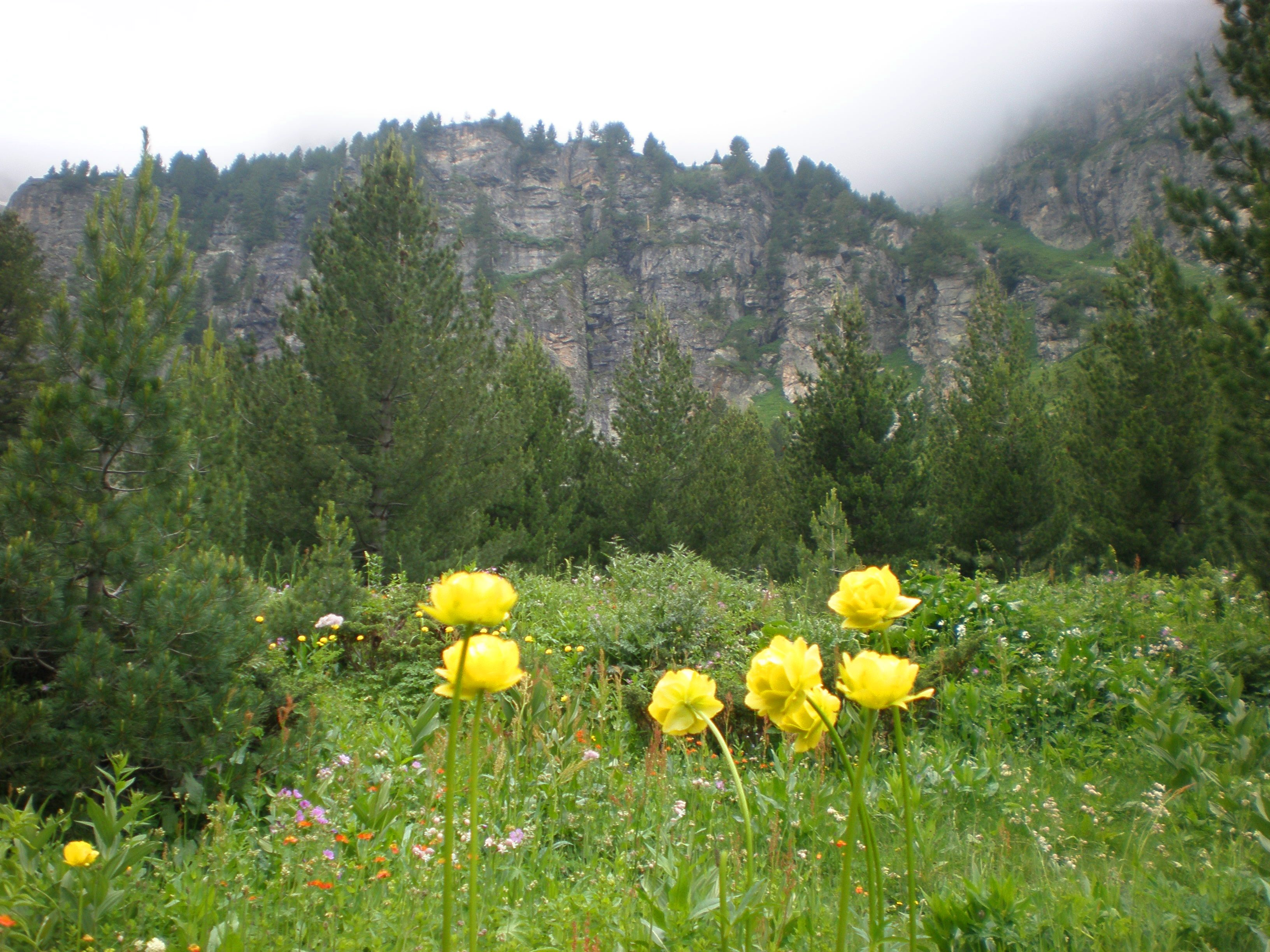

- Location within Bulgaria
- Location: Sapareva Banya Municipality, Kyustendil Province, Bulgaria
- Nearest city: Sapareva Banya
- Coordinates: 42°14′06″N 23°18′18″E
- Area: 0.83 km^{2} (0.32 sq mi)
- Established: 1968
- Governing body: Ministry of Environment and Water

Skakavitsa (Bulgarian: Скакавица) is a nature reserve in Rila National Park, located in the Rila mountain range in southwestern Bulgaria. It was declared in March 1968 to protect undisturbed primary forests of Macedonian pine (Pinus peuce). Spanning a territory of 83 ha or 0.83 km^{2}, it is among the nation’s smallest protected areas.

== Geography ==
Skakavitsa is situated in northwestern Rila in the upper valley of the river Dzherman between 1,850 and 2,050 m altitude. Just south of the reserve's limited territory are located the Skakavitsa Waterfall (70 m), the highest in the mountain range, and the Seven Rila Lakes, both among the most visited tourist attractions in the area. To the north is the small resort of Panichishte. Administratively, it is part of Sapareva Banya Municipality, Kyustendil Province, within the area of the town of Sapareva Banya.

== Flora and fauna ==
Most of Skakavitsa is covered with forests. Due to the high altitude the predominant tree species are coniferous, such as Scots pine (Pinus sylvestris), Austrian pine (Pinus nigra), European silver fir (Abies alba) and Norway spruce (Picea abies). Of high conservation importance are the old growth forests of Macedonian pine in the lower areas of the reserve. There are a number of rare and endemic plant species under protection, such as Trollius europaeus, Geum bulgaricum, Rheum rhaponticum, Gentiana lutea, Aquilegia aurea, Rhodiola rosea, Valeriana montana, Pyrola media, Vaccinium myrtillus, etc.

The fauna is diverse for the reserve’s limited territory, with a number of rare mammal and bird species of conservation importance, including gray wolf, red fox, roe deer, wild boar, Eurasian water shrew, northern nutcracker, Alpine accentor, etc. Reptiles and amphibians are represented by species adapted to high altitudes, such as common European viper, Aesculapian snake, viviparous lizard and common frog.

== Gallery ==
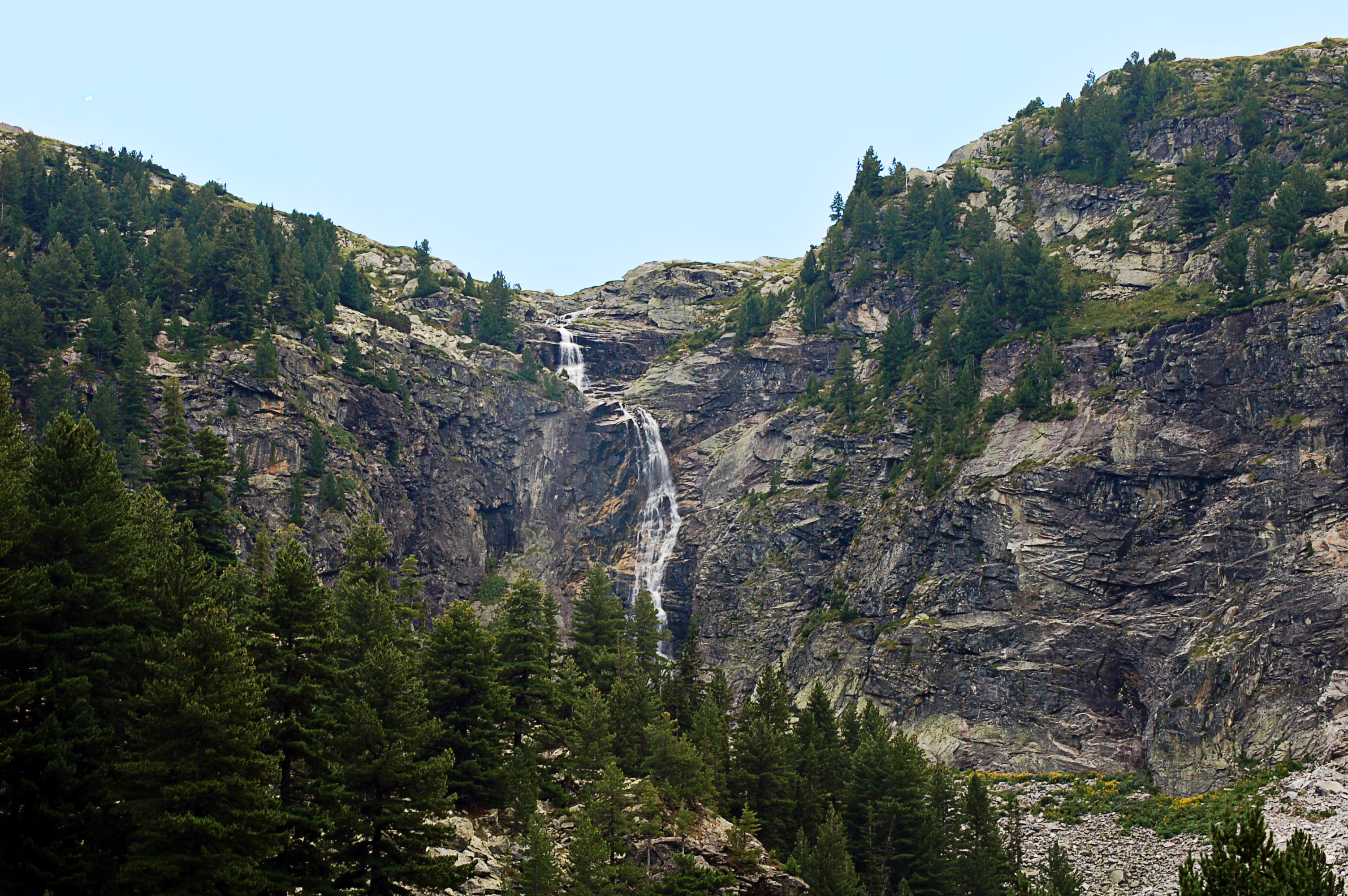
Skakavitsa Waterfall

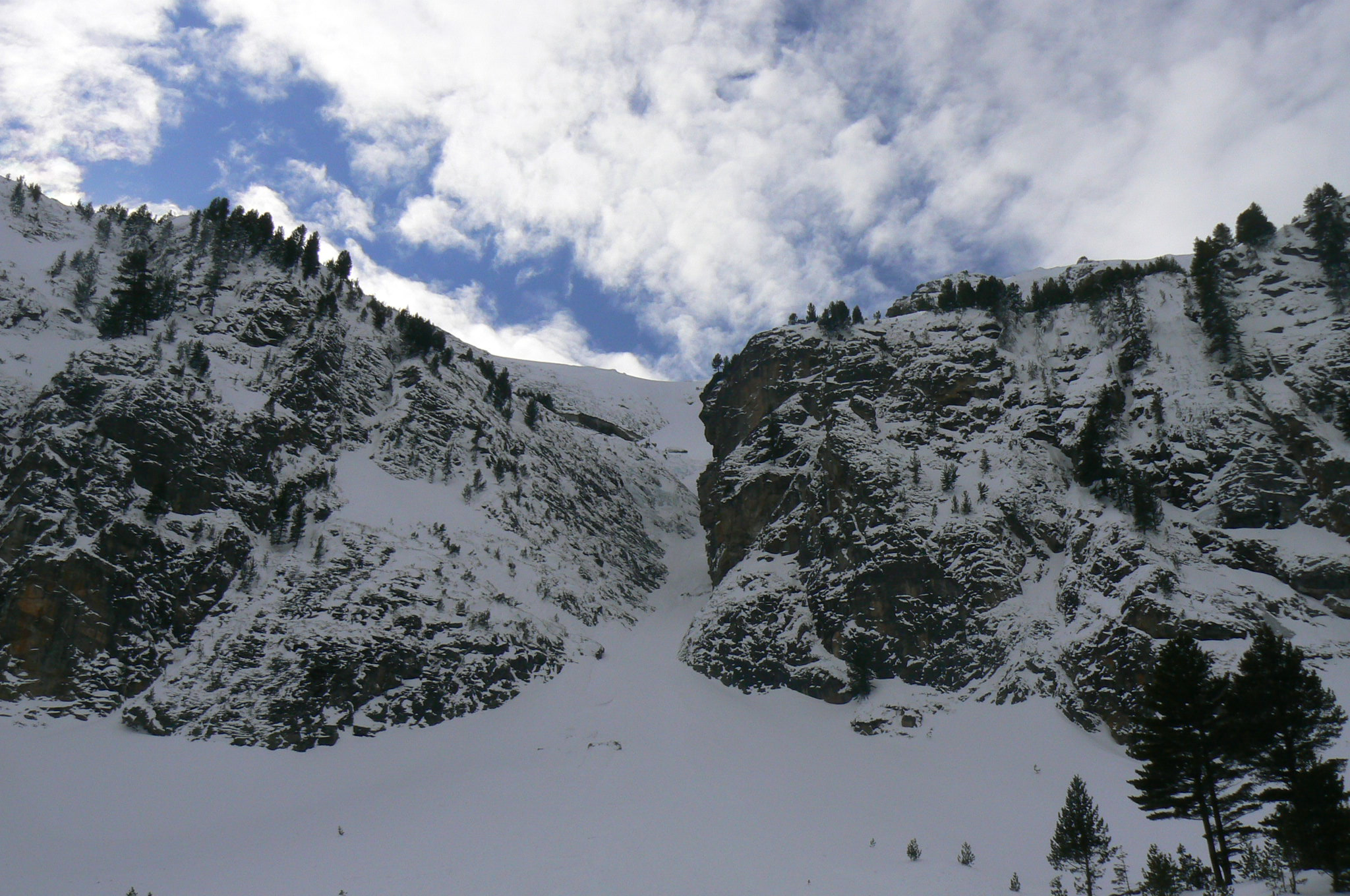
Skakavitsa in winter

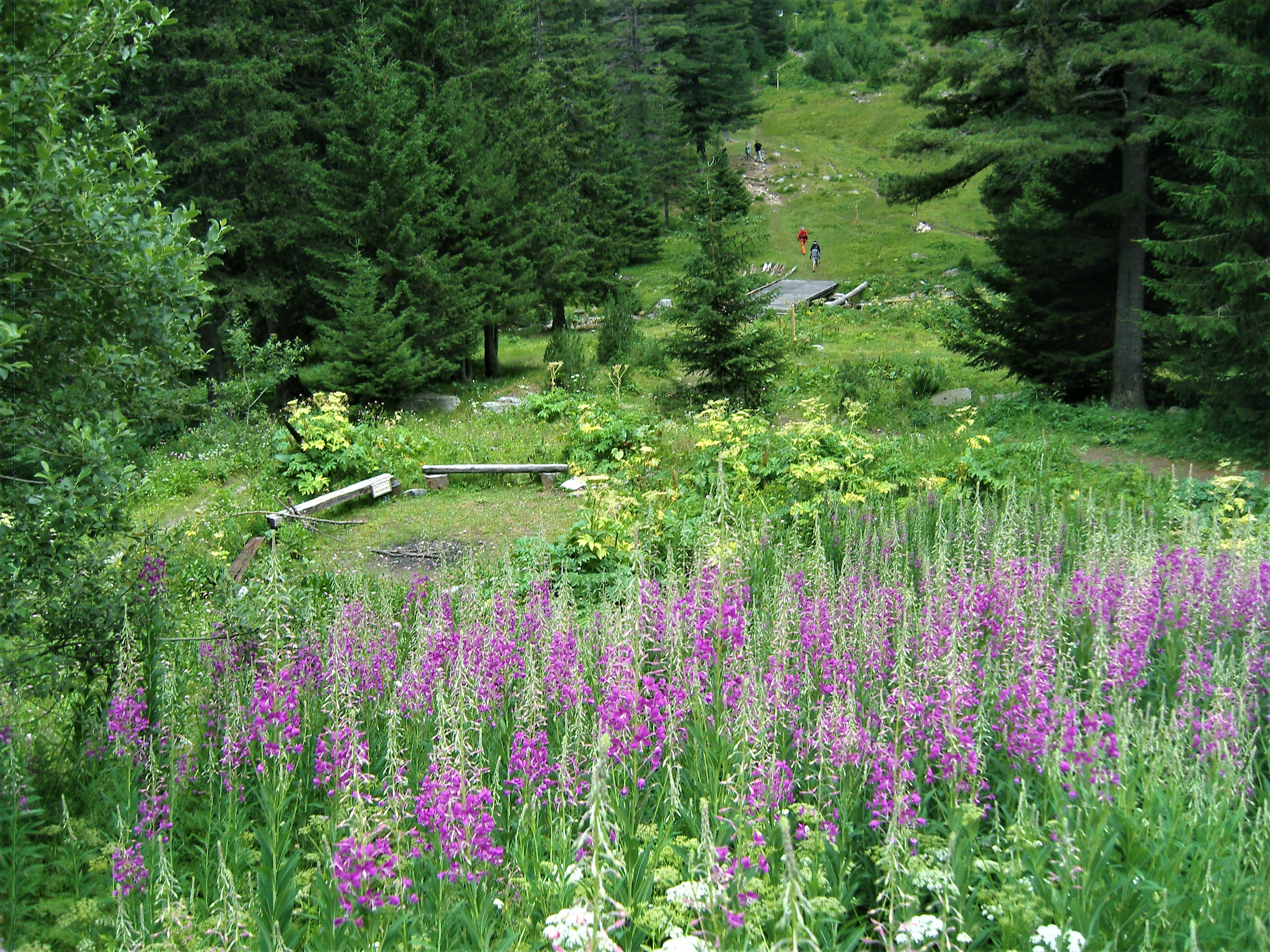
Flora of Skakavitsa

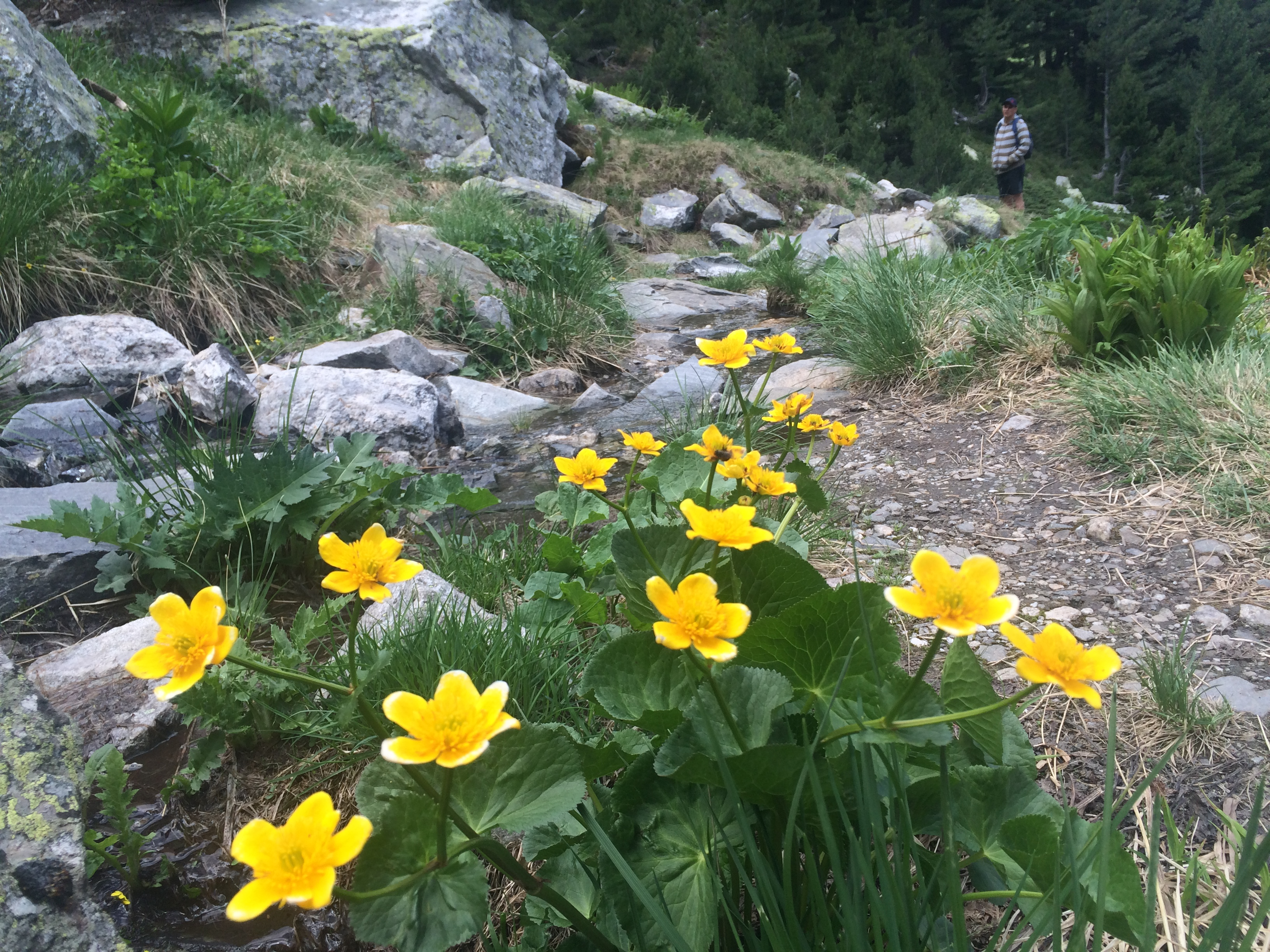
Flora of Skakavitsa
