= Riviera, Varna Province =

Seaside resort in Bulgaria

Coordinates: 43°16′30″N 28°2′30″E

Riviera Holiday Club is a Bulgarian Black Sea resort located 17 km north-east of the city of Varna, on E-87 international road, and at 27 km from Varna Airport. It is also near the Golden Sands resort, both resorts are within minutes walking from each other.
