= Parangalitsa =

Nature reserve in Bulgaria

Parangalitsa Nature Reserve
- IUCN category Ia (strict nature reserve)
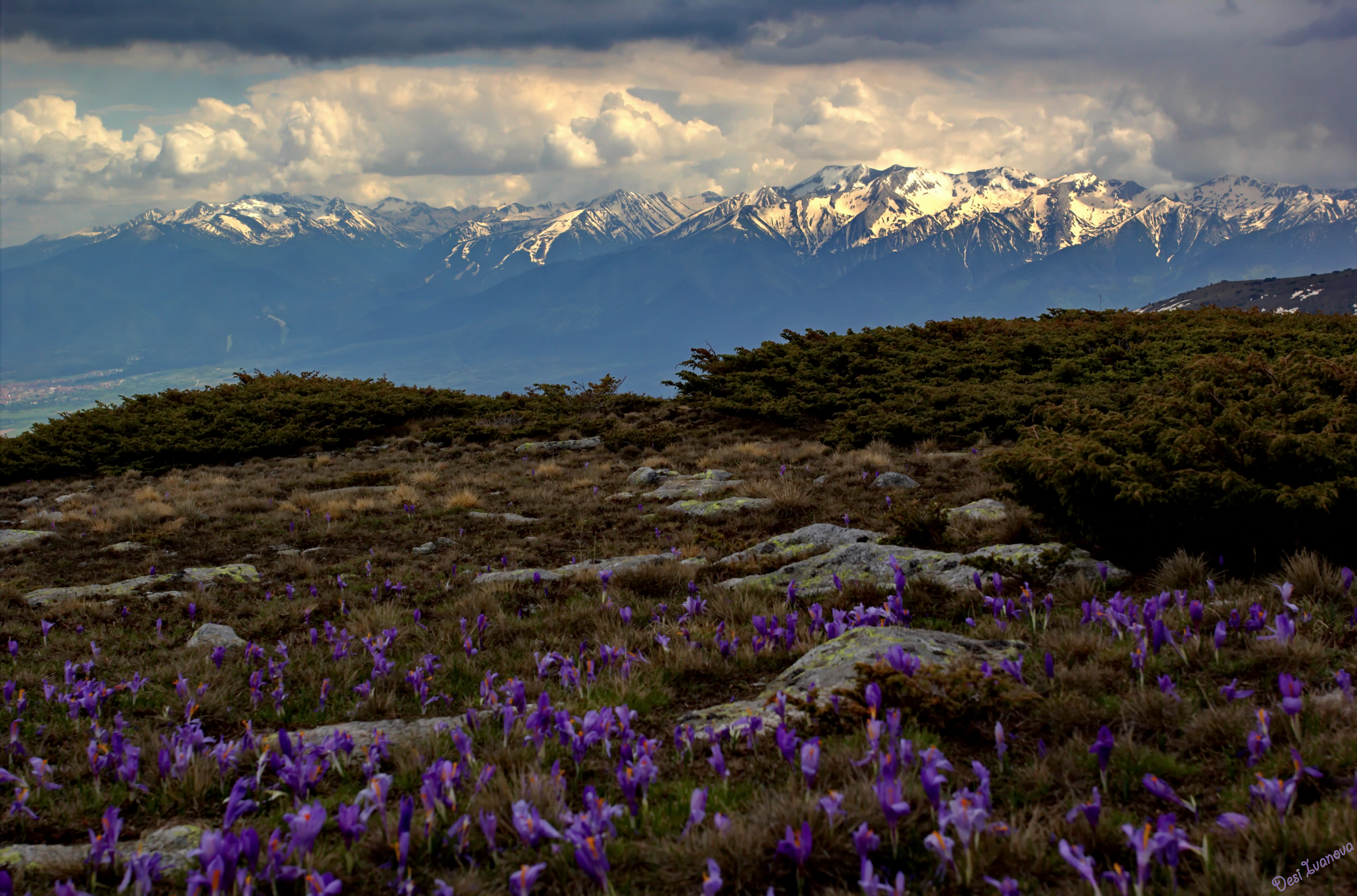

- Location within Bulgaria
- Location: Blagoevgrad Municipality, Blagoevgrad Province, Bulgaria
- Nearest city: Razlog, Belitsa
- Coordinates: 42°01′17″N 23°24′29″E
- Area: 14.87 km^{2} (5.74 sq mi)
- Established: 1933
- Governing body: Ministry of Environment and Water

Parangalitsa (Bulgarian: Парангалица), also spelled Parangalitza, is a nature reserve in Rila National Park, located in the Rila mountain range in southwestern Bulgaria. Parangalitsa is the nation's second oldest protected area, declared in July 1933 to protect undisturbed primary forests, particularly of Norway spruce (Picea abies) and several pine species. Its original area was 1509 ha or 15,09 km^{2} and following several adjustments in 1961 and 2020, it currently spans a territory of 1487 ha or 14,87 km^{2}. It was declared a UNESCO Biosphere Reserve in 1977. Parangalitsa is a strict nature reserve (1st category protected territory according to Bulgarian legislation and IUCN classification) and in it are allowed only scientific research, education and passing through the reserve only on marked trails.

Parangalitsa is situated in southwestern Rila in the valley of the river Blagoevgradska Bistritsa between 1,480 and 2,485 m altitude. Geologically it is dominated by gneiss and granite-gneiss. Administratively, it is part of Blagoevgrad Municipality, Blagoevgrad Province, within the area of the village of Bistritsa.

== Flora ==
The two main habitats are primary undisturbed forests and sub-alpine and alpine vegetation. The areas between 1,750 and 2,000 m altitude are covered with old growth forests of Norway spruce (Picea abies) and Macedonian pine (Pinus peuce) forming some of the oldest conifer woods in Bulgaria and Europe, 150–350 years. Some of the spruces reach height of up to 62 m. At lower altitudes there are mixed forests of Norway spruce, European silver fir (Abies alba) and European beech (Fagus sylvatica). Over 2,000 m are the zones of dwarf mountain pine (Pinus mugo) and alpine meadows. The flora is represented by more than 290 species of vascular plants. Some of the rare and endemic plants are Aquilegia aurea, Geum bulgaricum, Primula deorum, Jacobaea pancicii, Alchemilla catachnoa, Gentiana lutea, Gentiana punctata, Lilium jankae and Trollius europaeus.

== Fauna ==
The fauna is diverse, with many rare mammals and birds. Important conservation species include brown bear, gray wolf, red fox, European pine marten, European wildcat, chamois, red deer, wild boar, red squirrel, western capercaillie, golden eagle, hazel grouse, etc. Reptilians and fish are represented by species adapted to high altitudes, such as common European viper, viviparous lizard and river trout.
