= Blagoevgradska Bistritsa =

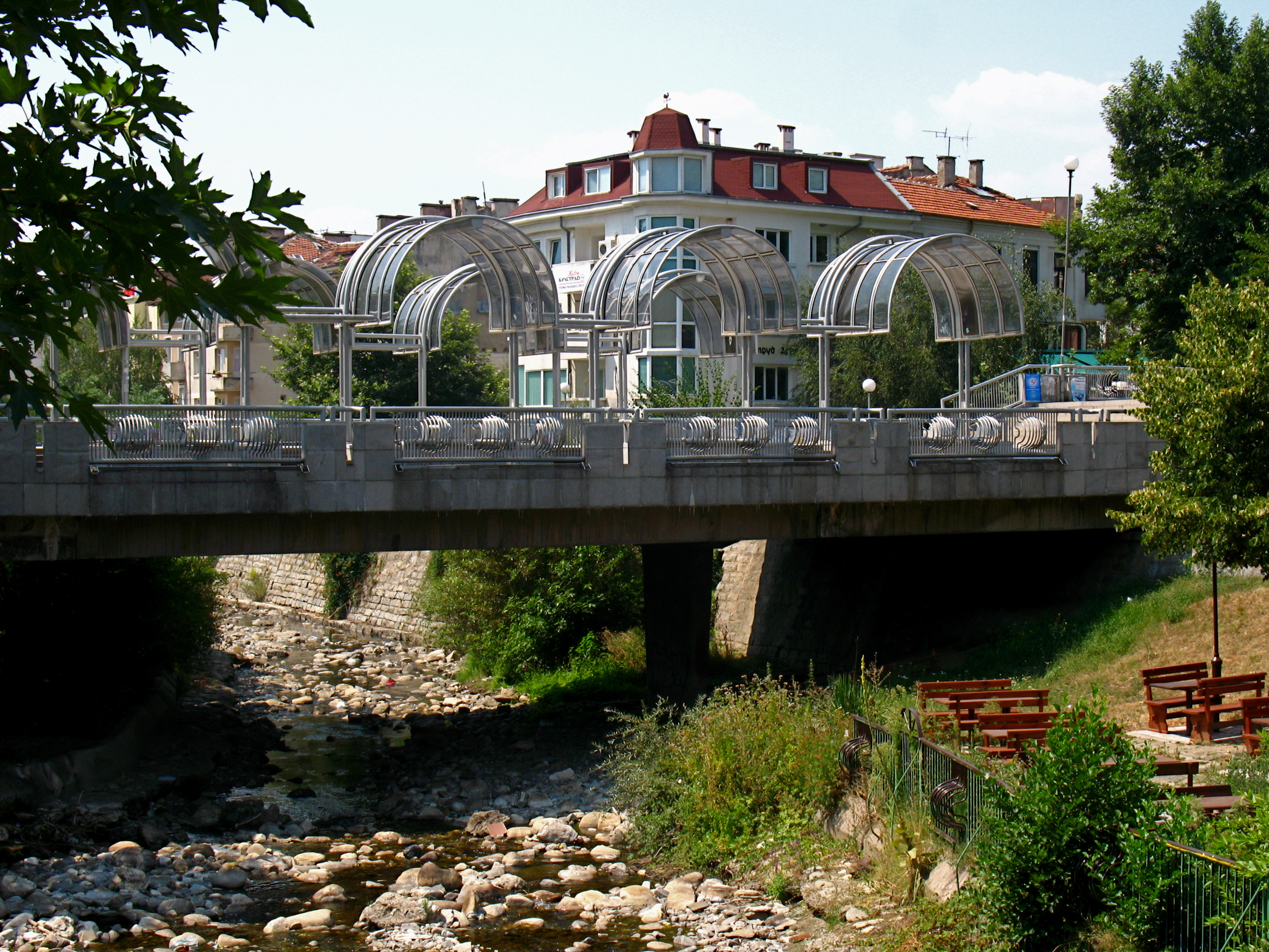

Location
- Country: Bulgaria

Physical characteristics
- Source
  - location: Rila
  - elevation: 2,546 m (8,353 ft)
- Mouth
  - location: Struma River
  - coordinates: 41°59′17.88″N 23°4′9.84″E
  - elevation: 321 m (1,053 ft)
- Length: 41 km (25 mi)
- Basin size: 234 km^{2} (90 sq mi)

Basin features
- Progression: Struma→ Aegean Sea

The Blagoevgradska Bistritsa (Bulgarian: Благоевградска Бистрица) is a river in south-western Bulgaria, a left tributary of the Struma. It is 41 km (approx. 25 mi) long and drains the southwestern parts of the Rila mountain range.

== Geography ==
Blagoevgradska Bistritsa takes its source about 300 m (984 ft) southeast of the summit Golyan Mechi Vrah (2,617 m) in southwestern Rila at an altitude of 2,546 m (8353 ft). It initially flows a mountain stream south to Macedonia refuge, where it turns west in a deep valley covered with old-growth coniferous forests where trees reach heights of almost 60 m and protected within Parangalitsa biosphere reserve.

The river then continues to flow westwards in a deep steep valley until the village of Bistritsa, where it takes a turn to the southwest through an eroded valley. Then it forms a large alluvial cone, on which the city of Blagoevgrad is situated, and flows into the Struma at an altitude of 321 m (1053 ft), in Blagoevgrad's neighbourhood Strumsko.

Its catchment area covers a territory of 234 km² (90 mi²) and represents 1.35% of Struma's total drainage basin. The largest tributary is Slavova Reka. Blagoevgradska Bistritsa has predominantly snow-rain feed with high water in late spring and early summer (May–June) and low water in winter (February). The average annual flow is 3.17 m^{3}/s at the mouth and 2.96 m^{3}/s at Bistritsa.

There are two settlements along the river — the city of Blagoevgrad and the village of Bistritsa, both in Blagoevgrad Province. Its waters in the lower reaches are used for irrigation. Common fish species in the river include brown trout, Struma barbel and European chub.
