= Orelyak =

Peak in south-western Bulgaria

Orelyak (Ореляк)
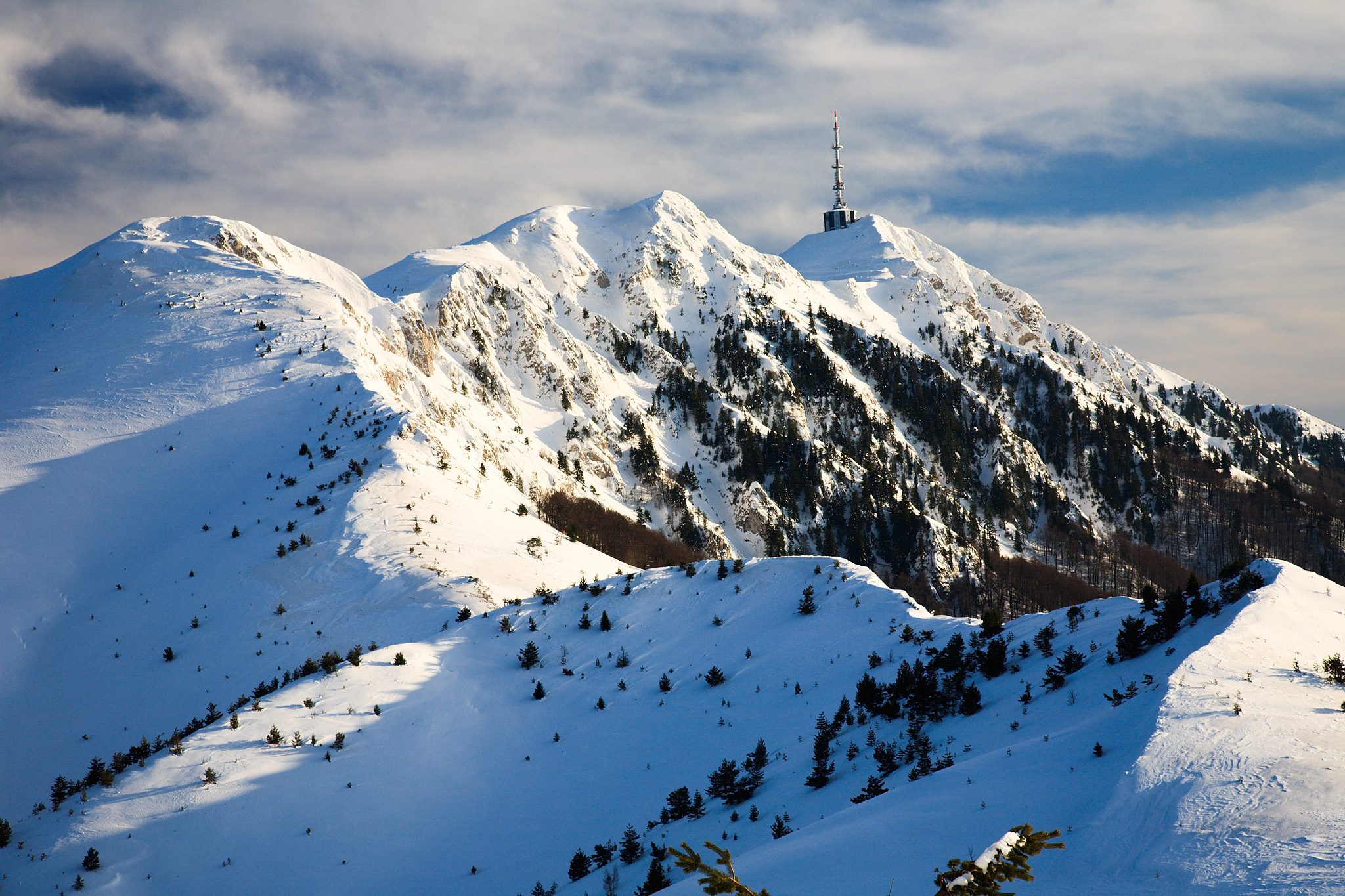
- A view of Orelyak in winter

Highest point
- Elevation: 2,099 m (6,886 ft)
- Coordinates: 41°34′13.99″N 23°36′46.38″E

Geography
- Location: Blagoevgrad Province, Bulgaria
- Parent range: Pirin Mountains

Orelyak (Bulgarian: Ореляк), also known as Orelek or Orlovi skali, is a peak in the Pirin mountain range, south-western Bulgaria. Reaching height of 2,099 m, it is the highest summit of Central Pirin, the second-highest subdivision of the mountain range. Orelayk is situated on Pirin's main ridge to the north of the Baba Peak and to the north-west of the Chala Peak. It has the shape of a triangular dome. The western slopes descend steeply, at places vertically, to the valley of the Pirinska Bistritsa river. Orelayk is built up of karstified marbles. Near its highest point is located a 96 m-high radio and television repeater. The lower part of the northern slopes falls within the territory of the Orelyak Reserve, created to protect the old growth beech forests of Central Pirin.

The main starting point for climbing Orelyak is the Popovi Livadi refuge. There is a marked trail, through which the peak may be reached for about 2 hours. A 10 km gravel road beginning from the same refuge leads to the very top of Orelyak.

== Gallery ==
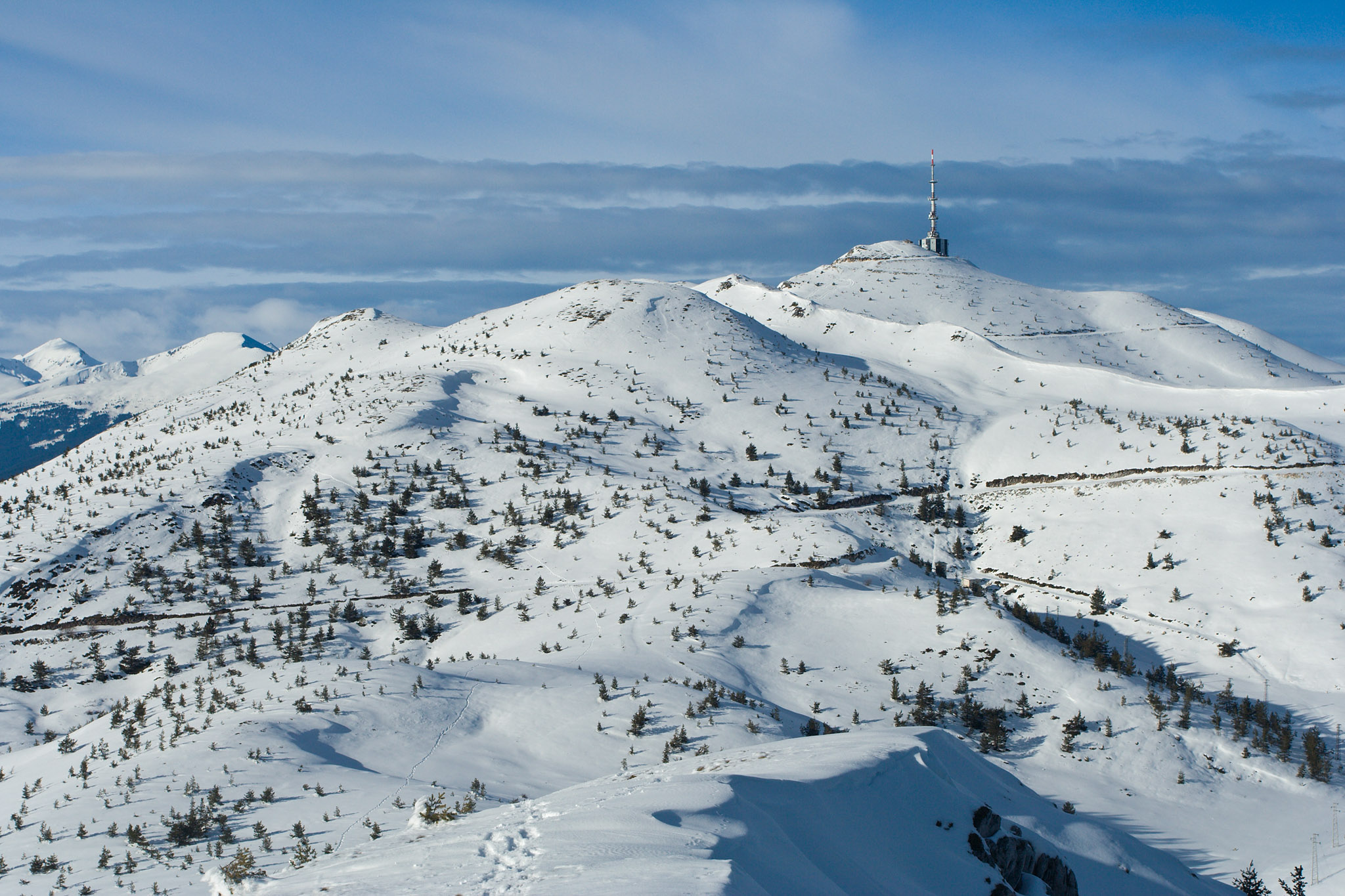

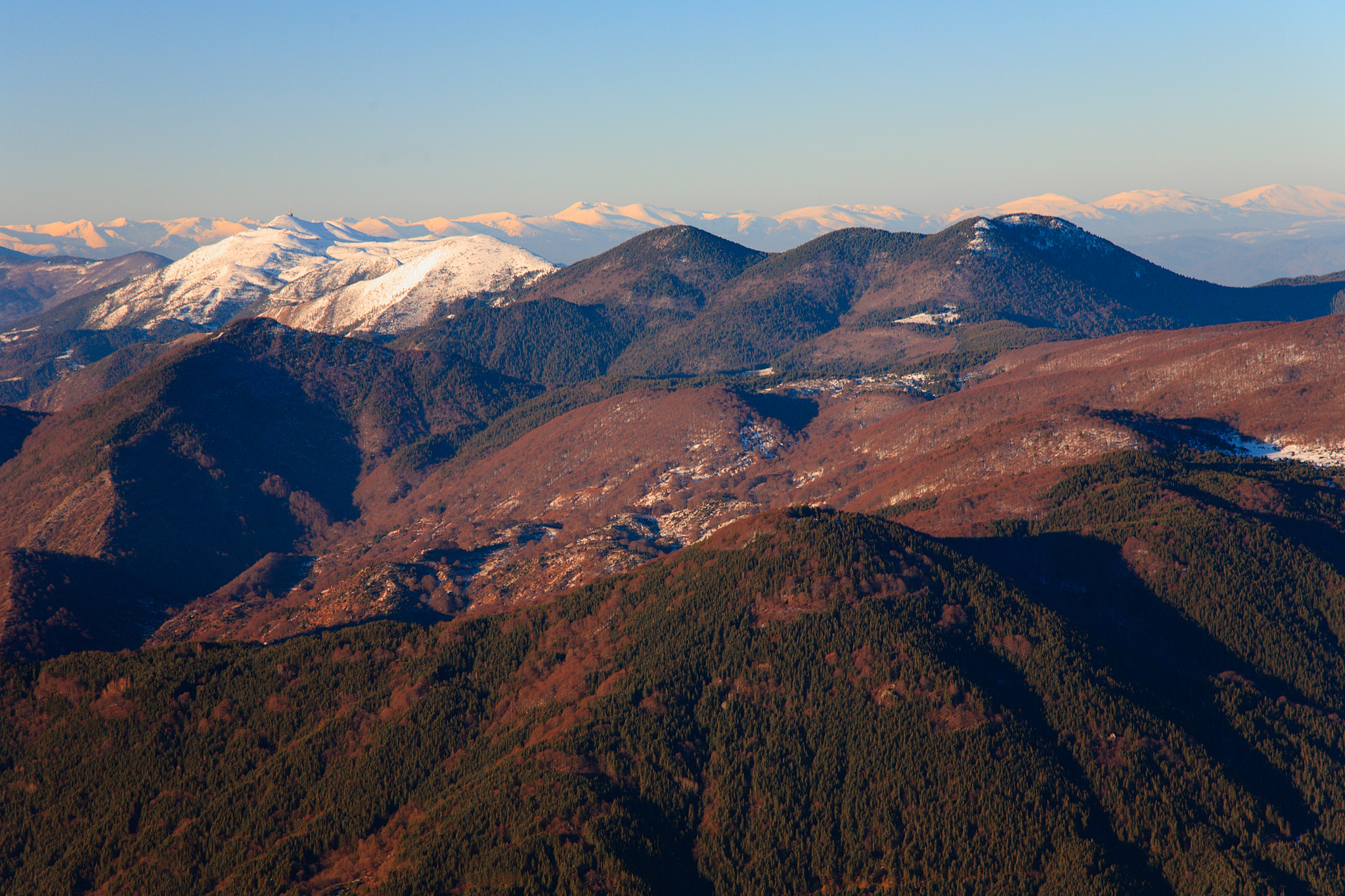

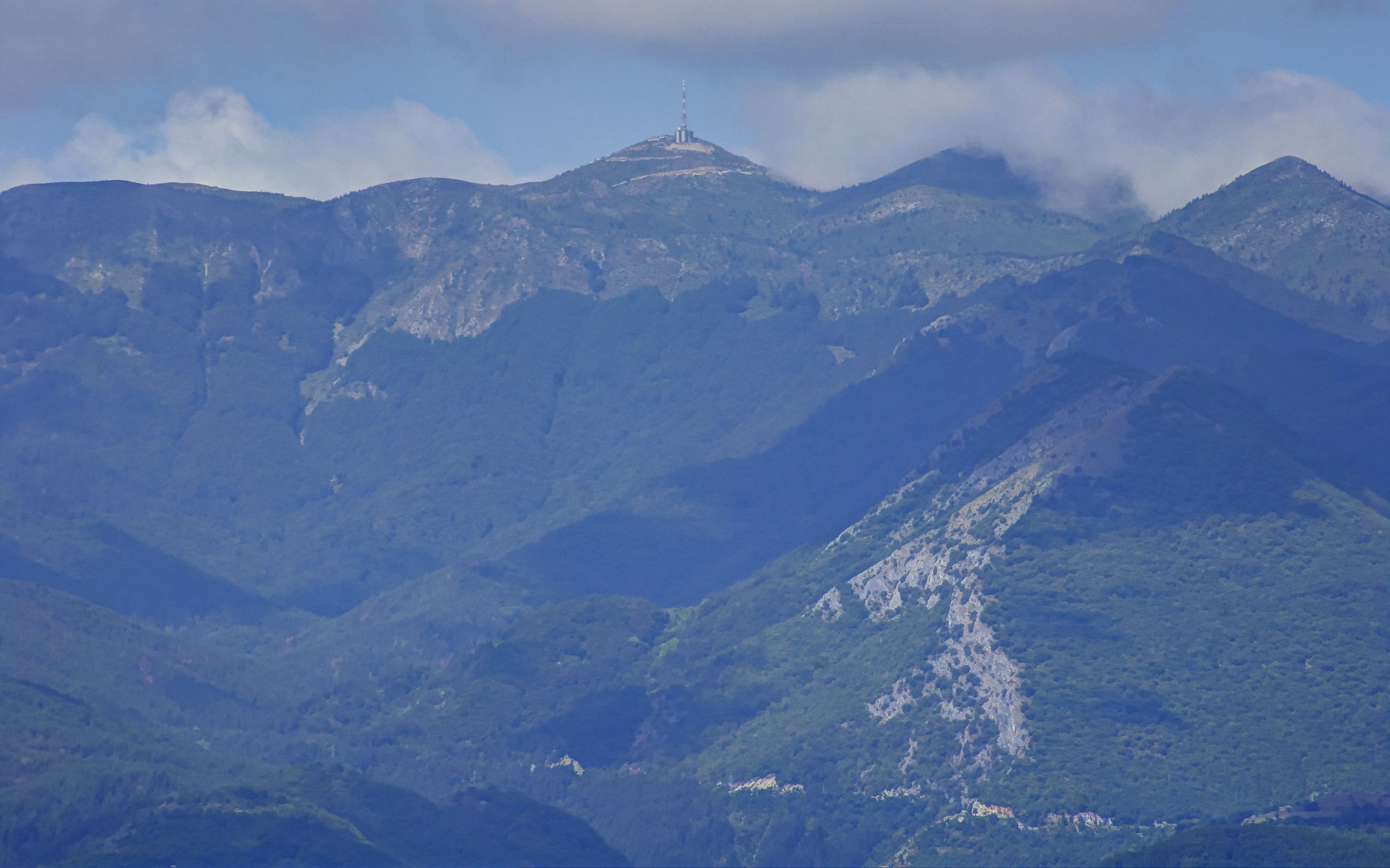

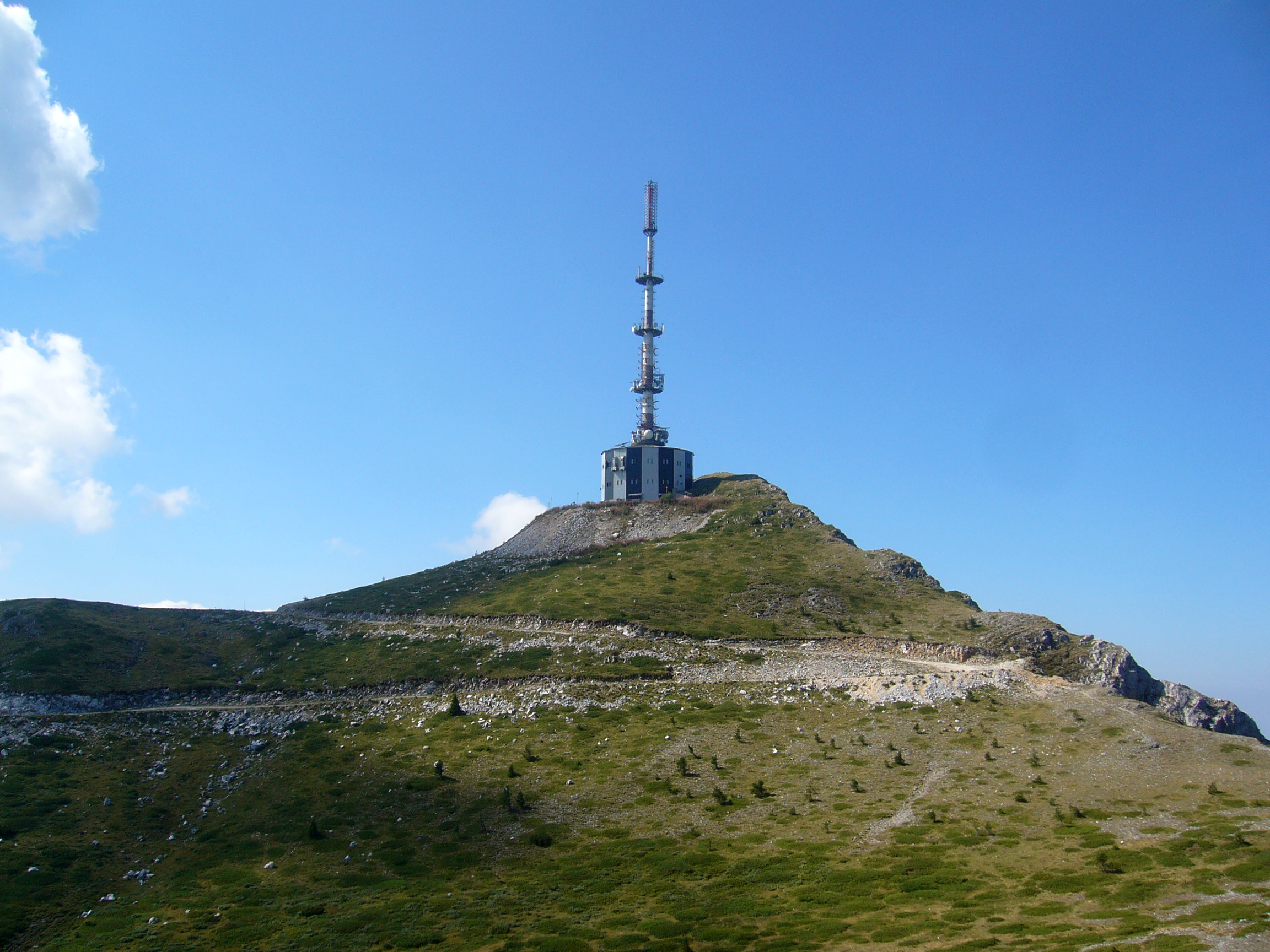
