= Panichishte =

Bulgarian resort

Coordinates: 42°15′41″N 23°17′42″E

Panichishte (Bulgarian: Паничище [pɐˈnit͡ʃiʃtɛ]) is a resort in Bulgaria. It is located in Rila Mountain, 3 km (10 km by car) southeast of Sapareva Banya Town and not far from Dupnitsa Town. At 1,350 meters above sea level, it lies on the border of Rila National Park. Not only it is a ski resort with sport center for various sport, but it is a spa resort too.

In 2009 an aerial lift was built to avoid a dangerous steep section of a route from and to Seven Rila Lakes. Travel time between terminals is 16 minutes.

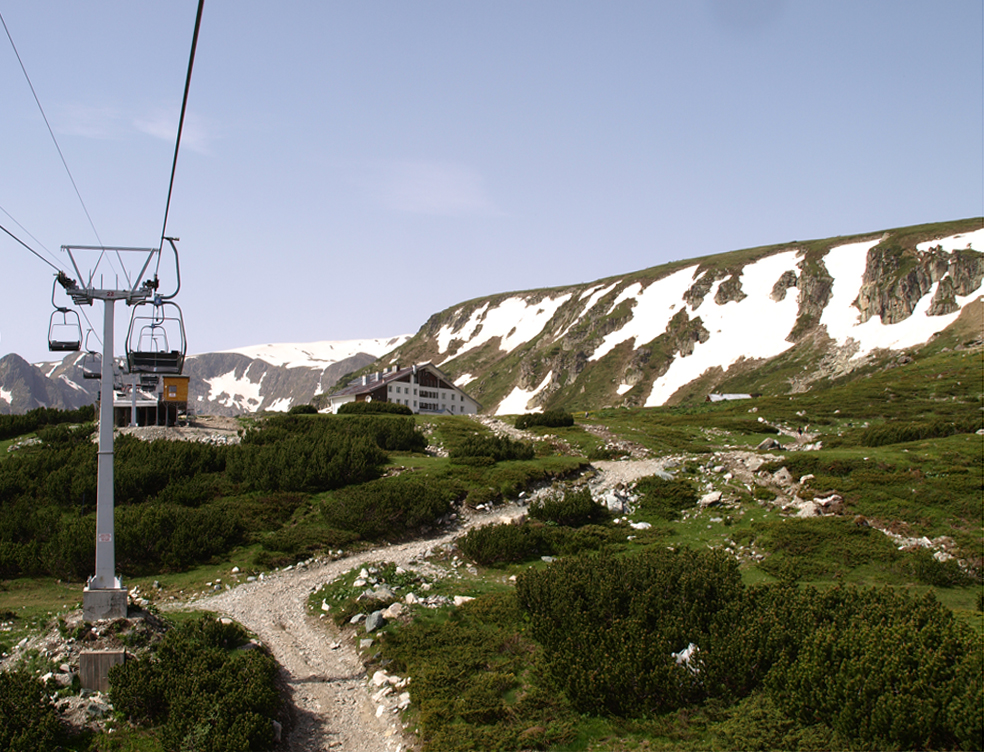
Panichishte Lift and Rila Lakes
