= Skakavitsa Waterfall =

Skakavitsa
- Скакавица
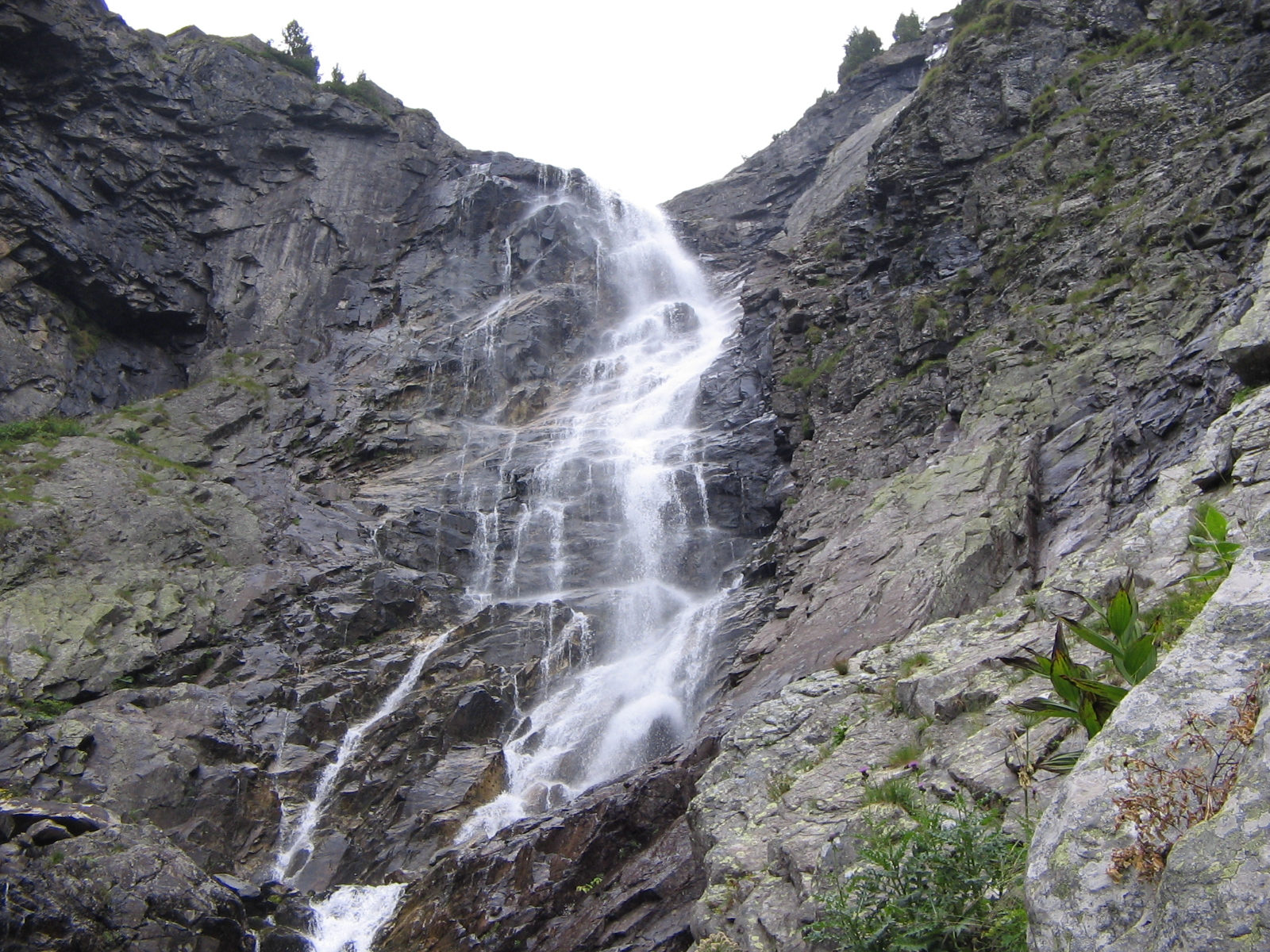

- Location within Bulgaria
- Location: Rila Mountains, Bulgaria
- Coordinates: 42°13′18″N 23°18′17″E
- Type: Plunge
- Total height: 70
- Number of drops: 1

The Skakavitsa Waterfall (Bulgarian: Скакавица or Скакавишки водопад, Skakavishki vodopad) is the highest waterfall in the Rila Mountains in Bulgaria. It is part of Rila National Park and is located on the Skakavitsa River. The waterfall is situated on approximately 2,000 m above sea level, the water falling down from 70 m.

The Skakavitsa Waterfall is one of the main tourist attractions in the area owing also to the century-old endemic Macedonian pine (Pinus peuce) forests surrounding it.

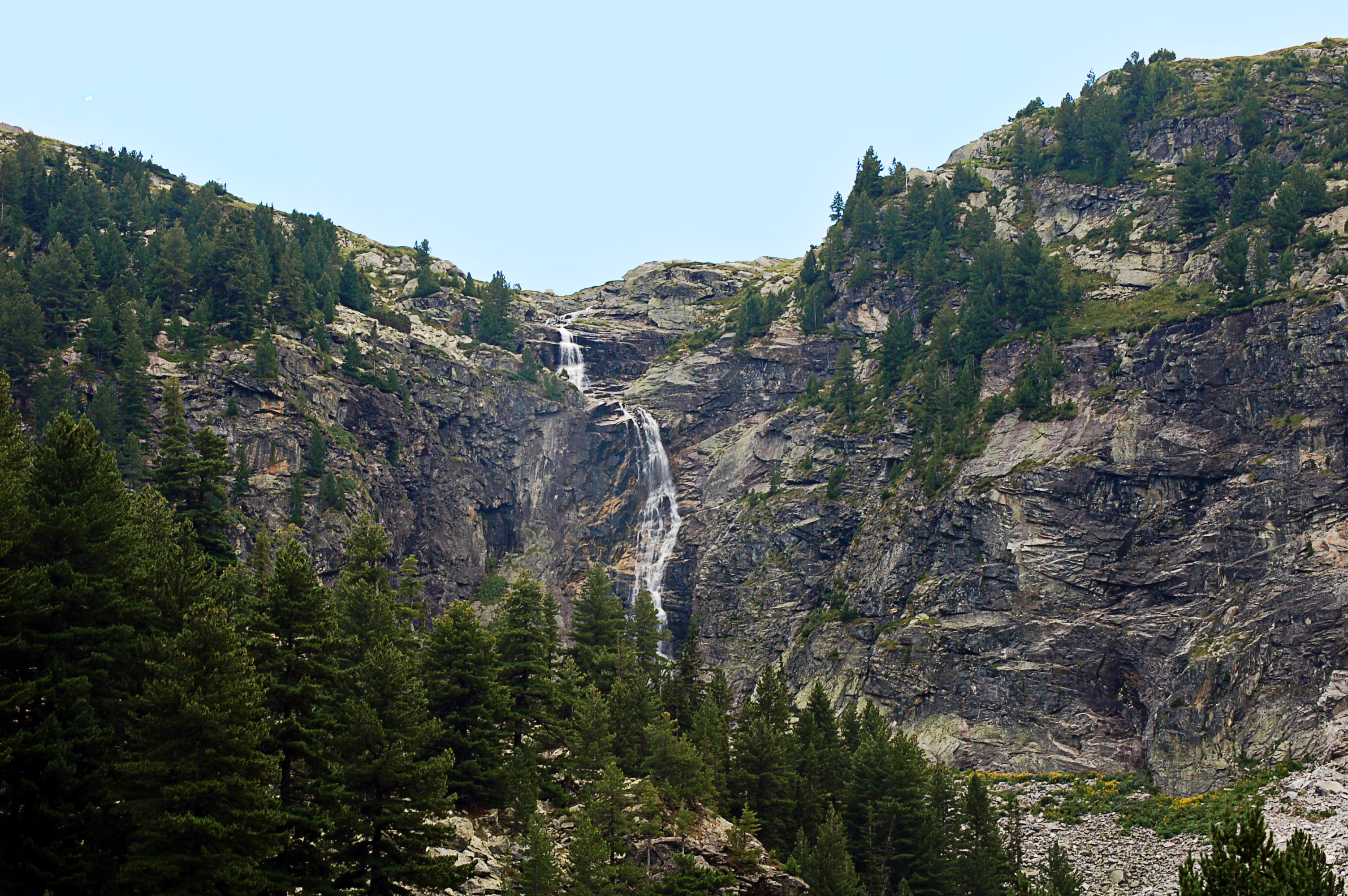

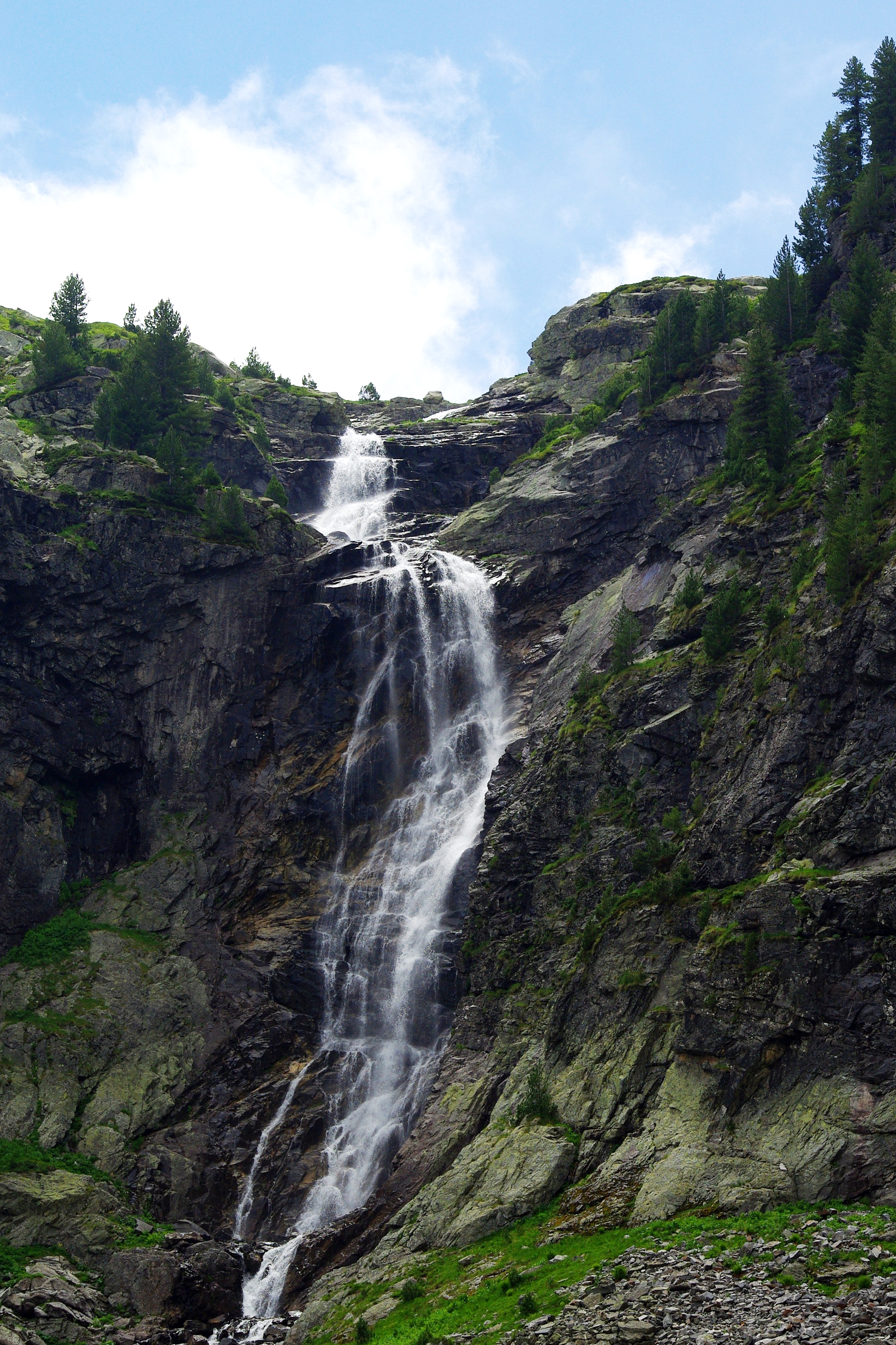

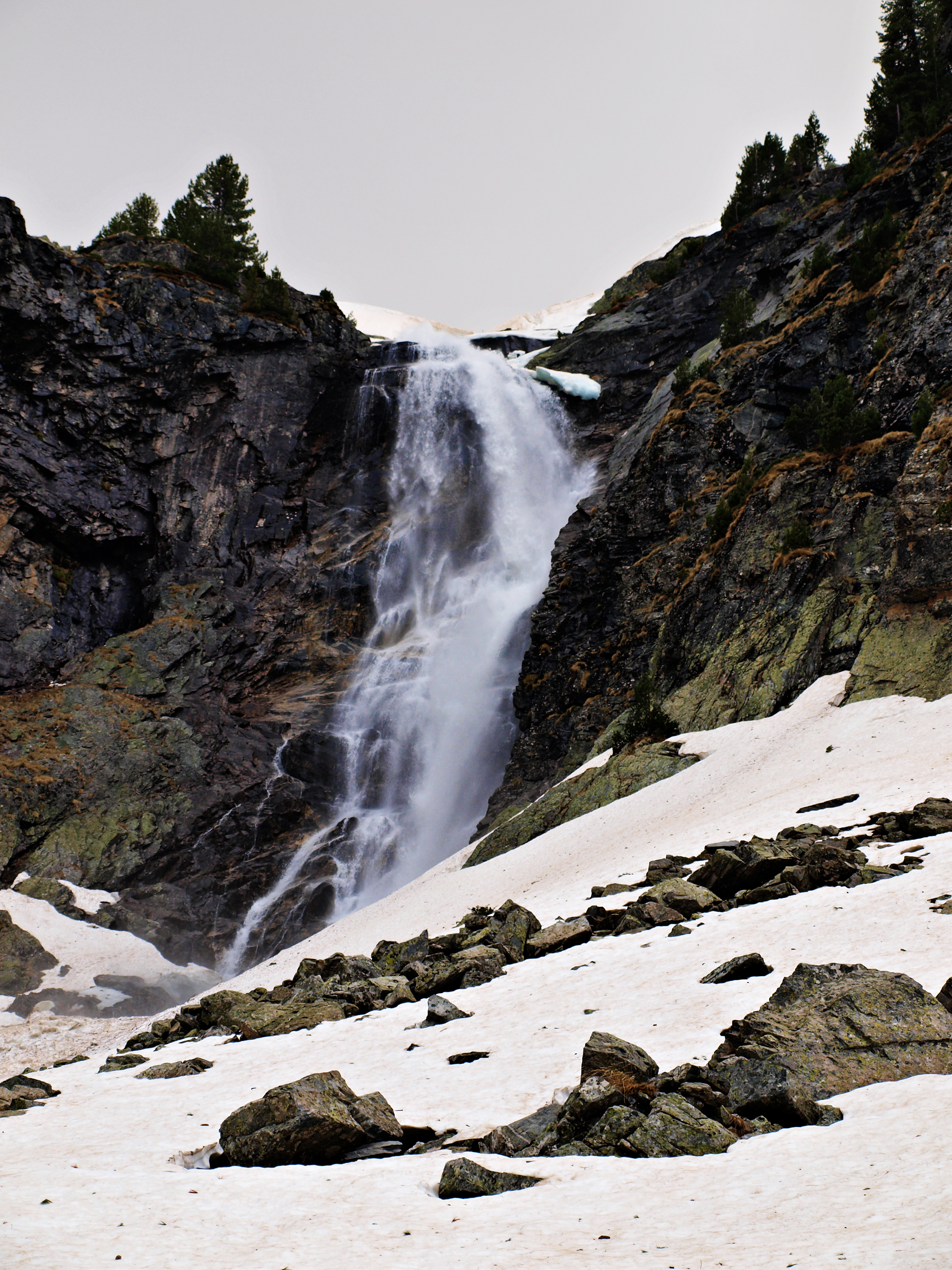

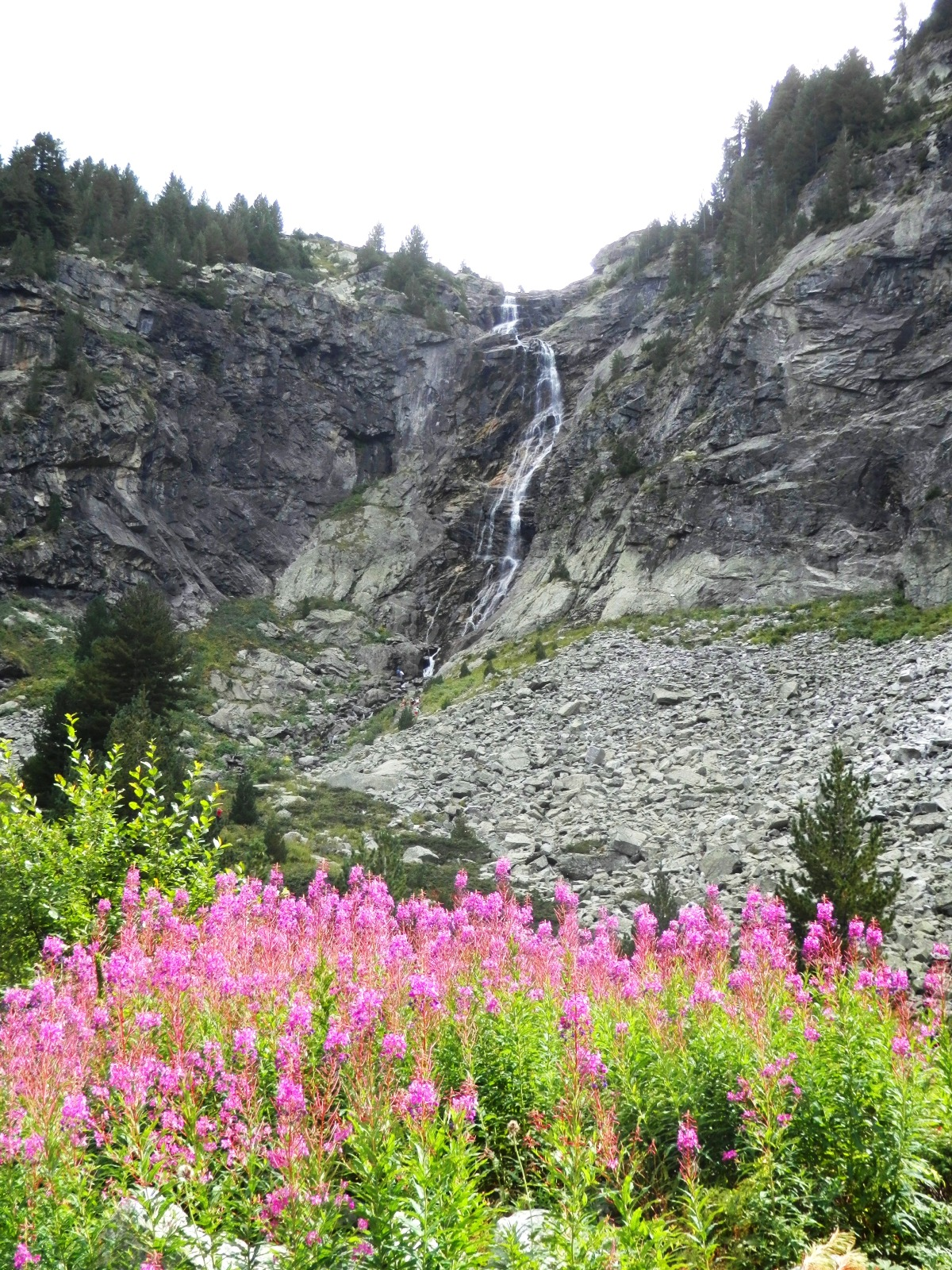

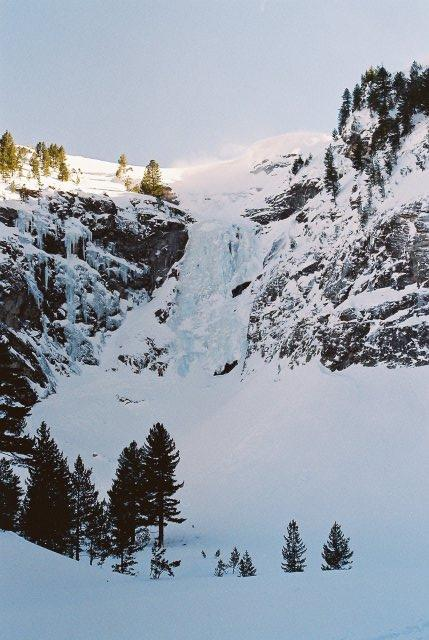

== Honour ==
Skakavitsa Peak on Graham Land in Antarctica is named after the Skakavitsa nature site.

== See also ==
- List of waterfalls
