= Orelyak Reserve =

Orelyak Nature Reserve
- IUCN category Ia (strict nature reserve)
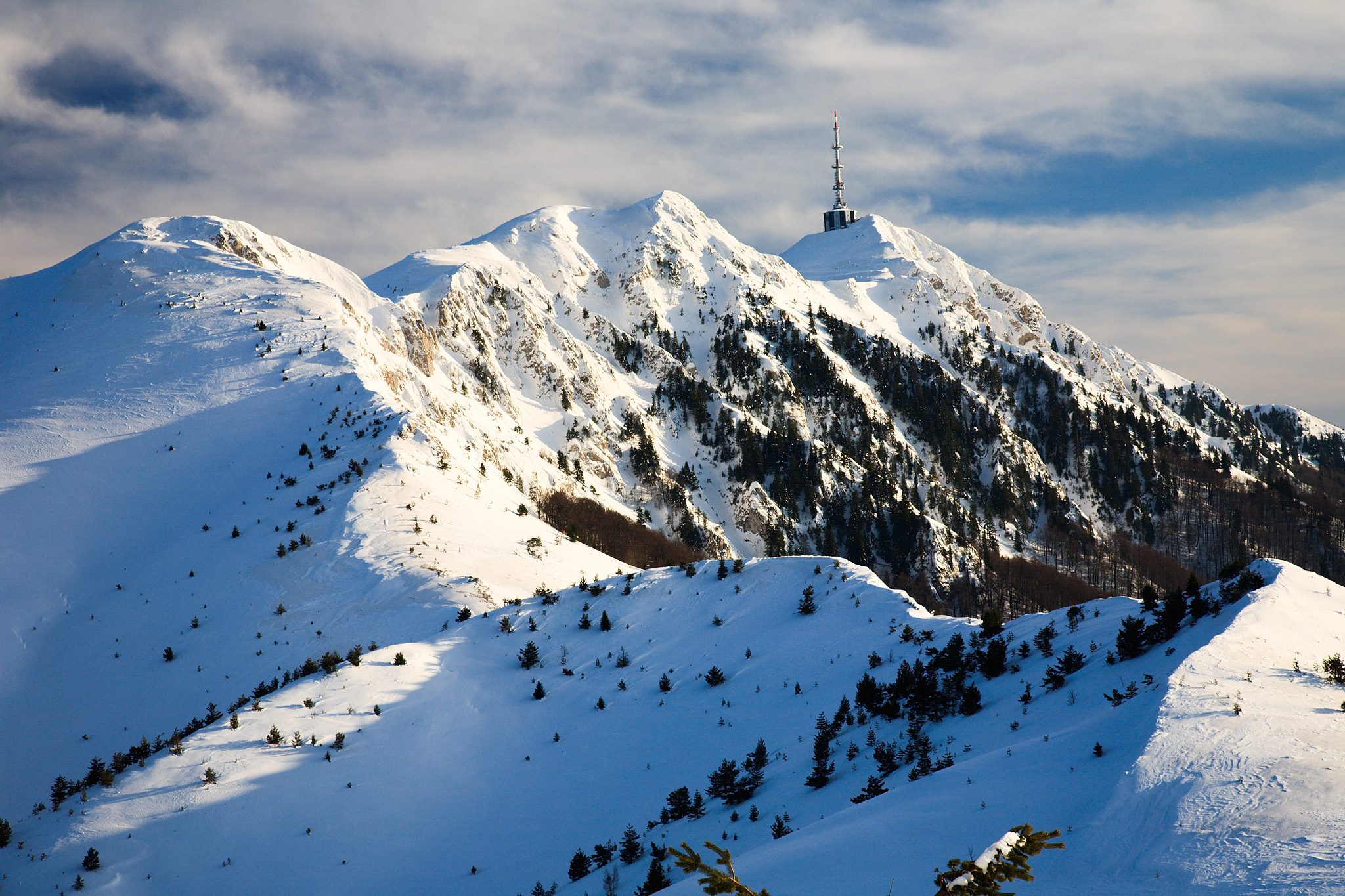

- Location within Bulgaria
- Location: Gotse Delchev Municipality, Blagoevgrad Province, Bulgaria
- Nearest city: Gotse Delchev
- Coordinates: 41°34′12.36″N 23°36′46″E
- Area: 7.57 km^{2} (2.92 sq mi)
- Established: 22 February 1985
- Governing body: Ministry of Environment and Water

Orelyak (Bulgarian: Ореляк) is a nature reserve in the central section of the Pirin mountain range in south-western Bulgaria. It is situated in Gotse Delchev Municipality, Blagoevgrad Province. It was declared on 22 February 1985 to protect old growth beech forests it the vicinities of Mount Orelyak (2,099 m), the highest summit in Central Pirin. It spans a territory of 757 ha or 7.57 km^{2}.

== Geographic overview ==
The border of the reserve follows the main mountain ridge to the north of Mount Orelayk; the ridge itself is within the reserve's buffer zone. The easternmost section is situated in the valley of the Lazhnichka river, a tributary to the Marevo river. Orelyak reserve is situated at an altitude between 900 m and 1800 m. The rock base is formed of marbles. The climate is continental Mediterranean and Alpine at higher altitude.

== Flora ==
The forests of European beech (Fagus sylvatica) are of greatest conservation importance. Their average age is over 150 years and despite being old growth, the forests have remained extremely dense. In the lower parts of the reserve the beech forests have been replaced by the other deciduous trees like European hop-hornbeam (Ostrya carpinifolia) and South European flowering ash (Fraxinus ornus). In the western sections at about 1700 m altitude there are also small patches of Macedonian pine (Pinus peuce).

Orelyak reserve is home to a number Bulgarian and Balkan endemic herbaceous species, including Pirin tea (Sideritis scardica), Draba scardica, Achillea chrysocoma, Saxifraga ferdinandi-coburgi, Viola grisebachiana, Polygala rhodopaea, Arabis ferdinandi-coburgii, Thymus perinicus, etc.

== Fauna ==
Despite the small territory of the reserve, the fauna is diverse. Typical animals include brown bear, gray wolf, red fox, wild boar, roe deer, Greek stream frog, fire salamander, etc.
