= Golden Sands =

Golden Sands Златни пясъци Zlatni pyasatsi
- Resort
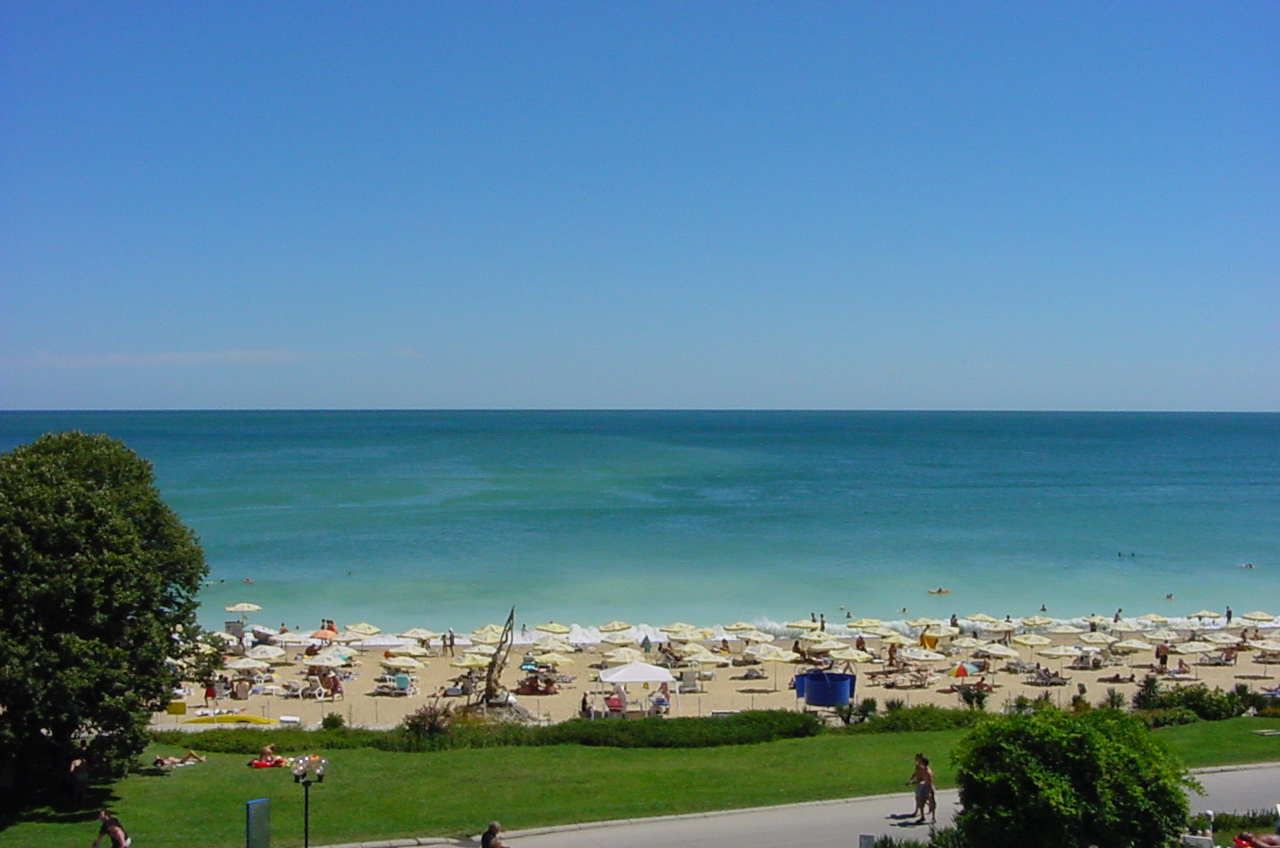

- Location within Bulgaria
- Coordinates: 43.2911076°N 28.0268417°E
- Country: Bulgaria
- Province: Varna
- Municipality: Varna
- Elevation: 24 m (79 ft)
- Time zone: UTC+2 (EET)
  - Summer (DST): UTC+3 (EEST)
- Postal code: 9007
- Area code: +359 52
- Website: www.goldensands.bg

Golden Sands (Bulgarian: Златни пясъци, Zlatni pyasatsi) is a major seaside resort town on the northern Bulgarian Black Sea Coast. Situated 17 kilometres (11 mi) north of downtown Varna, it is administratively part of the Varna Municipality and directly adjacent to the Golden Sands Nature Park.

The resort is known for its fine golden quartz sand, mineral springs, and coastal forest landscape, making it one of the largest tourist destinations on the Black Sea.

== History ==
=== Antiquity and Middle Ages ===
The coastal strip and the slopes of the Franga Plateau have been inhabited since antiquity. Archaeological excavations along the plateau edges have revealed the remains of late Roman and early Byzantine fortifications (known historically as Gerania), dating from the 4th to 7th centuries AD, alongside early Christian basilicas.

During the Middle Ages, the limestone cliffs 3 kilometres (1.9 mi) west of the coast hosted the Aladzha Monastery, a cave monastery complex that served as a hesychast spiritual center during the Second Bulgarian Empire.

=== Ottoman period and early modern era ===
Under Ottoman rule, the area was known as Uzun-kum (Turkish for "Long Sands"). It was an unpopulated coastal area covered by dense broadleaf forest, occasionally used by local inhabitants for day trips or shelter.

=== Development as a resort ===
State-planned development of Golden Sands began in 1956 under a master plan led by architect Georgi Ganev. Official construction was launched in August 1957 as part of a national strategy to build international tourist infrastructure along the Black Sea coast.

The initial phase focused on low-rise hotel developments integrated into the natural forest terrain. Following the end of the socialist era, the resort underwent privatization in the late 1990s and early 2000s, leading to modern tourist facilities and upgraded hotel infrastructure.

== Geography and climate ==
Golden Sands is situated along a coastal basin beneath the Franga Plateau. The primary beach stretches for approximately 3.5 kilometres (2.2 mi) and reaches widths of up to 100 metres (330 ft). The coastline features fine quartz sand and natural thermal mineral springs issuing from deep aquifers, which are utilized for local spa facilities.

Climate

The region experiences a humid subtropical climate (Köppen Cfa) with strong maritime influences. Summers are warm and sunny, moderated by sea breezes, with average daily temperatures ranging between 27–30 °C (81–86 °F).

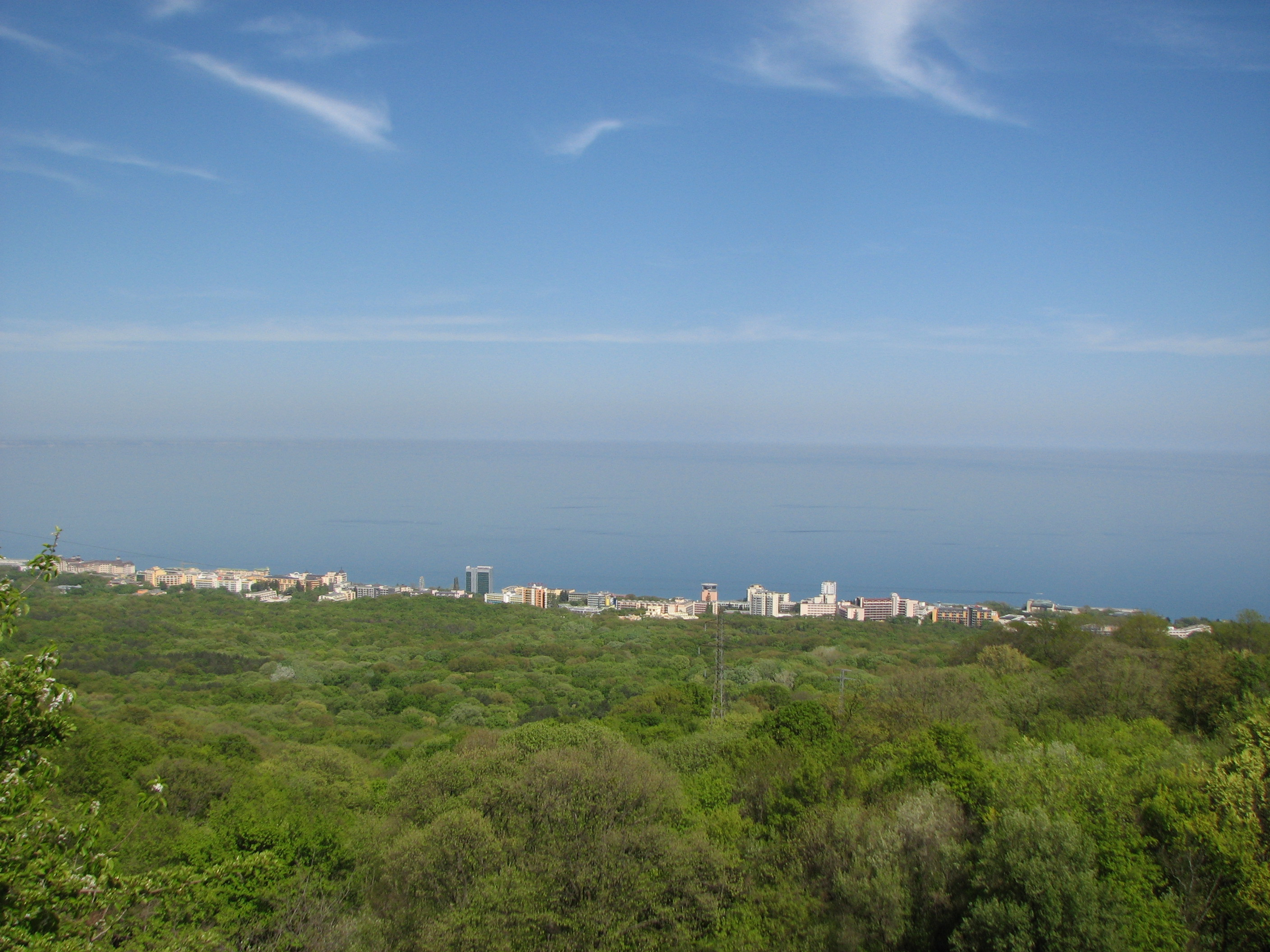
The coast around Golden Sands with the neighbouring nature park in the foreground

== Landmarks and attractions ==
- Aladzha Monastery: A medieval Orthodox cave monastery complex located 3 km west of the beach within the nature park, carved directly into a 40-meter limestone cliff.
- Sanctuary of Veles: A historic ritual site and pagan sanctuary located within the protected forest trails of the Nature Park, dedicated to the Slavic deity Veles.
- Chapel of St. John the Baptist: An Orthodox chapel situated near the seafront promenade, representing traditional Bulgarian religious architecture.
- Golden Sands Nature Park: A state-protected area established in 1943 covering 1,320 hectares of ancient broadleaf forest with a network of marked hiking routes and natural thermal springs.

== Beach zones ==
In addition to the main commercial beach areas lined with hotel infrastructure, the resort coastline includes specific functional sections:

- Naturist Beach: Located at the northern section of the coast toward Panorama and Kranevo, Golden Sands features one of the most well-known clothing-optional and nudist beaches on the Bulgarian Black Sea coast.
- Adjacent sub-districts: The resort seamlessly connects with neighboring coastal areas including Riviera and Kabakum.

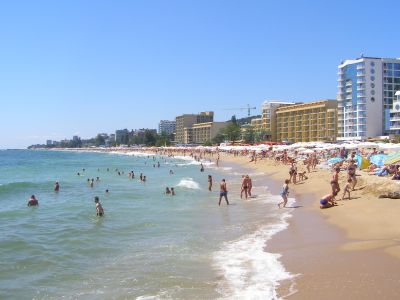
A view of the beach and hotel complexes

== Transport ==
Golden Sands is connected to Varna and the regional road network via the E87 highway.

- Public Transit: The resort is served by Varna municipal bus lines, including line 409 (connecting to Varna International Airport via the city centre) and lines 9, 109, and 209 (connecting to Varna Railway Station and northern residential districts).
- Maritime: A small yacht marina at the northern end of the resort provides berthing for pleasure craft and local excursion boats.

== See also ==
- Varna
- Aladzha Monastery
- Golden Sands Nature Park
- St. Constantine and Helena
