= Ibar Reserve =

Nature reserve in Bulgaria

Ibar Nature Reserve
- IUCN category Ia (strict nature reserve)
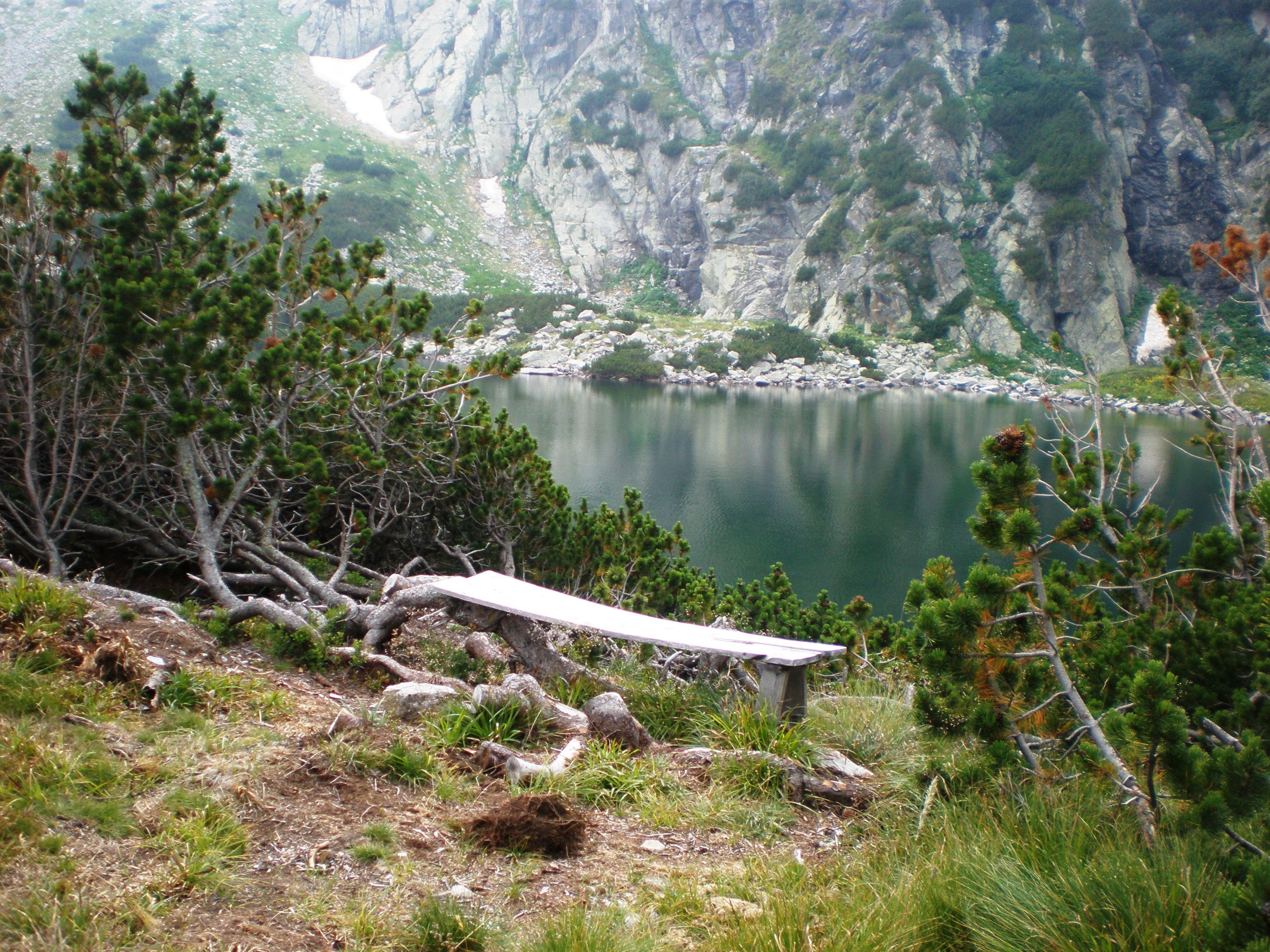

- Location within Bulgaria
- Location: Sofia Province, Bulgaria
- Nearest city: Kostenets, Dolna Banya
- Coordinates: 42°10′20.64″N 23°42′41.4″E
- Area: 22.62 km^{2} (8.73 sq mi)
- Established: 1985
- Governing body: Ministry of Environment and Water

Ibar (Bulgarian: Ибър) is a nature reserve in Rila National Park, located in the Rila mountain range in southwestern Bulgaria. It was declared in February 1985 to protect relict plants and rare animal species. It spans a territory of 2262 ha or 22.62 km^{2}.

== Geography ==
Ibar is situated in northeastern Rila in the upper valleys of several small right tributaries of the river Maritsa. The homonymous summit of Ibar (2,664 m) lies less than a kilometer south of the reserve’s southwesternmost corner, outside of its boundaries. Its southwestern limits reach the summit of Belmeken (2,626 m). Administratively, it is part of the municipalities of Kostenets and Dolna Banya, both in Sofia Province. The closest settlement is the village of Kostenets.

== Flora and fauna ==
There are diverse plant habitats, including alpine meadows and forests. The large populations of dwarf mountain pine (Pinus mugo) in the higher altitude zones are of high conservational importance. There are forests of Scots pine (Pinus sylvestris), Macedonian pine (Pinus peuce), Norway spruce (Picea abies) and European beech (Fagus sylvatica). The flora is represented by over 400 species of vascular plants, rare and endemic taxa, such as Juniperus communis, Rhododendron myrtifolium, Geum bulgaricum, Aquilegia aurea, Gentiana punctata, Campanula transsilvanica, etc.

The fauna is also diverse and includes with a number of rare mammal and bird species of conservational importance, like brown bear, gray wolf, red fox, chamois, roe deer, wild boar, European ground squirrel, European snow vole, golden eagle, Eastern imperial eagle, Eurasian goshawk, rock partridge, horned lark etc.

== Gallery ==
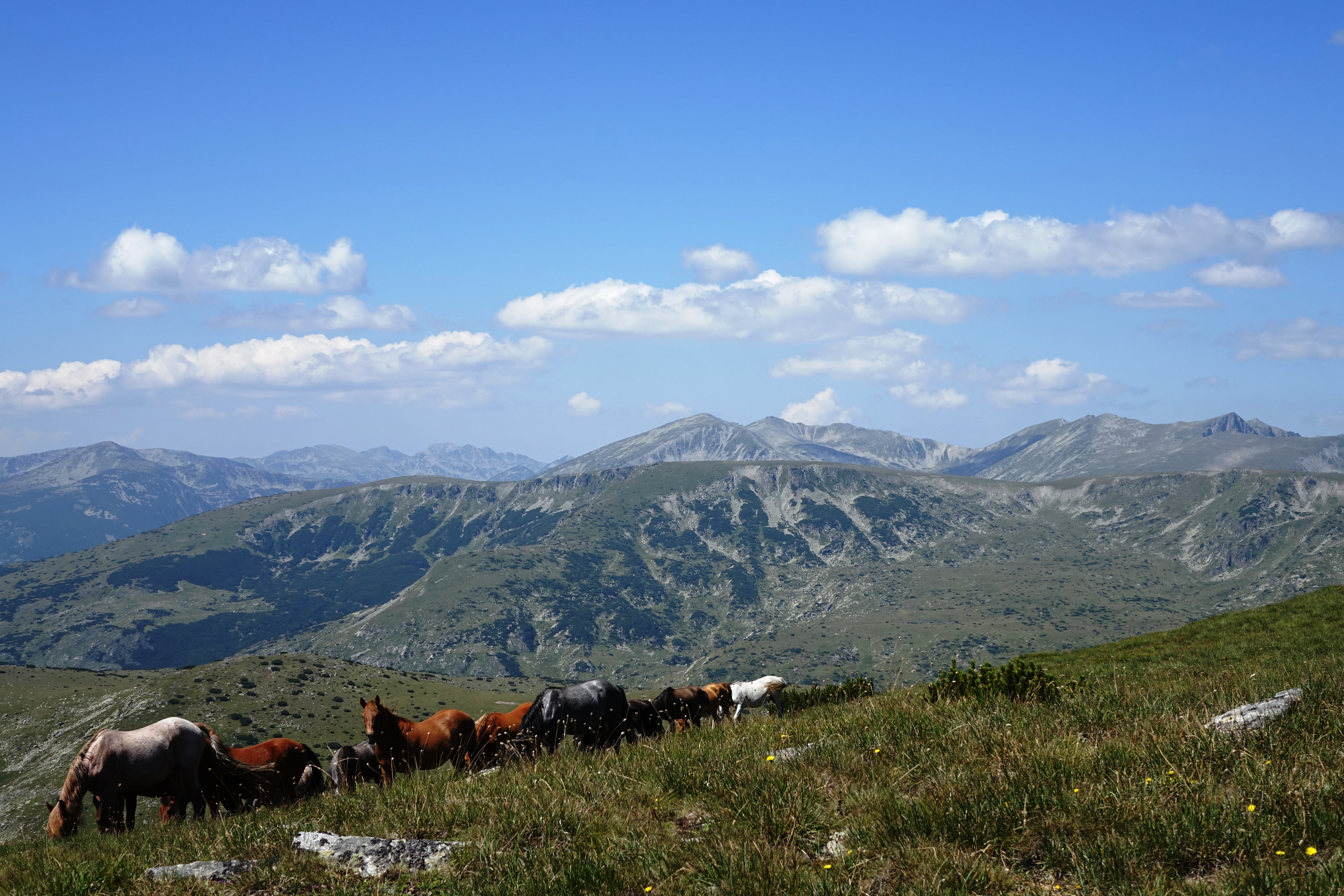
A view from the summit of Ibar

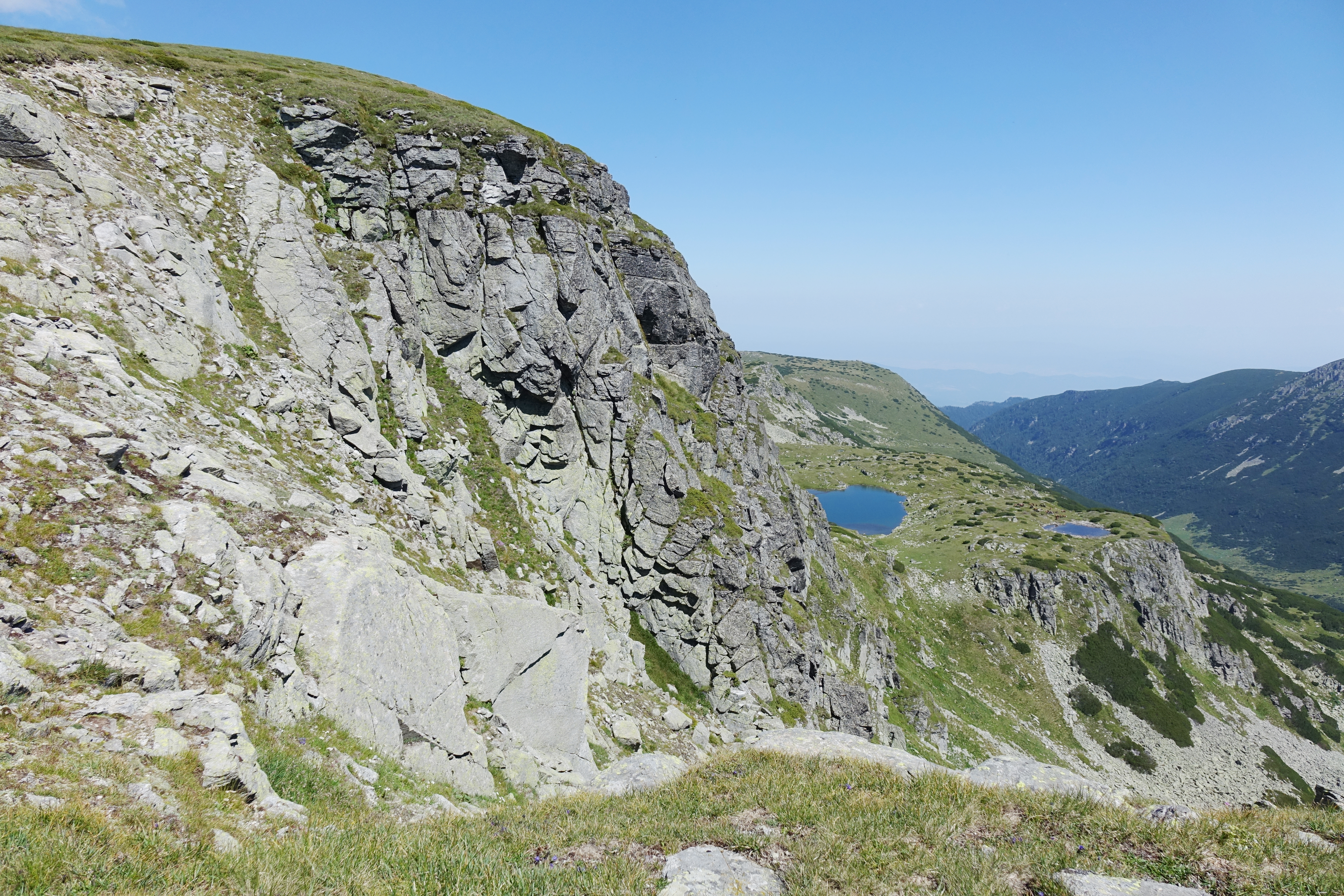
Ibar Lake

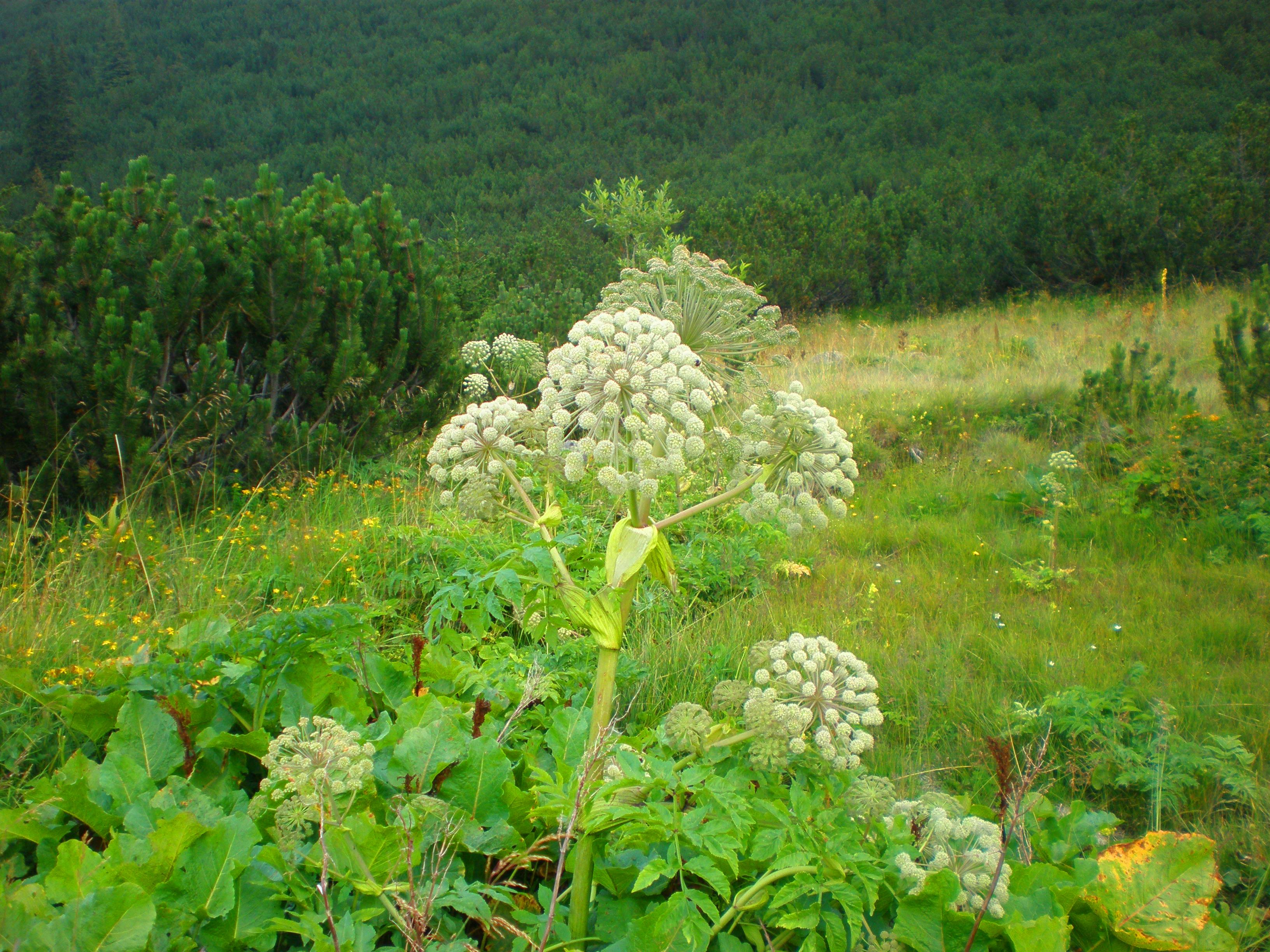
Flora of Ibar
