= Bistritsa, Blagoevgrad Province =

Bistritsa Бистрица
- Village
- Location within Bulgaria
- Coordinates: 42°3′N 23°11′E
- Country: Bulgaria
- Province: Blagoevgrad Province
- Municipality: Blagoevgrad

Government
  - Mayor: Georgi Bochukov (GERB)

Area
  - Total: 171.498 km^{2} (66.216 sq mi)
- Elevation: 893 m (2,930 ft)

Population (31-12-2020)
  - Total: 76
- Time zone: UTC+2 (EET)
  - Summer (DST): UTC+3 (EEST)
- Postal Code: 2724
- Area code: 073

Bistritsa is a sparsely inhabited mountainous dispersed village in Blagoevgrad Municipality, in Blagoevgrad Province, Bulgaria. The village consists of 42 neighborhoods. It is situated in Rila mountain 9 kilometers east of Blagoevgrad. The Bistritsa river flows through the village.

== History ==
Оn the territory of today's Bistritsa lived Thracians, before the new era, Romans 1 - 4 century AD, Slavs and Proto-Bulgarians. This is supported by evidence. Some coins minted during the reign of the emperors ( Tiberius, Claudius, Constans and Constantius II) were found in tnear the village. In addition, during excavations around the former summer camp "Septemvriyche" were found late ancient fortress, church, building bricks, stone balls, iron locks, nails, staples. They are dated to the Thracian-Roman era.

== Population ==
By 1900, according to Vasil Kanchov ("Macedonia. Ethnography and Statistics"), the population of the village numbered 1540 people, of whom 1300 were Bulgarian Christians and 240 Vlachs.

Population according to the censuses over the years:

Historical population

Year	Pop.	±%
1934	1,794	—
1946	1,771	−1.3%
1956	1,531	−13.6%
1965	588	−61.6%
1975	291	−50.5%

Year	Pop.	±%
1985	193	−33.7%
1992	172	−10.9%
2001	151	−12.2%
2011	90	−40.4%

Source: NSI

== Economy and transportation ==
Most of the population is not economically active. There aren't any major economical subjects in the village. There is a municipal asphalt road connecting the village with Blagoevgrad, but most of the neighborhoods are connected with unpaved roads.

== Institutions ==
The only institution in the village is the mayor's office. There aren't any educational or medical institutions. The school is not functioning and its building is ruined.

== Religion ==
There are nine Christian Orthodox churches and chapels in Bistrica. St. George's Church dates back to 1861, and John the Baptist Church in the Dabovo area dates back to 1872. St. Demetrius's Church is in the central part of the village and was also built at the end of the 19th century.
