= Golden Sands Nature Park =

Nature park in Varna Province, Bulgaria

- IUCN category V (protected landscape/seascape)
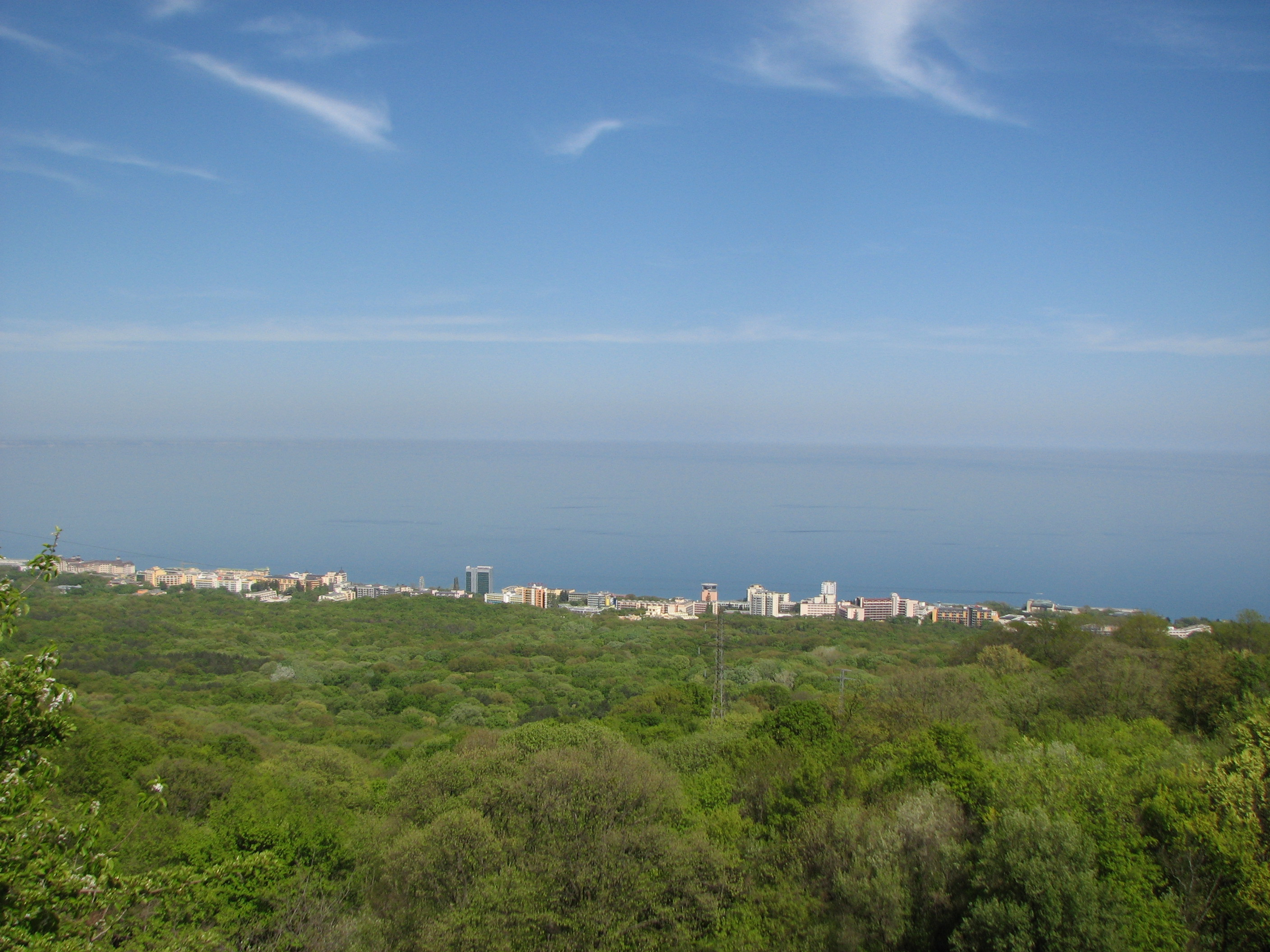
- View of the park with the Golden Sands resort and the Black Sea.
- Interactive map of Golden Sands Nature Park
- Location: Varna Municipality, Varna Province, Bulgaria
- Nearest city: Varna
- Coordinates: 43°18′15″N 28°02′10″E
- Area: 13.2 km^{2} (5.1 sq mi)
- Established: 1943

Golden Sands Nature Park (Bulgarian: Природен парк "Златни пясъци") is a nature park on the Bulgarian Black Sea Coast in Varna Province.

== Geography ==
It covers 13.2 square kilometres (5.1 sq mi). The park is 9.2 km (5.7 mi) long and on the average 1.2 km (0.75 mi) wide; it was declared a protected territory in 1943 (under the name Hachuka State Forest). According to the criteria of the World Conservation Union, it ranks in the fifth category on the list of protected territories.

== Flora ==
The flora of Golden Sands includes a total of 400 plant species. It is covered with deciduous forests consisting of various types of oak species including moss-capped oak, Hungarian oak, swamp white oak, and hornbeam. The park's indigenous vegetation, unlike forests with oak predominance, includes dense forest.

Oaks and the accompanying silver leafed lime, manna ash, yoke elm, and field maple occupy the hilly area in the park's centre. These forests include almost all tree species typical for the local lower forest layer (up to 1,000 m (3,300 ft) above sea level) and some specimens (limes, elms) are over 100 years old. A two-hundred-year-old sycamore with trunk circumference of 4 m (13 ft) is among the landmarks. Among the most typical grassy species are the common mullein, toad flax, and ribwort.

Dense forest ecosystems occupy a smaller and wetter area in the southeast. These are deciduous tree species (Caucasian ash, moss-capped oak, yoke elm, white poplar, Mahaleb cherry) covered with climbing plants: old man's beard, wild vines, ivy, hop, and silk vine. These forests are surprisingly similar to tropical forests. Grasses include wood horsetail, oriental iris, wild orchids, and cuckoo pint.

Shrub ecosystems take up the steep parts of the park in places with thin topsoil layers over limy rockbase. The predominant shrubs are lilac, crown vetch, jasmine, and Christ's thorn. Grasses in these parts are mostly drought-resistant. Some rare species are fernleaf wormwood, field chamomile, and the protected species joint pine. Under protection are 20 other rare and endangered species (snowdrop, Caucasian primula, orchids, etc.)

During its long-term cohabitation with humans the forest changed. Some native vegetation has been replaced by hornbeam brushwood. Another result is the presence of cultured eco-systems. The most common coniferous plants are European black pine, white fir, cypress, and cedar, and of the deciduous - acacia, flowering ash, and white poplar.

== Fauna ==
Two amphibious, 8 reptile, 78 avian and 25 mammal species inhabit the park. The water-covered areas are populated by amphibious species. Among the variety of reptiles, protected species include Aesculapian snake, green whip snake, and tortoise. Of the 78 avian species the most common are blackbirds, thrushes, tits, woodpeckers, jays, and common buzzards. The most common predatory birds are goshawks, eagle owls, and tawny owls. In the water basins nest moorhens and green-headed duck.

Some typical mammals are roe deer, red deer, wild boar, badger, squirrel, beech marten, and rabbit.

There is a great variety of insects. Among the most attractive is the stag beetle, and, in the open areas, butterflies - swallowtail, admiral, small tortoiseshell, etc. Under protection are rare and endangered animal species - 70 avian (common buzzard, goshawk, hawk finch, golden oriole, etc.) and 25 mammal species (including roe deer, wild boar, badger, hedgehog, pine marten, and bats).
