= Govedartsi =

Village in Samokov municipality, Sofia oblast, Bulgaria

Govedartsi Говедарци
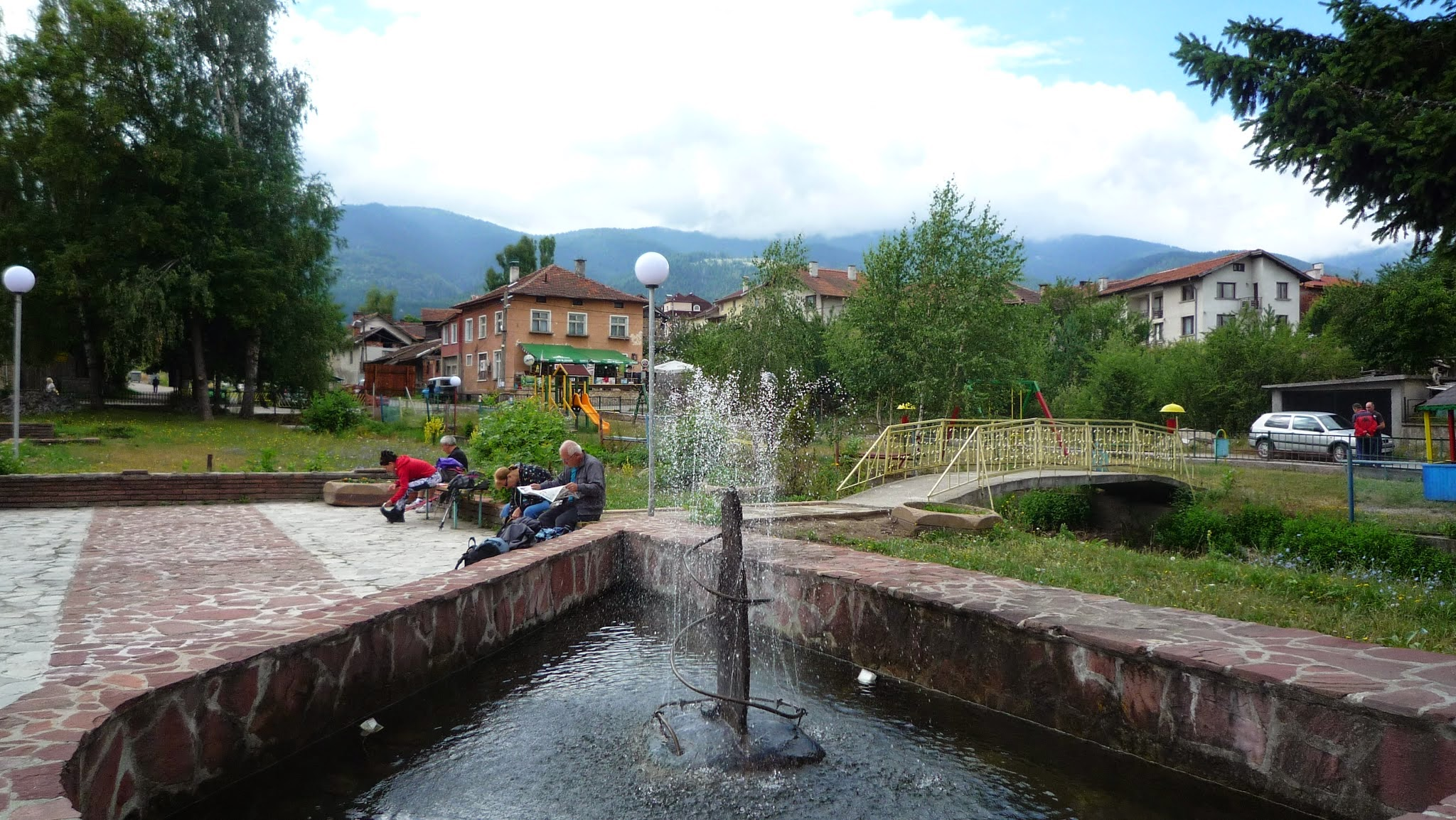

- Location of Govedartsi, Bulgaria
- Coordinates: 42°15′46″N 23°28′41″E
- Country: Bulgaria
- Provinces (Oblast): Sofia Province

Government
  - Mayor: Angel Dzhorgov
- Elevation: 1,157 m (3,796 ft)

Population (2024)
  - Total: 1,163
- Time zone: UTC+2 (EET)
  - Summer (DST): UTC+3 (EEST)
- Postal Code: 2020

Govedartsi (Bulgarian: Говедарци) is a village in Sofia Province of western Bulgaria. As of 2024 its population is 1,163.

== Geography ==
The village is situated at an altitude of 1,157 m in the Govedartsi Valley in the Rila mountain range, nestled between its divisions Northwest Rila to the south and Lakatnishka Rila to the north. The valley is drained by the Cherni Iskar, one of the two main stems of the major river Iskar of the Danube drainage. It lies within the alpine and temperate continental climatic zones. The minimum January temperature is –33.6 °C and the maximum July temperature reaches 30.6 °C. The snow cover may last for 160 days and may reach over 120 cm. The soils are cinnamon and brown forest soils.

Administratively, Govedartsi is part of Samokov Municipality, situated in the southeastern part of Sofia Province. Its territory is 124.474 km^{2}. The closest settlements are the villages of Madzhare and Mala Tsarkva, situated immediately east, being practically adjacent. Some 13-14 km further downstream along the Cherni Iskar is the municipal center Samokov, situated in the homonymous valley. The major ski resort of Borovets is located to the east. The village is accessible via the third class III-6206 that stems from the second class II-62 road Kyustendil–Dupnitsa–Samokov.

== Economy ==
The traditional economic activity was agriculture and forestry, which had been replaced by tourism. The local crops are typical of mountainous regions and include potatoes and raspberries.

== Tourism ==
The village is a national climatic resort, as well as a small-scale ski resort. It is located about two kilometers from the boundaries of Rila National Park and is the starting point for numerous hiking trails in the mountain range. In the southwestern edge of the Govedartsi Valley rises the summit of Malyovitsa (2,729 m), one of the most picturesque and popular areas of Rila, considered the cradle of Bulgarian mountaineering. There are trails to several glacial lake groups, such as the Malyovishki Lakes and the Seven Rila Lakes. There are plans to modernise the current ski lift leading from Govedartsi to Malyovitsa to a four-seater lift with a capacity of 1,520 people per hour.

There are several churches, chapels and monasteries in and around Govedartsi. There are a kindergarten, a school, and a medical center.
