= Samokov Municipality =

Coordinates: 42°20′14″N 23°33′27″E

Samokov Municipality Община Самоков
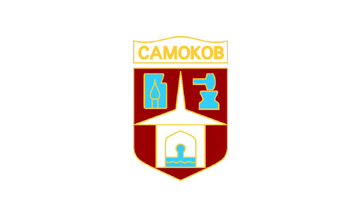
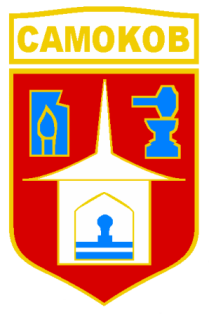
- Flag Coat of arms

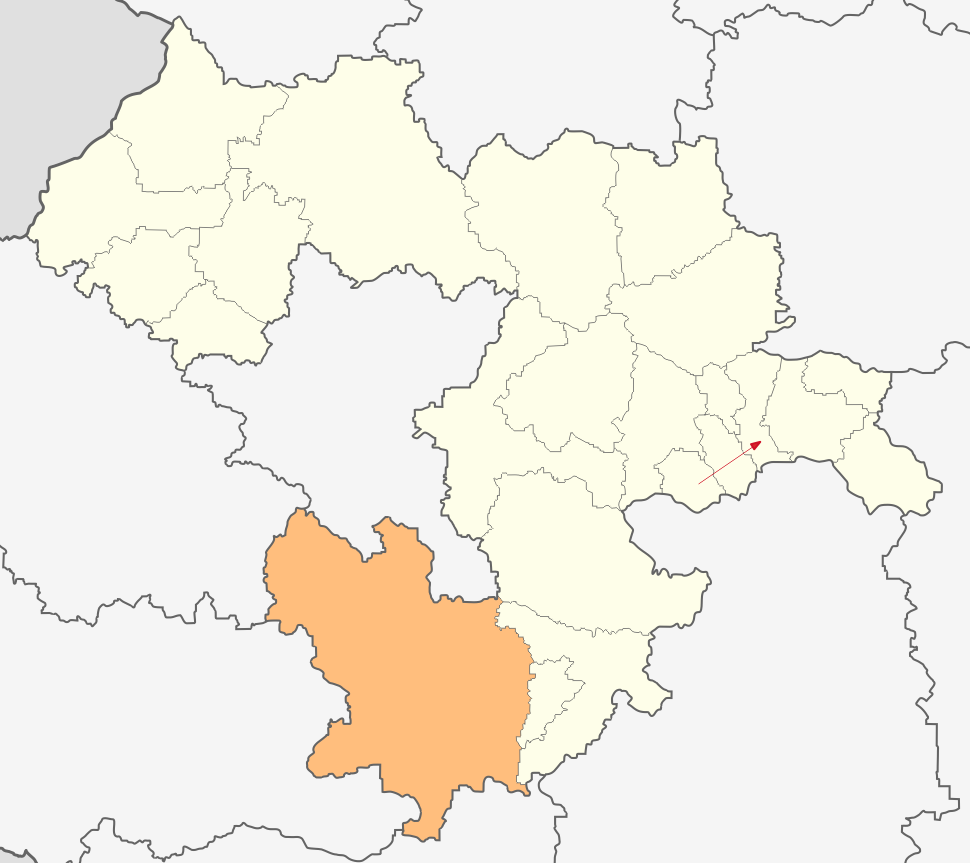
- Country: Bulgaria
- Province: Sofia Province
- Seat: Samokov

Area
  - Total: 1,209.9 km^{2} (467.1 sq mi)

Population (2024)
  - Total: 33,703
  - Density: 27.856/km^{2} (72.147/sq mi)
- Website: www.samokov.bg

Samokov Municipality (Bulgarian: Община Самоков) is a municipality in Sofia Province, central western Bulgaria. Covering a territory of 1,209.9 km^{2}, it is the largest of the 22 municipalities in the province and takes 17.09% of its total area.

== Geography ==
The relief of the municipality is varied. In its center is the Samokov Valley, surrounded by the mountain ranges of Vitosha to the northwest, Plana to the north, Sredna Gora to the east, Rila to the south and Verila to the southwest. The highest areas of Rila fall within the municipality, including the highest summit in Bulgaria and the Balkans Musala (2,925 m), as well as many other prominent peaks, such as Malyovitsa (2,729 m), Damga (2,669 m), Deno (2,790 m), Golyam Mermer (2,602 m), Marishki Chal (2,765 m), Zlia Zab (2,678 m), etc.

The headwaters of the longest river flowing entirely in Bulgaria the Iskar, and the longest river entirely in the Balkan Peninsula the Maritsa are located in the municipality. Most of its territory is drained by the Iskar and its tributaries the Palakaria and the Musalenska Bistritsa. A smaller portion to the east is drained by the Maritsa. There are many glacial lakes in the southern part of the municipality, in Rila, such as the Marichini Lakes, Musala Lakes, Malyovishki Lakes, Urdini Lakes, etc.

The whole southern part of the municipality falls within the Rila National Park, and includes the entire area of the Central Rila Reserve.

== Transport ==
Samokov Municipality is traversed by eight roads of the national network and several local road with a total length of 236.6 km, including the last 21.1 km of the second class II-62 road Kyustendil–Dupnitsa–Samokov, a 38.1 km section of the second class II-82 road Kostenets–Samokov–Sofia, the last 14 km of the third class III-181 road, the first 30 km of the third class III-627 road, the first 17.7 km of the third class III-822 road, the whole 5.2 km length of the third class III-6205 road, the whole 25.6 km length of the third class III-2606 road, and the first 4.4 km of the third class III-8222 road. There are plans to construct the Rila motorway that would link the Struma motorway further west to the Trakiya motorway to the east.

== Demography ==
Historical population
| Year | Pop. | ±% |
|---|---|---|
| 1934 | 43,146 | — |
| 1946 | 48,344 | +12.0% |
| 1956 | 49,869 | +3.2% |
| 1965 | 47,805 | −4.1% |
| 1975 | 49,405 | +3.3% |
| 1985 | 47,753 | −3.3% |
| 1992 | 45,951 | −3.8% |
| 2001 | 42,313 | −7.9% |
| 2011 | 38,089 | −10.0% |
| 2021 | 34,864 | −8.5% |
Source: National Statistics Institute

As of 2024 the population of Samokov Municipality is 33,703, living in one town and 28 villages:

- Alino
- Beli Iskar
- Belchin
- Belchinski Bani
- Govedartsi
- Gorni Okol
- Gutsal
- Dolni Okol
- Dospey
- Dragushinovo
- Zlokuchene
- Klisura
- Kovachevtsi
- Lisets
- Madzhare
- Mala Tsarkva
- Maritsa
- Novo Selo
- Popovyane
- Prodanovtsi
- Raduil
- Raylovo
- Relyovo
- Samokov
- Shipochane
- Shiroki Dol
- Yarebkovitsa
- Yarlovo

== Gallery ==
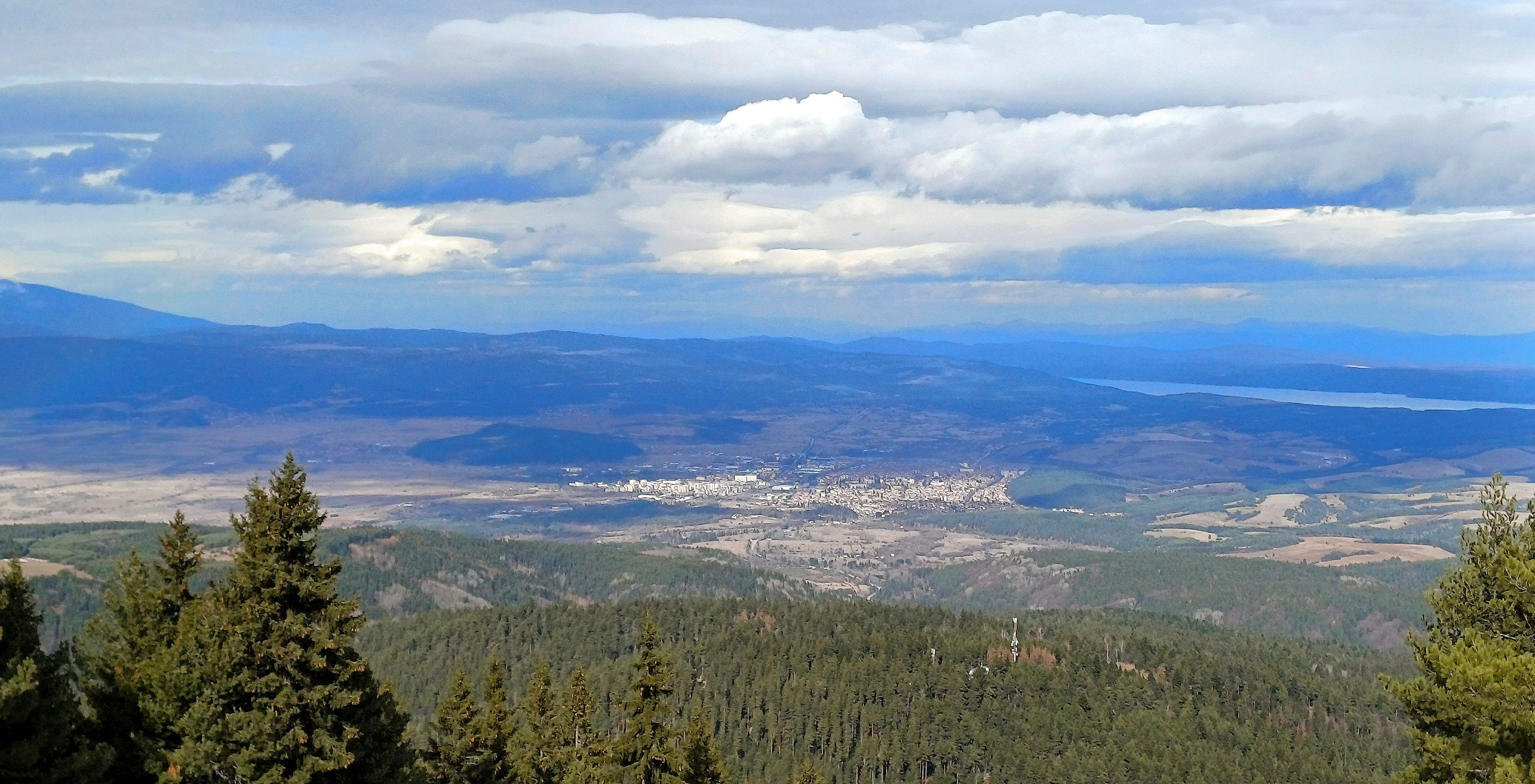
Samokov Valley

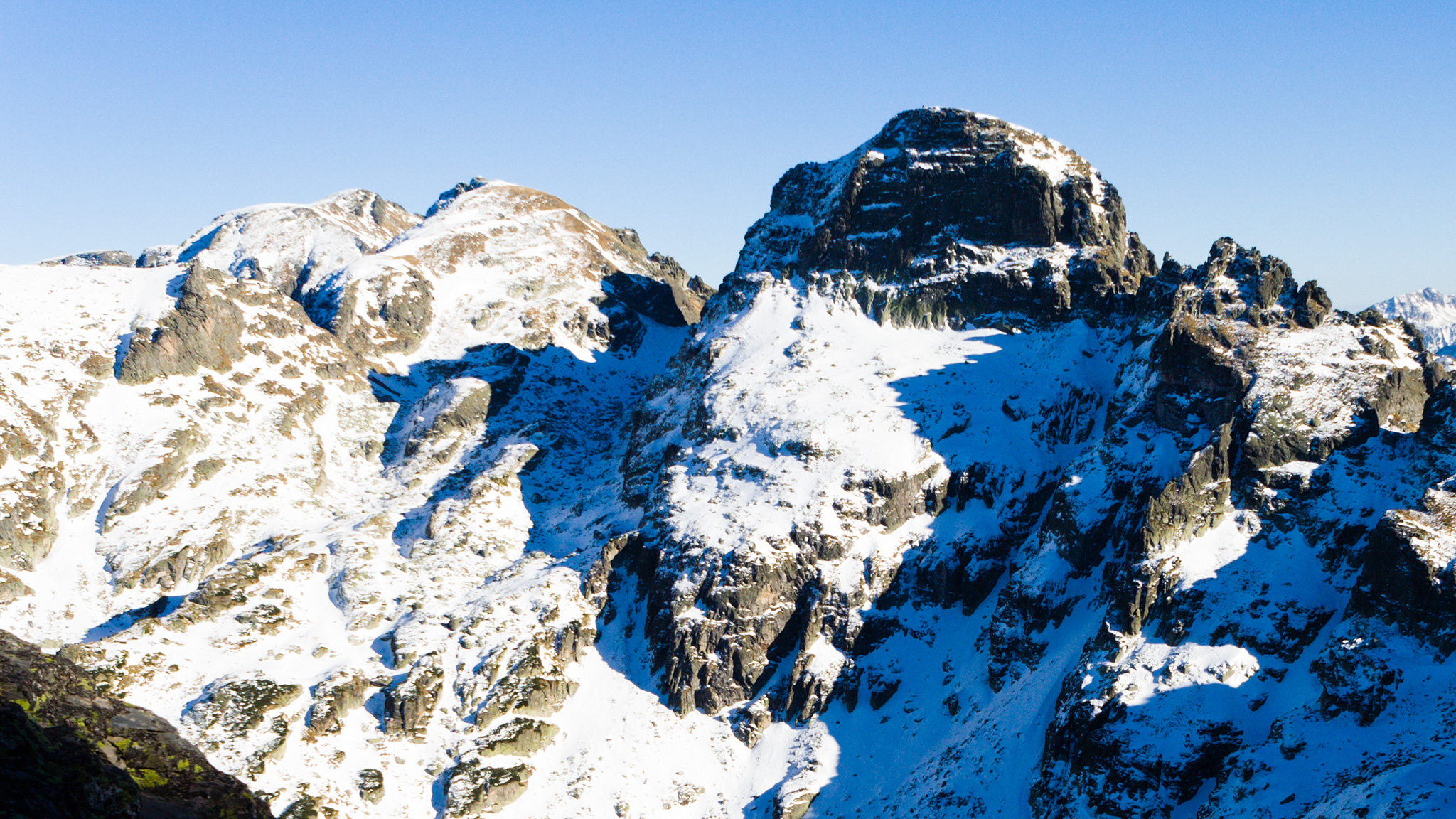
The summit of Orlovets

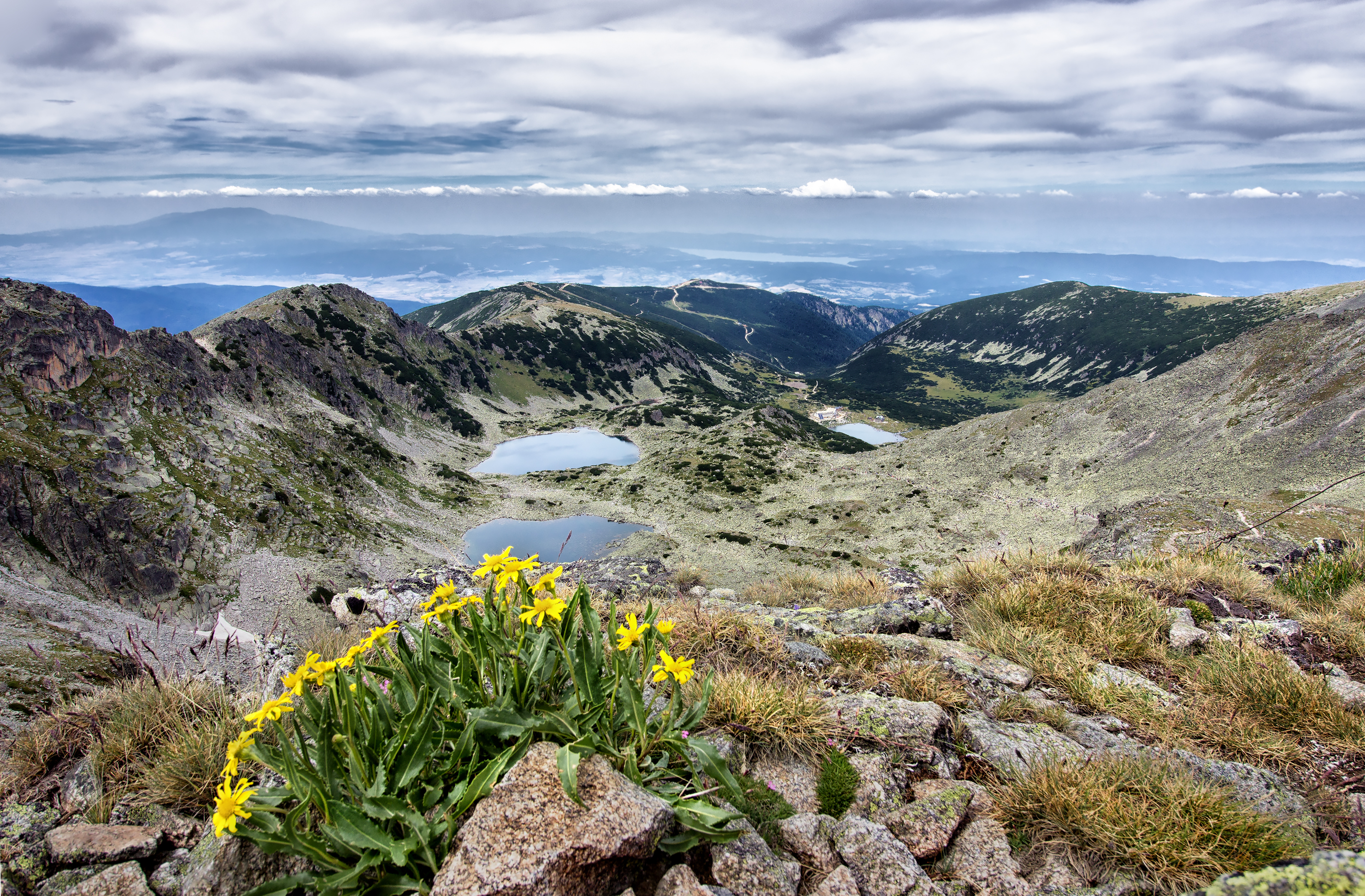
Central Rila Reserve

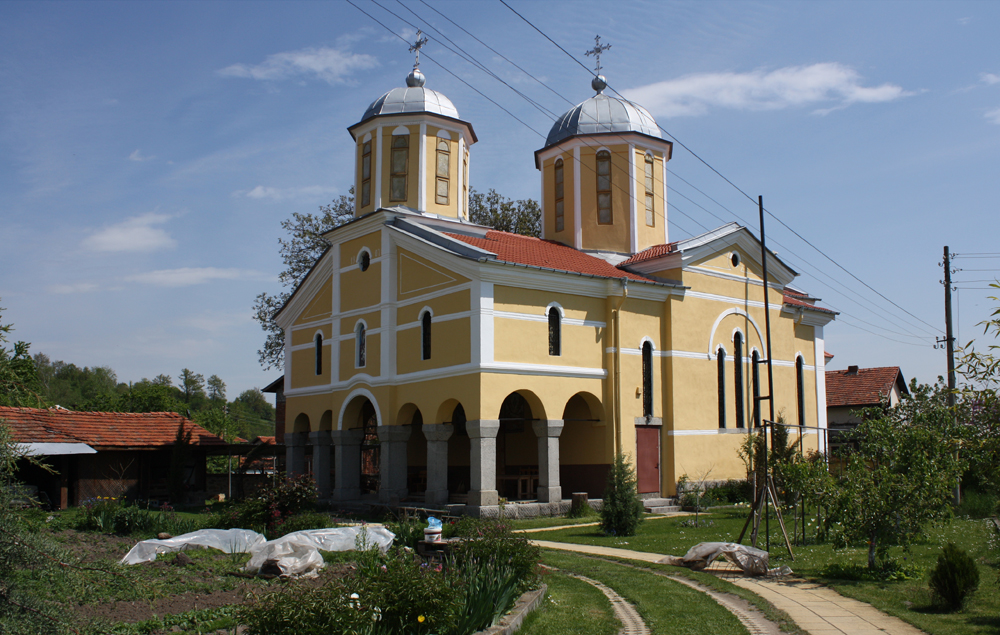
A church in Maritsa
