= Madzhare =

Madzhare Маджаре
- Village
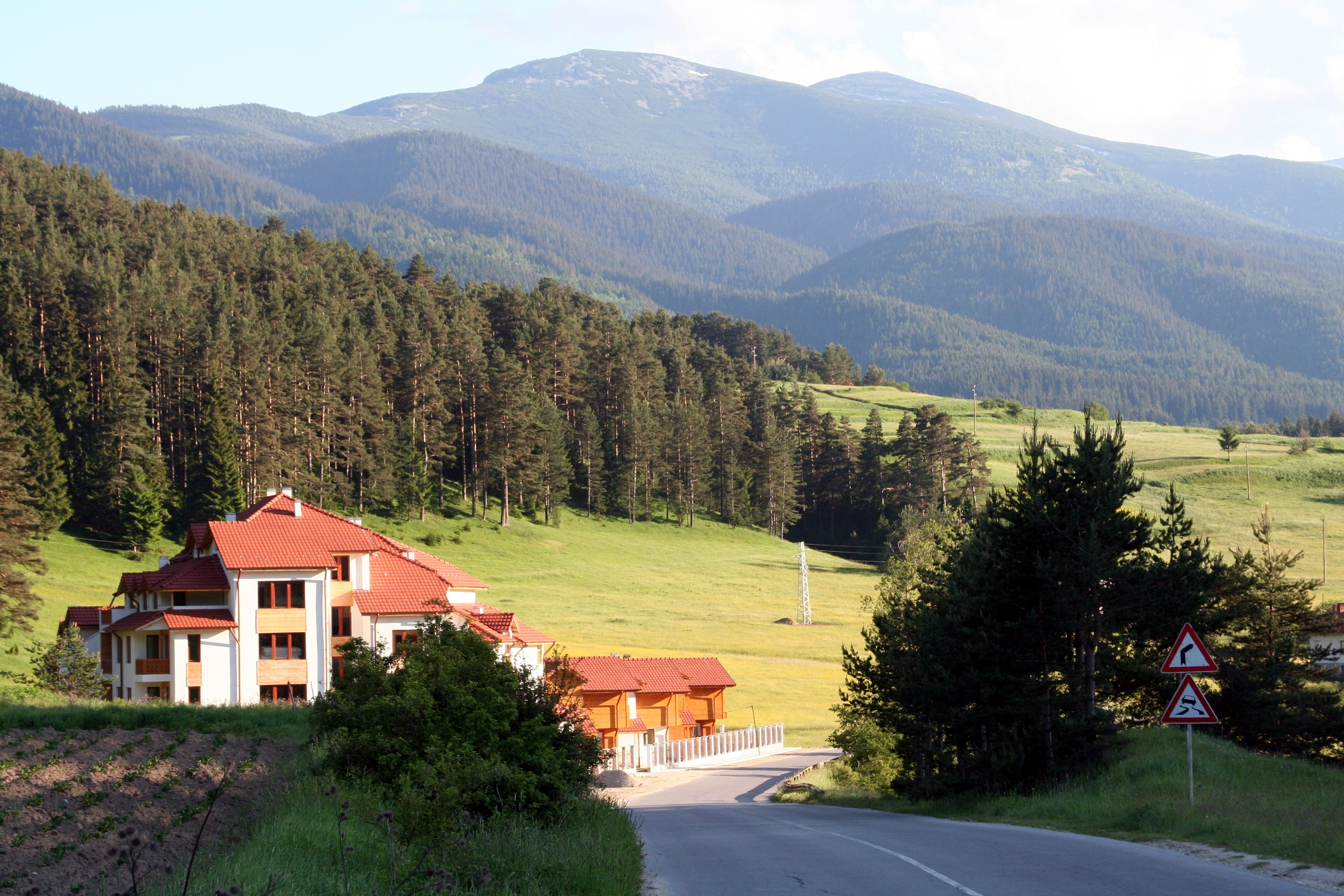

- Location of Madzhare within Bulgaria
- Coordinates: 42°15′59.97″N 23°29′57.56″E
- Country: Bulgaria
- Province: Sofia
- Municipality: Samokov

Government
  - Mayor: Angel Dzhorgov (GERB)

Area
  - Total: 6.309 km^{2} (2.436 sq mi)
- Elevation: 1,118 m (3,668 ft)

Population (2024)
  - Total: 282
  - Density: 44.7/km^{2} (116/sq mi)
- Time zone: UTC+2 (EET)
  - Summer (DST): UTC+3 (EEST)
- Postal Code: 2022
- Area codes: 07125 from Bulgaria, 003597125 from outside

Madzhare (Bulgarian: Маджаре) is a village in the Sofia Province southwestern Bulgaria, located in the Samokov Municipality. As of the 2024 the village had a population of 282.

== Geography ==
Madzhare is located in the upper valley of the river Iskar at the northern foothills of the Rila mountain range. The village lies just east of Govedartsi, both settlement being basically connected. A few hundred meters further east is the village of Mala Tsarkva. It is situated close to the ski resorts of Borovets and Malyovitsa. Madzhare has a territory of 6.309 km^{2}.

It lies on the third class III-6206 road that stems from the second class II-62 road Kyustendil–Dupnitsa–Samokov.

== Gallery ==
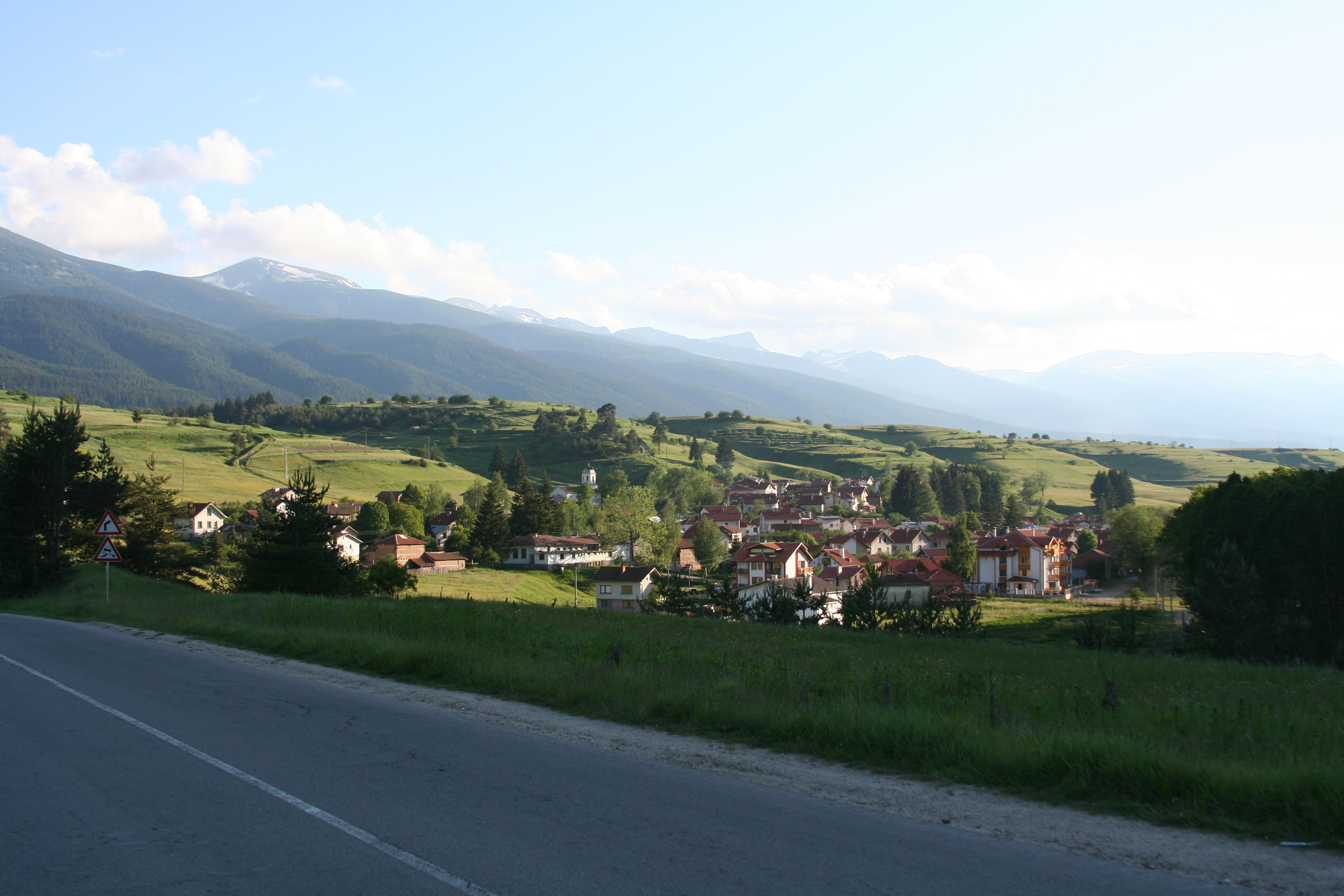
General view

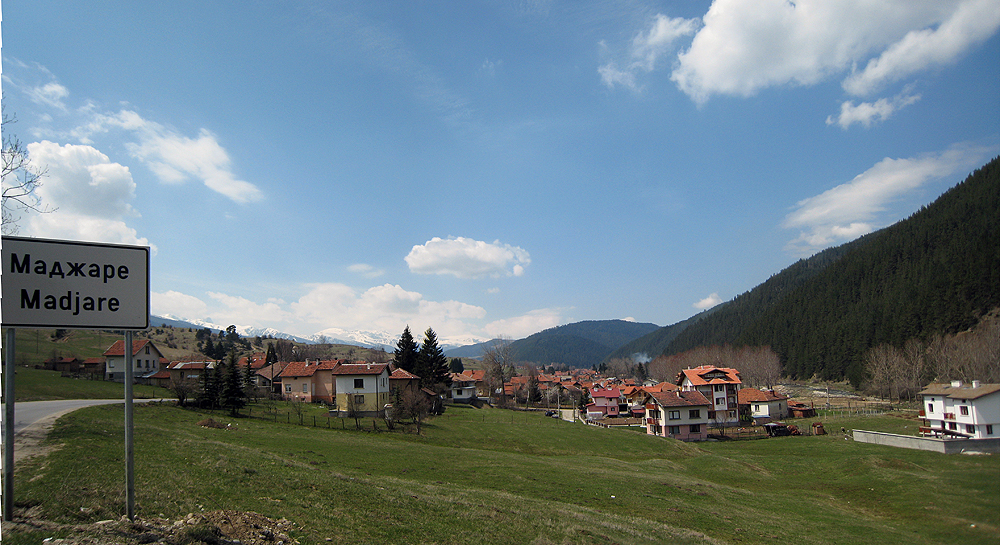
General view

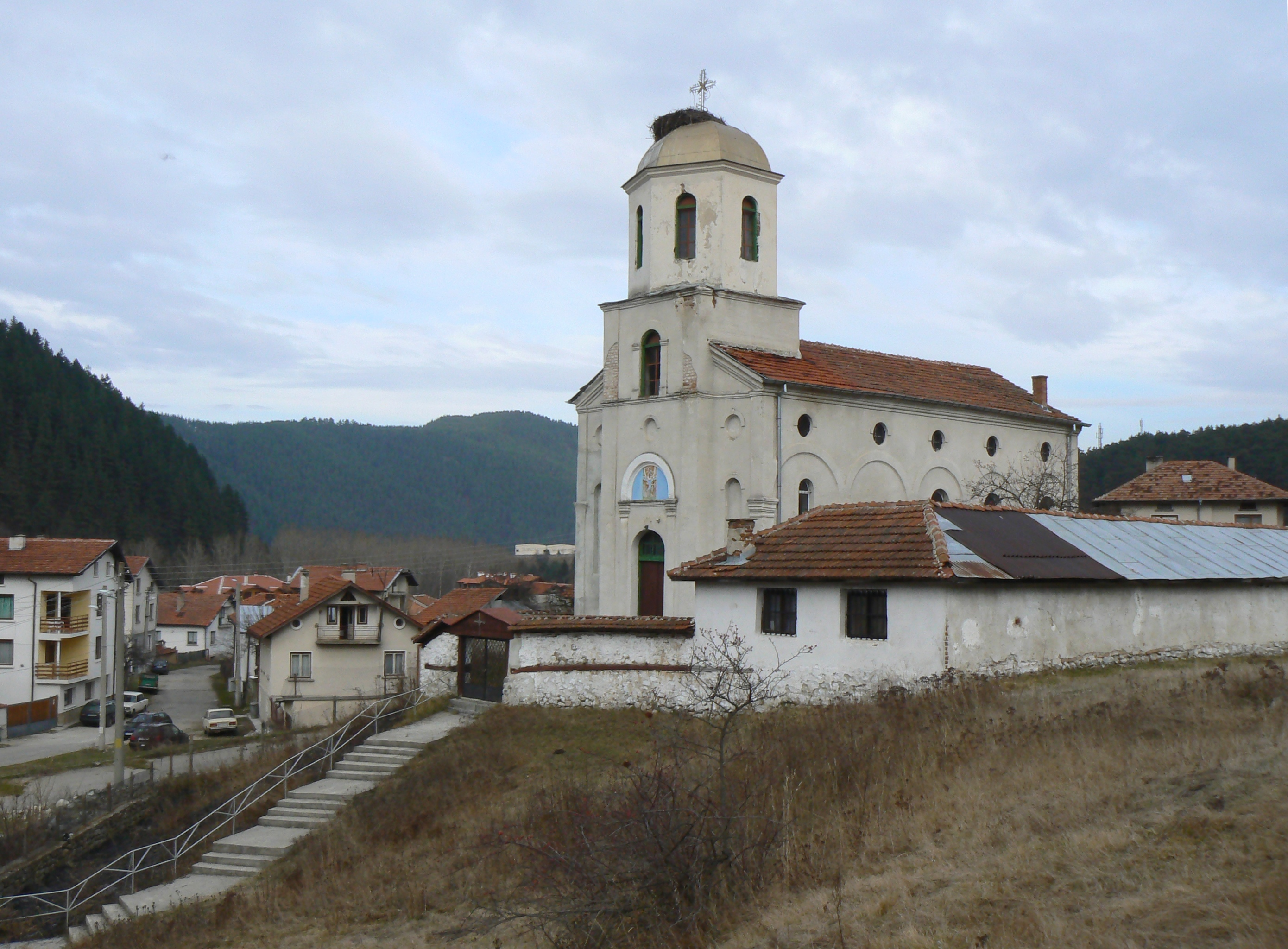
St Spas Church
