= Belchinski Bani =

Belchinski Bani Белчински бани
- Village
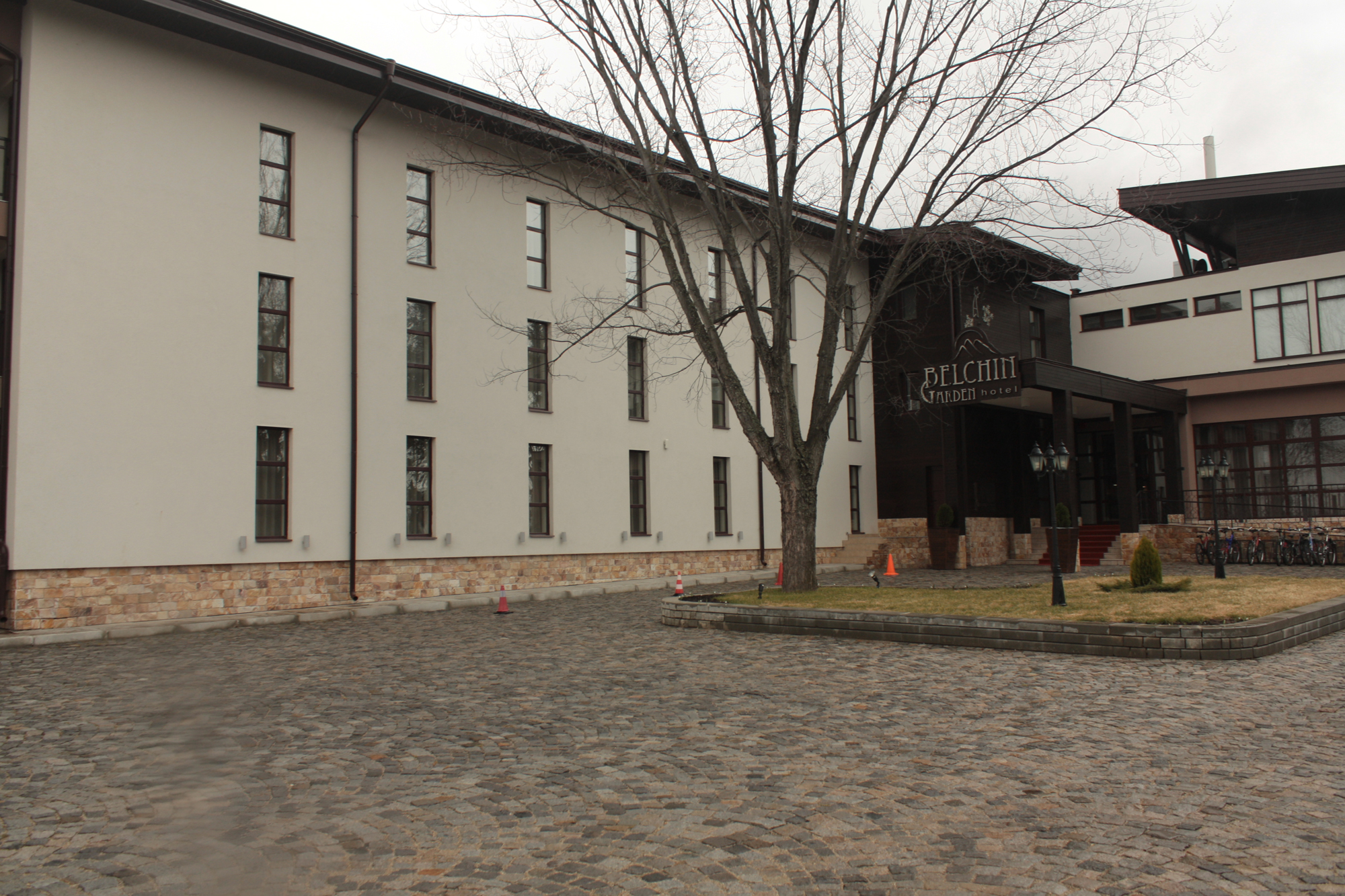

- Location of Belchinski Bani within Bulgaria
- Coordinates: 42°22′0.1″N 23°24′49.07″E
- Country: Bulgaria
- Province: Sofia
- Municipality: Samokov

Government
  - Mayor: Angel Dzhorgov (GERB)
- Elevation: 906 m (2,972 ft)

Population (2024)
  - Total: 22
- Time zone: UTC+2 (EET)
  - Summer (DST): UTC+3 (EEST)
- Postal Code: 2024
- Area codes: 07124 from Bulgaria, 003597124 from outside

Belchinski Bani (Bulgarian: Белчински бани) is a village and a spa resort in the Sofia Province southwestern Bulgaria, located in the Samokov Municipality. As of the 2024 the village had a population of 22.

== Geography ==
Belchinski Bani is located in the Samokov Valley at the foothills of the Rila mountain range, very close to mountain ranges of Vitosha, Verila and Plana. It is close the river Palakaria of the Iskar drainage. The village lies some 37 km west south of the national capital Sofia, 12 km west of the municipal center Samokov and about a kilometer east of the village of Belchin.

It lies just north of the second class II-62 road Kyustendil–Dupnitsa–Samokov.

== Mineral baths ==
Belchinski Bani is located over mineral springs with a total discharge of 24 L/sec and temperature of 40–41.5 °С. There are three mineral complexes with hotels, pools and other facilities. The local mineral water has curative and prophylactic effects on the musculoskeletal system and skin dermatitis.
