= Belchin =

Belchin Белчин
- Village
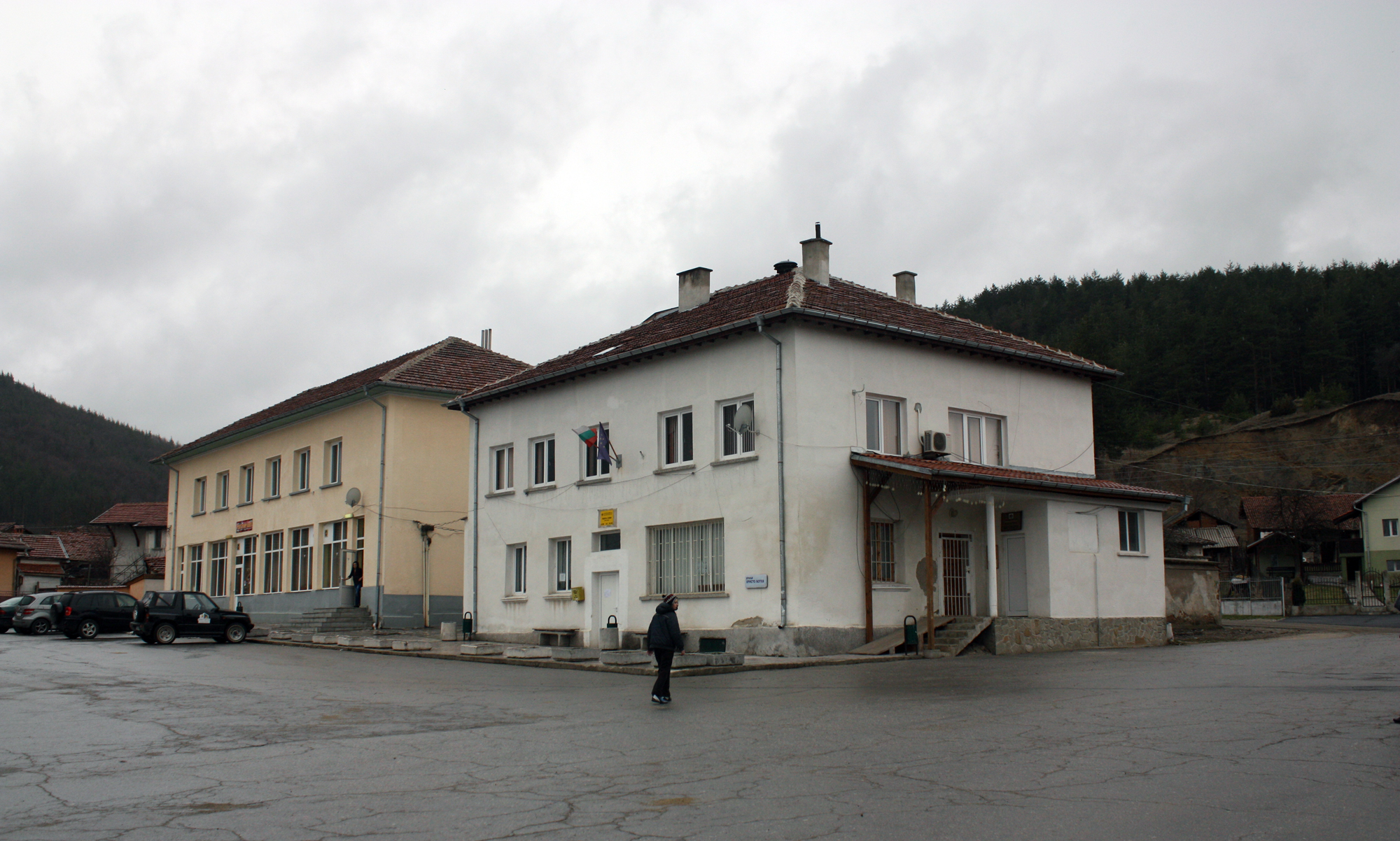

- Location of Belchin within Bulgaria
- Coordinates: 42°21′42.33″N 23°22′50.64″E
- Country: Bulgaria
- Province: Sofia
- Municipality: Samokov

Government
  - Mayor: Angel Dzhorgov (GERB)

Area
  - Total: 35.147 km^{2} (13.570 sq mi)
- Elevation: 931 m (3,054 ft)

Population (2024)
  - Total: 367
  - Density: 10.4/km^{2} (27.0/sq mi)
- Time zone: UTC+2 (EET)
  - Summer (DST): UTC+3 (EEST)
- Postal Code: 2025
- Area codes: 07124 from Bulgaria, 003597124 from outside

Belchin (Bulgarian: Белчин) is a village in the Sofia Province southwestern Bulgaria, located in the Samokov Municipality. As of the 2024 the village had a population of 367.

== Geography ==
Belchin is located in the Samokov Valley at the foothills of the Rila mountain range, very close to mountain ranges of Vitosha, Verila and Plana. It is close the river Palakaria of the Iskar drainage. The village lies some 13 km west of the municipal center Samokov and about a kilometer west of the spa resort of Belchinski Bani. Belchin has a territory of 35.147 km^{2}.

It lies just north of the second class II-62 road Kyustendil–Dupnitsa–Samokov. There are favourable conditions for agriculture, the main crops include potatoes, linen and grain. Livestock include cattle and sheep.

== History and landmarks ==
The area was populated during the Late antiquity. The village existed during the Second Bulgarian Empire in the 13th and 14th century. The fortress of Tsari Mali Grad near Belchin has been restored and is part of the 100 Tourist Sites of Bulgaria. There are two churches, Saint Apostles Peter and Paul consecrated in 1883 and Saint Petka, constructed in the 17th century over an older medieval church dated to the 13th–14th centuries.

== Gallery ==
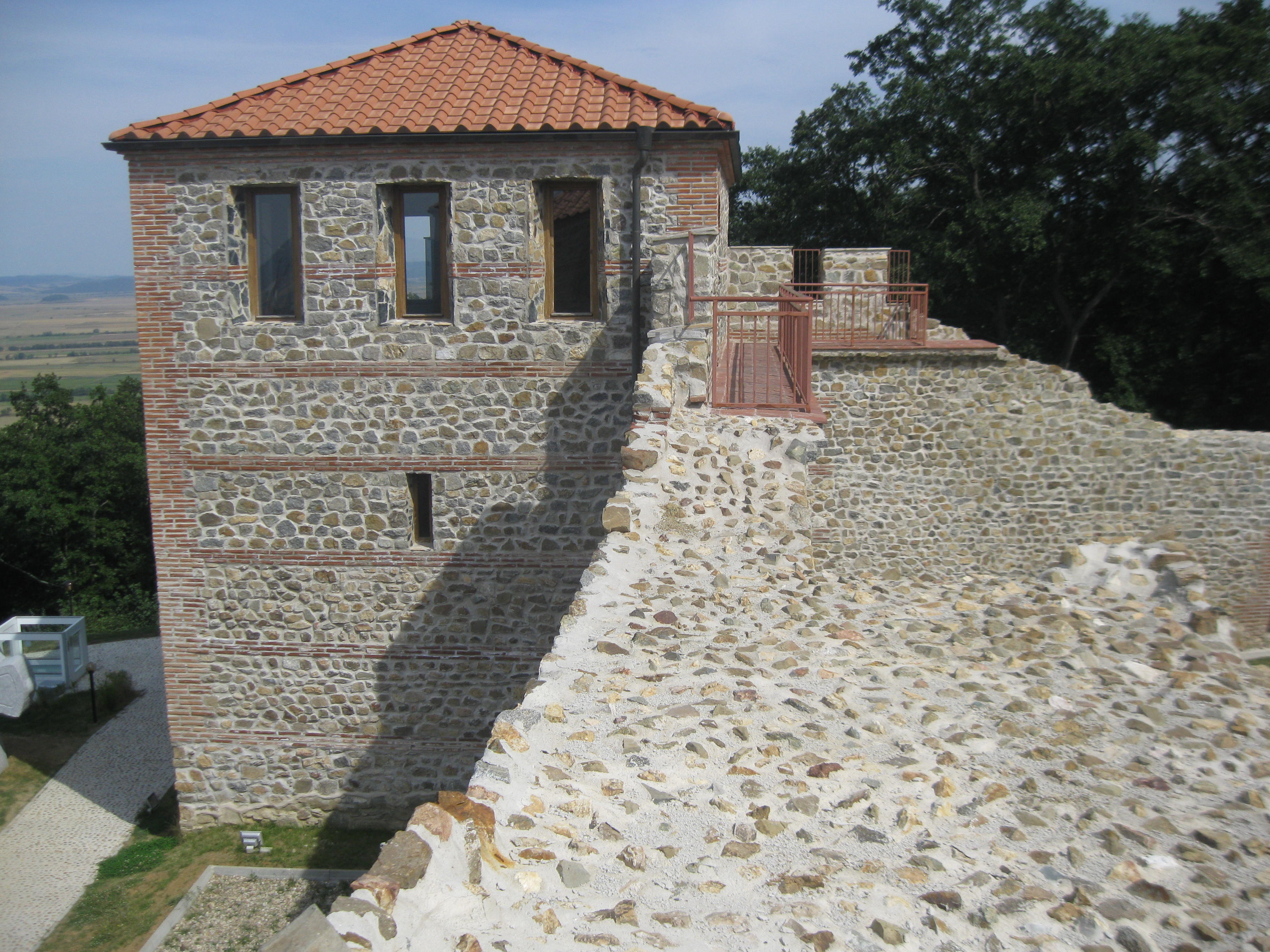
Tsari Mali Grad Fortress

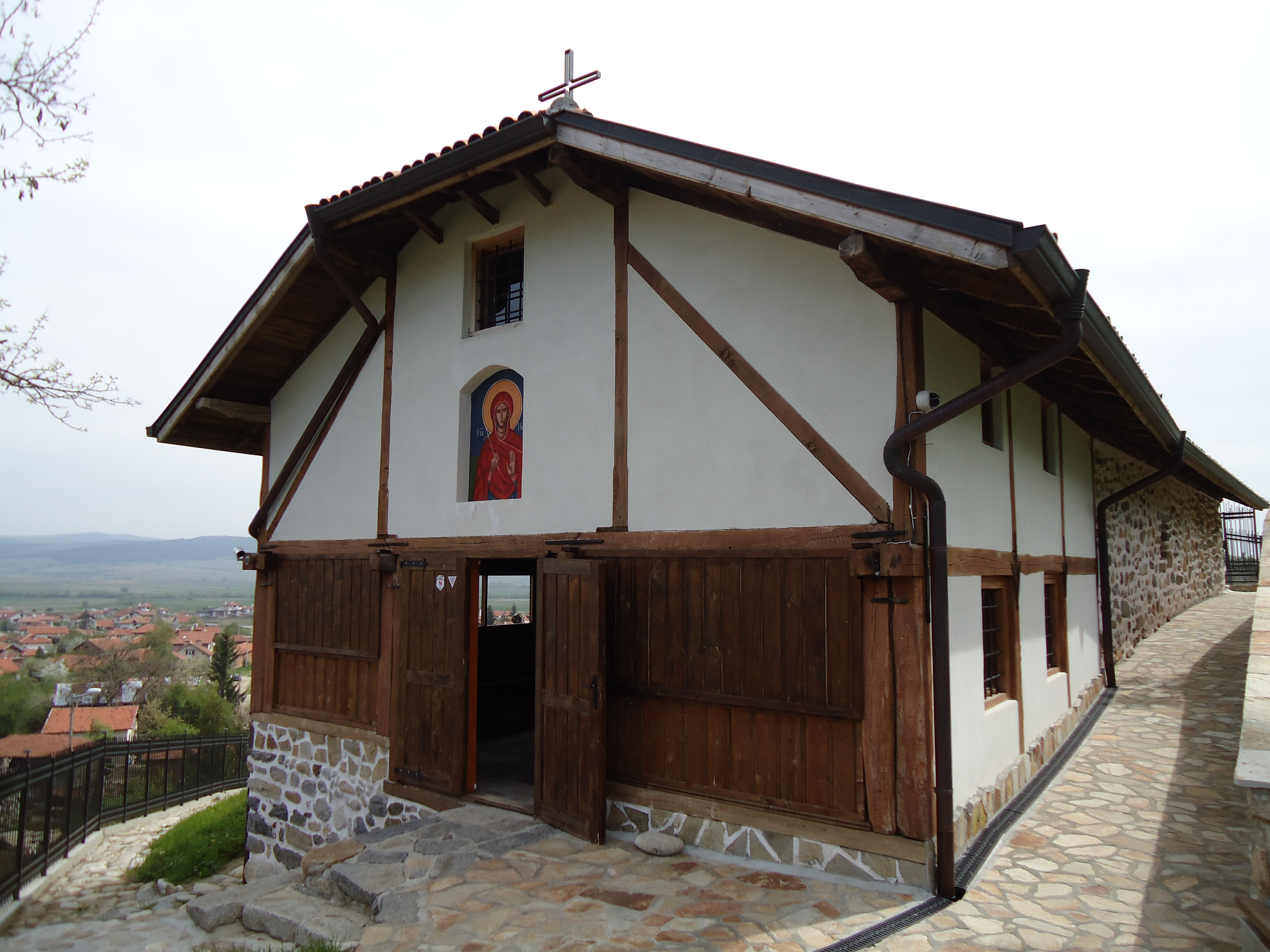
Church of Saint Petka

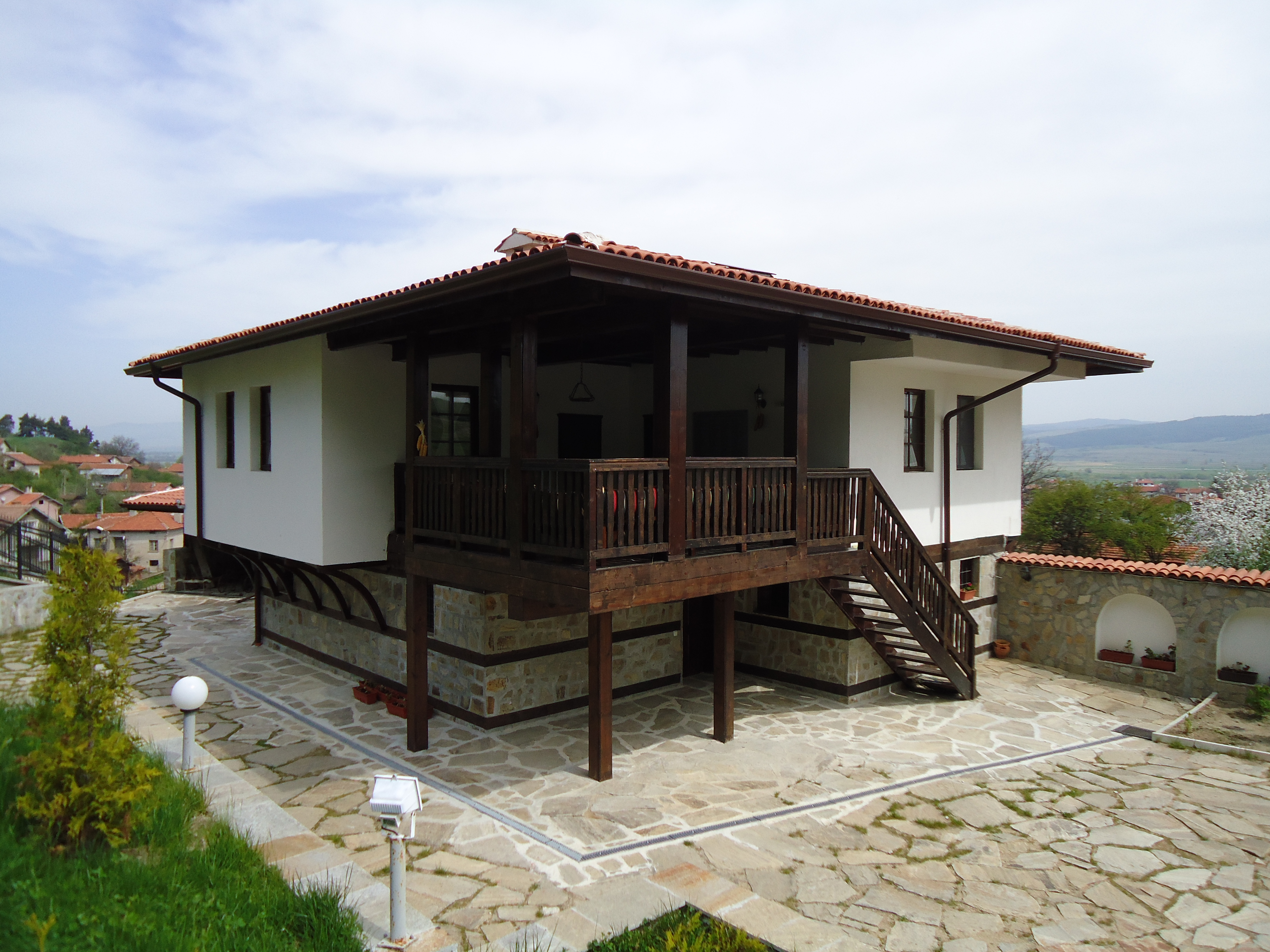
Ethnographic Museum
