= Elenski Lakes =

Glacial lakes in Bulgaria

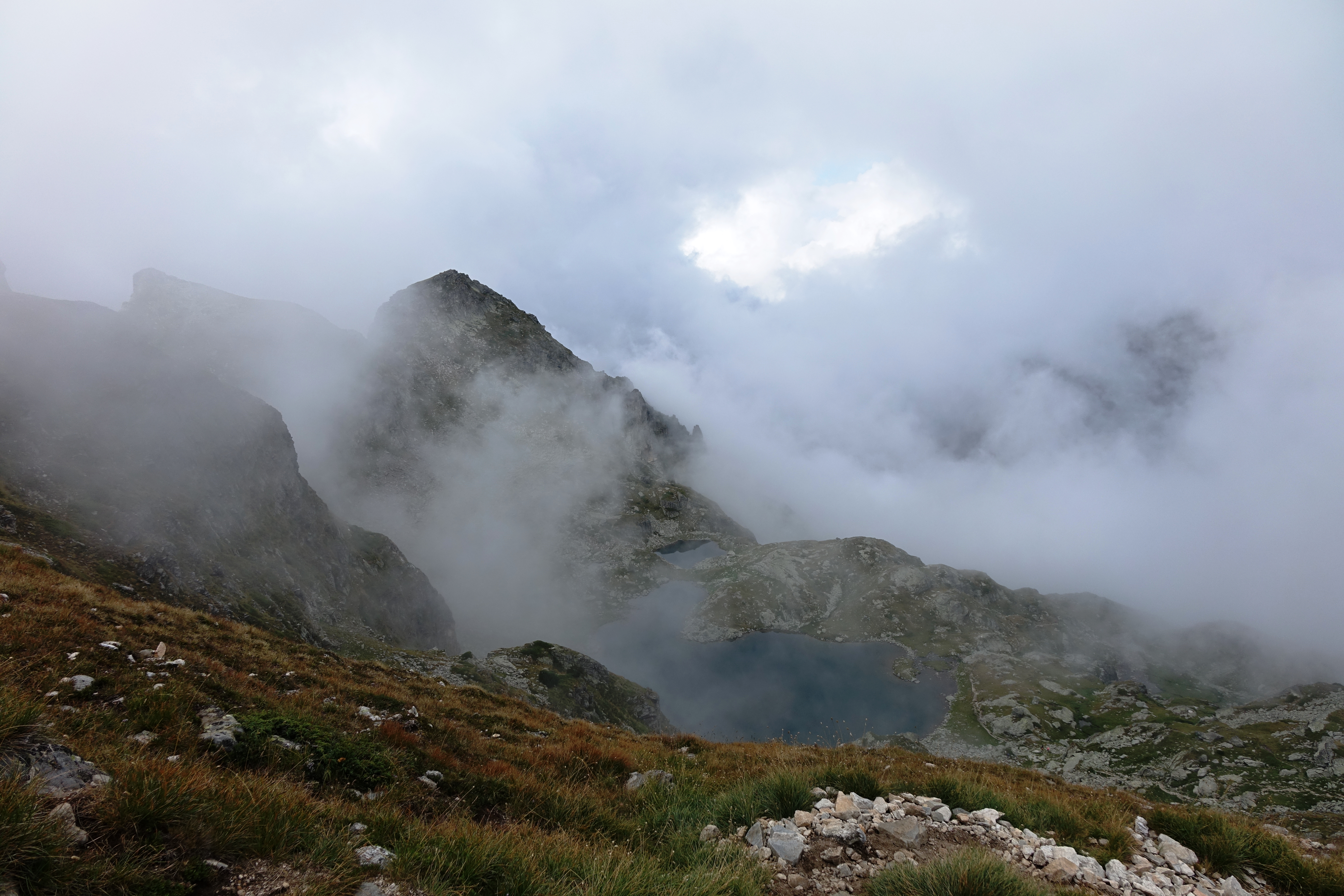

- Location within Bulgaria
- Coordinates: 42°10′20″N 23°22′8″E
- Basin countries: Bulgaria
- Surface elevation: 2,479 m (8,133 ft) to 2,403 m (7,884 ft)

Elenski Lakes (Bulgarian: Еленски езера, meaning Deer Lakes) are a group of three glacial lakes situated in the northwestern part of the Rila mountain range in southwestern Bulgaria. They are located in a cirque terrace east of the major summit of Malyovitsa (2,729 m). The cirque is surrounded of the summits of Malyovitsa, Malka Malyovitsa (2,640 m) and Orleto (2,575 m) to the north and west, and Elenin Vrah (2,654 m) to the south.

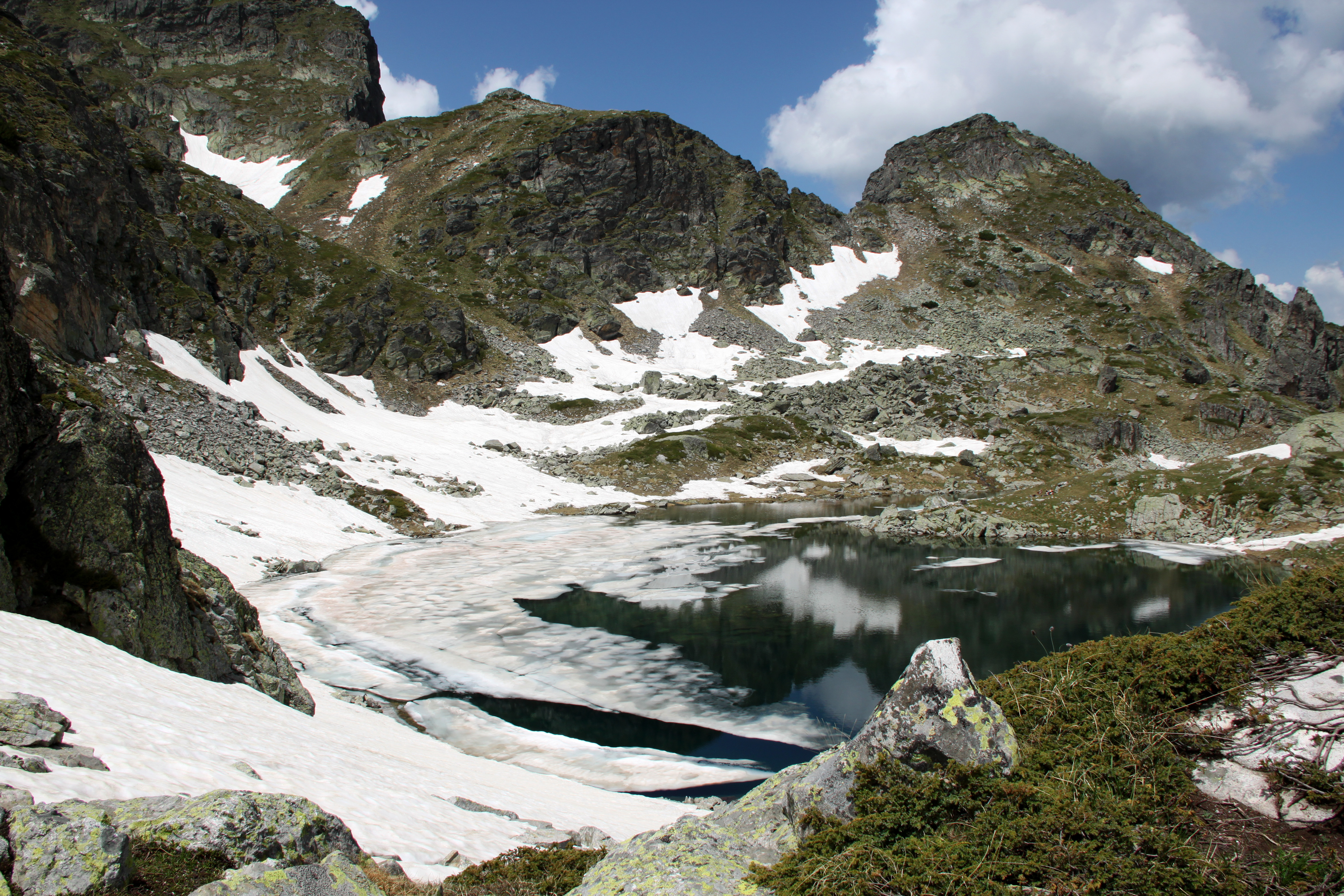
Elenino Lake

Elenino Lake is the largest and the highest of the three, situated at an altitude of 2,479 m. It has an irregular elongated shape with a length of 220 m, a width of 62 m, an area of 14,000 m and a depth of 5 m^{2}. The total volume is 32,000 m^{3}. It is mainly fed by snow melting. Part of its waters flow underground to the lakes below. From its western shore there is a clear view of the summit of Orlovets (2,686 m). A winter trail for climbing Malyovitsa passes along the lake, in addition to the marked summer trail from the refuge of Malyovitsa to the refuge of Ivan Vazov.

The second lake is situated is at an altitude of 2,474 m just 20 m north of the Elenino Lake. The lowest and the smallest of the three lies some 160 m northeast of the second lake at an altitude of 2,403 m. It has an elongated shape in the direction northwest to southeast. The lakes form the headwaters of the Malyovitsa, a right tributary of the Cherni Iskar, which is the main stem of the longest river flowing entirely in Bulgarian territory, the Iskar.
