= Samokov Valley =

Valley in Bulgaria

- Valley
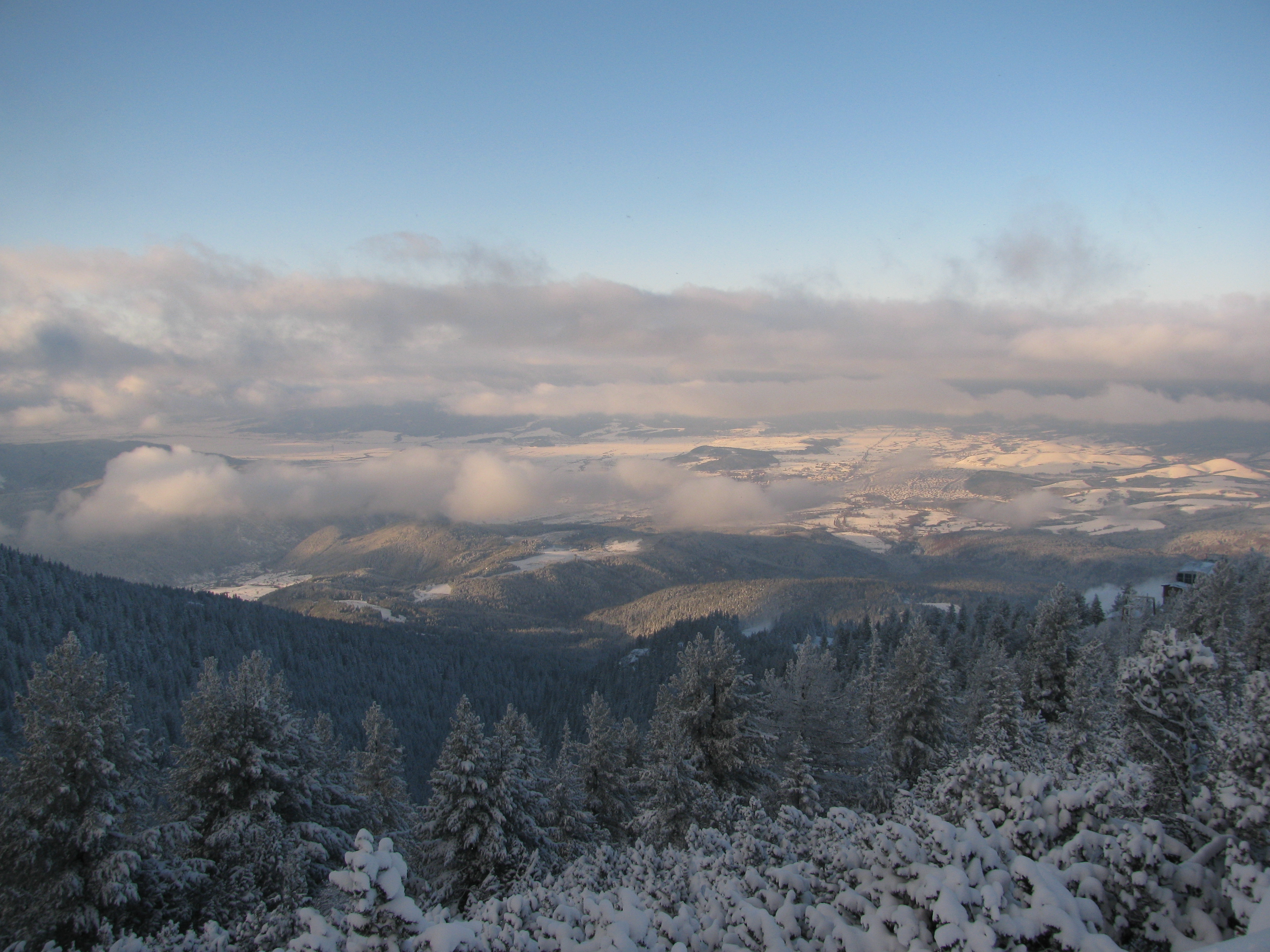
- The valley from Borovets
- Interactive map of Samokov Valley
- Coordinates: 42°20′17″N 23°33′35″E
- Location: Bulgaria

Area
  - Total: 185 km^{2} (71 sq mi)

Dimensions
  - Length: 55 km (34 mi)
  - Width: 10 km (6.2 mi)

Samokov Valley (Bulgarian: Самоковска котловина) is situated in western Bulgaria, less than 25 km south of the outskirts of the capital Sofia. It is named after the town of Samokov, its main settlement. The valley is a hub for tourism in the neighbouring Rila mountain range to the south, the highest in Bulgaria and the Balkans.

== Geography ==
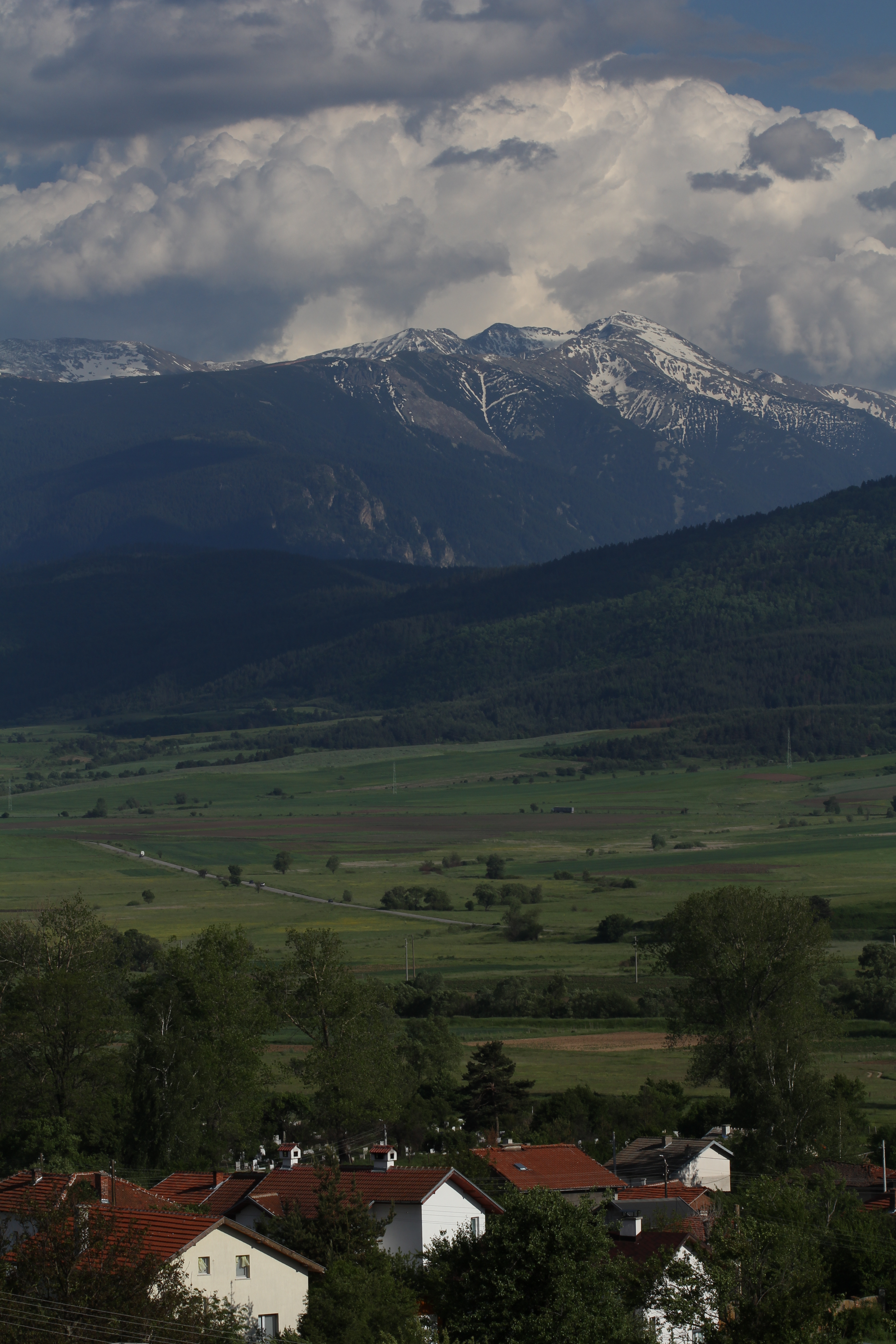
Samokov Valley and Rila at Relyovo

The valley is enclosed between Rila to the south and the mountain ranges of Verila to the west, Vitosha to the northwest, Plana to the north and the Shipochanski ridge of Sredna Gora to the east. To the north the Pancharevo Gorge of the river Iskar connects it with the Sofia Valley. It is also connected with the Radomir Valley via the Buka Preslap saddle (1,090 m) to the northwest, the Dupnitsa Valley via the Klisura saddle (1,025 m) to the southwest, and the Kostenets–Dolna Banya Valley via the Borovets saddle to the southeast.

The valley has an irregular shape resembling an arch bulging in southeastern direction with a length of 55 km and a maximum width of 10 km. It spans a territory of 185 km^{2} with an average altitude is 950 m, making it one of the highest valleys in Bulgaria. The Samokov Valley is divided in two parts — a western Palakaria section and an eastern Iskar section, the latter is further subdivided in the Upper and Lower Samokov field. In 1955 the Lower Samokov field was submerged under the Iskar Reservoir.

The valley was formed during the Neogene–Quaternary period as a result of subsidence along the surrounding faults. During the Pliocene, parts of it were a freshwater lake. During the Quaternary, it was filled with powerful alluvial and fluvial–glacial sediments from Rila.

The climate is temperate continental with Alpine influence. The average annual temperature is 7.3 °C, with an average of -3.4 °C in January and 17.3 °C in June. The mean annual precipitation is 653 mm. The valley is drained by the longest river entirely in Bulgarian territory, the Iskar, and its tributaries the Palakaria (left), the Musalenska Bistritsa (right) and the Shipochanitsa (right). The predominant soils are alluvial.

== Settlements, transportation and economy ==
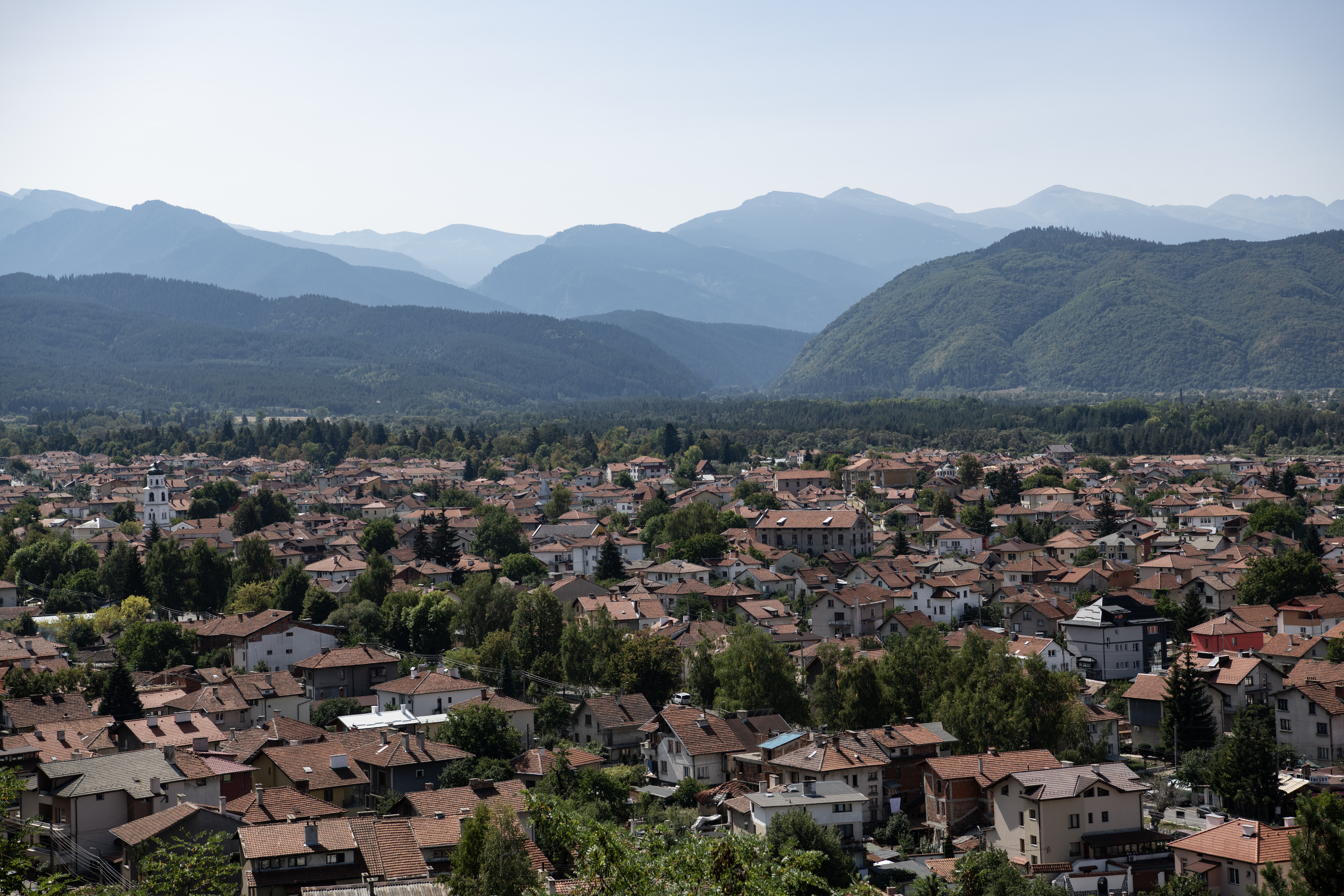
A view of Samokov

Administratively, it falls in Sofia Province, on the territory of Samokov Municipality. There are one town and 13 villages — the town of Samokov and the villages of Alino, Belchin, Belchinski Bani, Dospey, Dragushinovo, Zlokuchene, Kovachevtsi, Popovyane, Prodanovtsi, Rayovo, Relyovo, Shiroki Dol and Yarlovo.

The valley is served by five roads of the national network, as well as local roads. From west to east in its southern reaches passes a 12.1 km stretch of the second class II-62 road Kyustendil–Dupnitsa–Samokov. From north to south in its eastern parts between the dam of the Iskar Reservoir and the Borovets saddle the valley is traversed by a 32.9 km section of the second class II-82 road Sofia–Samokov–Kostenets. In direction north–south in its western areas between the villages of Kovachevtsi and Popovyane there is 6.2 km stretch of the third class III-181 road Sofia–Zheleznitsa–Popovyane; to the west along the valley of the river Palakaria there is also a 27.5 km section of the third class III-627 road Samokov–Dolna Dikanya–Radomir. In the easternmost part passes a 6.2 km stretch of the third class III-822 road Samokov–Novo Selo–Ihtiman.

There are favourable conditions for growing cold-resistant crops, such as cereals, flax, potatoes, fruits. The town of Samokov is the local manufacturing hub producing machinery, military products, textiles, food. The valley and its surroundings have numerous tourist attractions. Samokov was an important cultural center of the Bulgarian National Revival and has historical buildings, churches and museums. Belchinski Bani is a spa resort; the local mineral springs have a total discharge of 24 L/sec and temperature of 40–41.5 °C, Near Belchin is located the recently restored Tsari Mali Grad Fortress. The valley is a starting point for tourism in Rila and Rila National Park. The oldest winter resort in Bulgaria and the largest one in the mountain range, Borovets, is situated 9 km south of Samokov.

== Sources ==
- Мичев (Michev), Николай (Nikolay); Михайлов (Mihaylov), Цветко (Tsvetko); Вапцаров (Vaptsarov), Иван (Ivan); Кираджиев (Kiradzhiev), Светлин (Svetlin) (1980). Географски речник на България [Geographic Dictionary of Bulgaria] (in Bulgarian). София (Sofia): Наука и култура (Nauka i kultura).
- Дончев (Donchev), Дончо (Doncho); Каракашев (Karakashev), Христо (Hristo) (2004). Теми по физическа и социално-икономическа география на България (Topics on Physical and Social-Economic Geography of Bulgaria) (in Bulgarian). София (Sofia): Ciela. ISBN 954-649-717-7.
