= Palakaria =

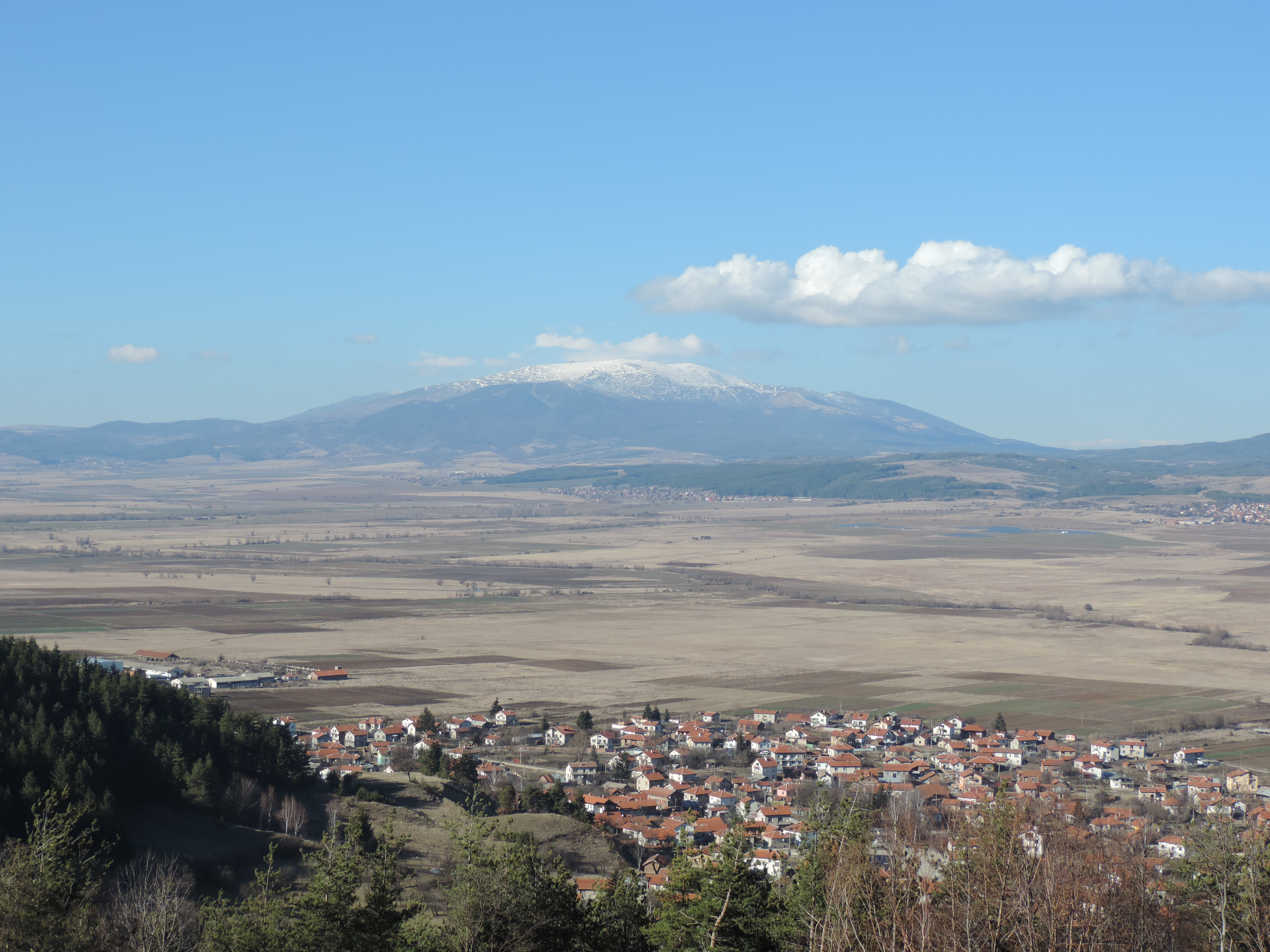
- The Palakaria river valley

Location
- Country: Bulgaria

Physical characteristics
- Source
  - location: Kupena, Vitosha
  - elevation: 2,015 m (6,611 ft)
- Mouth
  - location: Iskar River
  - coordinates: 42°25′39″N 23°31′55.92″E
  - elevation: 827 m (2,713 ft)
- Length: 39 km (24 mi)
- Basin size: 402 km^{2} (155 sq mi)

Basin features
- Progression: Iskar→ Danube→ Black Sea

The Palakaria (Bulgarian: Палакария) is a river in south-western Bulgaria, a left tributary of the Iskar. The river is 39 km long and takes its source from the southern slopes of the summit of Kupena in Vitosha mountain range at an altitude of 2,015 m. It flows in southern direction and turns to the south-east downstream of the village of Yarlovo and flows through a wide valley known as Palakariata between the mountain ranges of Plana to the north-east and Verila to the south-west. At the village of Belchin it turns to the east and flows through the Samokov Valley very close to Relyovo. Palakaria then turns in north-eastern direction at the village of Rayovo and to the north downstream of the village of Shiroki Dol.

It flows into the Iskar at an altitude of 827 m. Its drainage basin covers a territory of 402 km^{2} or 4.7% of Iskar's total. The average annual flow is 1.85 m^{3}/s at the village of Relyovo.

The river flows through the village of Yarlovo, Kovachevtsi, Popovyane, Belchin, Relyovo, Rayovo and Shiroki Dol in Samokov Municipality, Sofia Province. Its waters are used to irrigation.
