= Yarlovo =

Yarlovo Ярлово
- Village
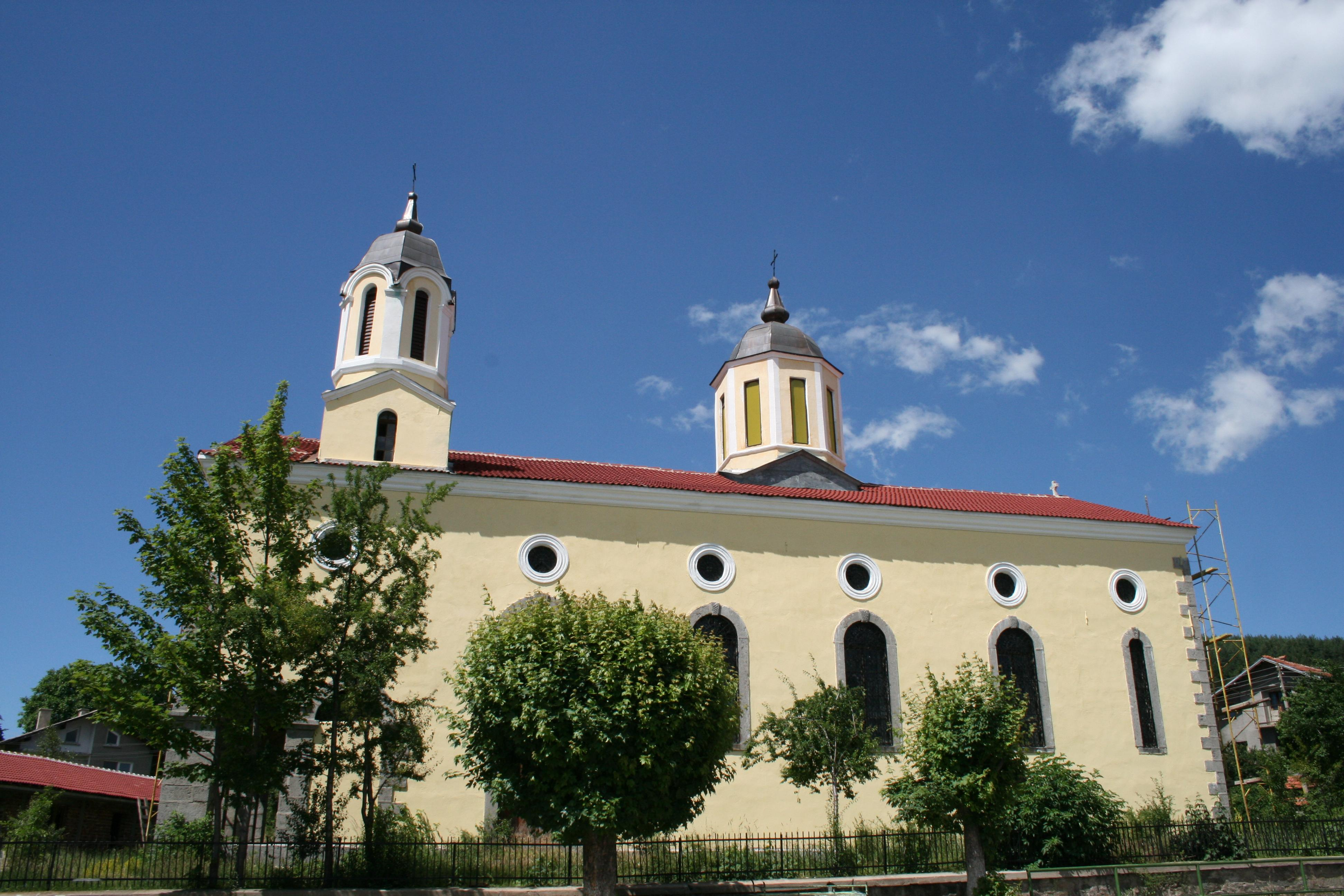

- Location of Yarlovo
- Coordinates: 42°28′N 23°16′E
- Country: Bulgaria
- Provinces (Oblast): Sofia Province
- Elevation: 1,020 m (3,350 ft)
- Time zone: UTC+2 (EET)
  - Summer (DST): UTC+3 (EEST)
- Postal Code: 202

Yarlovo (Bulgarian: Ярлово) is a village in Samokov Municipality of Sofia Province in southwestern Bulgaria. It is located 24 kilometers from the capital Sofia. It is situated in Samokov Valley on the west slopes of the Vitosha mountain massif; the altitude exceeds 1,000 meters. The village has over 500 inhabitants.

Yarlovo Nunatak on Trinity Peninsula in Antarctica is named after the village.
