= Malyovishki Lakes =

Three glacial lakes in Bulgaria

Coordinates: 42°10′49″N 23°22′1″E

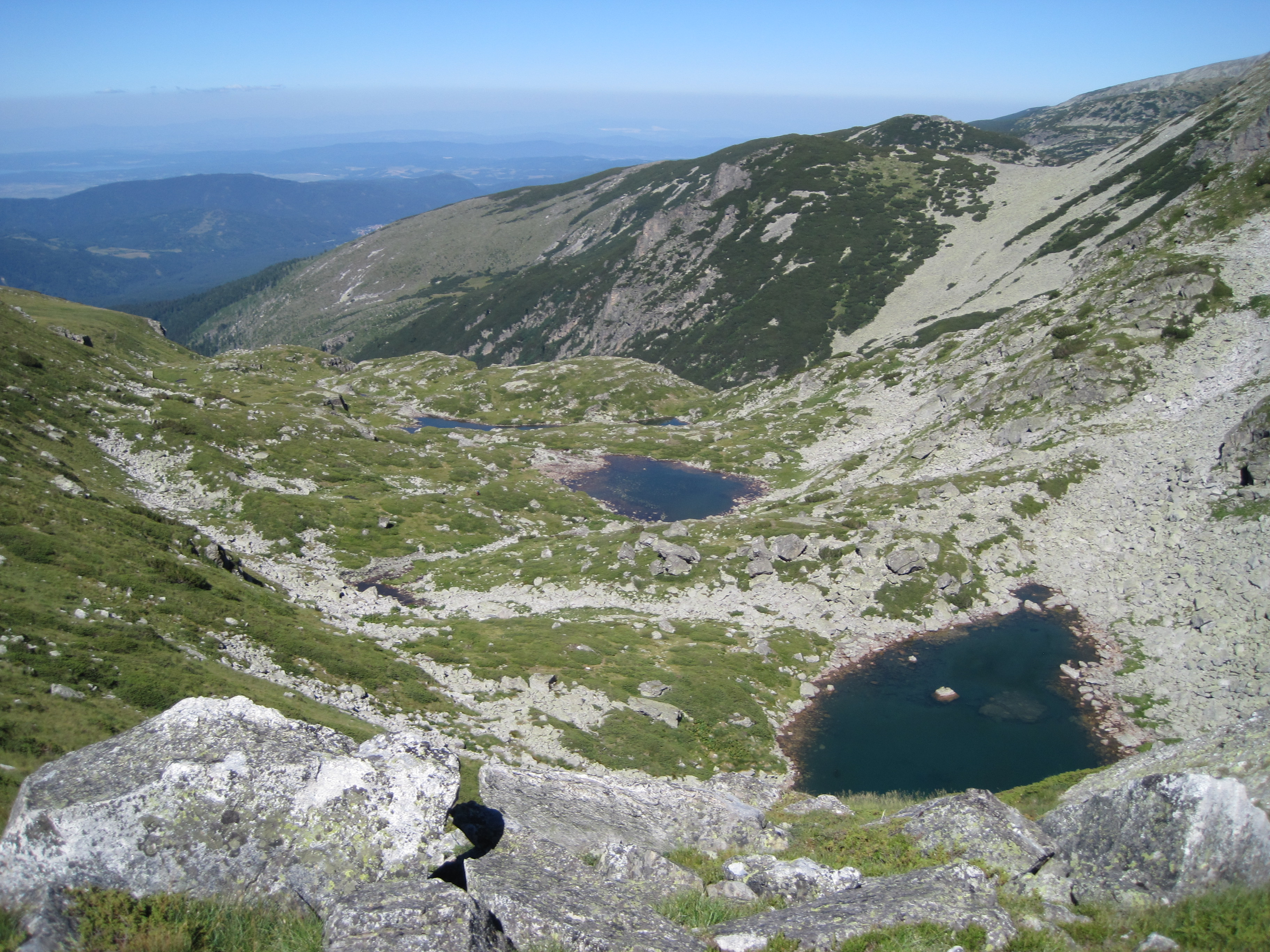
The three Maliovitsa Lakes

The Malyovishki Lakes (Bulgarian: Мальовишки езера [mɐˈʎɔviʃki ɛzɛˈra]) are a group of three glacial lakes, situated in the northwestern Rila Mountains in Bulgaria. They are located to the north of the summit of Malyovitsa (2,729 m) in the southwestern part of the homonymous cirque in the upper reaches of the Malyovitsa River, a right tributary of the Cherni Iskar, which is considered the main stem of Bulgaria's longest river that runs entirely within the country, the Iskar. They are terraced from the southwest to the northeast along 300 m.

The most southwestern Upper Malyovishko Lake is the second largest; it has an extended shape 90 to 40 m in size at an altitude of 2,368 m. The second one is at 125 m to the northeast of the Upper Malyovishko Lake and is located at an altitude of 2,355 m; it is the smallest of the three measuring 40 to 40 m. The lowest lake is located at 70 m to the northeast of the second one at an altitude of 2,336 m. Covering an area of 1 hectare, it is the largest in the group; it is 120 m long and 50 m wide and reaches a depth of 5.4 m.
