= Borovets =

Ski resort in Bulgaria

Coordinates: 42°15′52″N 23°36′25″E

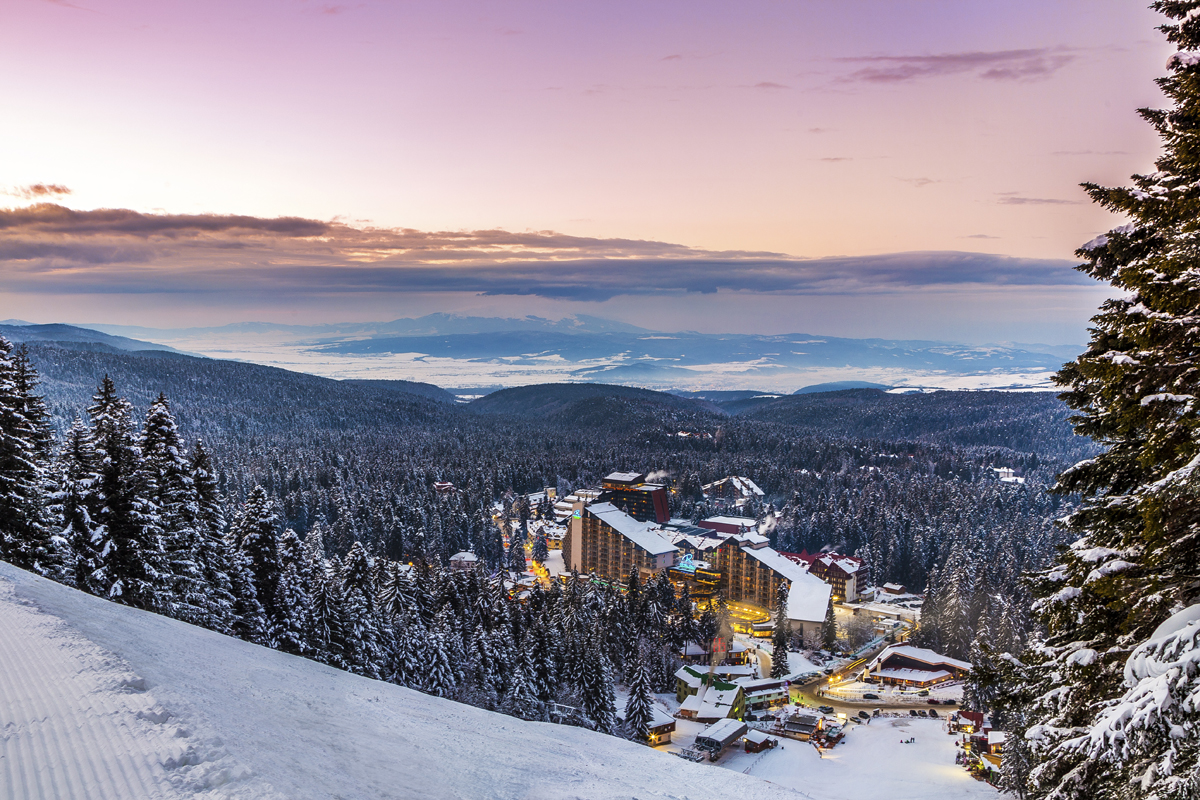
Borovets Town from the slopes

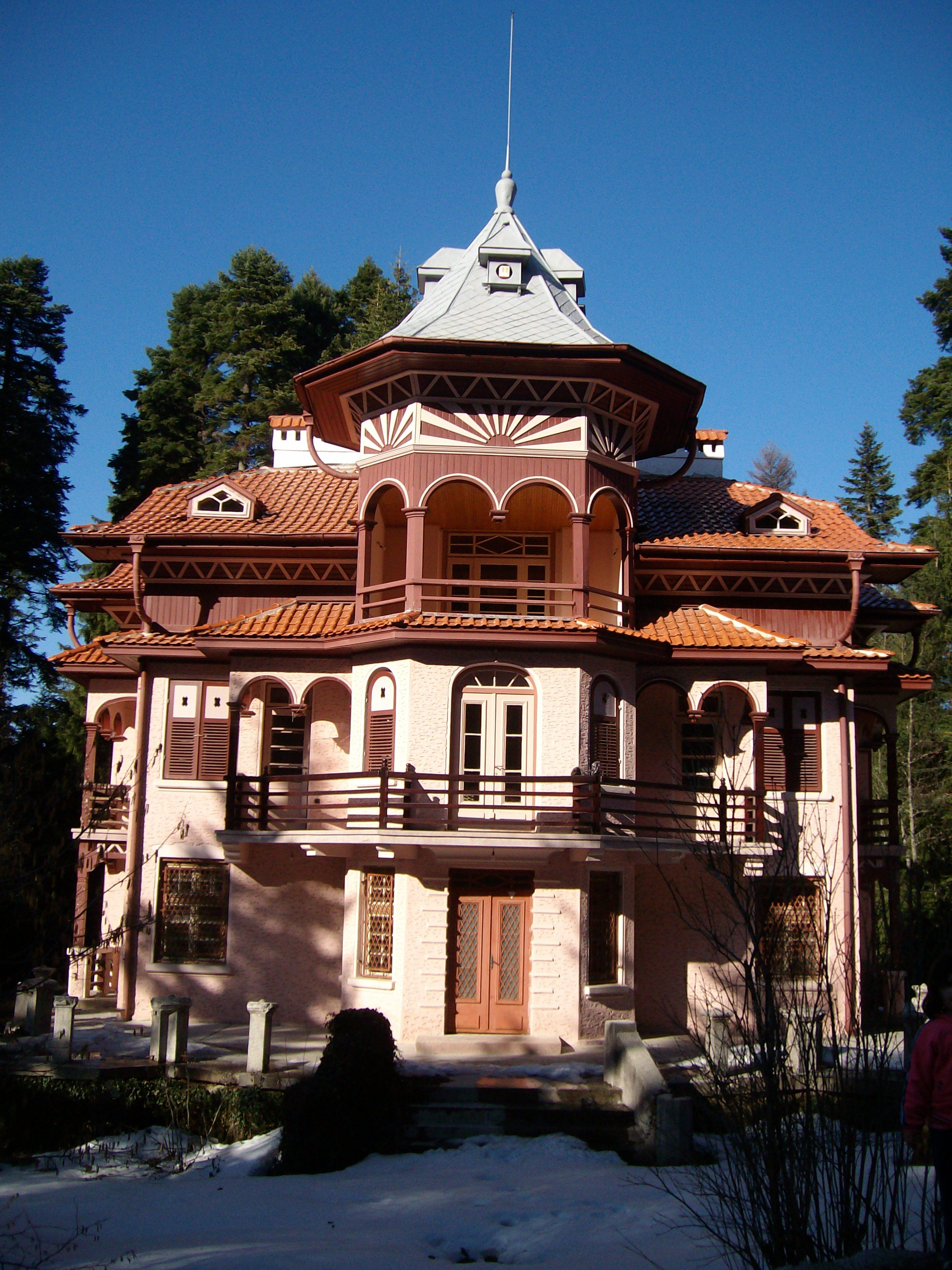
An old villa in Borovets

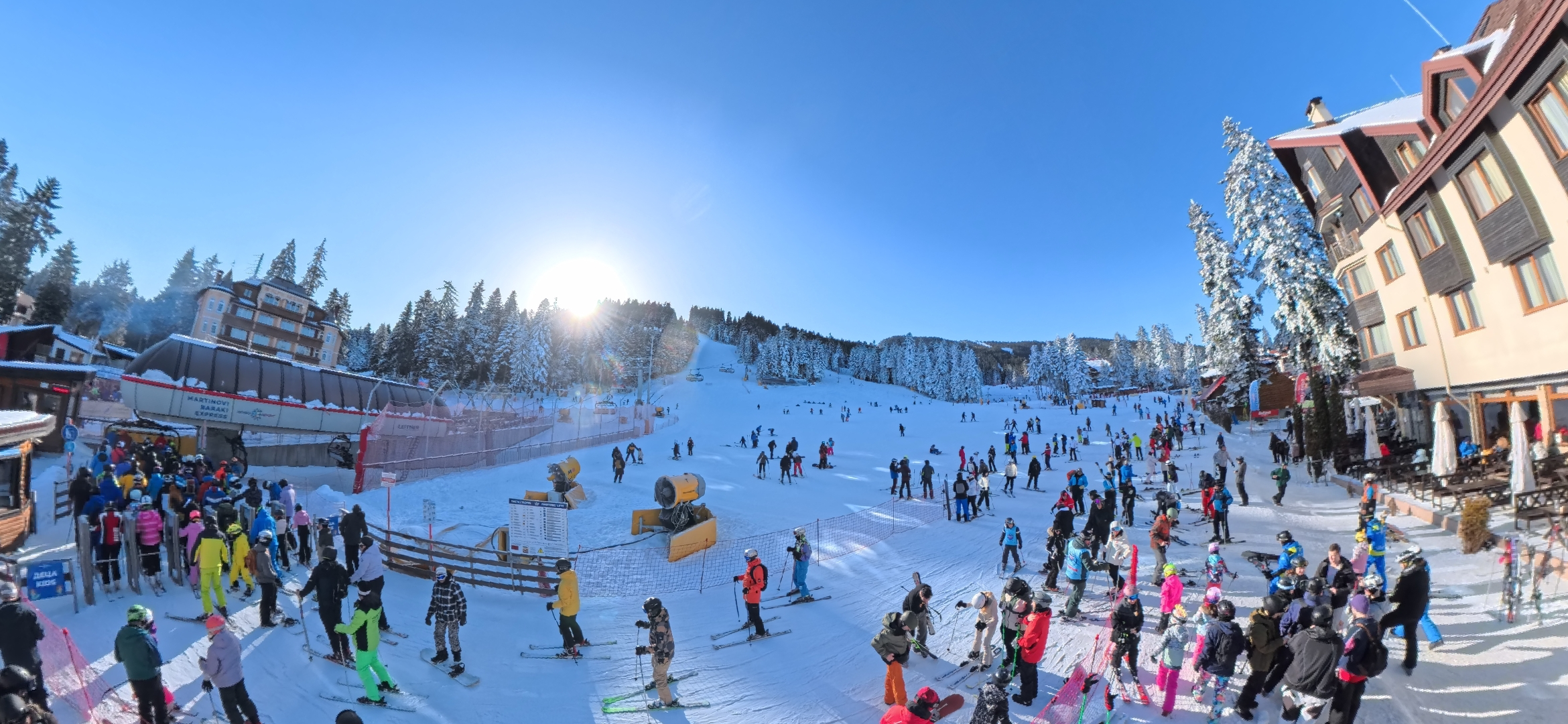
Borovets ski resort

Borovets (Bulgarian: Боровец [ˈbɔrovɛt͡s], known as Chamkoria (Чамкория [ˈt͡ʃam koˈrijɐ]) until the middle of the 20th century, is a mountain resort in Samokov Municipality in Sofia Province in Bulgaria. The closest town is Samokov.

== Geography ==
Borovets is situated on the northern slopes of Rila mountain, at an elevation of 1,350 m (4,430 ft). It is located approximately 10 km from Samokov and 70 km from Sofia.

=== Climate ===
Borovets has a humid continental climate (Dfb) with long, cold, and snowy winters and short, warm, and rainy summers with cool nights.

Climate data for Borovets
Month	Jan	Feb	Mar	Apr	May	Jun	Jul	Aug	Sep	Oct	Nov	Dec	Year
Mean daily maximum °C (°F)	0.6 (33.1)	2.2 (36.0)	5.4 (41.7)	11.1 (52.0)	16.2 (61.2)	19.6 (67.3)	22.1 (71.8)	22.3 (72.1)	17.9 (64.2)	12.6 (54.7)	7.3 (45.1)	2.6 (36.7)	11.7 (53.1)
Daily mean °C (°F)	−3.8 (25.2)	−2.5 (27.5)	0.7 (33.3)	6.1 (43.0)	11.0 (51.8)	14.9 (58.8)	16.8 (62.2)	16.8 (62.2)	12.5 (54.5)	7.9 (46.2)	2.6 (36.7)	−2.1 (28.2)	6.8 (44.2)
Mean daily minimum °C (°F)	−7.1 (19.2)	−6.2 (20.8)	−3.1 (26.4)	1.2 (34.2)	5.7 (42.3)	9.1 (48.4)	10.4 (50.7)	10.2 (50.4)	7.0 (44.6)	3.1 (37.6)	−1.2 (29.8)	−5.7 (21.7)	2.0 (35.6)
Average rainfall mm (inches)	59 (2.3)	53 (2.1)	62 (2.4)	82 (3.2)	114 (4.5)	121 (4.8)	91 (3.6)	62 (2.4)	56 (2.2)	68 (2.7)	67 (2.6)	60 (2.4)	895 (35.2)
Source: Stringmeteo.com

== History ==
Borovets is the oldest Bulgarian winter resort with its history dating back to 1896. Borovets was originally established at the end of the nineteenth century as a hunting place for the Bulgarian rulers when General Tantilov, then a lieutenant colonel, built the first vacation villa, and subsequently Ferdinand I of Bulgaria built the Tsarska Bistritsa palace.

In the 20th century, Borovets gradually developed into a modern ski resort with hotels, restaurants, bars and a network of ski runs and lifts along the slopes of the Rila Mountains, providing a whole range of winter sports. The resort has hosted World Cup twice, Alpine Skiing rounds (1981 and 1984). The 1993 Biathlon World Championships was held in Borovets.

== Super Borovets ==
The Super Borovets Project is an extension plan for the site, which plans to enlarge the town of Borovets and to encompass the nearby towns of Samokov and Beli Iskar. According to the project, the resort will be divided into three levels:

Level 1 or Low Borovets: A brand new development just outside Samokov, this area will cater for the less economically well-off tourists, but will have good connections and transport with Borovets and the main ski area. This project will provide around 5,000 hotel rooms.

Level 2 or Borovets: Consists of the existing Borovets with extensive investment and development. This will provide around 10,000 hotel rooms (approximately what Borovets currently provides) and will remain as the main accommodation area.

Level 3 or Super Borovets: This will cater for those looking for 5 star hotels and a luxury experience, however it will provide no more than 2,500 hotel rooms.

The current plan from the architects (subject to review and acceptance by the ecology team) is to expand the number of pistes by constructing 19 new pistes bringing the total ski-able area to around 90 km. To cope with the higher demand for ski-lifts and gondolas, 12 new ski-lifts will be built. One of these lifts will be a multi-station gondola which connects Borovets to Samokov allowing skiers easy access to the slopes from the Lower Borovets development site.

The project was launched in 2004 and was to be completed by 2009, however several setbacks have delayed it. The project was then given the go-ahead in October 2007, amidst opposition from environmentalists. However, by February 2010, still nothing had happened with the whole project mired in financial problems as a result of the Great Recession, and the project's backers denying that work had restarted.

== Winter sports ==
The ski resort is at an altitude of 1350 m. 58 km of marked pistes cover the generally north facing slopes up to an altitude of 2560 m, with many runs terminating near the village center allowing skiers to ski almost to their hotel door. The longest run is a gentle 12 km return to the resort along the maintenance road.

=== Downhill skiing ===
Borovets Ski Slopes

Ski Run	Difficulty	Length (m)	Inclination (m)
Sitnyakovo ski track	Green and blue	6000	0
Sitnyakovo 1a	Blue	5800	400
Martinovi Baraki 5	Green	5000	0
Sitnyakovo 1b	Red	4000	230
Sitnyakovo 2	Red	4000	250
Yastrebets 1	Black	2300	860
Yastrebets 2	Red	3000	650
Yastrebets 3	Red	2350	617
Markujik 2A	Red	1300	280
Martinovi Baraki 3	Red	1260	320
Markujik 3	Red	1240	390
Martinovi Baraki 4	Black	1240	302
Markujik 1	Red	1220	220
Martinovi Baraki 1	Black	1160	340
Martinovi Baraki 2	Red	1160	280
Sitnyakovo 3	Red	1000	220
Lavinata	Black	830	0
Yastrebets	Black	800	0
Markujik	Green	600	0
Borovets	Cross Country	0	0

=== Lifts ===
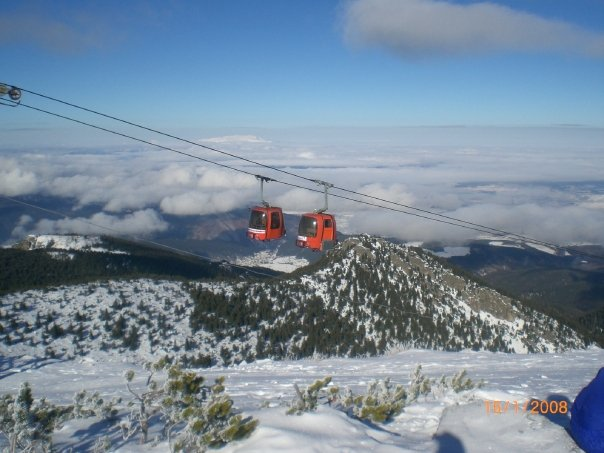
The Gondola in Borovets

All ski lifts are open 8.30 am to 6.30 pm. Each lift closes for technical checks and maintenance for half a day each week and for 1 full day each month, see local signs for dates and times for each lift.

Borovets Lifts

Ski Run/Lift	Type	Length (m)	Elevation (m)
Gondola Yastrebets	Gondola	4827	1054
Yastrebetz Express	4-seat	1786	439
Sitnyakovo Express	4-seat	2050	609
Markudjik 2	4-seat	950	342
Martinovi Baraki	6-seat	1209	313
Markujik 3	Drag	1031	366
Markujik 1	Drag	903	223
Markujik 0 - beginners piste	Drag	500	42
Sitnyakovo	Drag	280	70
Rila	Drag	180	33
Iglika	Drag	196	50
Rotata	Drag	500	54

The lift infrastructure of the resort is very well developed by drag lifts, baby tows, seat chain lifts, plus a gondola lift. 1 six-seat Gondola lift, 2 High Speed Quad Chair lifts, 1 Fixed Grip Quad Chair lift, 10 Surface ski lifts and 9 tow lifts. As for the 6-person gondola lift, it takes you to the Yastrebets peak on 2363 m above sea level. The difference in altitude is approx. 1046 m and length of route is 4827 m. The gondola lift has a capacity of 1200 persons per hour. The journey takes around 20 minutes. The total capacity of all tow lifts of Borovets is 8150 persons per hour.

A 200-meter carpet lift takes the skiers from ski center Markudjik to the upper station of the gondola lift "Yastrebetz"; and the widened 10 km long Musala Pathway provides an easy way to return to the resort.

=== Night skiing ===
For night skiing there is a different lift pass that has to be bought separately at the kiosks on the pistes.

=== Cross-country skiing ===
The resort also offers biathlon facilities for training and competitions. 33 km of cross country trails are designed according to the requirements of FIS (Federation Internationale de Ski), although they cancelled the last two cross-country events to be held in Borovets, in 2009 and 2010.

== Landmarks ==
The Black Rock of Chamkoria is located near the resort of Borovets and is a huge stone rock whose walls rise above the valley of the Golyama Slivnitsa River. The distance from the top to its foot is 135 m. At its upper part is a flat rocky ground, secured by a metal railing, from which there is a scenic view of the mountain slopes and the forested abyss. The view is interspersed by the fog between the trees and the rock formations.

In this abyss after September 9, 1944, 60–70 people were killed without trial and sentence (their exact number is still unknown) by Samokov, the villages of Beli Iskar and Belchin. For the victims of the communist regime, writer Georgi Markov is writing a book entitled The Black Rock. An iron cross was erected on the frontal site in memory of those who died.
