= Verila =

Mountain range in Bulgaria

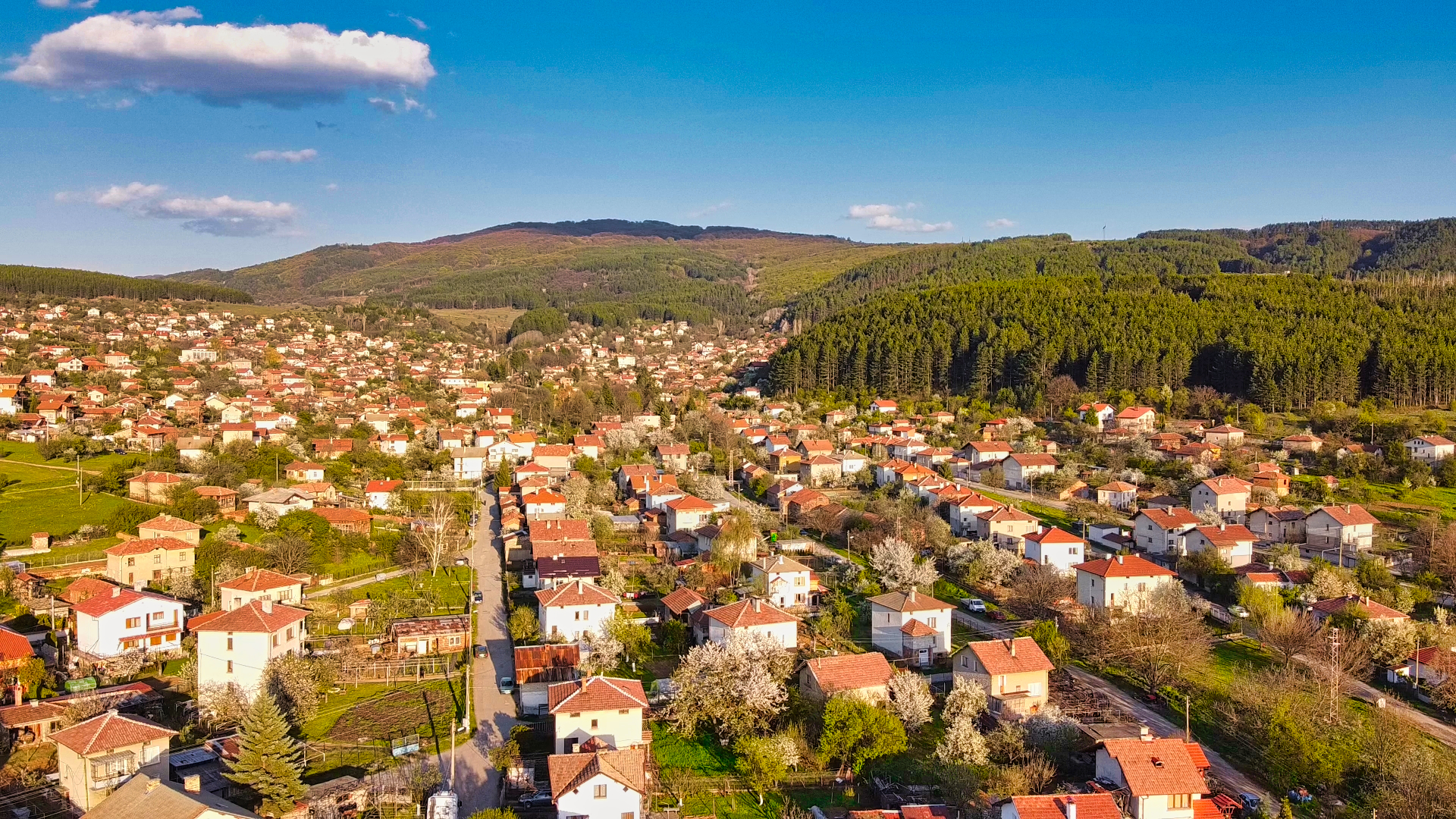
- Verila seen from the village of Dren

Highest point
- Elevation: 1,415 m (4,642 ft)
- Coordinates: 42°23′30″N 23°15′49″E

Naming
- Native name: Верила (Bulgarian)

Geography
- Location within Bulgaria
- Location: Bulgaria

Verila (Bulgarian: Верила [vɛˈriɫɐ]) is a mountain range in western Bulgaria with an altitude of 1,415 meters above sea level. It is part of the Ruy–Verila mountain chain. Verila Glacier on Livingston Island in the South Shetland Islands, Antarctica is named after it.

== Geography ==
Verila straddles in northwest–southeast direction for about 20 km; its maximum width is 12 km. To the north the Bukapreslapska Saddle (1,090 m) links it the mountain range of Vitosha; to the south the Klisura Saddle (1,025 m) forms the connection to Rila, the highest mountain range in the Balkan Peninsula. Its slopes descend to the Radomir Valley to the northwest, the Dupnitsa Valley to the southwest, and the Samokov Valley to the northeast. It has a flat main ridge with short indented slopes. The highest summit is Golyam Debelets (1,415 m), rising east of the depopulated village of Yarebkovitsa.

Verila is built up of crystalline rocks, mainly gneiss and schists. The climate is temperate continental with cold winter and cool summer. The main watershed divide of the Balkan Peninsula, separating the Black Sea drainage basin to the north and the Aegean Sea one to the south, runs along the mountain range. The streams on the northeastern slopes drain into the river Palakaria, a left tributary of the Iskar of the Black Sea drainage; those on the southwestern slopes feed several left tributaries of the Struma of the Aegean basin. The predominant soils are cinnamon and brown forest soils. Verila is covered with deciduous forests dominated by beech, oak and hornbeam species, as well as with pastures.

== Settlements and transport ==
Administratively, the mountain range falls in Sofia, Pernik and Kyustendil Provinces. There are seven villages on its foothills and slopes — Belchin, Klisura, Lisets and Yarebkovitsa in Sofia Province, Gorna Dikanya and Dren in Pernik Province, and Topolnitsa in Kyustendil Province. Along its southern foothills through the Klisura Saddle passes an 8.2 km stretch of the second class II-82 road Sofia–Samokov–Kostenets. The E4 European long distance path crossing much of Europe runs through Verila.
