= Malyovitsa =

Mountain in southwestern Bulgaria

Malyovitsa (Мальовица)
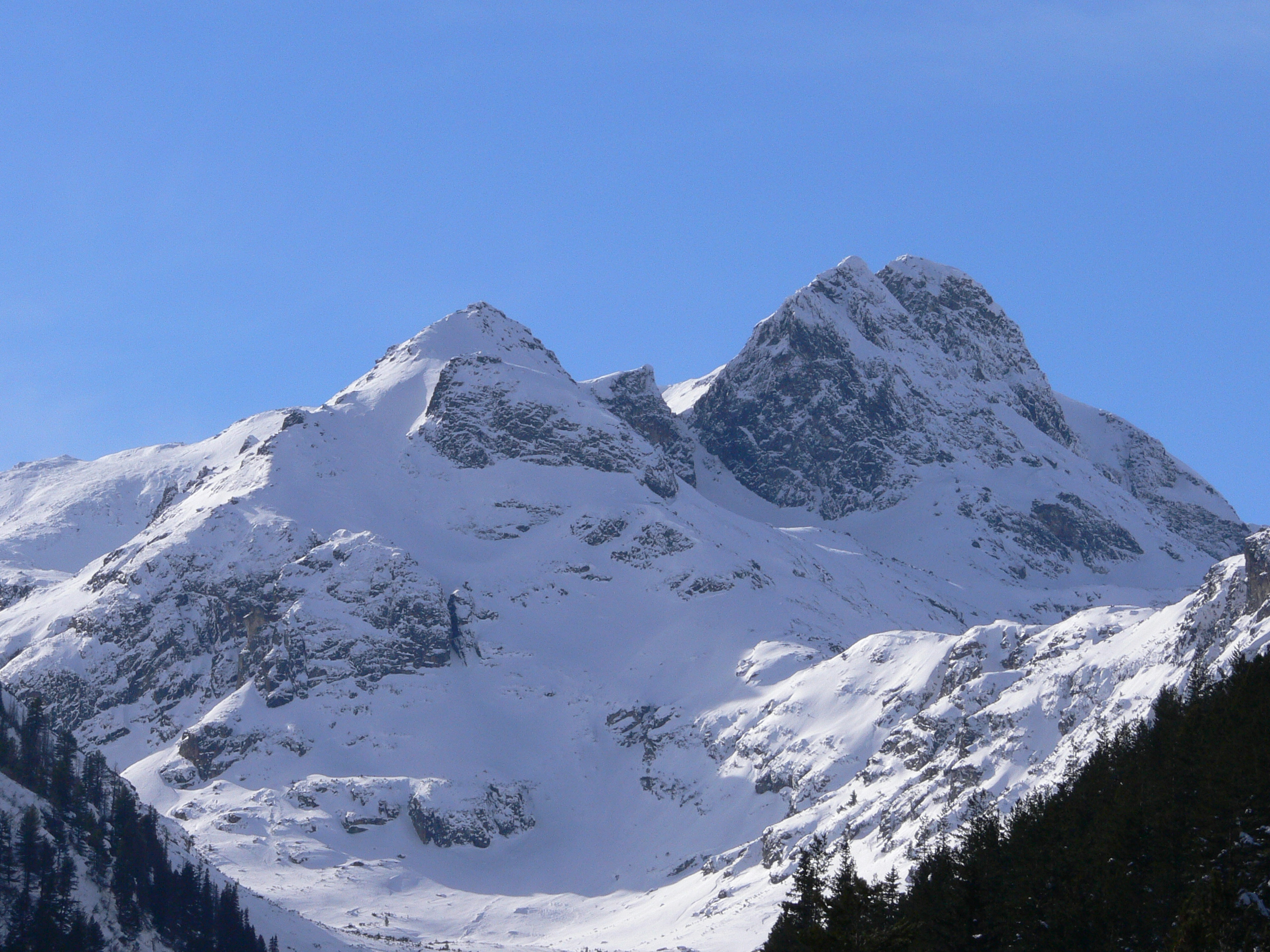
- Malyovitsa in winter

Highest point
- Elevation: 2,729 m (8,953 ft)
- Prominence: 255 m (837 ft)
- Coordinates: 42°10′25.09″N 23°21′47.1″E

Geography
- Location: Bulgaria
- Parent range: Rila Mountains

Malyovitsa (Bulgarian: Мальовица [mɐˈʎɔvit͡sɐ]) is a peak in the northwestern part of the Rila Mountain in southwestern Bulgaria. It is 2,729 m (8,953 ft) high and is one of the most popular tourist regions in the mountain. Its northern and eastern slopes are steep and almost inaccessible while the southern and south-western slopes are more oblique. The Rila Monastery is situated at its southern foothills facing the valley of the Rilska River, and Malyovitsa Ski Centre — with two downhill tracks and two ski drags — is to the north. The main starting point for treks in the region is Malyovitsa Hut at an altitude of 1,700 m (5,600 ft) at about 2 hours walk from the top of the summit. The three Malyovishki Lakes are situated to the north of the summit, while to the southeast the Elenski Lakes, also three, are located in a deep cirque.

The Malyovitsa region is the cradle of Bulgarian rock climbing and mountaineering. The first organized expeditions were made in 1921–22 by tourists from the town of Samokov. The imposant north wall of the summit was first climbed in 1938 by Konstantin Savadzhiev and Georgi Stoimenov (about 200 m (660 ft), grade UIAA V+). That was the greatest success of Bulgarian climbers for its time and is deemed birth of Bulgarian alpine mountaineering. Later other walls in the region were climbed too with the most difficult routes being made in the 1970s. In the last 15 years, Malyovitsa region has become very attractive rock-climbing district with the possibilities it gives for mountaineering and sport rock climbing.

Other interesting walls and summits in the vicinity are: Zlia Zab (200 m (660 ft) wall with one of the most famous climbing routes in the country — Vezhdite), Dvuglav (a 450 m (1,480 ft) high wall, with climbing routes often over 500 m (1,600 ft) long), Iglata, Dyavolski Igli (several aretes with the hardest climbs in the region), Ushite and others. A wall that is available for less experienced rock-climbers is "Kuklata". It is situated across Malyovitsa Hut, 10 minutes walking, and the main part of its tours is bolted.

Malyovitsa Crag on Livingston Island in the South Shetland Islands, Antarctica is named after Malyovitsa.

== Gallery ==
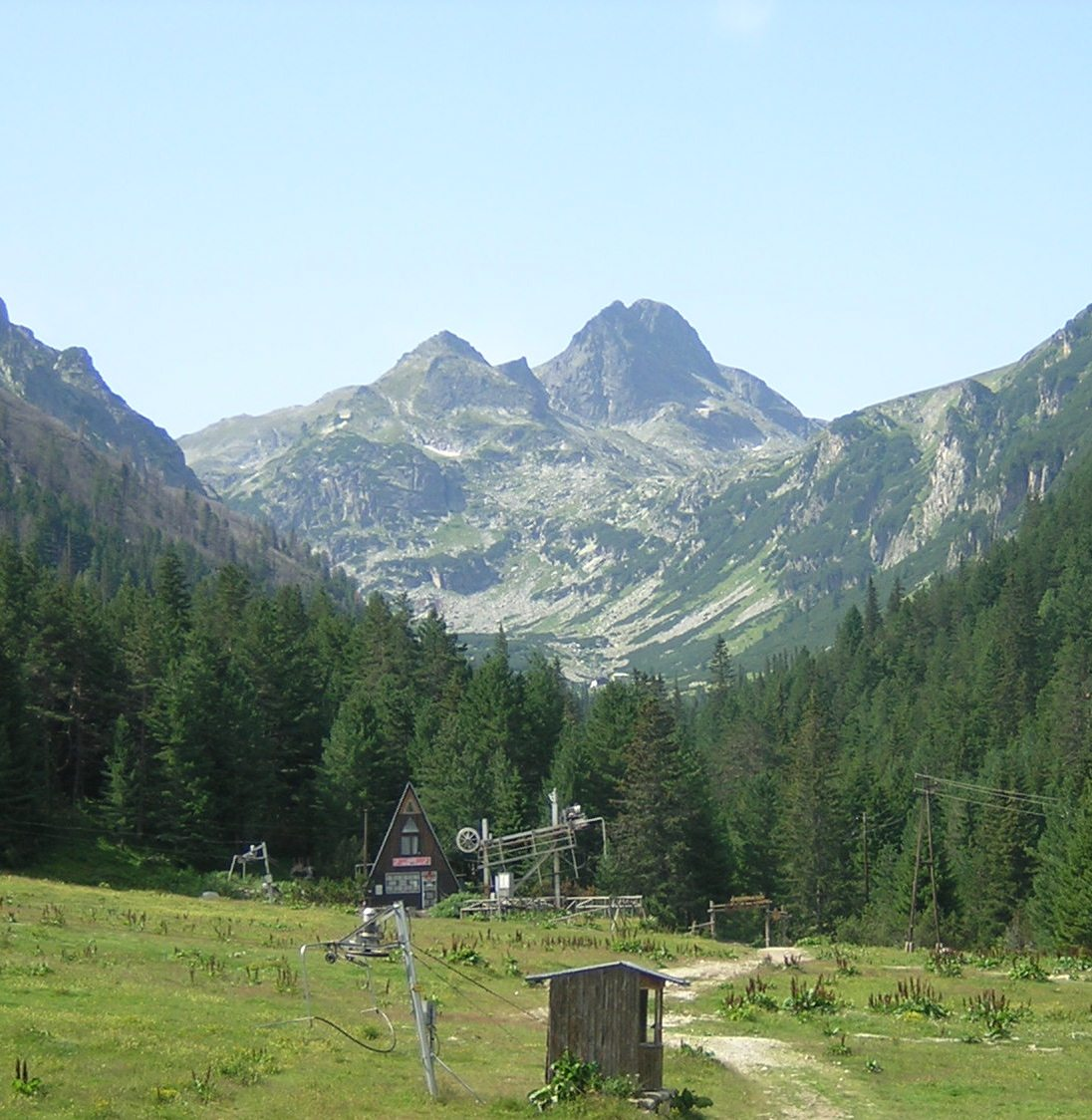

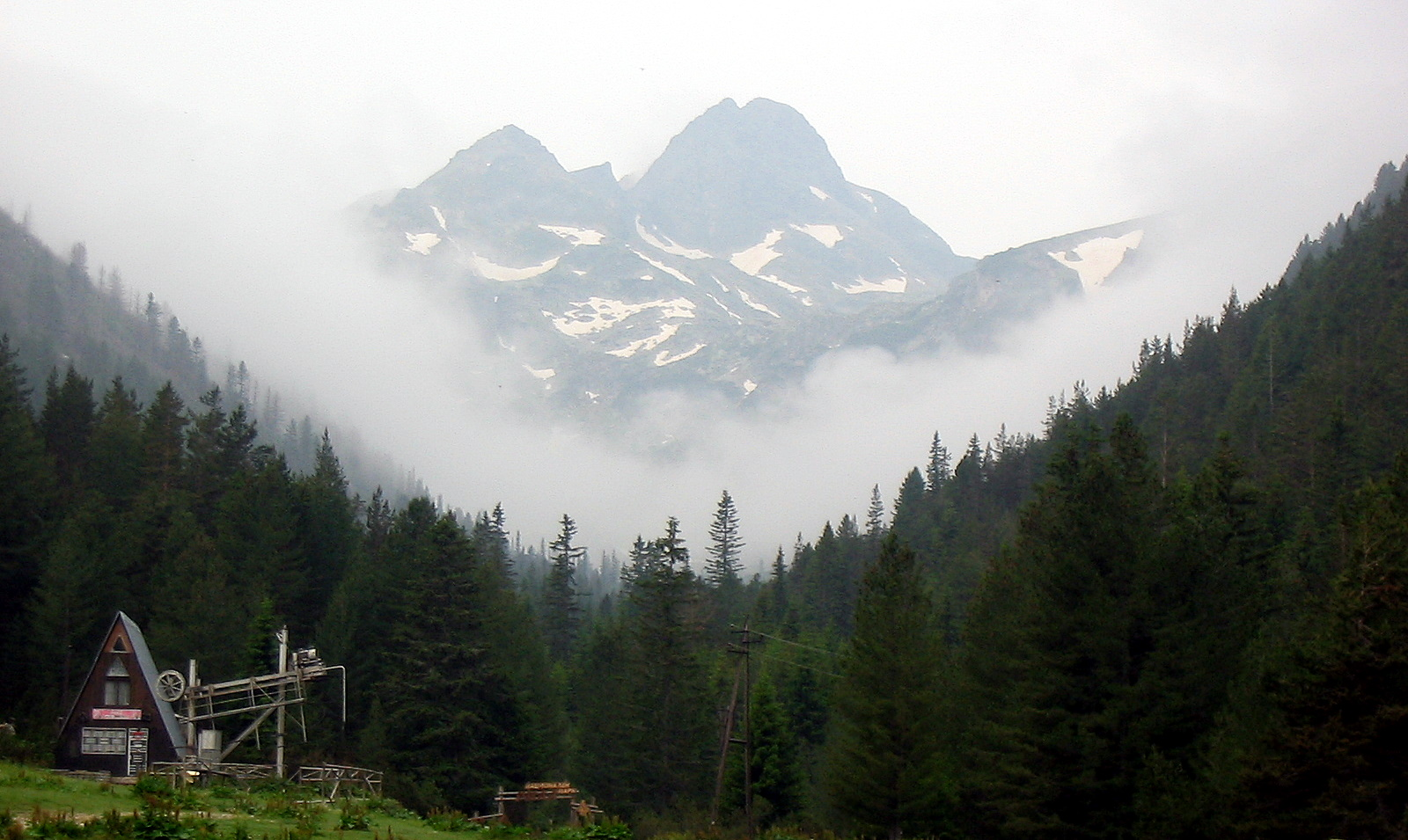

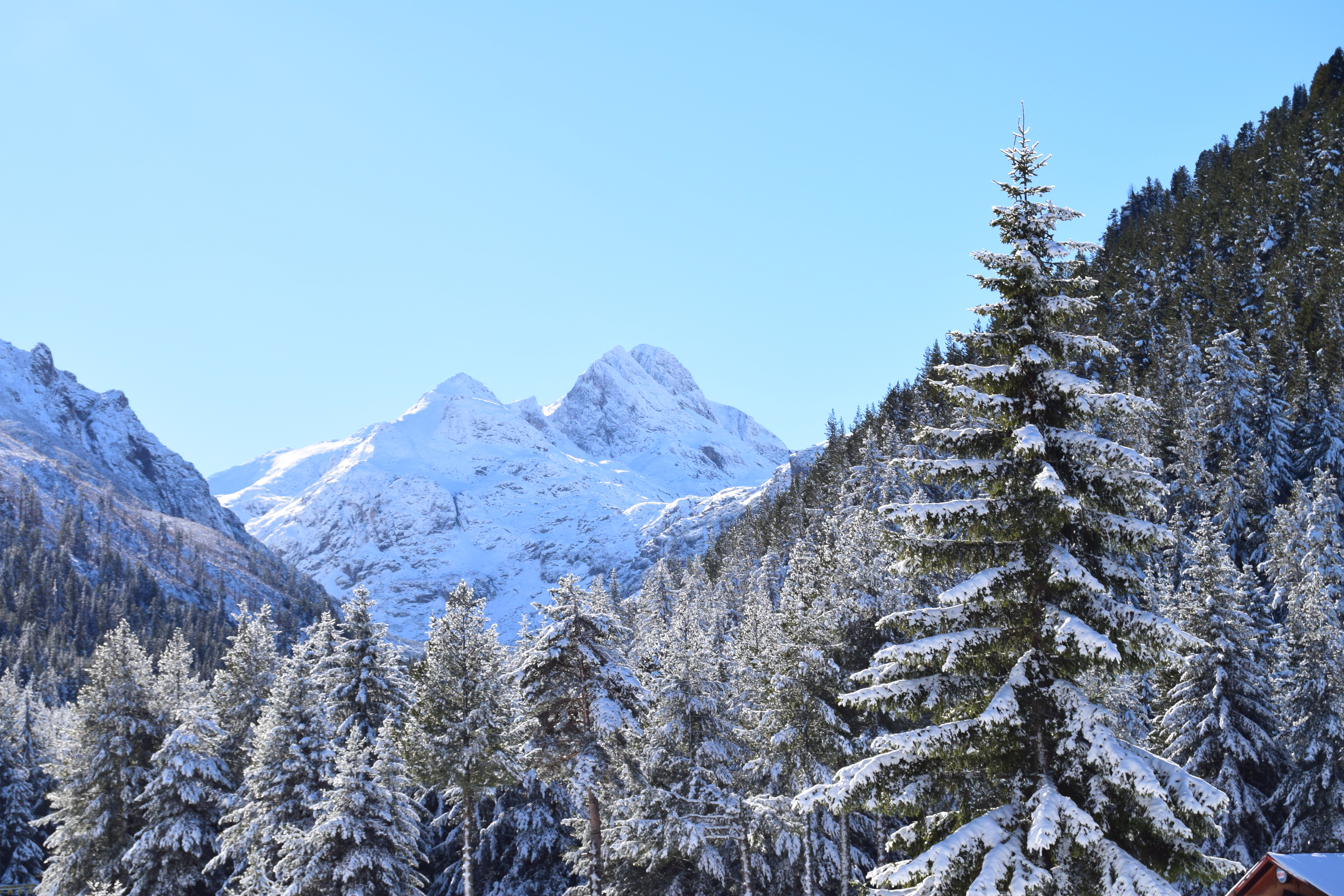

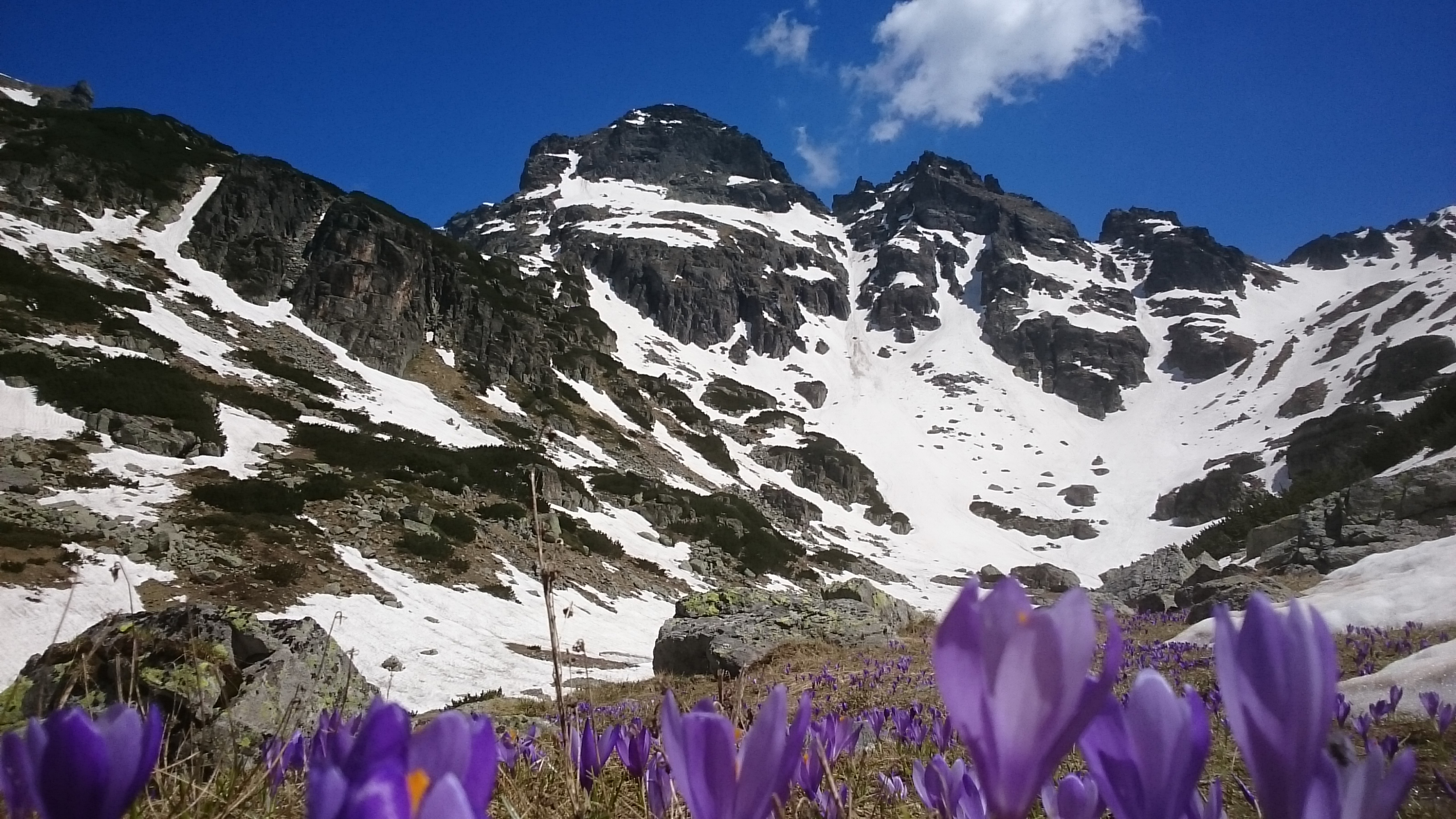
