= II-62 road (Bulgaria) =

Road in Bulgaria

Republic Road I-62
- Републикански път I-62

Route information
- Length: 80 km (50 mi)

Major junctions
- From: Km 25.7 of I-6, near Kyustendil
- To: Km 37.6 of II-82, Samokov

Location
- Country: Bulgaria
- Towns: Dupnitsa, Samokov

Highway system
- Highways in Bulgaria

Republican Road II-62 (Bulgarian: Републикански път II-62) is a 2nd class road in Bulgaria, running in general direction northeast–southwest through the territory of Kyustendil and Sofia Provinces. Its length is 80 km.

== Route description ==
The road starts at Km 25.7 of the first class I-6 road northeast of the city of Kyustendil and heads south to the village of Piperkov Chiflik and then turns east-southeast through the Kyustendil Valley. It passes through the villages of Bagrentsi and Novi Chiflik, reaches Nevestino, where it crosses the river Struma and continues in direction east-northeast along the southern slopes of the Konyavska Planina. West of the town of Dupnitsa the road descends to the valley of the river Dzherman, a left tributary of the Struma, turns north and for 4.3 km it overlaps with the first class I-1 road. In the northern reaches of Dupnitsa the road turns east, crosses the Dzherman and the industrial zone of the town and continues east through the Dupnitsa Valley. After the junction for the village of Saparevo the road exits the valley, ascends the Klisura Saddle between the mountain ranges of Verila to the north and Rila to the south, and then descends to the Samokov Valley. There it runs eastwards through the southern part of the valley until the town of Samokov, where it reaches its terminus at Km 37.6 of the second class II-82 road.
