= Rila =

Mountain range in Bulgaria

Rila Mountains
- Bulgarian: Рила
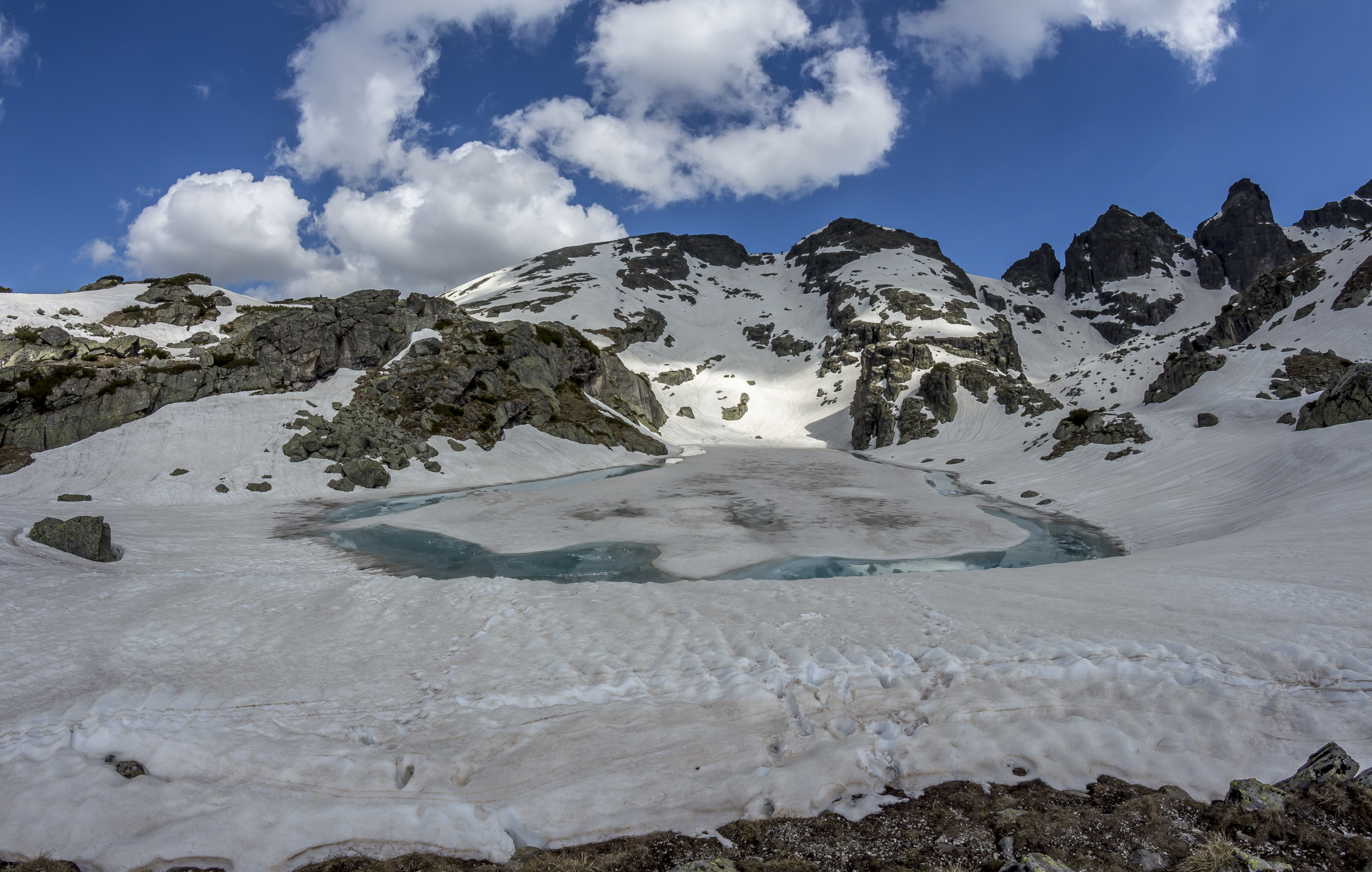
- Strashnoto ezero (The Dreadful Lake)

Highest point
- Peak: Musala
- Elevation: 2,925 m (9,596 ft)
- Coordinates: 42°10′46″N 23°35′6″E

Dimensions
- Length: 75 km (47 mi) west-east
- Width: 50 km (31 mi) north-south
- Area: 2,629 km^{2} (1,015 mi^{2})

Geography
- Country: Bulgaria
- Range coordinates: 42°6′N 23°30′E

Geology
- Rock type(s): granite, gneiss, quartz

Rila (Bulgarian: Рила, pronounced [ˈriɫɐ]) is the highest mountain range of Bulgaria, the Balkan Peninsula, and of Southeast Europe. It is situated in southwestern Bulgaria and forms part of the Rila–Rhodope Massif. The highest summit is Musala at an elevation of 2,925 m which makes Rila the sixth highest mountain range in Europe after the Caucasus, the Alps, Sierra Nevada, the Pyrenees and Mount Etna, and the highest one between the Alps and the Caucasus. It spans a territory of 2,629 km^{2} with an average elevation of 1487 m. The mountain is believed to have been named after the river of the same name, which comes from the Old Bulgarian verb "рыти" meaning "to grub".

Rila has abundant water resources. Some of the Balkans' longest and deepest rivers originate from Rila, including the Maritsa, Iskar and Mesta rivers. Bulgaria's main water divide separating the Black Sea and the Aegean Sea drainage systems follows the main ridge of Rila. The mountain range is dotted with almost 200 glacial lakes such as the renowned Seven Rila Lakes, and is rich in hot springs in the fault areas at the foothills, including the hottest spring in South-eastern Europe in Sapareva Banya.

The mountain range has varied flora and fauna with a number of endemic and relict species and some of the best preserved forests in the country. The biodiversity and the pristine landscapes are protected by Rila National Park which covers much of the mountain; the rest lies within Rila Monastery Nature Park. In addition, there are five nature reserves: Parangalitsa, Central Rila Reserve, Rila Monastery Forest, Ibar and Skakavitsa.

The most recognisable landmark of the mountain range is the Rila Monastery, Bulgaria's largest and most important monastery, founded in the 10th century by Saint John of Rila. Due to its outstanding cultural and spiritual value it was declared a UNESCO World Heritage Site in 1983. Rila is also a popular destination for hiking, winter sports and spa tourism, hosting the nation's oldest ski resort Borovets, as well as numerous hiking trails. Some of the most important hydro power stations in Bulgaria are situated in the eastern part of the mountain range, including the Belmeken–Sestrimo–Chaira Hydropower Cascade (1,599 MW), the largest and most complex hydroelectric complex in Bulgaria.

== Geography ==
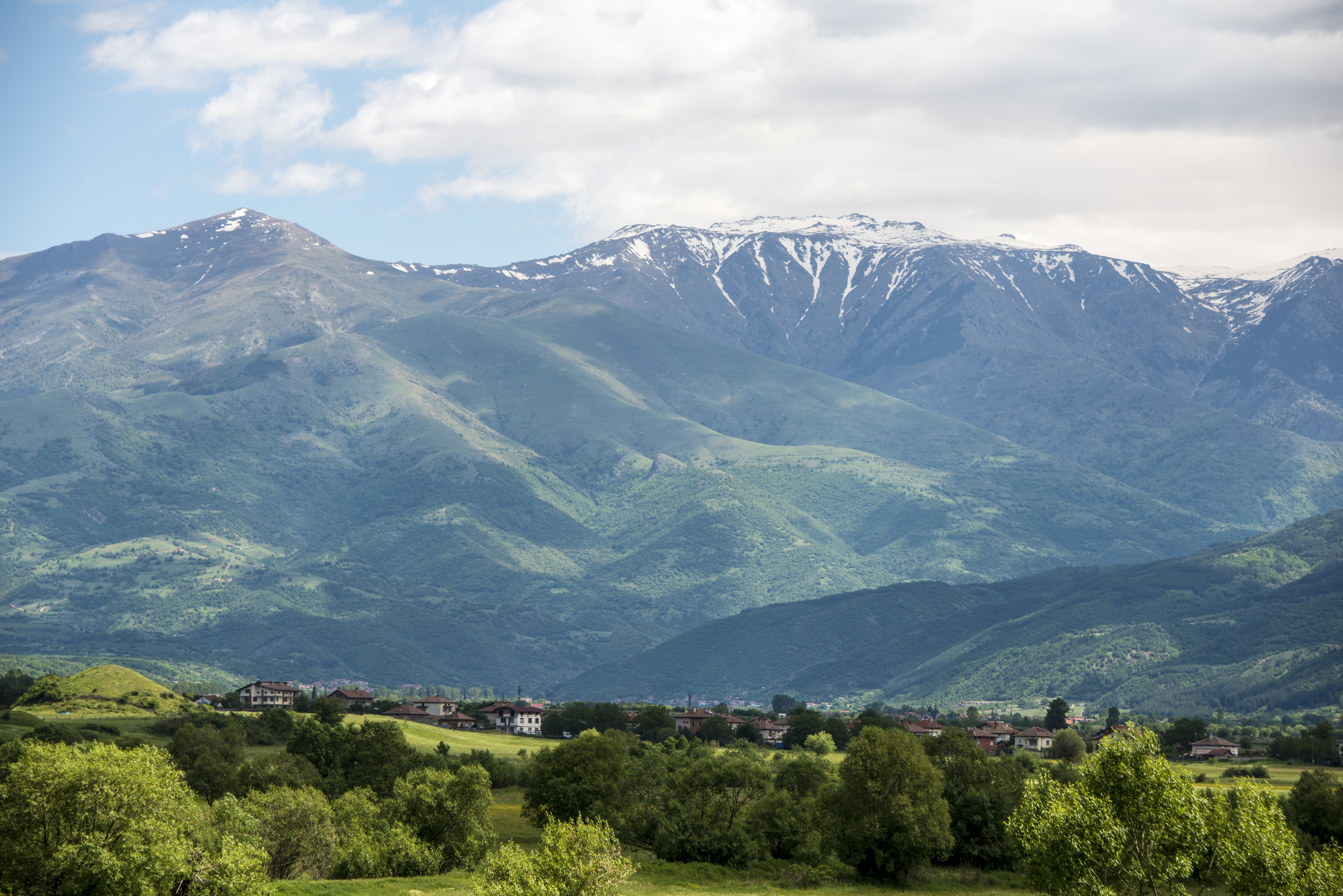
A view to Rila

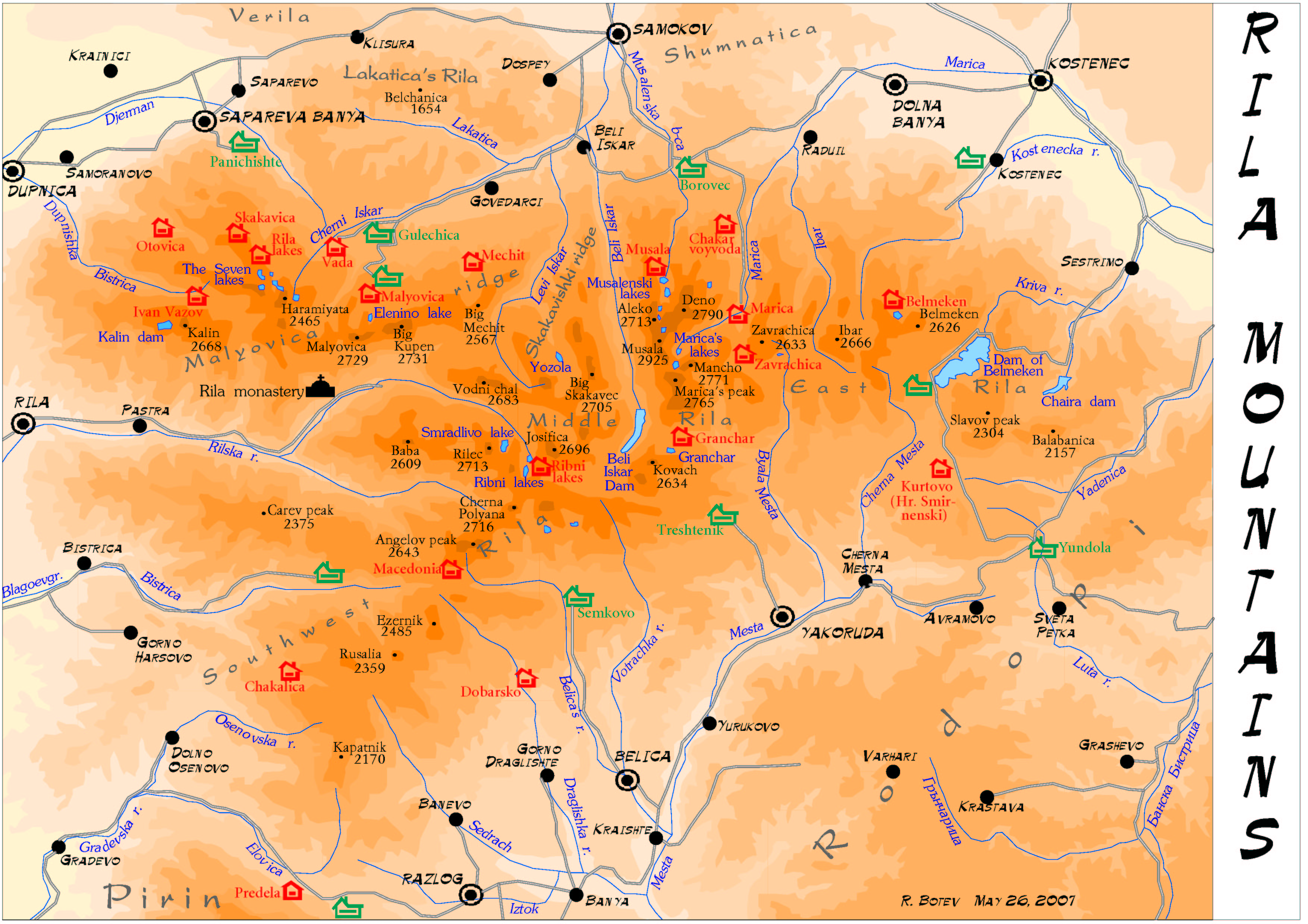
A map of Rila

=== Overview ===
Rila is a mountain range in south-western Bulgaria, part of the Rila–Rhodope Massif. It is situated between five valleys – Dupnitsa Valley to the north-west, Samokov Valley to the north, Kostenets–Dolna Banya Valley to the north-east, Razlog Valley to the south and Blagoevgrad Valley to the south-west. Five saddles link Rila to the surrounding mountain ranges – Klisura Saddle (1,025 m) with Verila to the north-west, Borovets Saddle (1,305 m) with Sredna Gora to the north, Yundola (1,375 m) and Avramovo Saddles (1,295 m) with the Rhodope Mountains to the south-east and Predel Saddle (1,140 m) with Pirin to the south. Within these limits Rila spans an area of 2,629 km^{2} and has an average elevation of 1,487 m. The high elevation zone over 1,600 m forms about 50% of the total territory. There are over 140 main peaks above 2,000 m.

With an elevation of 2,925 m at Musala, Rila is the highest mountain range in Bulgaria and the Balkan Peninsula, and the sixth highest in Europe after the Caucasus, the Alps, Sierra Nevada, the Pyrenees and Mount Etna. Musala is the fourth most isolated peak in continental Europe after Mont Blanc, Mount Elbrus and Galdhøpiggen raising at a distance of 810 km from the nearest point of the same elevation. With a prominence of 2,473 m, Musala ranks seventh among Europe's ultra-prominent peaks.

=== Division ===
The mountain range is divided into four distinct parts. East Rila, known also as Musala Rila, is the largest and highest subdivision, situated between the valleys of the rivers Beli Iskar and Belishka. It is formed of two main ridges. The Musala Ridge spans in north–south direction between the valleys of Beli Iskar and Maritsa; the Ibar Ridge runs in west–east direction from the summit of Marishki Chal to the Avramovo Saddle. It covers 37% of the mountain's territory and contains the highest summit in the range — Musala (2,925 m), as well as 12 of the 18 summits over 2,700 m — Irechek (2,852 m), Deno (2,790 m), Mancho (2,771 m) and others; there are 46 peaks over 2,100 m. East Rila contains a number of glacial lake groups, including Musala Lakes and Marichini Lakes, as well as the nation's largest ski resort Borovets.

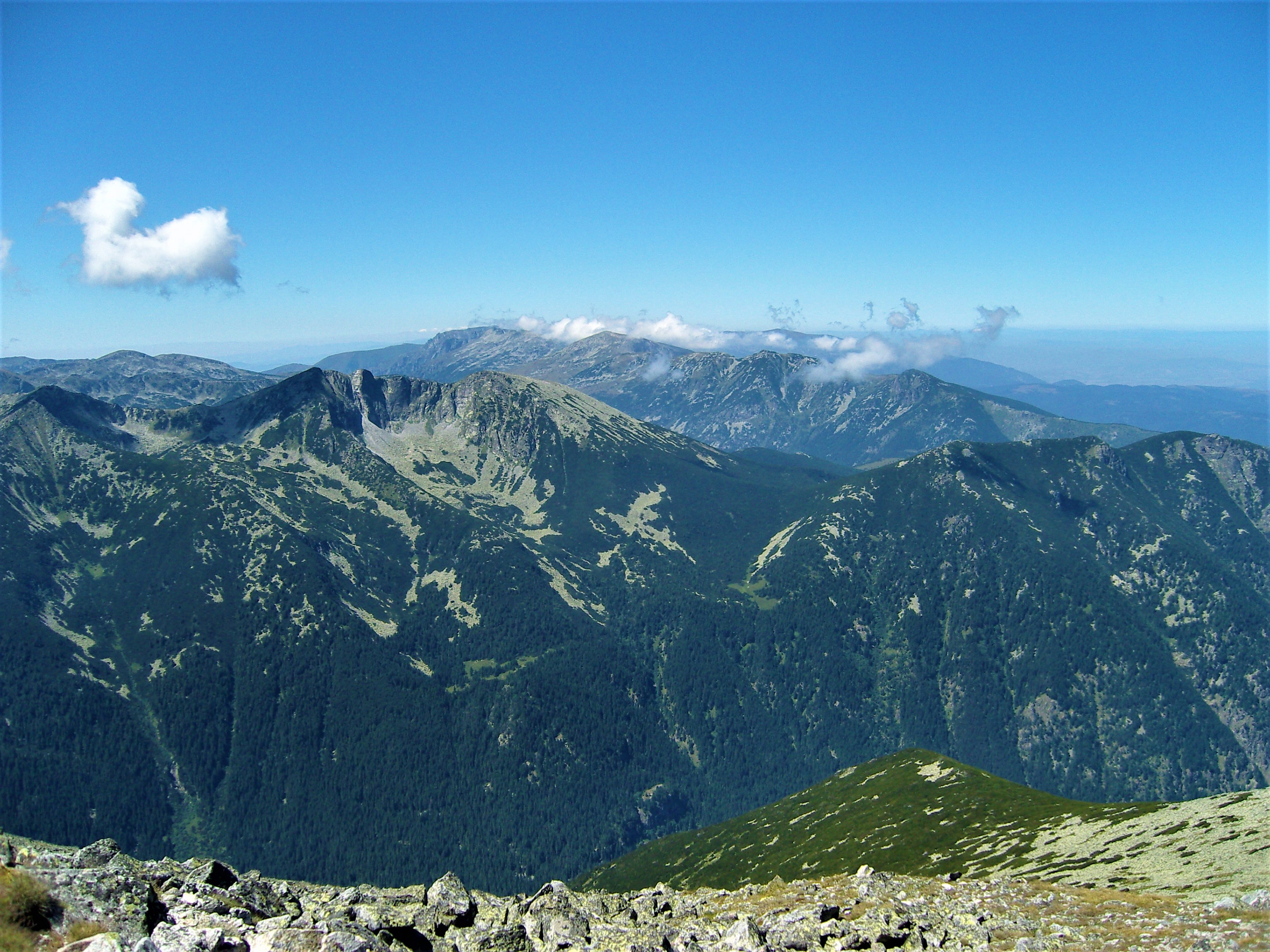
A view from Musala

Central Rila, known also as Skakavitsa Rila, is the smallest subdivision, covering 9% of the total area of Rila but has the most Alpine character and the highest average elevation — 2,077 m. It stretches between the valleys of the rivers Beli Iskar, Cherni Iskar, Levi Iskar, Iliyna and Rilska. The later divides the two main ridges in Central Rila, Skakavitsa and Rilets. The highest summit is Cherna Polyana (2,716 m); other important peaks are Skalata, Small and Big Skakavets, Rilets; there are 28 peaks over 2,100 m. This subdivision is renowned mainly for the glacial lakes Ribni, Dzhendemski, Manastirski, as well as the largest glacial lake in the Balkan Peninsula — Smradlivo Lake.

Northwest Rila, known also as Malyovitsa Rila, occupies about 24% of Rila and is situated between the valleys of Rilska to the south, Levi Iskar to the east, Samokov to the north-east and Dupnitsa to the west. Its much lower northern section is called Lakatitska Rila. It is linked with the Verila mountain range to the north through the Klisura Saddle, and with Central Rila to the east through the Kobilino Branishte saddle. The average elevation is 1,556 m; the highest summit is Mount Golyiam Kupen at an elevation of 2731 m. There are 29 peaks over 2,100 m. This subdivision is known for its rugged peaks and picturesque lakes in the Alpine zone that include the Seven Rila Lakes and the Urdini Lakes. Central Rila includes the mountain's highest waterfall, Skakavitsa (70 m).

Southwest Rila stretches between the valleys of the Rilska, Iliyna and Belishka rivers to the north, the Predel Saddle that separates it from Pirin to the south, and Simitli and Blagoevgrad valleys to the west. It covers about 30% of the area of the mountain range. With an average elevation of 1,307 m, it has the lowest elevation in Rila. The highest summit is Angelov Peak (2,643 m). The Blagoevgradska Bistritsa River divides it in two distinct ridges to the north and to the south. Apart from its northernmost part, Southwest Rila does not have the Alpine character of the other three subdivisions. The biosphere reserve Parangalitsa is situated there.

== Geology, relief and summits ==
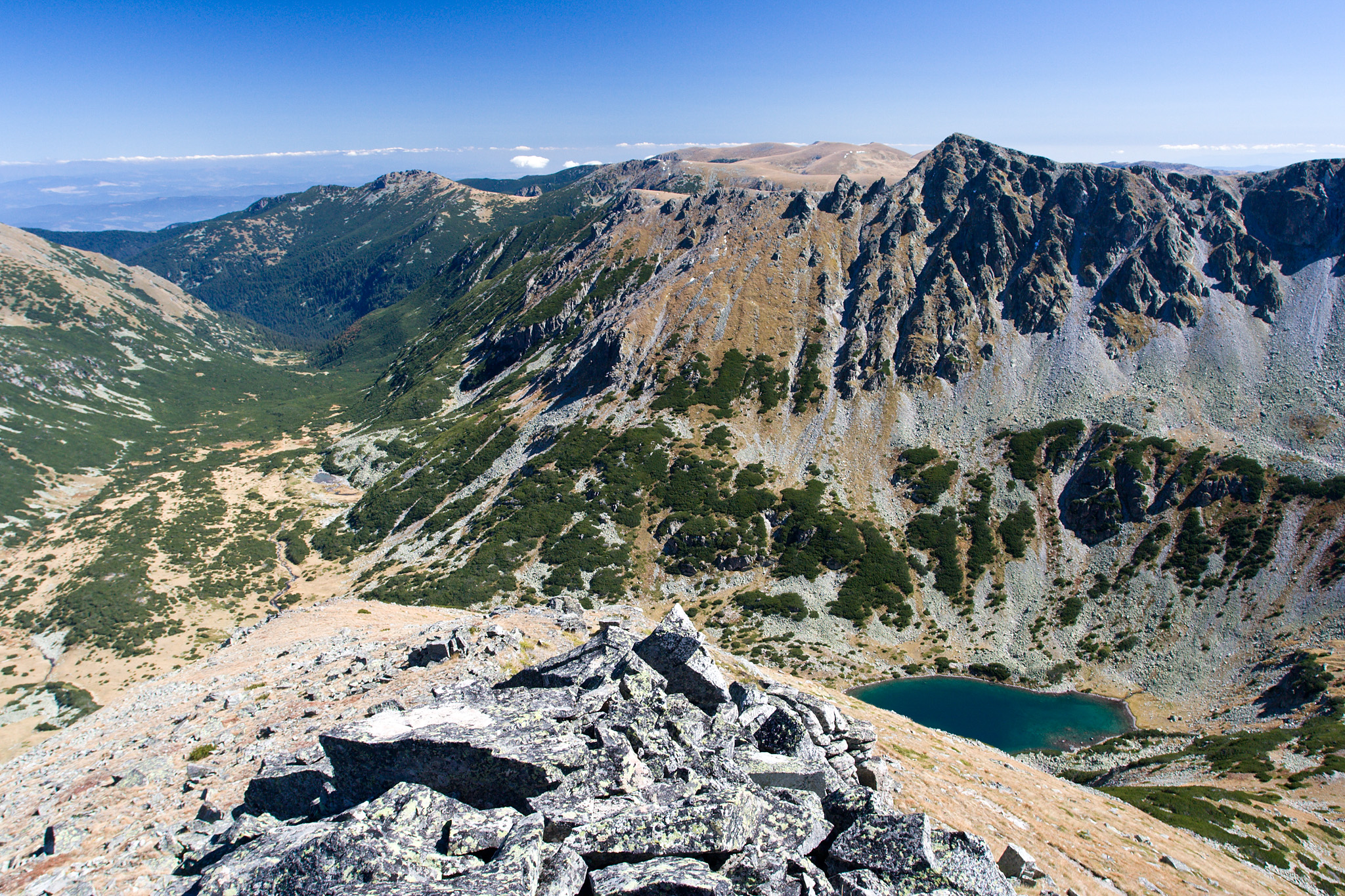
The cirque of the Marichini Lakes

Rila is a fault-block mountain and represents a crescent-shaped horst with two fault systems — concentric and radial. It is part of the oldest land in the Balkans, the Macedonian–Thracian Massif. The mountain range is formed mainly by metamorphic and intrusive rocks. The core of Rila is built up predominantly by granite. It is covered by a thick layer of crystalline schists and granite–gneiss; this layer is topped by sandstones and conglomerates which were formed by elevated Tertiary sediments. Traces of these sediments are found in the Northwest Rila at an elevation of up to 1,900 m. The highest zones are made mainly of granite, and below are crystalline schists, whose compound minerals are sequentially deposited. They are represented by gneiss, mica schists, and amphibolite. In many places granite passes into granite–gneiss. There are marbles and amphibolites formed in the Paleozoic over 250 million years ago and subsequently elevated during the Tertiary period. The coarse–grained granites are the dominant rocks forming almost two–thirds of the area of the Rila's higher parts.

Rila was subjected to glaciation during the Pliocene and the Pleistocene. Its modern Alpine relief was formed during the last Würm glaciation some 10–12 000 years ago, when the snowline of the mountain was 2,100–2,200 m. The glaciers reached elevations as low as 1,200 m. Above this boundary, the glaciers radically altered the existing relief, forming deep cirques, pyramidal peaks, steep cliffs, long U-shaped valleys, moraine fields and other glacial forms. On the slopes of some valleys such as those of the rivers Beli Iskar, Maritsa and Rilska there are hanging glacier valleys — tributary valleys located higher than the main ones. The bottom of cirques are often occupied by glacial lakes. As a result of the weathering, scree formations of varied nature have been accumulated. In the south-western foothills of Rila the Stob Earth Pyramids were formed under the influence of erosion.

The staged elevation of the mountain during the geological eras and the large range of vertical folds have led to the formation of four denudation levels of distinct age, height and range. The oldest Early Miocene level encompasses the highest sections of the mountain with an elevation between 2,800 and 2,400 m. It represents practically leveled terrain with gently folded surface, formed in the place of ancient forest massifs. The next Late Miocene level, the young Miocene, is situated on the main side ridges with an elevation between 2,600 and 2,300 m. The third level formed during the Early Pliocene has an elevation of 1,800 and 1,600 m. The Late Pliocene level occupies areas with an elevation of up to 1,300 m.

There are two summits above 2,900 m, Musala and Malka Musala. Some of the highest peaks are:

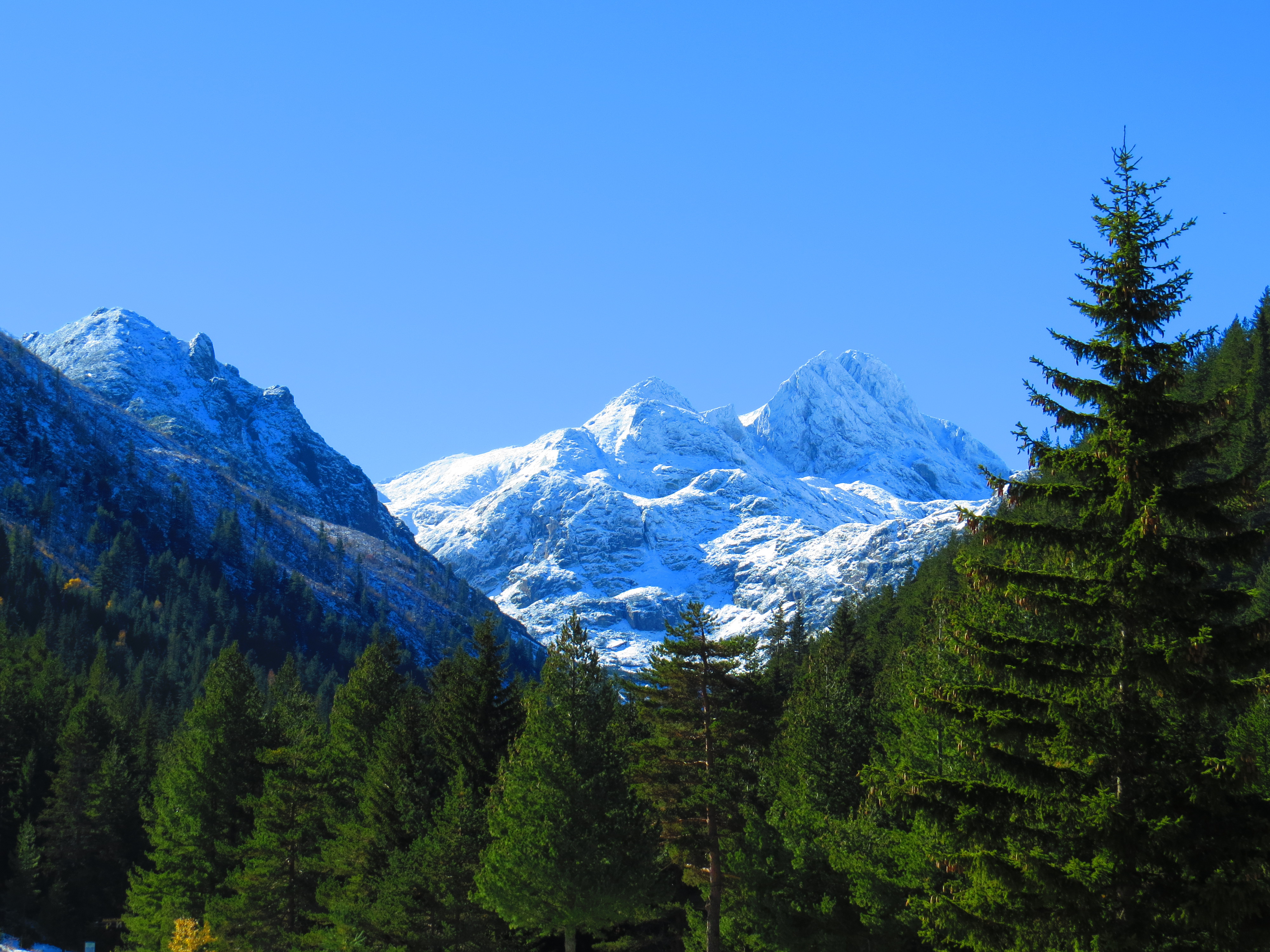
The summit of Malyovitsa

- Musala, 2,925 m (9,596 ft)
- Malka Musala, 2,902 m (9,521 ft)
- Irechek, 2,852 m (9,357 ft)
- Bezimennia Vrah, 2,792 m (9,160 ft)
- Deno, 2,790 m (9,154 ft)
- Studenia Chal, 2,785 m (9,137 ft)
- Golyam Bliznak, 2,779 m (9,117 ft)
- Malak Bliznak, 2,777 m (9,111 ft)
- Mancho, 2,771 m (9,091 ft)
- Pesokliva Vapa, 2,769 m (9,085 ft)
- Ovcharets (Yurushki Chal), 2,768 m (9,081 ft)
- Marishki Chal, 2,765 m (9,072 ft)
- Golyam Kupen, 2,731 m (8,960 ft)
- Malyovitsa, 2,729 m (8,953 ft)
- Sreden Kupen, 2,724 m (8,937 ft)
- Aleko, 2,713 m (8,901 ft)
- Rilets, 2,713 m (8,901 ft)
- Golyam Skakavets, 2,705 m (8,875 ft)
- Popova Kapa, 2,704 m (8,871 ft)
- Lopushki Vrah, 2,698 m (8,852 ft)
- Otovishki Vrah, 2,696 m (8,845 ft)
- Yosifitsa, 2,696 m (8,845 ft)
- Lovnitsa, 2,695 m (8,842 ft)
- Kanarata, 2,691 m (8,829 ft)
- Draganitsa, 2,690 m (8,825 ft)
- Orlovets, 2,685 m (8,809 ft)
- Vodni Chal, 2,683 m (8,802 ft)
- Malak Skakavets, 2,682 m (8,799 ft)
- Zlia Zab, 2,678 m (8,786 ft)
- Damga (Vazov Vrah), 2,669 m (8,757 ft)
- Golyam Kalin, 2,668 m (8,753 ft)
- Ibar, 2,666 m (8,747 ft)
- Dodov Vrah, 2,661 m (8,730 ft)
- Eleni Vrah, 2,654 m (8,707 ft)
- Angelov Vrah, 2,643 m (8,671 ft)
- Ostrets (Sivrichal), 2,641 m (8,665 ft)
- Ravni Chal, 2,637 m (8,652 ft)
- Kovach, 2,634 m (8,642 ft)
- Belmeken, 2,626 m (8,615 ft)
- Dvuglav, 2,605 m (8,547 ft)
- Mermera, 2,602 m (8,537 ft)
- Golyam Mermer, 2,602 m (8,537 ft)
- Haramiyata (Hayduta), 2,465 m (8,087 ft)

== Climate ==
Rila is situated in the southern zone of the humid continental climate region and has typical Alpine climate with elevational zones. The climate is influenced by the Icelandic and the West Mediterranean cyclones, the former mainly in late spring and early summer, and the latter — in winter, bringing frequent and high rainfall, as well as by the Azores and Siberian anticyclones in summer and winter, bringing droughts. The local microclimate is also influenced by the terrain, the exposure of the slopes and the orientation of the valleys. The average temperature decreases and the average precipitation increases with elevation. The coldest month is March and the hottest one August. Negative temperatures remain on average for about nine months in the Alpine zone, often continuing until the end of June. A steady rise in temperature is observed in the middle and end of July. Even during the summer months, temperature over 10 °C do not hold up for long periods. About five to ten days in June, July and August have an average temperature above 15 °C. This determines the short vegetation period in the high elevation areas which varies from three to six months; it lasts about three months at elevation over 2,000 m. The average annual temperature is 2.6 °C on the northern slopes and 3.1 °C on the southern. With an average annual temperature of −3.0 °C, Musala is the coldest place in Bulgaria. The lowest absolute temperature in Rila was also measured there: −31.2 °C; the lowest mean monthly temperature was recorded there in February: −11.6 °C. The absolute maximum temperature at Musala is 18.7 °C. Temperature amplitude decreases with elevation from 20 °C at 800 m to 15 °C at 2,800 m. Temperature inversions, i.e. increase in temperature with height, are frequent on the northern slopes and occur especially often in the Samokov Valley, Borovets and Musala, where it is observed in 250 days annually.

Climate data for Musala Peak
Month	Jan	Feb	Mar	Apr	May	Jun	Jul	Aug	Sep	Oct	Nov	Dec	Year
Record high °C (°F)	7 (45)	3.4 (38.1)	12.1 (53.8)	13.7 (56.7)	12.6 (54.7)	16.5 (61.7)	20.0 (68.0)	18.7 (65.7)	17 (63)	14 (57)	9.6 (49.3)	6.8 (44.2)	18.7 (65.7)
Mean daily maximum °C (°F)	−8.2 (17.2)	−7.6 (18.3)	−5.6 (21.9)	−1.6 (29.1)	2.5 (36.5)	7.0 (44.6)	10.0 (50.0)	10.2 (50.4)	6.1 (43.0)	1.8 (35.2)	−2.1 (28.2)	−6.1 (21.0)	0.5 (32.9)
Daily mean °C (°F)	−10.9 (12.4)	−10.8 (12.6)	−9.0 (15.8)	−5.2 (22.6)	−1.0 (30.2)	4.3 (39.7)	6.8 (44.2)	7.1 (44.8)	2.6 (36.7)	−1.0 (30.2)	−4.9 (23.2)	−8.6 (16.5)	−2.5 (27.5)
Mean daily minimum °C (°F)	−13.8 (7.2)	−13.6 (7.5)	−11.6 (11.1)	−7.8 (18.0)	−3.4 (25.9)	1.5 (34.7)	3.6 (38.5)	4.1 (39.4)	0.2 (32.4)	−3.6 (25.5)	−7.3 (18.9)	−11.0 (12.2)	−5.2 (22.6)
Record low °C (°F)	−30.6 (−23.1)	−29.8 (−21.6)	−26.8 (−16.2)	−20.6 (−5.1)	−15.6 (3.9)	−12 (10)	−8 (18)	−9.8 (14.4)	−14 (7)	−17.5 (0.5)	−27.4 (−17.3)	−31.2 (−24.2)	−31.2 (−24.2)
Average precipitation mm (inches)	126 (5.0)	110 (4.3)	130 (5.1)	128 (5.0)	119 (4.7)	105 (4.1)	80 (3.1)	56 (2.2)	47 (1.9)	72 (2.8)	88 (3.5)	115 (4.5)	1,176 (46.3)
Average rainy days	1	0	0	0	4	8	9	7	6	3	1	0	39
Average snowy days	13	14	17	18	14	5	2	1	4	8	13	15	124
Mean monthly sunshine hours	114	112	140	127	168	181	250	250	182	169	128	104	1,925
Source: Stringmeteo.com

The annual precipitation varies with elevation and slope orientation. The annual precipitation is 653 mm at Samokov (1,029 m), 932 mm at Borovets (1,350 m) and 1200 mm at Musala (2,925 m); about 80% of it being snow at the later. The rainfall occurs mostly in summer and spring on the northern slopes, with maximum in June and minimum in February; the rainfall increases in winter and decreases in summer on the southern slopes and yet the monthly maximum and minimum are the same; there are 130–160 days with rainfall/snowfall. Air humidity in the highlands of Rila ranges between 80 and 85%. The coldest winter months are also the driest. Humidity differs on the northern and southern slopes of Rila. The snow cover above 1,000 m begins to form on 10–15 December on the northern slopes and after 20–30 December on the southern. Its average monthly thickness reaches 20 to 30 cm in February at low elevations. In the Alpine zone above 2,000 m the snow cover is thickest in March, reaching 70 to 80 cm. In the highest ridges the maximum thickness reaches 200 to 240 cm. The snow cover remains for an average of 70–80 days at elevations of 1,200–1,300 m and 180 to 200 days at elevations above 2,000 m. Avalanches are frequent, often caused by temperature changes by the influx of warm Mediterranean air masses.

Winds may reach speed of 40–45 m/s (over 100 km/h) at the summits, with mostly south-western and western orientation. The north-west and north-east winds are more moderate. The average monthly wind speed on the highest mountain summits reaches 11–12 m/s. In the lower parts, the average monthly speed varies from 1.2 to 2.5 m/s and in the middle height zone it ranges from 2.5 to 3.2 m/s. Winds are usually strongest in winter and lightest in autumn. The annual duration of sunshine in the Alpine zone is 1930 hours with maximum in August and minimum in December–January; it raises to more than 2150 hours at 1,000 m.

== Hydrology ==
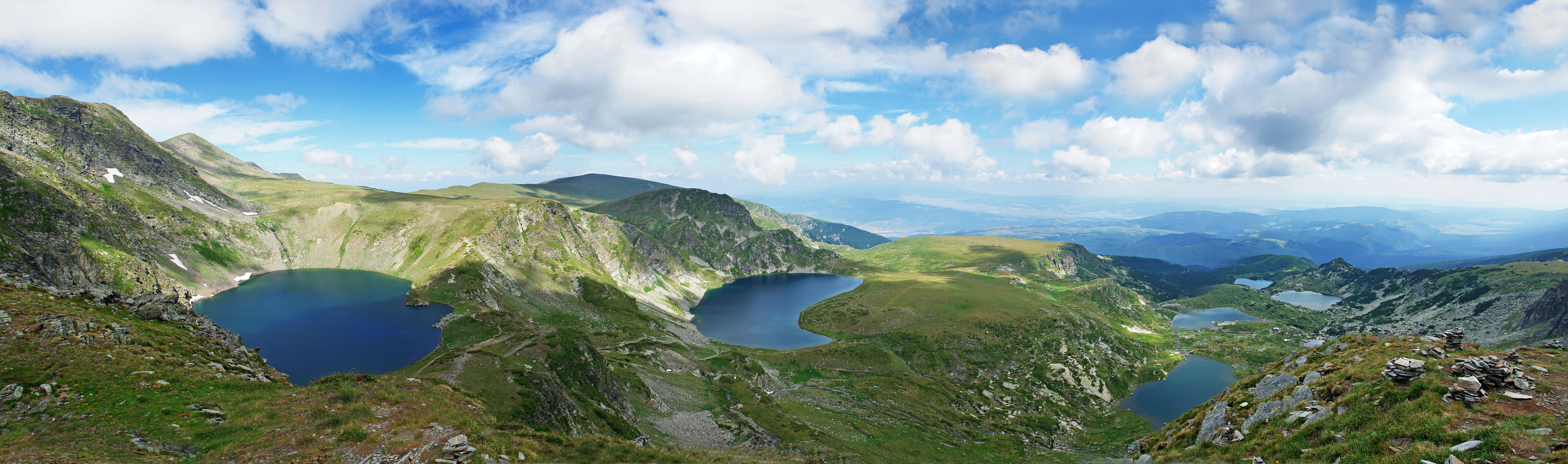
The Seven Rila Lakes

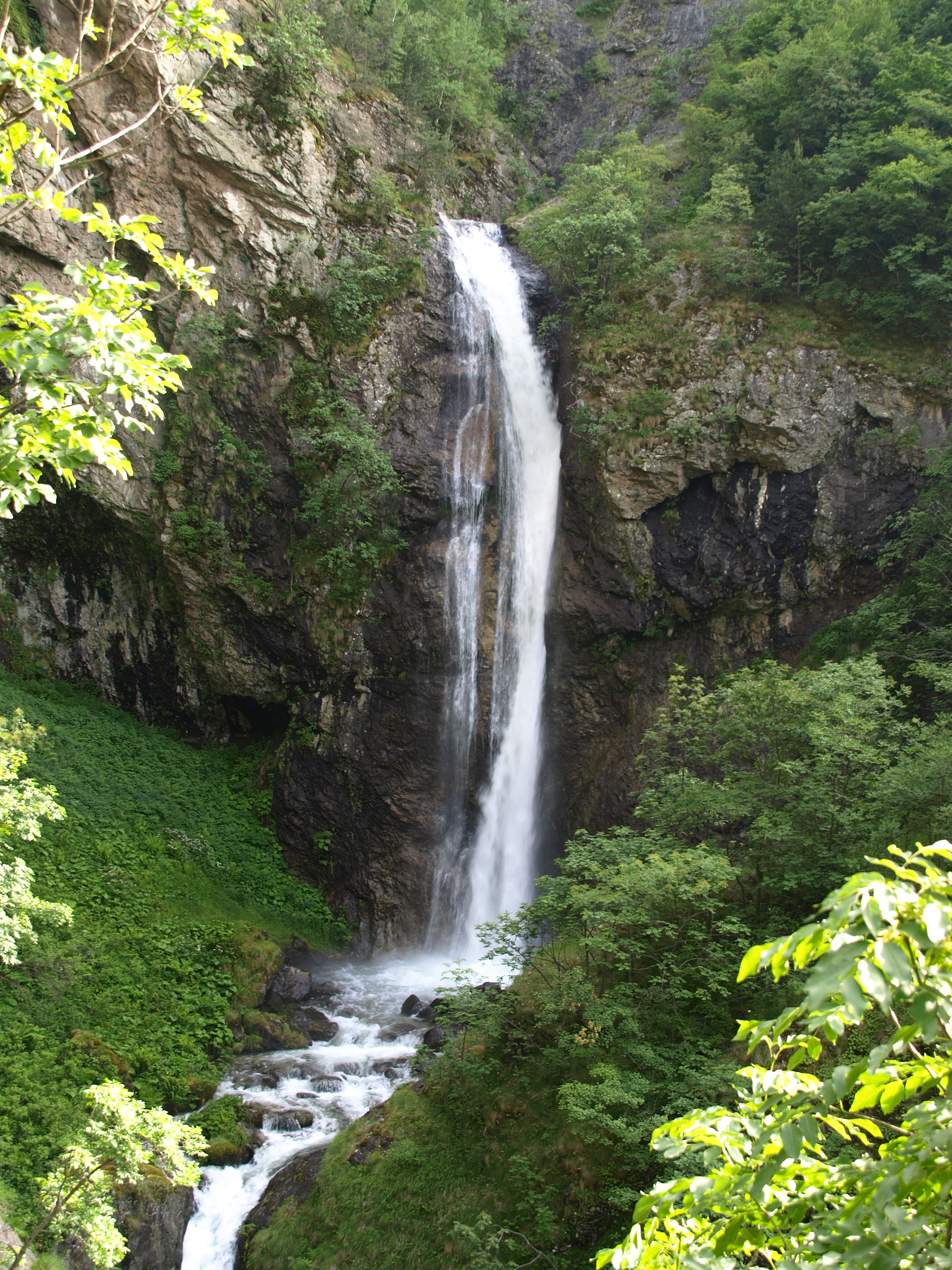
Goritsa Waterfall

Rila is an important hydrological unit in Bulgaria with very high hydropower potential, representing about 1/4 of the total potential of the country. The water reserves that form within the mountain range are the most important source of clean potable water for the surrounding settlements, the national capital Sofia and part of the population of Northern Greece and European Turkey. The regime of the rivers of Rila is directly related to the elevation and about half of the water reserves in the mountain are at an elevation above 2,050 m. The main drainage divide in the Balkans separating the drainage basins of the Black Sea and the Aegean Sea passes through Rila's northern ridge, including the summit of Musala. Some of the Balkans' longest rivers originate from Rila, including the Maritsa, Iskar and Mesta, as well as several important tributaries of the Struma — Rilska, Dzherman and Blagoevgradska Bistritsa. Of them, the Iskar and its tributaries belong to the Black Sea drainage basins, and all the rest — to the Aegean. About 78% of the water flows into the Aegean drainage system. The runoff comes from snowmelt in the Alpine zones and rainfall. Water discharge reaches its maximum in late spring and early summer with spring accounting for more than half of the total annual discharge. The maximum at the highest elevations is in summer due to the late snowmelt. The minimum is in autumn and winter. The largest waterfalls are Skakavitsa (70 m) and Goritsa (39 m). There are abundant mineral springs that include the hottest one in South-eastern Europe at Sapareva Banya forming a geyser with a temperature of 101.4 °C.

The cirques at the high elevation zone contain 189 glacial lakes; there are also about 30 smaller ones that evaporate in summer, including tectonic lakes like Panichishte. Their location is closely linked to the snowline during the last glacial period and most of them lie at elevations between 2,100 m and 2,500 m. Most lakes (28) are situated at elevations between 2,300 m and 2,350 m; there are 23 between 2,350 m and 2,400 m, 19 between 2,250 m and 2,300 m and 19 between 2,400 m and 2,450 m. Their length varies between 800 m and 20 m, the width — between 375 m and 10 m, the area — between 1 m and 212 decares, the depth — between 0.5 m and 37.5 m. Most of them are between 2 m and 10 m deep and four reach depth of over 20 m. The water is transparent as deep as 15 m. Most of the lakes are covered with ice during most of the year — from October to June. The ice thickness reaches 3 m in the highest lakes. The largest glacial lake in Rila and in the Balkans is Smradlivo with an area of 212 decares; the longest is the Upper Ribno Lake reaching 801 m; the deepest is Okoto, one of the Seven Rila Lakes with a depth of 37.5 m; the highest is Ledeno at an elevation of 2,709 m; the lowest is Suho at 2,045 m. The most important lake groups are the Seven Rila Lakes (seven lakes), Musala Lakes (seven), Marichini Lakes (seven), Urdini Lakes (six), Malyovishki Lakes (three), Elenski Lakes (three), Chanakgyolski Lakes (two), Vapski Lakes (two), etc.

== Nature ==
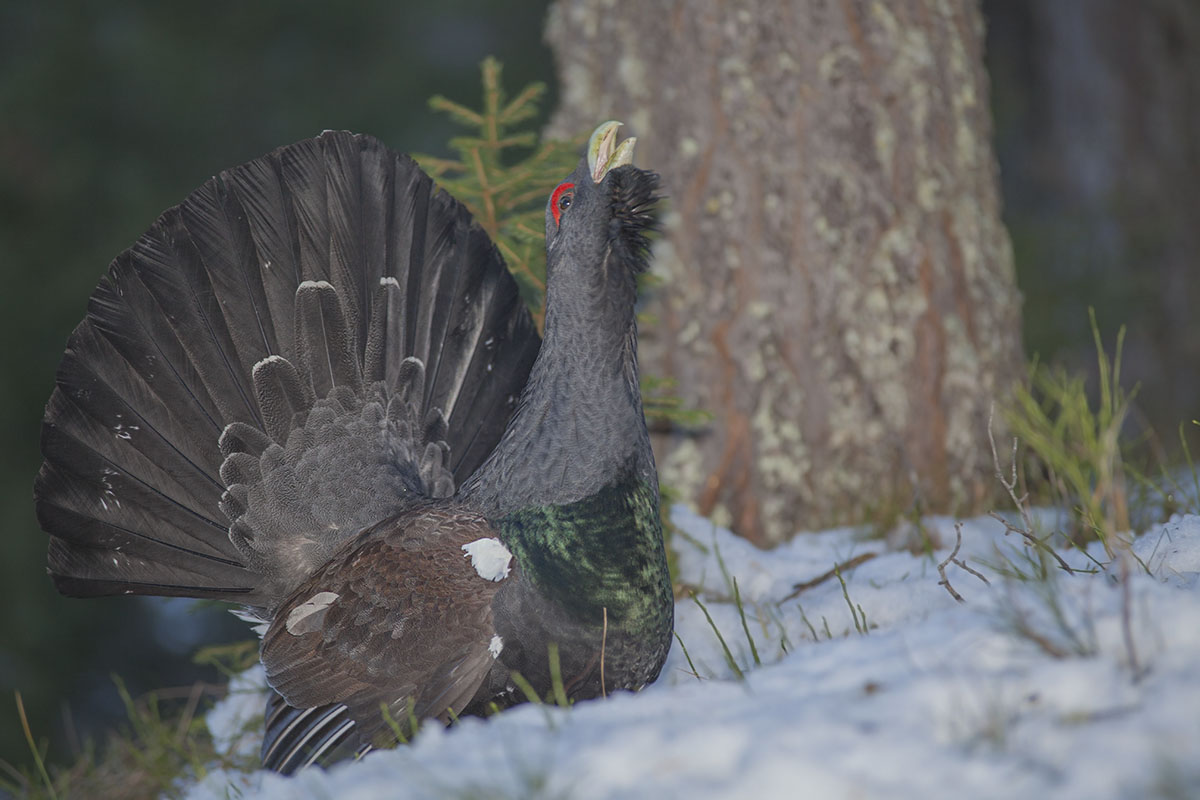
A male western capercaillie in Rila

The vegetation is determined by the elevation. At the lowest portions there are xerothermal oak forests dominated by Hungarian oak (Quercus frainetto), pubescent oak (Quercus pubescens) and Austrian oak (Quercus cerris) with some Mediterranean cenosis of cade juniper (Juniperus oxycedrus) and scorpion senna (Hippocrepis emerus). Higher in the mountain up to 1,300 m the deciduous forests are primarily of sessile oak (Quercus petraea) with smaller participation of European hop-hornbeam (Ostrya carpinifolia), common hornbean (Carpinus betulus), Heldreich's maple (Acer heldreichii), Balkan maple (Acer hyrcanum) and European ash (Fraxinus excelsior); the zone between 1,300 m and 1,600 m is dominated by European beech (Fagus sylvatica), at places mixed with European silver fir (Abies alba). The endemic Rila oak (Quercus protoroburoides) inhabits only the Rilska River valley. The forests of coniferous zone between 1,600 m and 2,100 m consist of primarily of Norway spruce (Picea abies), Macedonian pine (Pinus peuce) и Scots pine (Pinus sylvestris). The sub-Alpine zone up to 2,500 m is covered by dwarf mountain pine (Pinus mugo) and common juniper (Juniperus communis) formations mixed with green alder (Alnus viridis) at wetter localities and Rhododendron myrtifolium in East Rila. The alpine line is covered with grass, moss, lichen, rare flowers, dwarf willows such as Salix herbacea, Salix retusa and Salix reticulata, etc. Due to the difficult terrain, the forests of Rila are not much influenced by anthropogenic activities and their average age is above 100 years. Some Norway spruces and European silver firs reach height of 60 m.

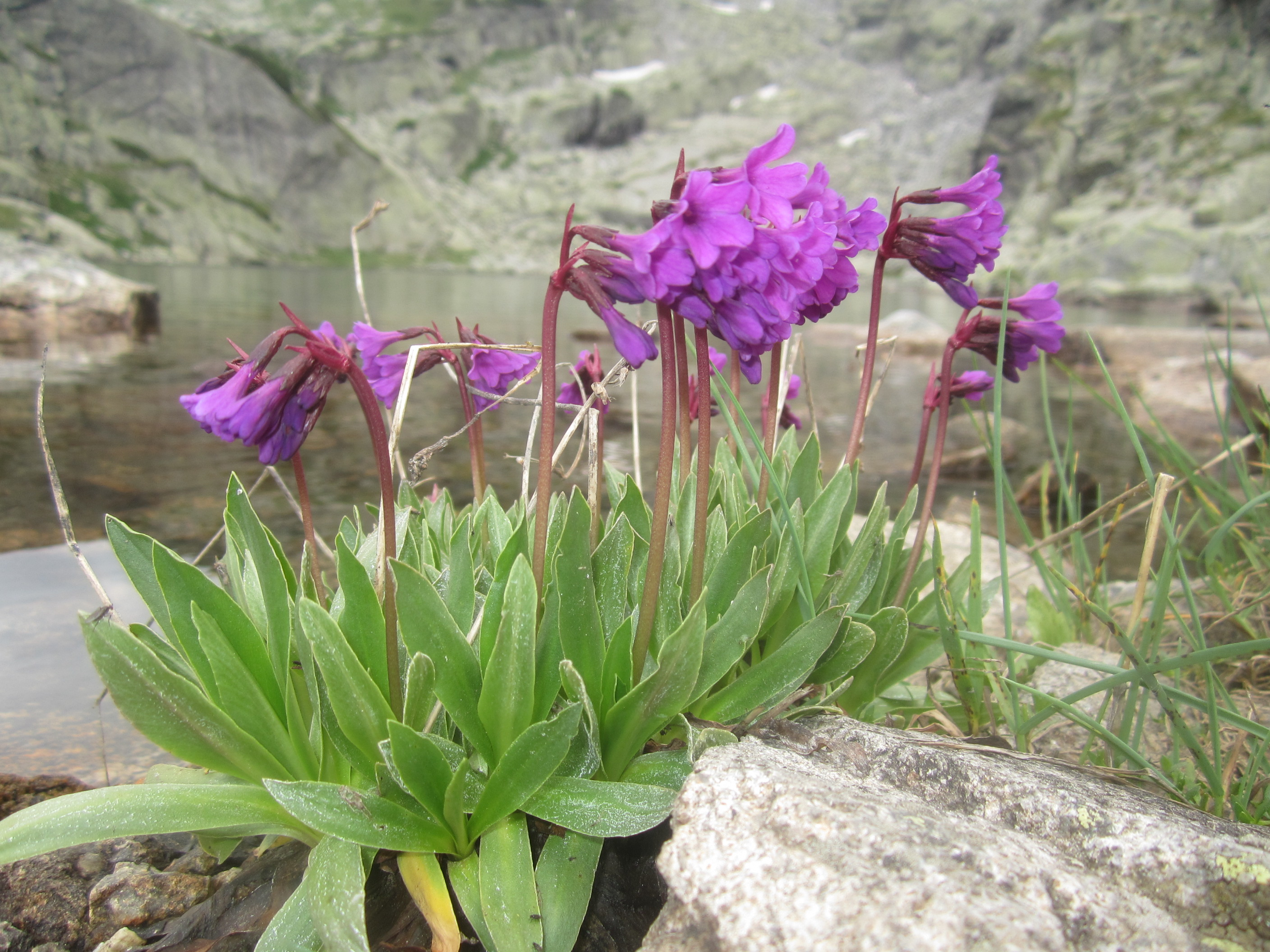
The endemic Rila primrose (Primula deorum)

The number of vascular plants includes about 1400 species registered only within the territory of Rila National Park, of them 34 are endemic to Bulgaria, including three restricted to Rila, and 89 — to the Balkans; 31 are Tertiary or pre-glacial relicts and 104 are glacial relicts. Notable Bulgarian endemic species include Rila primrose (Primula deorum) and rhapontic rhubarb (Rheum rhaponticum); taxa restricted to the Balkans include Bulgarian avens (Geum bulgaricum), yellow columbine (Aquilegia aurea), Bulgarian gentian (Gentianella bulgarica), Balkanian butterwort (Pinguicula balcanica), Crocus veluchensis, Dianthus microlepis, etc. The non-vascular flora includes 974 algae, 313 moss and 251 lichen species. The fungi are represented by 665 species, including 64 mushrooms listed in the Red Book of Bulgaria.

The mammal species within Rila National Park and its surroundings are 62 and include taxa of high conservation value, such as brown bear, gray wolf, wildcat, least weasel, European pine marten, marbled polecat, wild boar, red deer, roe deer, chamois, European ground squirrel, as well as the glacial relict European snow vole. The bird species are 156; of the 120 are nesting within Rila National Park. These include three relicts — boreal owl, Eurasian pygmy owl and Eurasian three-toed woodpecker, and species that require special conservation measures like short-toed snake eagle, golden eagle, peregrine falcon, black stork, Eurasian woodcock, western capercaillie, hazel grouse, rock partridge, grey-headed woodpecker, black woodpecker, white-throated dipper, wallcreeper and Alpine chough among others. There are 18 reptile, 10 amphibian and 12 fish species. The invertebrate fauna discovered so far includes 4186 species and is expected to rise to over 7000; of them 34 are endemic to Rila, 123 — to Bulgaria and another 123 — to the Balkans.

The biodiversity, ecosystems and the pristine landscapes are protected by Rila National Park declared in 1992, which is Bulgaria's largest spanning a territory of 810.46 km^{2}, and Rila Monastery Nature Park covering another 252.535 km^{2}. There are four nature reserves in the former — Parangalitsa, Central Rila Reserve, Ibar and Skakavitsa, and another one, Rila Monastery Forest, in the latter. Parangalitsa was declared a UNESCO Biosphere Reserve in 1977, while the Central Rila Reserve is the largest one in the Balkans with an area of 123.937 km^{2}.

== Settlements, transportation and economy ==
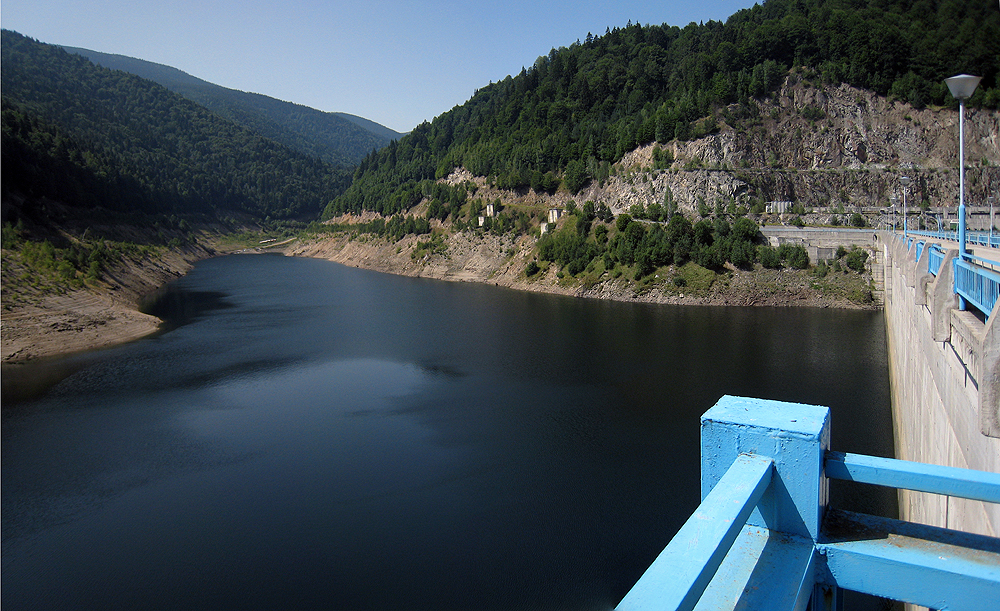
The dam of Chaira HPP

Rila is a sparsely populated mountain range with most of the settlements located in the valleys at the foothills, inhabited by c. 250,000 people. Administratively it falls in four of Bulgaria's 28 provinces: Blagoevgrad, Kyustendil, Sofia and Pazardzhik. From west to east there are five towns at the northern foothills — Sapareva Banya (pop. 3,815 as of 2016), Samokov (25,880), Dolna Banya (4,510), Kostenets (6,228) and Belovo (3,533); there are four towns at the western foothills (from north to south) — Dupnitsa (35,255), Rila (2,359), Kocherinovo (1,723) and Blagoevgrad (66,886); as well as three more at the south-eastern foothills (from west to east) — Razlog (12,036), Belitsa (2,964) and Yakoruda (5,288). There are a number of villages, including among others Govedartsi, Belchin, Madzhare, Kostenets, Pastra, Stob, Barakovo, Dobarsko, etc. Some of the settlements on the Rila include a small Aromanian minority.

The mountain range is served by several roads running along its foothills. No roads traverse the massif. In the west along the Struma Valley runs Struma motorway paralleled by the first class I-1 road, both part of European route E79, that connect the national capital Sofia and Greece via the provincial centre Blagoevgrad. The second class II-62 road branches off I-1 at Dupnitsa and runs east to Samokov where it joins the second class II-82 road which continues in eastern direction until the town of Kostenets, where it joins the first class I-8 road, part of European route E80. The second class II-19 road which branches off I-1 at Simitli, goes east crossing the Predel Saddle into the Razlog Valley and at the homonymous town links with the second class II-84 road which runs in north-eastern direction along the Avramovo Saddle and links with the I-8 road/E80 near Pazardzhik. Rila is served by the Bulgarian State Railways via railway line No. 1 in the north-east with stations at Kostenets and Belovo, railway line No. 5 along the Struma Valley in the west and the Septemvri–Dobrinishte narrow-gauge line in the south-east.

The most important sectors of the local economy are tourism, services, industry and agriculture. The abundant water resources are utilised by some of Bulgaria's largest hydro power plants, the most important of them being fueled by the Belmeken Dam in East Rila — Chaira Pumped Storage Hydro Power Plant (864 MW), Belmeken Pumped Storage Hydro Power Plant (375 MW), Sestrimo Hydro Power Plant (240 MW) and Momina Klisura Hydroelectric Power Station (120 MW). Chaira is the largest pumped storage HPP in South-eastern Europe. They form the Belmeken–Sestrimo–Chaira Hydropower Cascade, the biggest and most complex hydroelectric complex in Bulgaria, with a combined installed capacity of 1,599 MW. At an elevation of 1,900 m is located the second biggest reservoir in Rila, Beli Iskar, constructed between 1939 and 1945, that provides 25% of Sofia's potable water and powers a small 16 MW hydro power station. At an elevation of 2,394 m, Kalin is the highest reservoir in the Balkans. Rila accounts for 6% of Bulgaria's timber resources. Manufacturing industry is centred in Blagoevgrad, Dupnitsa, Samokov, Razlog and Belovo; the main sectors are food processing, machine building, pharmaceutical and paper mills.

== Tourism ==
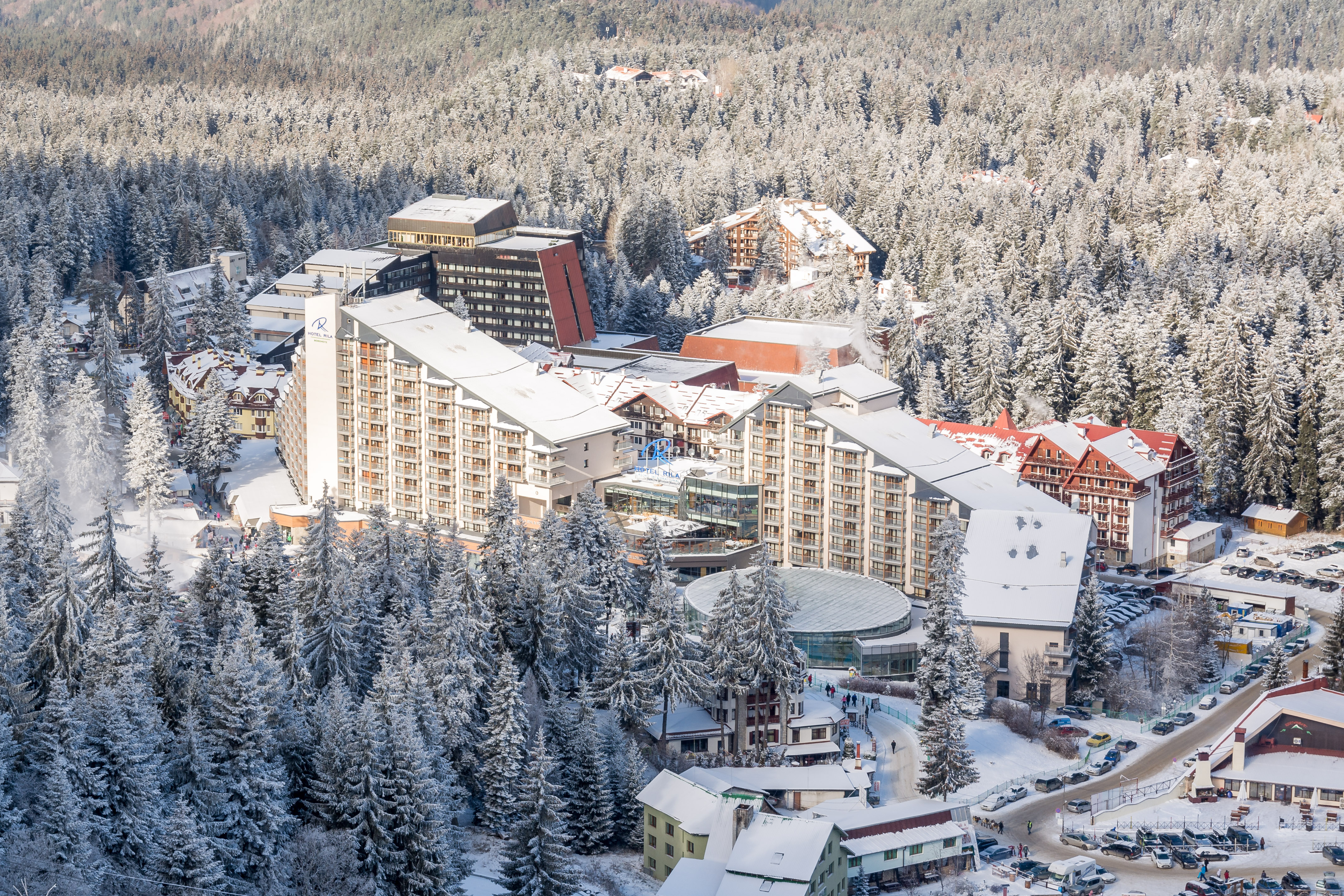
A view of Borovets in winter

Rila is a popular tourist destination for winter sports, spa tourism, recreation and cultural tourism. Borovets, situated on the northern slopes at 9 km from Samokov, is the oldest winter resort in Bulgaria and the largest one in Rila. It has 27 marked ski runs with a total length of 58 km equipped with 12 lifts facilities and provides conditions for alpine skiing, cross-country skiing, night skiing, biathlon, snowboard, etc.; it has hosted competitions in the FIS Alpine Ski World Cup and the Biathlon World Championships 1993. The top elevation is 2,560 m while the lowest is 1,300 m. Over 36,000 foreign tourists have stayed in Borovets for the 2016/17 winter season spending an average of five nights. Other much smaller ski resorts include Panichishte with several ski runs, Semkovo with seven ski runs totaling 4 km, Bodrost with 5 km ski runs and Govedartsi with a single 1.7 km ski run. The Balmeken High Mountain Sports Complex is located at an elevation of 2,050 m in East Rila and is used for training, medical and biological research by athletes but also provides opportunities for family recreation.

The mountain range was a favourite place of retreat for the Bulgarian monarchs Ferdinand I (r. 1887–1918) and his son Boris III (r. 1918–1943). The palace of Tsarska Bistritsa was constructed between 1898 and 1914 above Borovets in the traditional Bulgarian National Revival style with several edifices and a park. Its 170 kW hydroelectric generator installed in 1912 is still working unaltered. Two other hunting lodges were constructed for the monarchs — Sitnyakovo and Saragyol. There are 17 mountains refuges with a total of 1938 beds. There are 198 km primary and 363 km secondary hiking trails in Rila National Park, including E4 European long distance path that traverses it from west to south and E8 European long distance path that traverses it from north-west to south. Rila National Park was visited by about 100,000 tourists annually for the period 2000–2014 reaching a peak of 268,000 in 2012, while with a little more than 1 million visitors Rila Monastery Nature Park is the second most visited one in the country, after Vitosha. In 2000 on the south-western slopes was established the Dancing Bears Park Belitsa that shelters all dancing bears from Bulgaria following the ban of that practice, as well as individuals from Albania and Serbia.

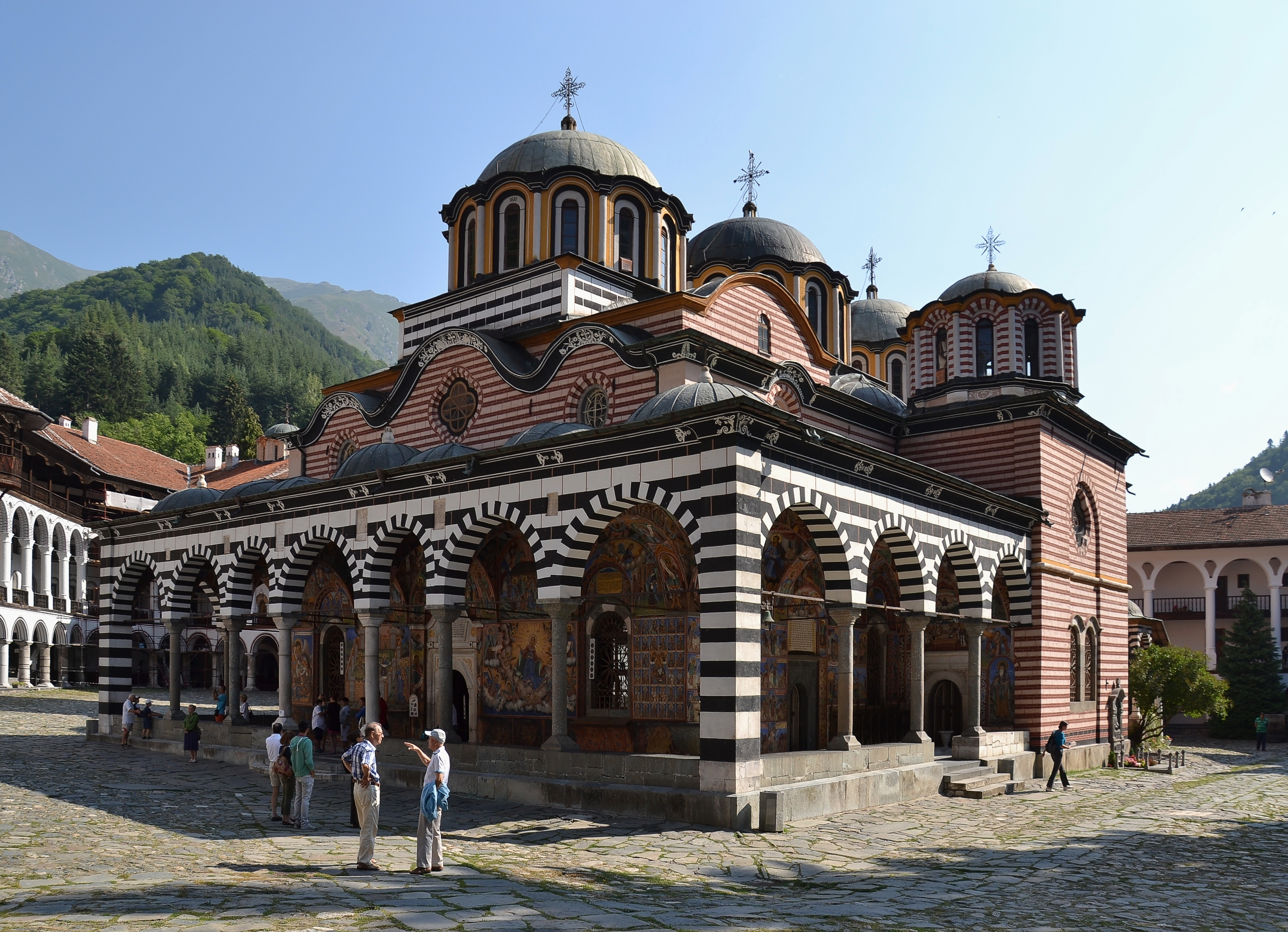
The main church of the Rila Monastery

The abundant mineral springs along the fault lines along the northern foothills of Rila favour health and spa tourism. The most significant spa resorts from west to east are Sapareva Banya with a total discharge of 33 L/sec and temperature of 33–101.4 °C, Belchinski Bani with a total discharge of 24 L/sec and temperature of 40–41.5 °C, Dolna Banya with a total discharge of 22 L/sec and temperature of 56.3 °C and the village of Kostenets with a total discharge of 12 L/sec and temperature of 46–73 °C.

Rila has well developed cultural tourism and contains five of the 100 Tourist Sites of Bulgaria — the Church of Theodore Tyro and Theodore Stratelates in the village of Dobarsko, the Rila Monastery and the Stob Earth Pyramids, the Seven Rila Lakes, the museum of history and the convent in the town of Samokov, and the summit of Musala. Rila Monastery is the most important architectural monument in the mountain range. It is situated at an elevation of 1,147 m and was declared a UNESCO's world heritage site in 1983. The Monastery is considered to be a cultural and spiritual centre of Bulgaria. With its architecture and frescos Rila Monastery represents a masterpiece of the creative genius of the Bulgarian people and has exerted considerable influence on architecture and aesthetics within the Balkan area. Established in the First Bulgarian Empire by the medieval Bulgarian hermit and saint John of Rila during the reign of emperor Peter I of Bulgaria (r. 927–969), the monastery developed into one of the main cradles of Bulgarian culture, literature and spirituality. In the 18th century it became one of the main hubs of the Bulgarian National Revival. The complex covers an area of 8,800 m^{2} and consists of a five-domed church, a defensive tower and monastic apartments encircling an inner yard. The exterior of the complex resembles a fortress with its high stone walls and little windows. The oldest surviving structure is the 23 m high Hrelyo's Tower, constructed in 1334–1335.

The Church of Theodore Tyro and Theodore Stratelates in Dobarsko at an elevation of about 1,000 m is a small three-naved stone basilica half dug into the ground, constructed in 1614 and painted in 1672. The church is noted for its abundance of original frescoes and icons. The Church of Saint Nicholas in Sapareva Banya is small medieval edifice, constructed anytime from the 11th to the 14th century. It was built using red bricks and white mortar and is of a simple cross-in-square design, with a single nave and apse. The town of Samokov achieved economic prosperity during the 17–19 centuries due to production of iron and has a number of monuments, including churches, a convent, a 17th-century Ottoman drinking fountain and a museum of history. Near Belchin is located the recently restored Tsari Mali Grad Fortress.

== Honour ==
Rila Point on Livingston Island in the South Shetland Islands, Antarctica is named after Rila Mountain.

== Gallery ==
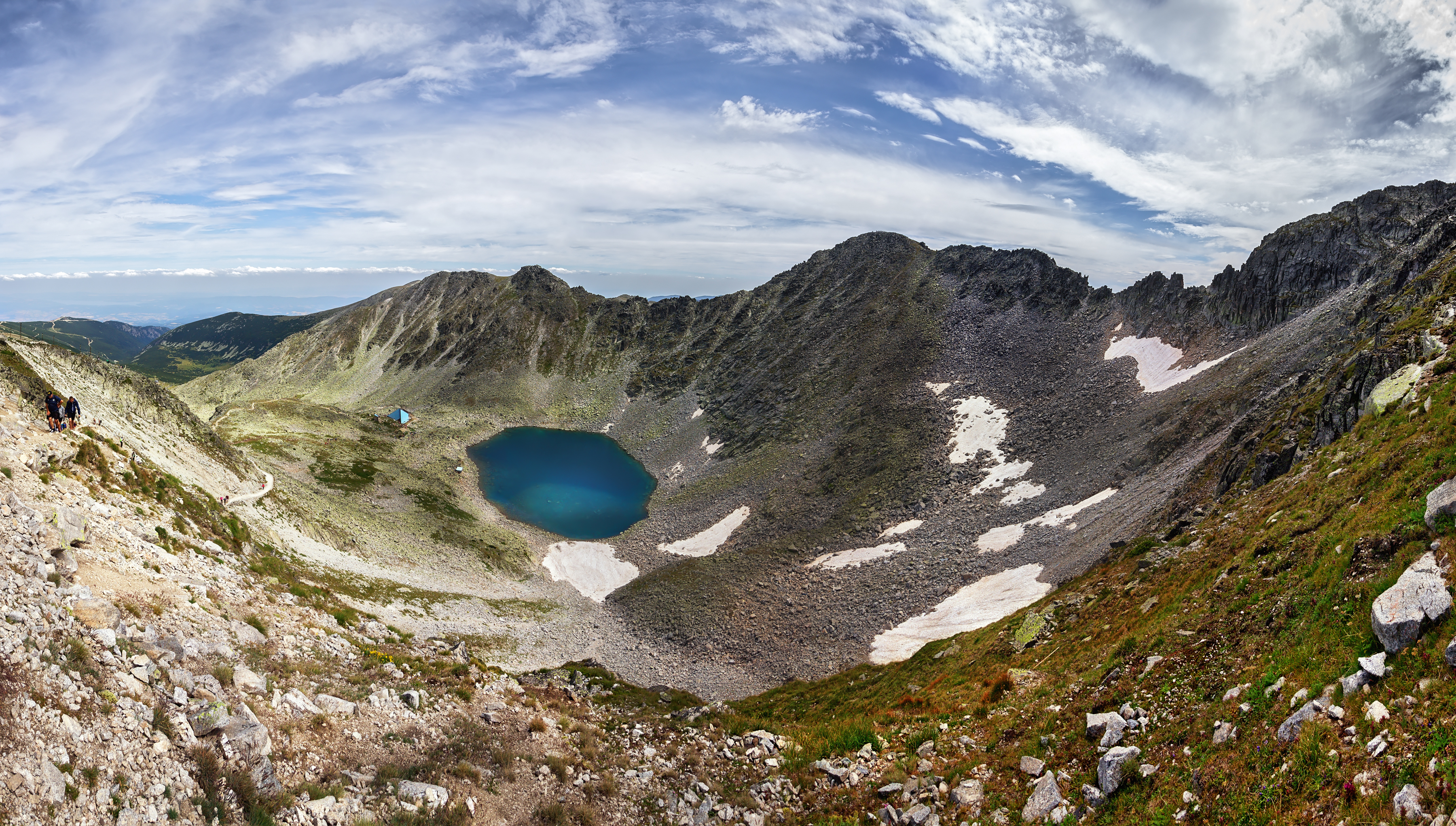
One of the Musala Lakes

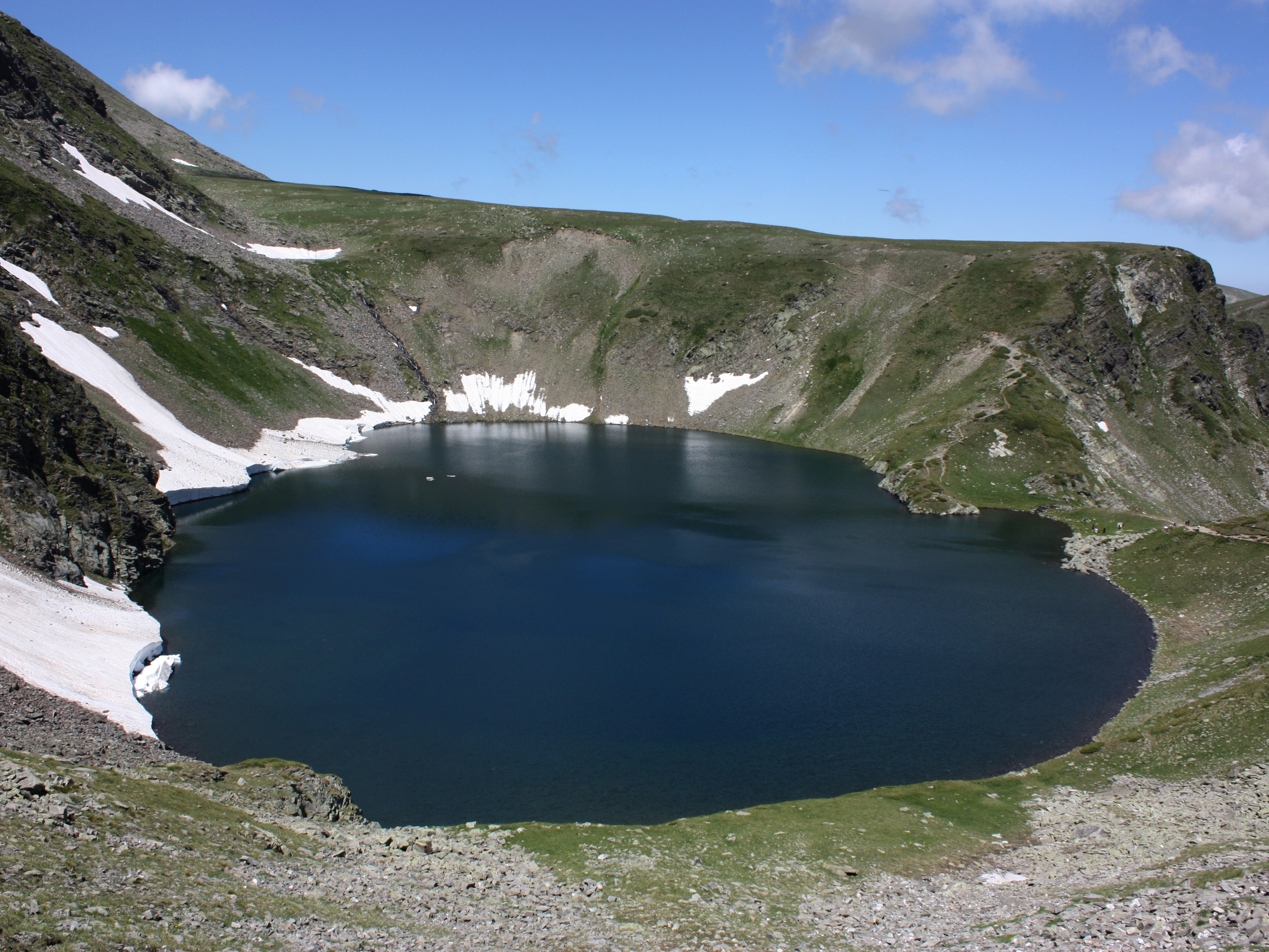
Okoto, Rila's deepest lake

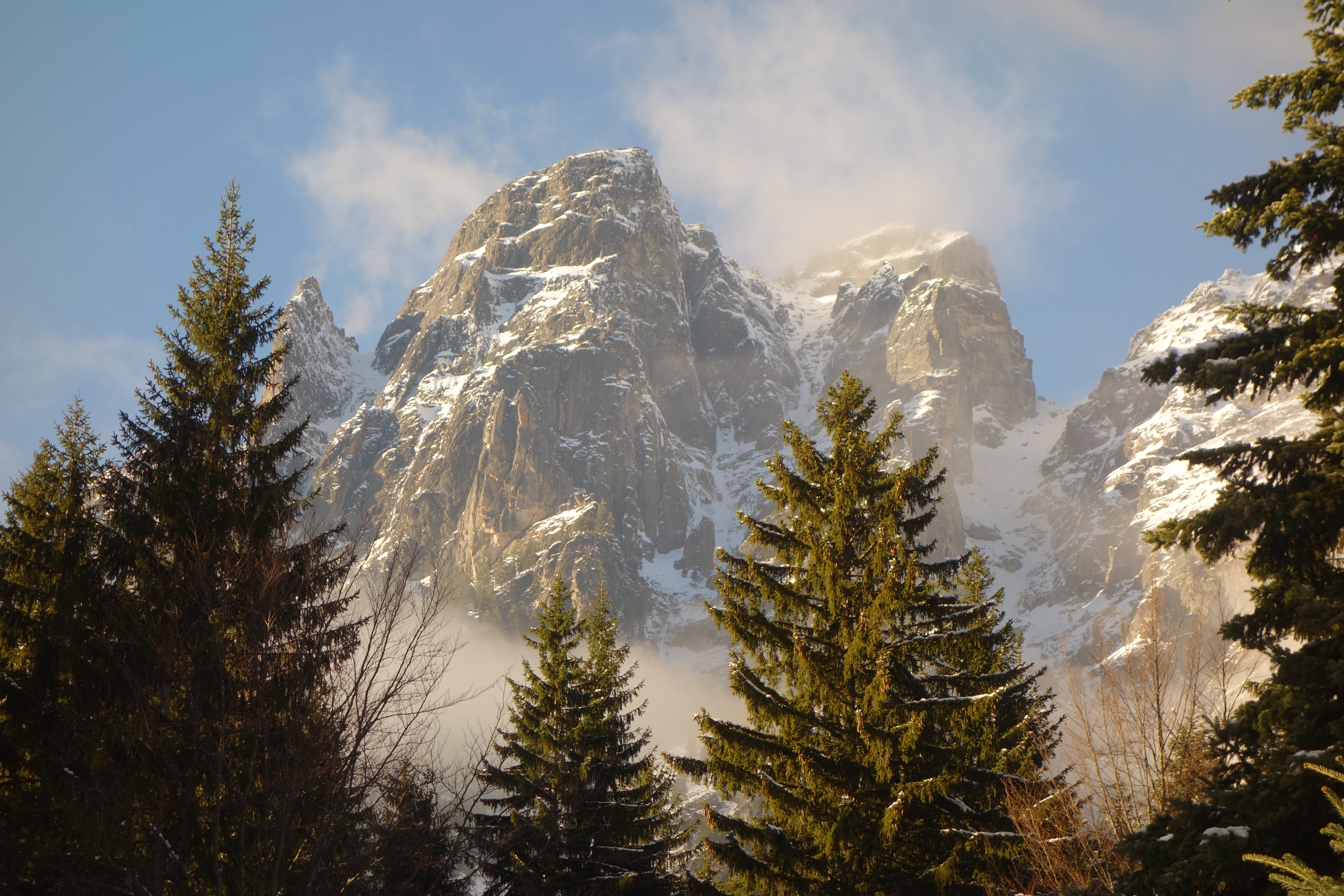
A view of Rila

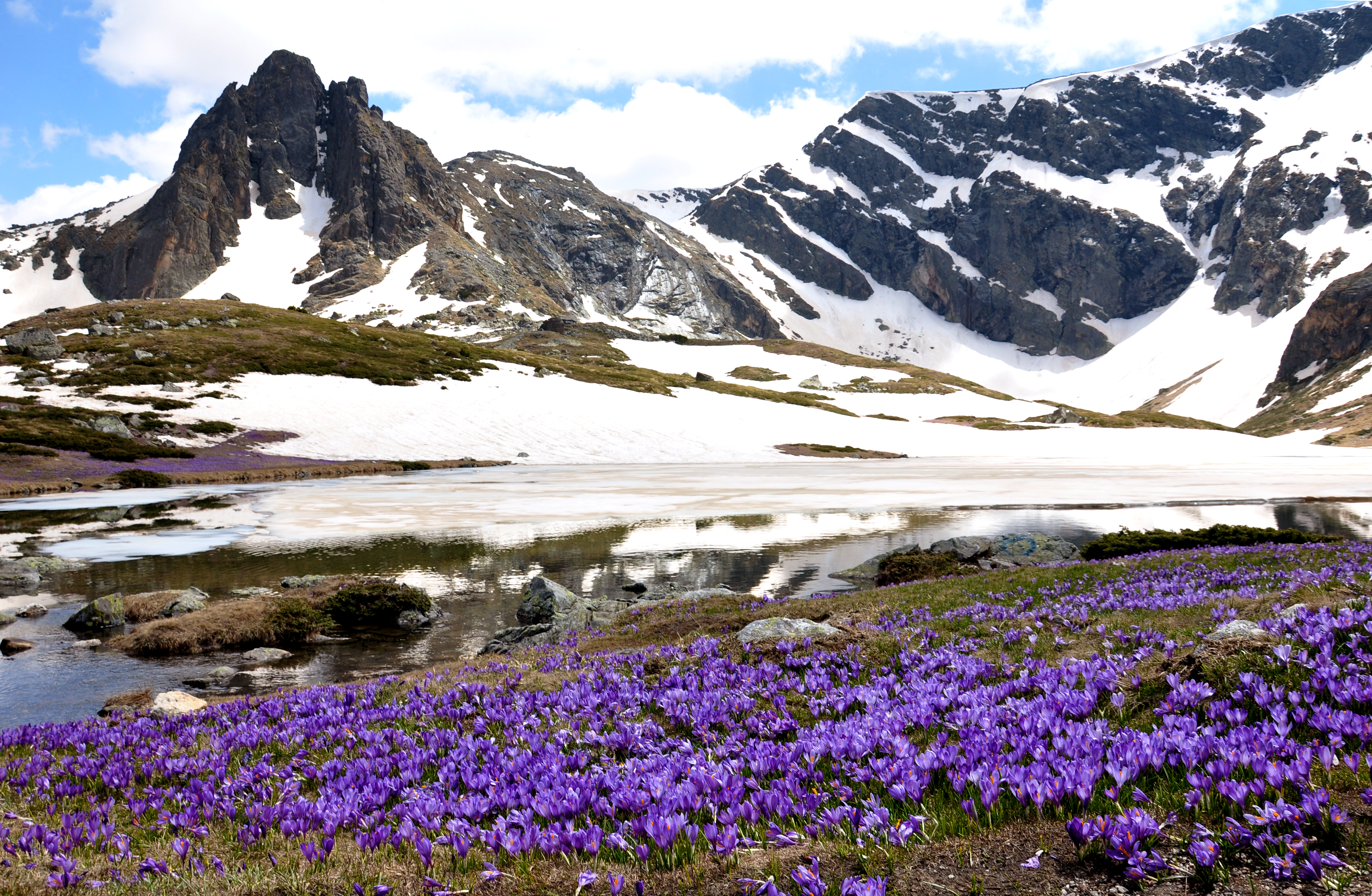
Crocuses next to the Seven Rila Lakes

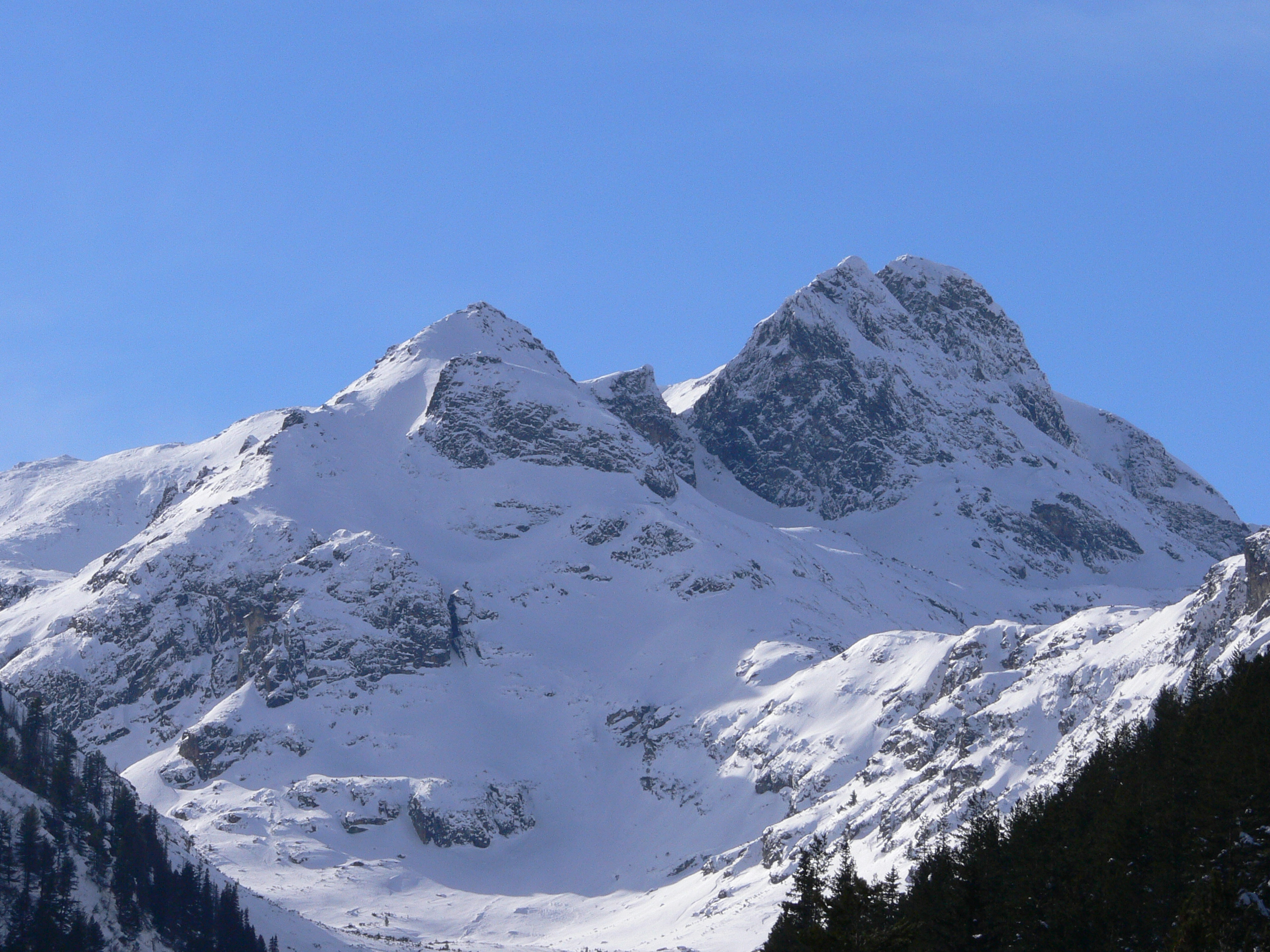
Malyovitsa seen in winter

== See also ==
- Geography of Bulgaria
- Rila National Park
- Rila Monastery Nature Park
- List of mountains in Bulgaria
- List of mountains of the Balkans
- List of protected areas of Bulgaria
- List of World Heritage Sites in Bulgaria
- List of ecoregions in Bulgaria
- Pirin
- Rhodope Mountains

== Sources ==
=== References ===
- Головински (Golovinski), Евгени (Evgeni) (2003). Българска енциклопедия "А-Я" [Bulgarian Encyclopaedia "A-Ya"] (in Bulgarian). и колектив. София (Sofia): Издателство "Труд" (Trud Press). ISBN 954-528-313-0.
- Георгиев (Georgiev), Владимир (Vladimir) (1986). Енциклопедия България. Том V. П-Р [Encyclopaedia Bulgaria. Volume V. P-R] (in Bulgarian). и колектив. София (Sofia): Издателство на БАН (Bulgarian Academy of Sciences Press).
- Мичев (Michev), Николай (Nikolay); Михайлов (Mihaylov), Цветко (Tsvetko); Вапцаров (Vaptsarov), Иван (Ivan); Кираджиев (Kiradzhiev), Светлин (Svetlin) (1980). Географски речник на България [Geographic Dictionary of Bulgaria] (in Bulgarian). София (Sofia): Наука и култура (Nauka i kultura).
- Дончев (Donchev), Дончо (Doncho); Каракашев (Karakashev), Христо (Hristo) (2004). Теми по физическа и социално-икономическа география на България (Topics on Physical and Social-Economic Geography of Bulgaria) (in Bulgarian). София (Sofia): Ciela. ISBN 954-649-717-7.
- Колектив (Collective) (2015). Rila National Park Management Plan, 2015–2024 (План за управление на национален парк "Рила", 2015–2024) (in Bulgarian). София (Sofia).
- Perry, Julian (2010). Walking in Bulgaria's National Parks. Cicerone. ISBN 978-1-85284-574-2.
- Набатов (Nabatov), Никита (Nikita) (2011). Електроенергетиката на България (Energy in Bulgaria) (in Bulgarian). София (Sofia): Гея Либрис (Tangra TanNakRa). ISBN 978-954-378-081-5.

=== External links ===
- "Rila National Park". Official Site of Rila National Park.
- "Rila National Park". Official Tourism Portal of Bulgaria. Archived from the original on 28 March 2020.
- "Visiting Rila".
