= Kupenite =

Kupenite (Купените)
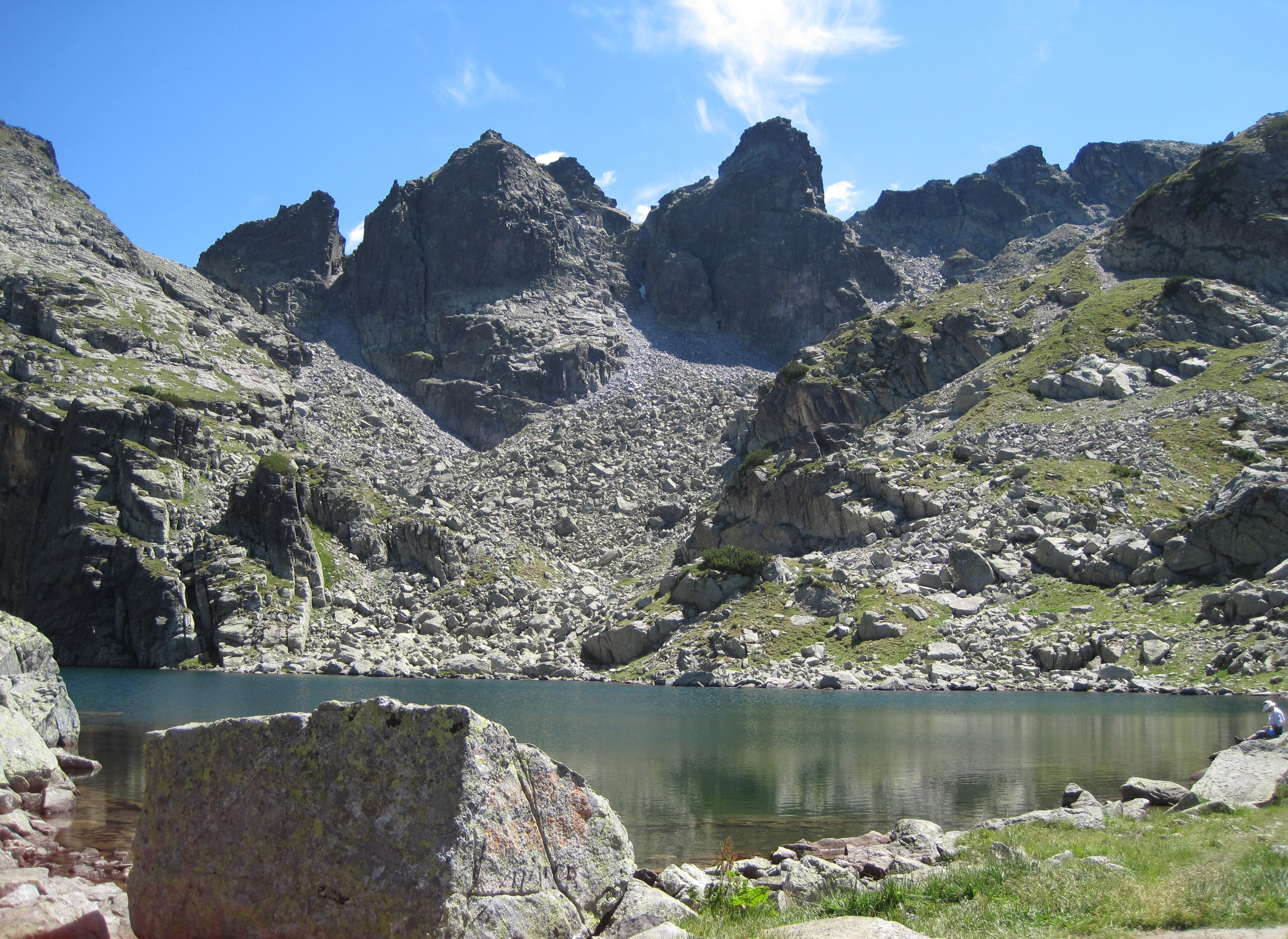
- Kupenite seen from the Dreadful lake

Highest point
- Elevation: 2,731 m (8,960 ft)

Geography
- Location: Bulgaria
- Parent range: Rila Mountains

Kupenite (Bulgarian: Купените) are a group of four summits in the northwestern part of the Rila Mountain in southwestern Bulgaria, situated on the Malyovitsa ridge between the peaks of Popova kapa and Lovnitsa. They are separated by steep couloirs and scree stones on the northern slopes. Kupenite rise over the glacial Dreadful Lake.

The easternmost summit is the lowest and is called Bezimenen — the Nameless One. Next to it raises the more massive Small Kupen (2,661 m), followed by the Middle Kupen (2,724 m) and the Big Kupen (2,731 m), which is the westernmost one. Although the Big Kupen is the highest peak in Northwestern Rila, that mountain section and its main ridge are called Malyovishki — after the symbol of Bulgarian mountaineering, the summit of Malyovitsa peak (2,729 m). The three easternmost summits are clearly visible from the Dreadful Lake and are sometimes referred to as the Trident. The view to the Big Kupen is somewhat obstructed by the short ridge that descends to the lake and therefore the Middle Kupen is often confused with the higher summit.

The walls on the northern slopes of Kupenite are favourable for rock climbing and mountaineering. The 90 m northern wall of Malak Kupen, built up by granite and biotite schists, is vertical in its middle section and slightly sloping at the top and bottom. There are several climbing routes on the northwestern walls of Middle Kupen, whose surface is characterized by smooth slabs, small ceilings and narrow cracks; the first 80 m have a reverse slopes.
