= Mermera =

Bulgarian mountain peak

Mermera (Мермера)
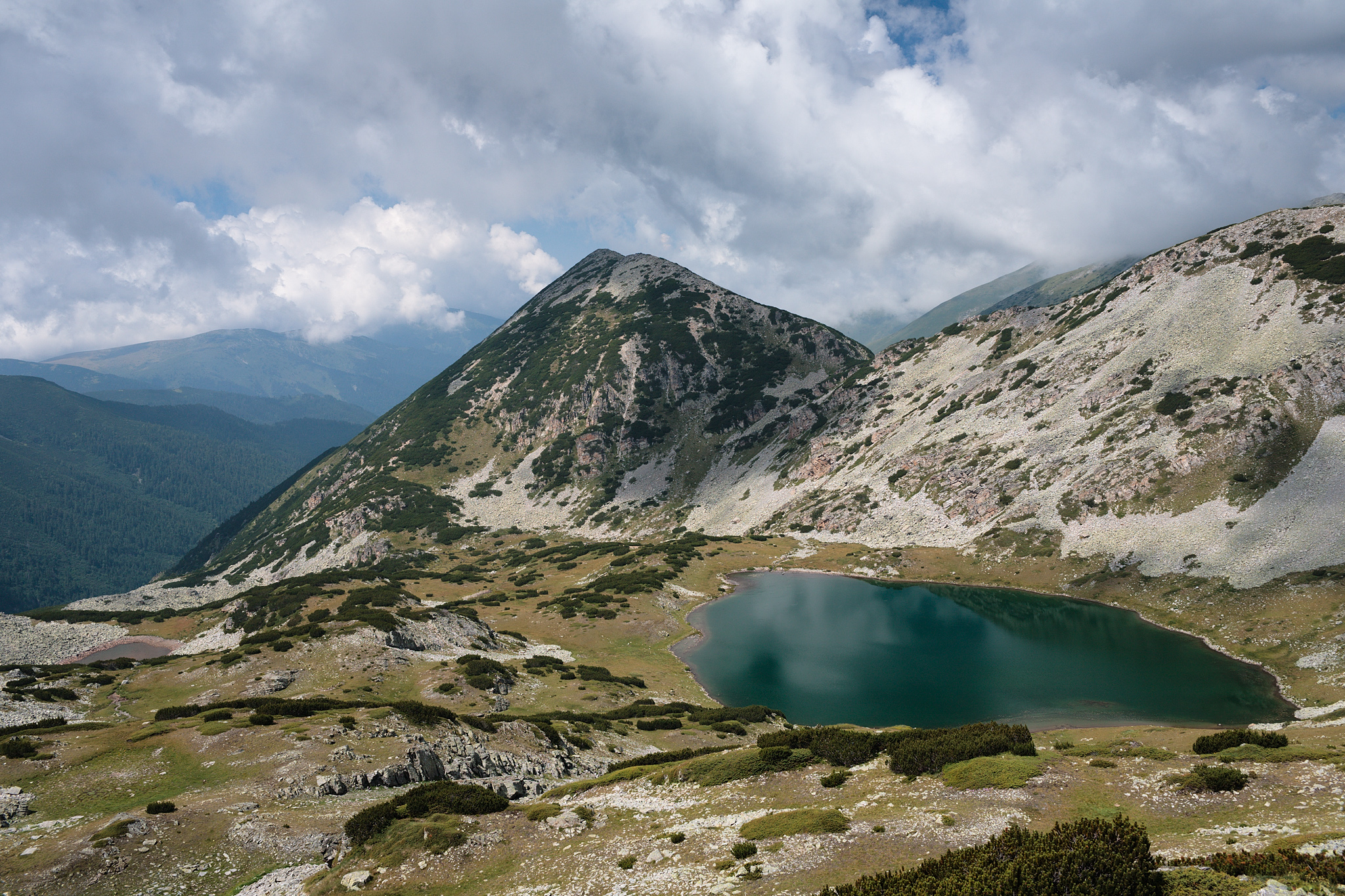

Highest point
- Elevation: 2,602 m (8,537 ft)
- Coordinates: 42°5′56″N 23°28′2″E

Geography
- Location: Bulgaria
- Parent range: Rila Mountains

Mermera (Bulgarian: Мермера, meaning "the marble"), also known as Mramorets (Мраморец) is a summit in central Rila mountain range in southwestern Bulgaria reaching height of 2,602 m. It is located in Rila Monastery Nature Park.

The summit is located on the Mermera ridge that branches off the main Rilets ridge, which served as a watershed of the headwater streams of the river Iliyna, the main tributaries of the Rilska River. The ridge bisects the Mermera cirque in two sections, northern and southern. In the northern one is situated the Mermera Lake, while the southern part hosts the four Karaomerichki Lakes, the most famous of which is the uppermost Blue Lake. At the beginning of the ridge is a small peak called Malak (Small) Mermer (2,586 m), separated from Mermera through a deep saddle.

Mermera has a pyramidal shape, its massif stands out impressively from its surroundings. The white marble from which the summit derives its name is mottled with dwarf mountain pine (Pinus mugo) grows, which become impassable further down its slopes.

The most common ascent routes to Mermera come from the Mermerski Preslap saddle on the Mermera ridge. In summer, it can be climbed from the Blue Lake or the Mermera Lake, from the deep saddle east of the summit. Mermera is about an hour and a half from the Ribni Ezera refuge, as well as from the summit of Kanarata (2,691 m). It is about 7 hours climb from the Rila Monastery via the Iliyna river valley.
