= Goritsa Waterfall =

- Горица
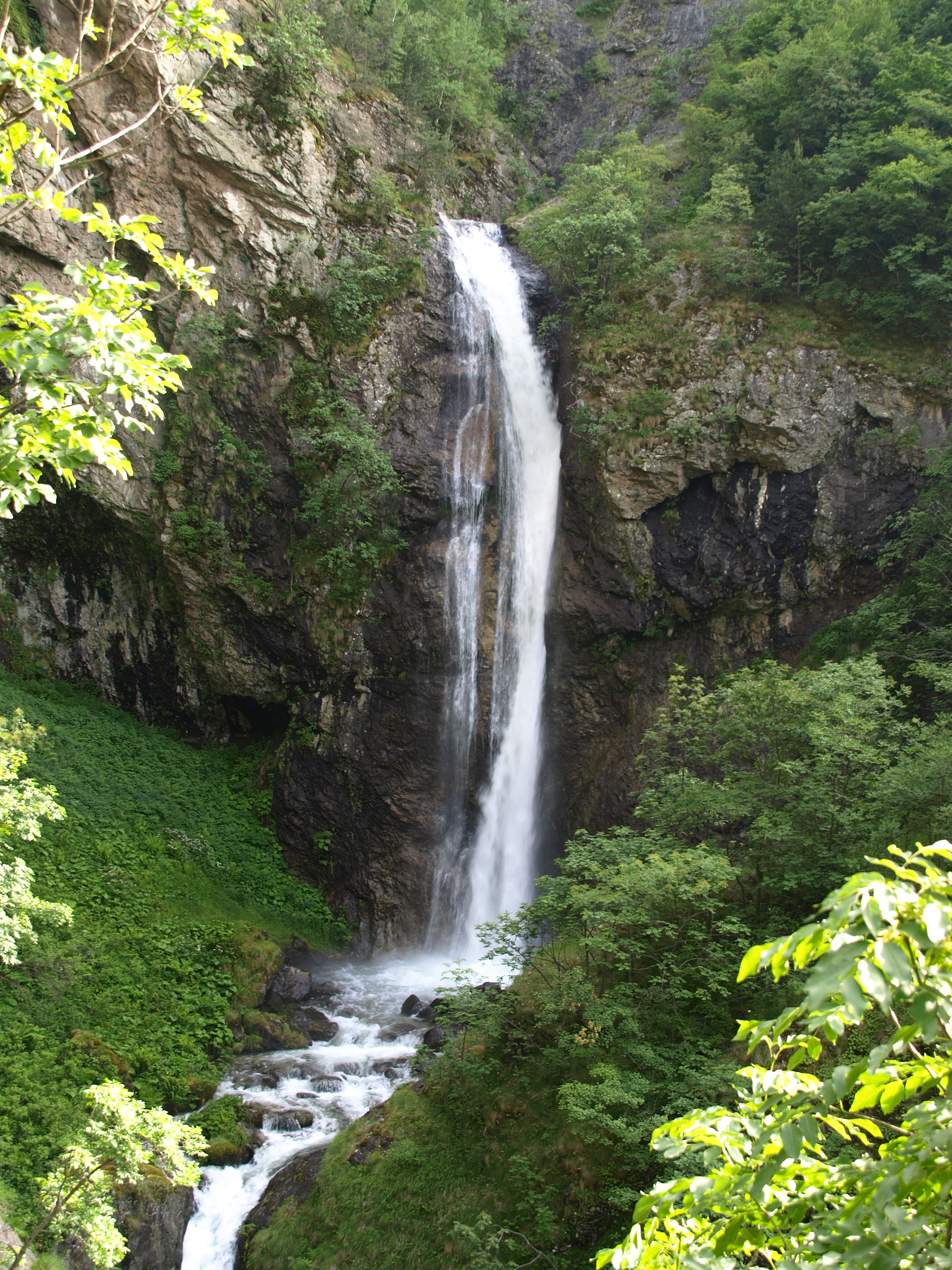
- Interactive map of Goritsa Waterfall
- Location: Rila Mountains, Bulgaria
- Coordinates: 42°16′3.44″N 23°13′43.6″E
- Type: Plunge
- Total height: 39 m (128 ft)

Goritsa (Bulgarian: Горица), also known as Ovcharenski Vodopad (Овчаренски водопад) is a 39 m high waterfall in the Rila mountain range of southwestern Bulgaria. It was declared a nature landmark by Order No. 3796 of the Ministry of Forestry on 11 October 1965.

== Description ==
Goritsa is situated in the northern foothills of Rila, near the village of Ovchartsi and the spa town of Sapareva Banya in Kyustendil Province. It is the lowest waterfall in Rila in terms of altitude – at 900 m above sea level. The waterfall is located along the course of the Goritsa river, a tributary of the Dzherman in the Struma basin. It is watered from the slopes of the summits of Kriva Sospa, Kamenna Mandra and Kabul. Goritsa is the second highest waterfall in Rila after Skakavitsa (70 m).

Goritsa is a plunge waterfall and is accessible via trail, starting from the upper outskirts of Ovchartsi in the direction of Sokolov Izgledl locality at an altitude of 1200 m. In addition to the main waterfall, there are six smaller waterfalls with a height of 5-15 m further upstream of the river. The waterfall is watered all year round, without the weather affecting the water flow.

== Gallery ==
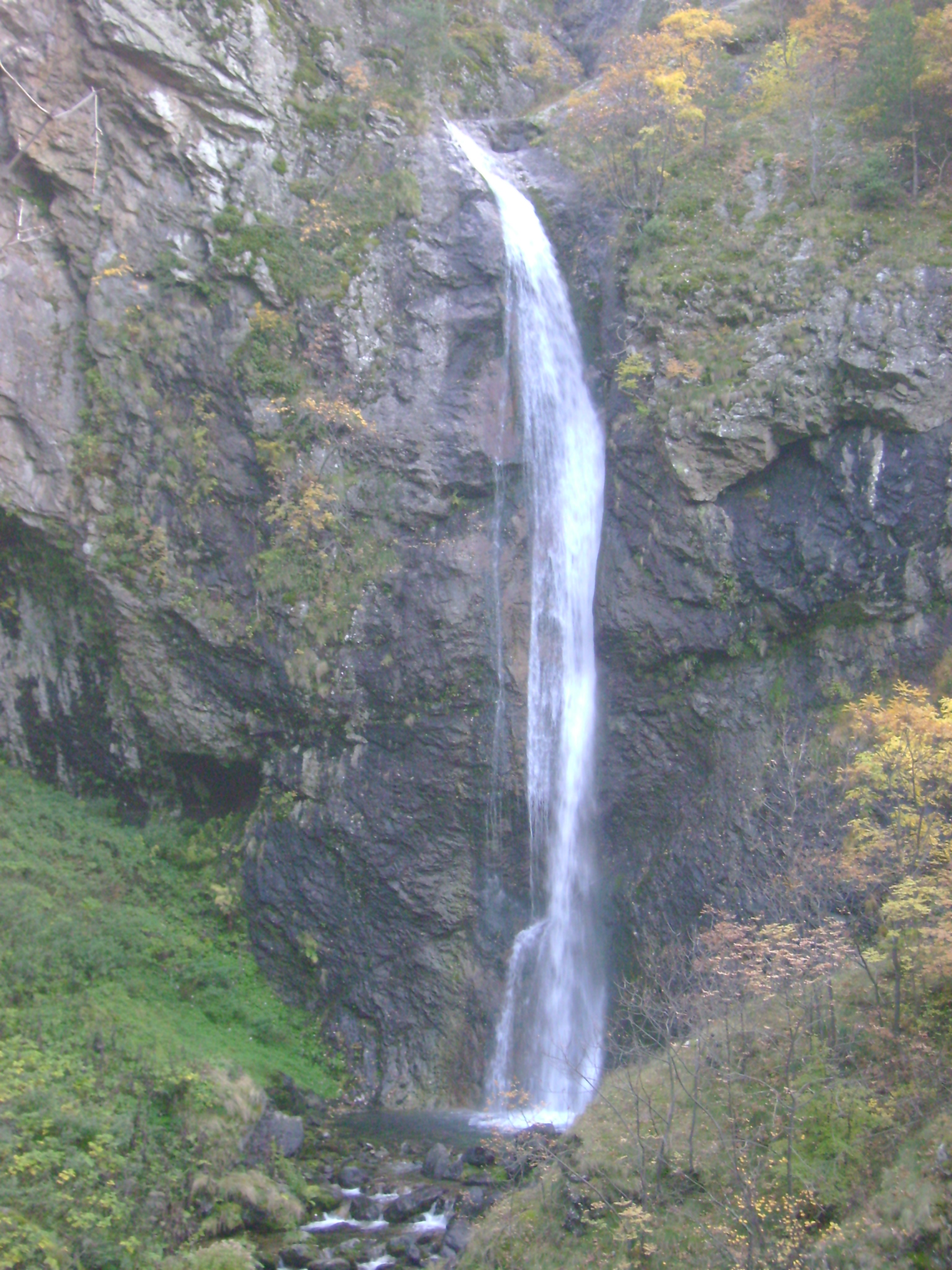

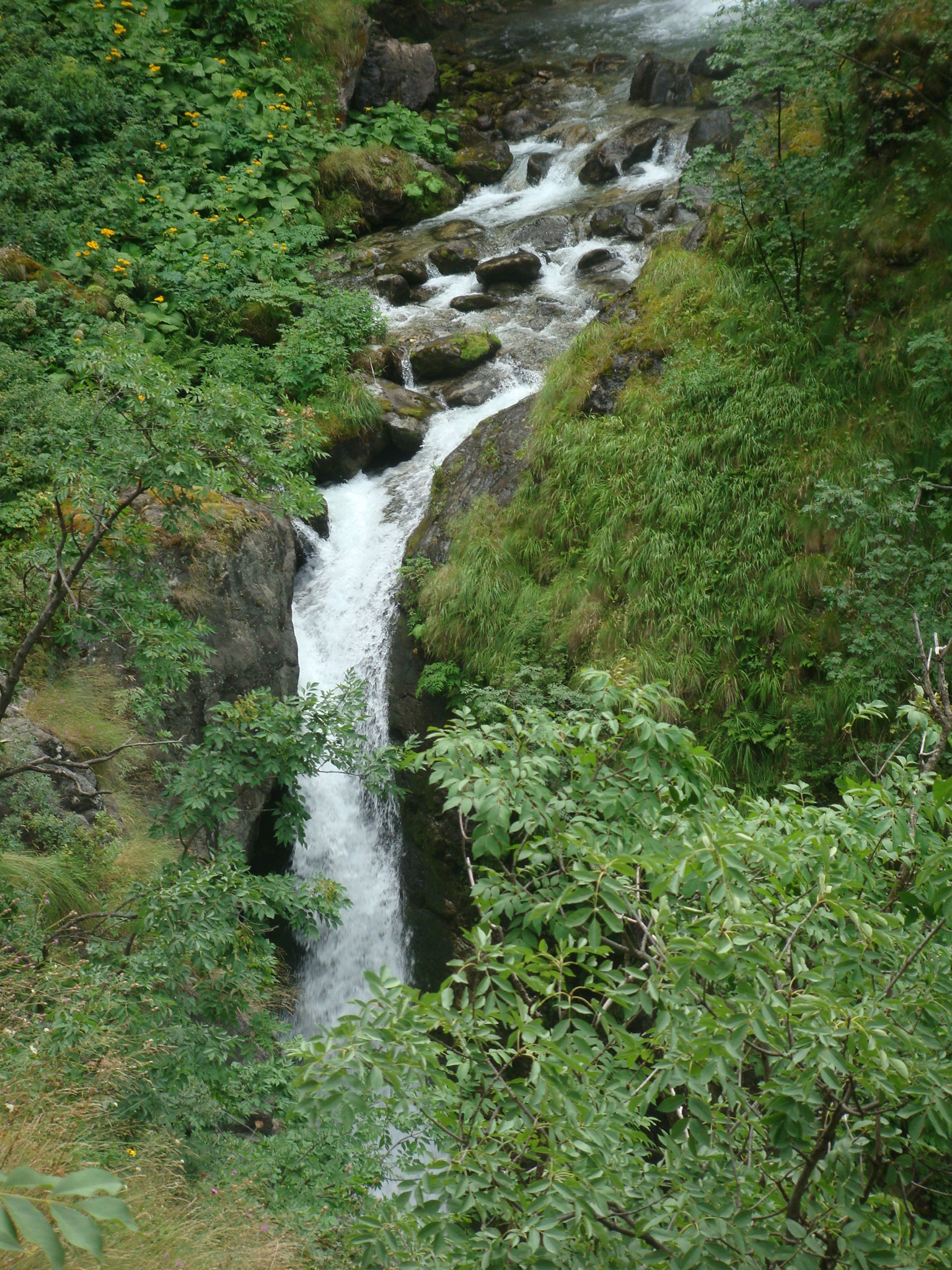

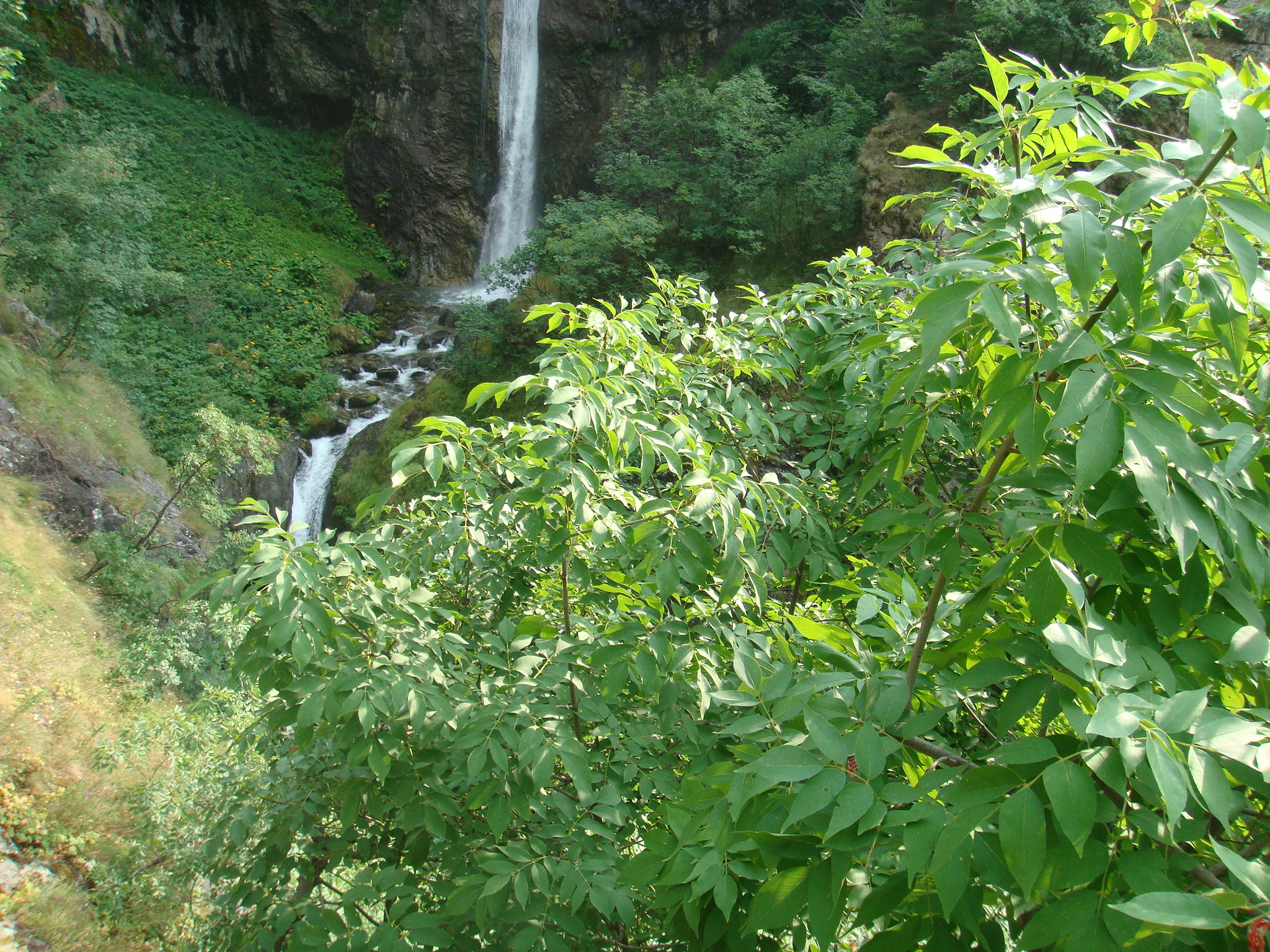

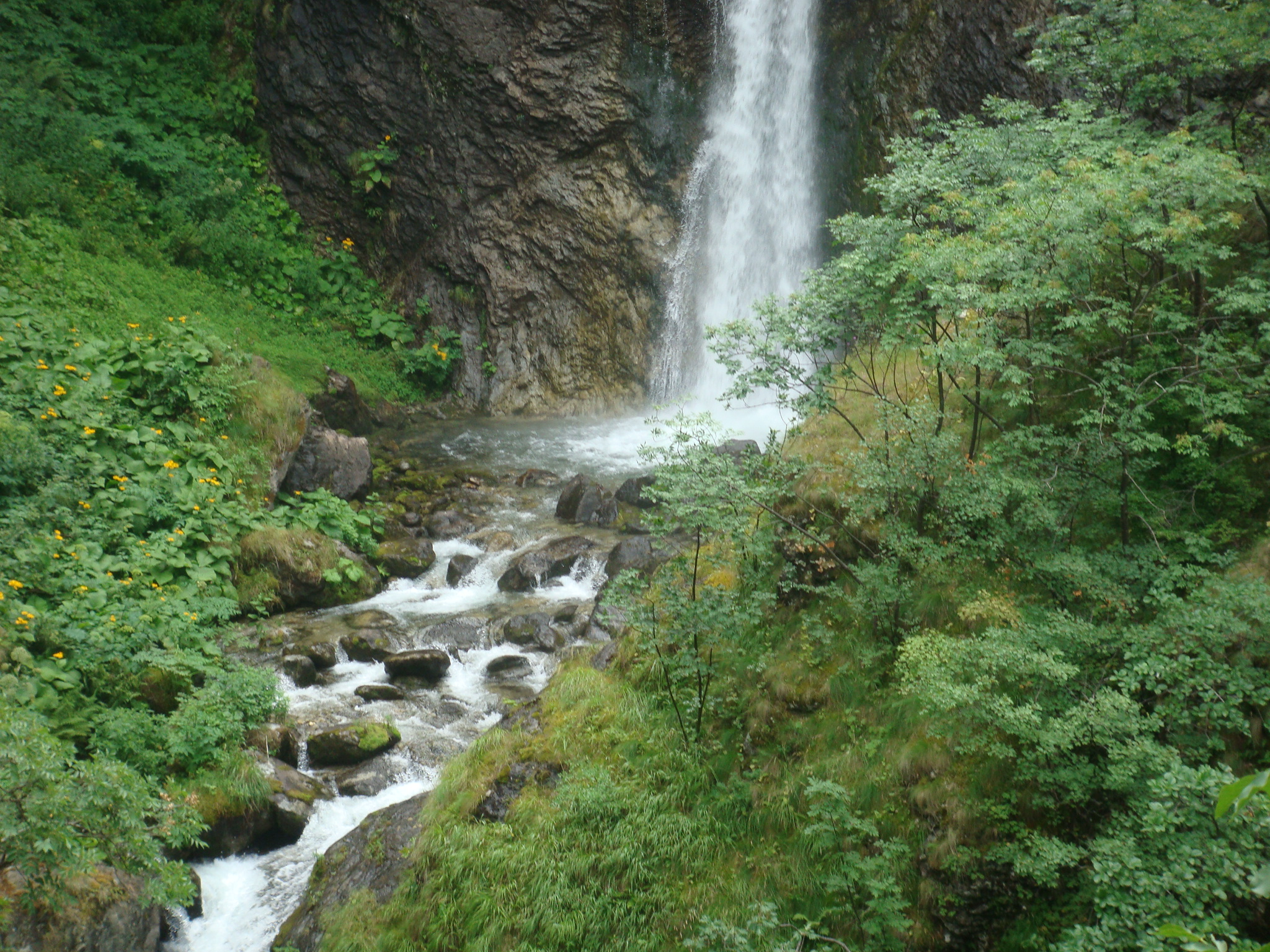

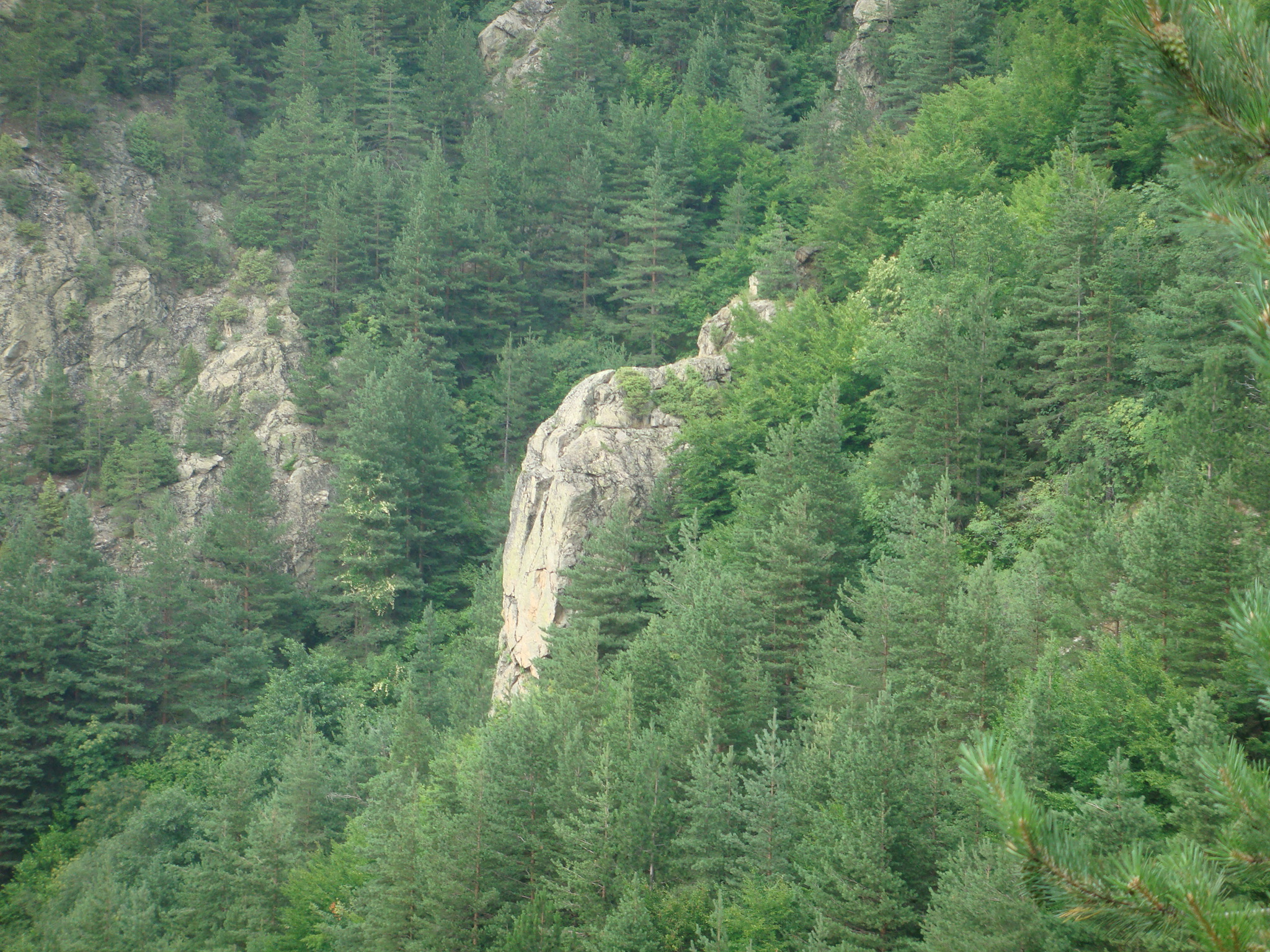
