= Saragyol =

Royal residence in Bulgaria

Coordinates: 42°13′8″N 23°37′38″E

Saragyol is a royal residence in Bulgaria. It is located on Rila mountain. Saragyol is located within the National Park "Rila".

== History ==
It was built by Ferdinand I between 1912 and 1914. After the fall of the monarchy Sitnyakovo was used by the Fish-Hunting Union.

This royal residence was returned to Tsar Simeon II in 2002 after he became prime minister. In 2014 a court decision overturned this.
