= Golyam Mermer =

Bulgarian mountain peak

Golyam Mermer (Голям Мермер)
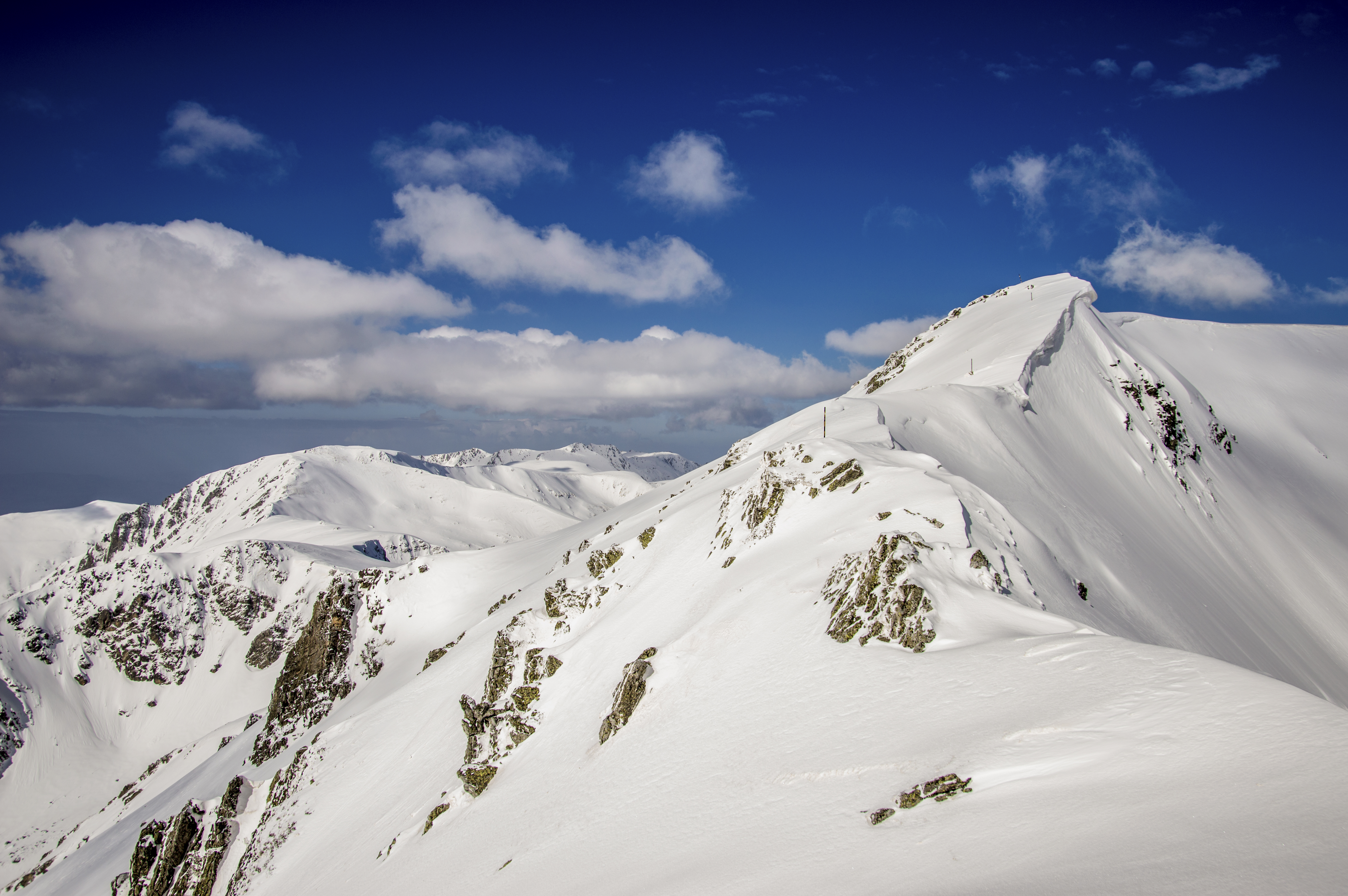

Highest point
- Elevation: 2,602 m (8,537 ft)
- Coordinates: 42°10′5.53″N 23°21′1.20″E

Geography
- Location: Bulgaria
- Parent range: Rila Mountains

Golyam Mermer (Bulgarian: Голям Мермер) is a summit in the western part of the Rila mountain range in southwestern Bulgaria reaching height of 2,602 m. It is located on the boundary between Rila National Park and Rila Monastery Nature Park.

The summit is located on the Malyovitsa ridge west of the imposing summit of Malyovitsa (2,729 m), from which it is separated through the wide Mermera saddle. The Malyovitsa ridge forms the main watershed of the Balkan Peninsula separating the Black Sea drainage basin to the north and the Aegean Sea one to the south. Northwest of Golyam Mermer are located the glacial Urdini Lakes.

South of the summit beings the Dalgia ridge, along which passes the winter trail to the Rila Monastery, situated south in the valley of the Rilska River. Along the summit passes the trail from the Malyovitsa refuge to the Ivan Vazov refuge (6 hours) and the summer trail to the Rila Monastery via the valley of the river Malka Drushlyavitsa.

== Gallery ==
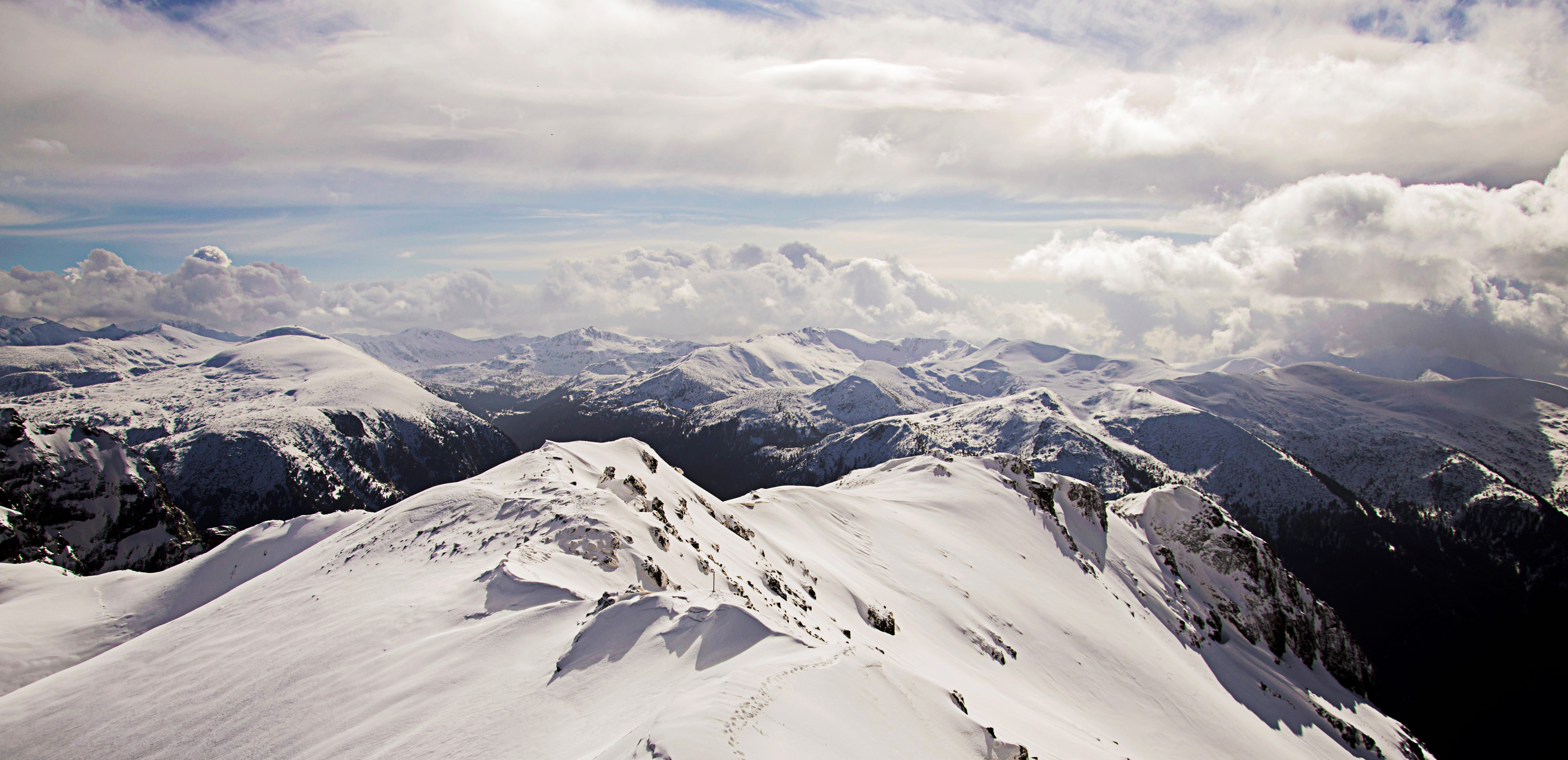

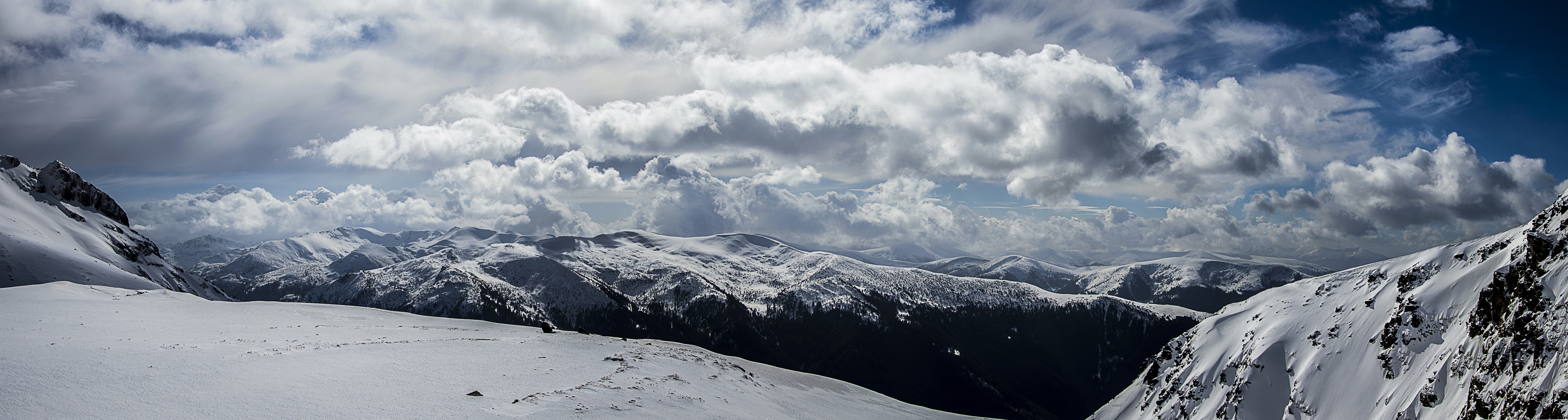
