= Sitnyakovo =

Royal residence in Bulgaria

Coordinates: 42°14′55″N 23°37′17″E

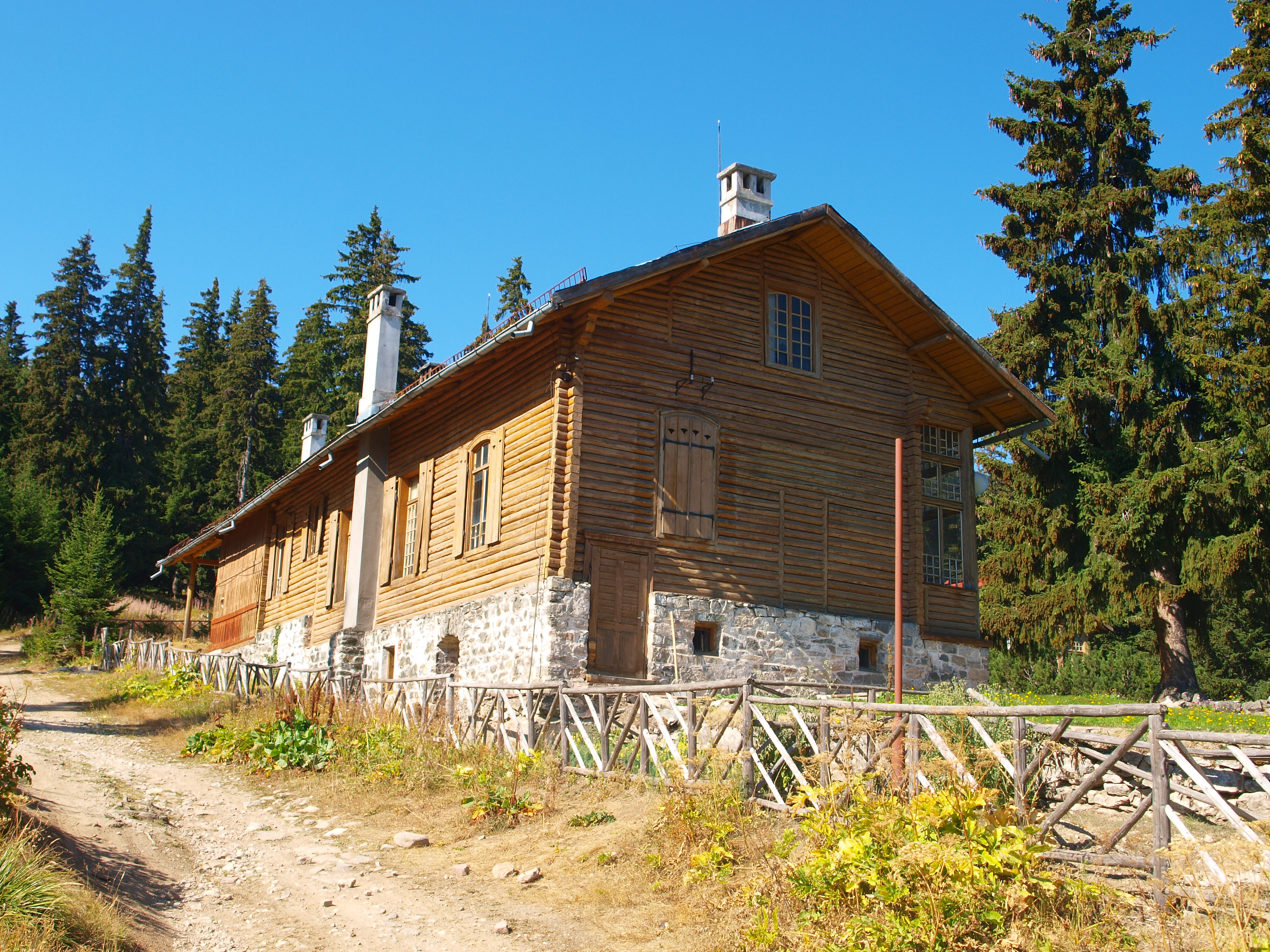
A building of Sitnyakovo

Sitnyakovo (Bulgarian: Ситняково) is a summer royal residence in Bulgaria. It is located on Rila mountain.

The residence was commissioned by Ferdinand I of Bulgaria. Sitnyakovo is situated near the Borovets resort and the Tsarska Bistritsa palace. It was designed by architect Georgi Fingov and built in 1904. The house has architectural features akin to the Tsarska Bistritsa hunting residence – the traditional utilitarian high-mountain construction with coherent art nouveau decorations and interior furnishing.

In 1913, at Sitnyakovo, Ferdinand I signed the treaty among the Balkan countries ahead of the Balkan Wars.

After the fall of the monarchy, during the communist regime, Sitnyakovo was used by the Writer's Union.

This royal residence was returned to Tsar Simeon II after the liberation in the 1990s.

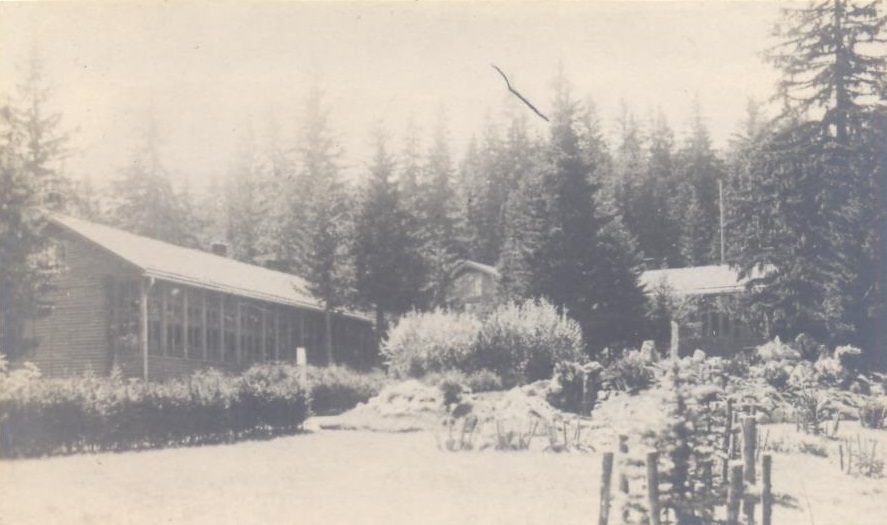
Sitnyakovo before 1944
