= Central Rila Reserve =

Nature reserve in Bulgaria

- IUCN category Ia (strict nature reserve)
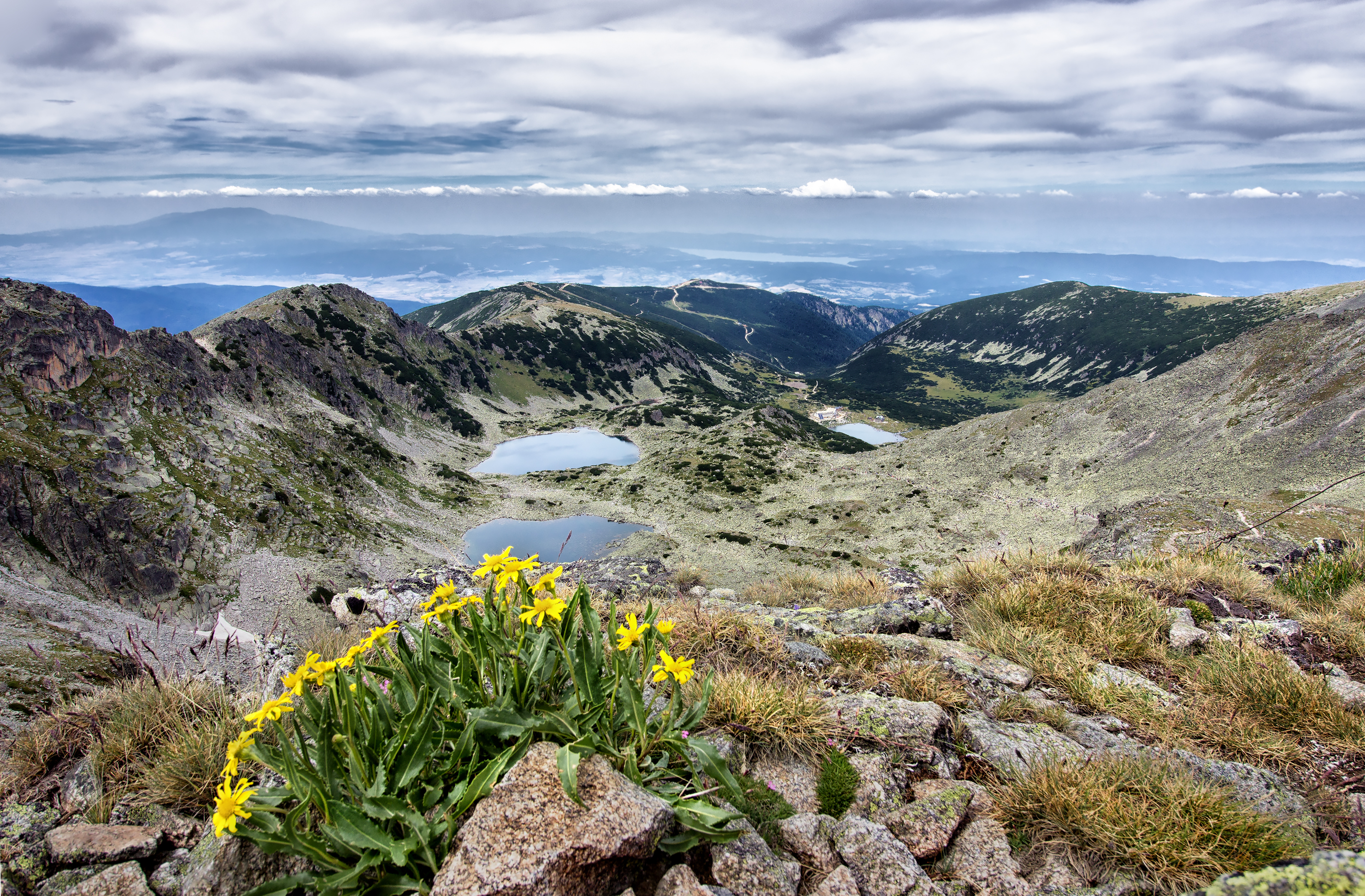

- Location within Bulgaria
- Location: Samokov Municipality, Sofia Province, Bulgaria
- Nearest city: Samokov
- Coordinates: 42°10′45″N 23°35′7″E
- Area: 124.17 km^{2} (47.94 sq mi)
- Established: 1992
- Governing body: Ministry of Environment and Water

Central Rila Reserve (Bulgarian: Централен рилски резерват) is a nature reserve in Rila National Park, located in the Rila mountain range in southwestern Bulgaria. Spanning a territory of 12417 ha or 124.17 km^{2}, it is the largest nature reserve in the nation and the Balkan Peninsula. It was declared in February 1992 to protect undisturbed primary alpine ecosystems. Upon its creation, the Central Rila Reserve included the whole territory of the previously existing since 1956 Marichini Lakes Reserve, and the latter seized to exist as a separate protected area, which had been part of the UNESCO Biosphere Reserve since 1977. It is a strict nature reserve (1st category protected territory according to Bulgarian legislation and IUCN classification).

== Geography ==
The reserve is situated in central part of Rila in the upper valleys of two of the largest rivers of Bulgaria, the Maritsa and the Iskar. The relieve is mostly alpine, with many rocky peaks, screes, meadows. The reserve encompasses the highest zones of the mountain range, including the highest summit in the Balkans Musala (2,925 m), as well are numerous other prominent peaks, such as Irechek (2,852 m), Bezimennia Vrah (2,798 m), Deno (2,790 m), Ovcharets (2,768 m), Marishki Chal (2,765 m), etc. It also contains many glacial lakes, the most prominent being the Marichini Lakes. The seven Musala Lakes lie on the northern slopes of Musala just outside of the reserve's limits. It is bisected in two unconnected parts by the valley of the river Beli Iskar and the homonymous reservoir. Administratively, it is part of Samokov Municipality, Sofia Province, within the area of the municipal center Samokov and the villages of Beli Iskar, Govedartsi and Mala Tsarkva.

== Flora and fauna ==
There are forests of Macedonian pine (Pinus peuce) and Norway spruce (Picea abies), as well as extensive formations of dwarf mountain pine (Pinus mugo) in the higher altitude zones. There are a number of rare and endemic plant species under protection, such as Anthemis orbelica, Campanula transsilvanica, Draba siliquosa, Gentiana lutea, Gentiana puntata, Geum bulgaricum, Primula deorum, Soldanella pusilla, Rhodiola rosea, Valeriana montana, Nardus stricta, Juniperus communis, Vaccinium vitis-idaea, etc.

The fauna of the Central Rila Reserve is diverse, with a number of rare species of conservational importance, including brown bear, gray wolf, European pine marten, chamois, roe deer, wild boar, black woodpecker, western capercaillie, hazel grouse, common European viper, European green lizard, viviparous lizard, river trout, etc.

== Gallery ==
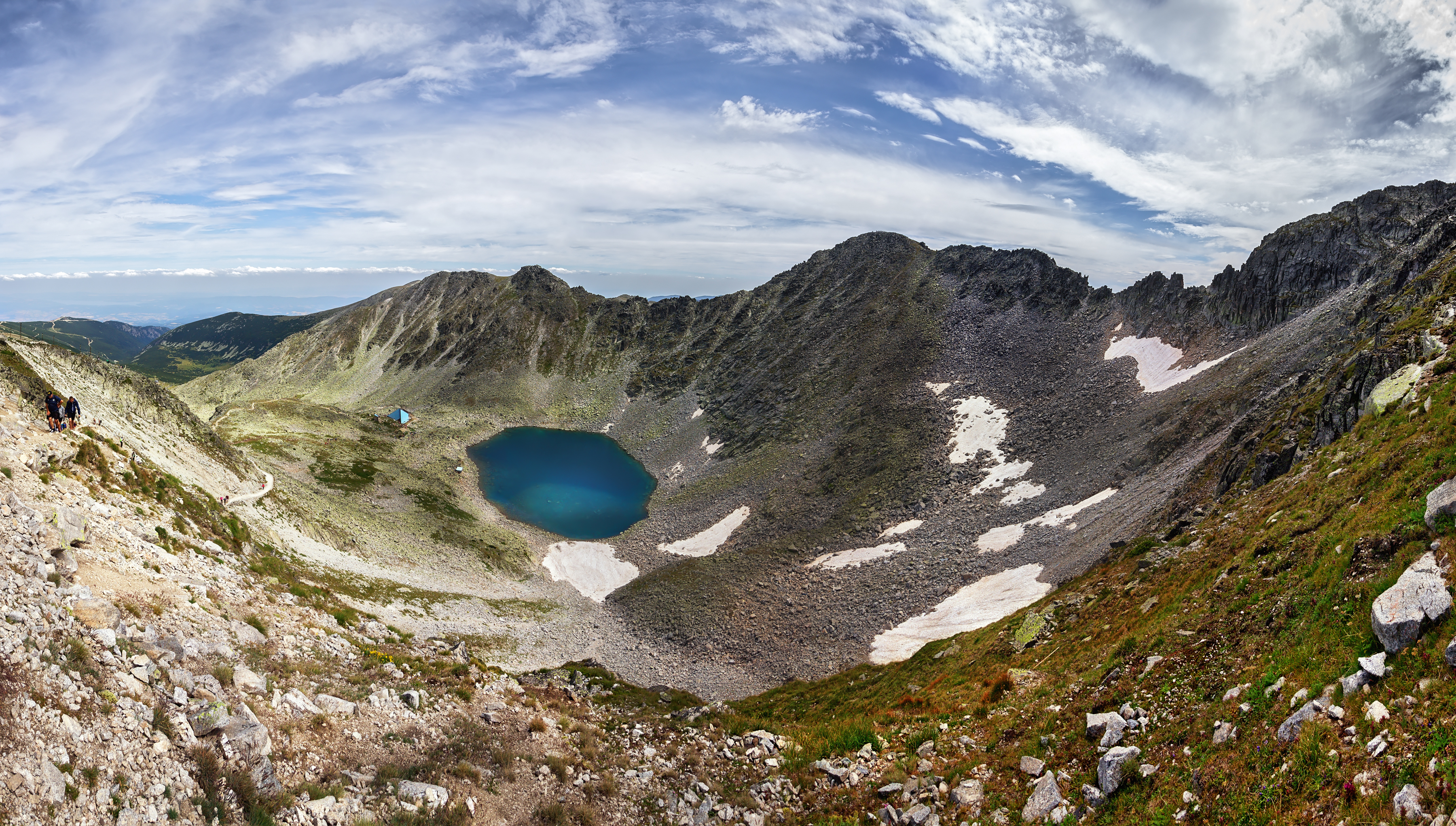
A view of the Musala Lakes

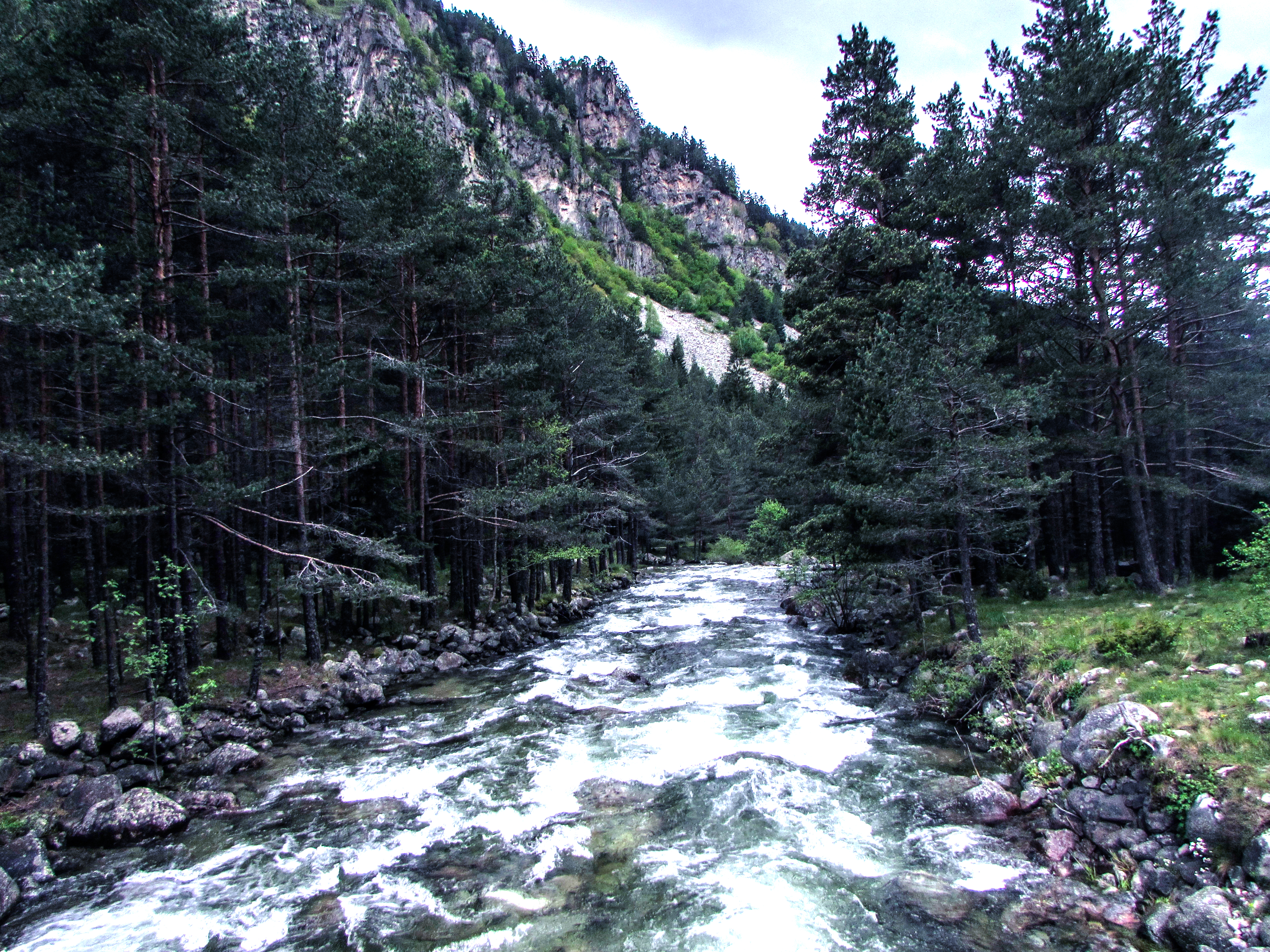
A river in the reserve

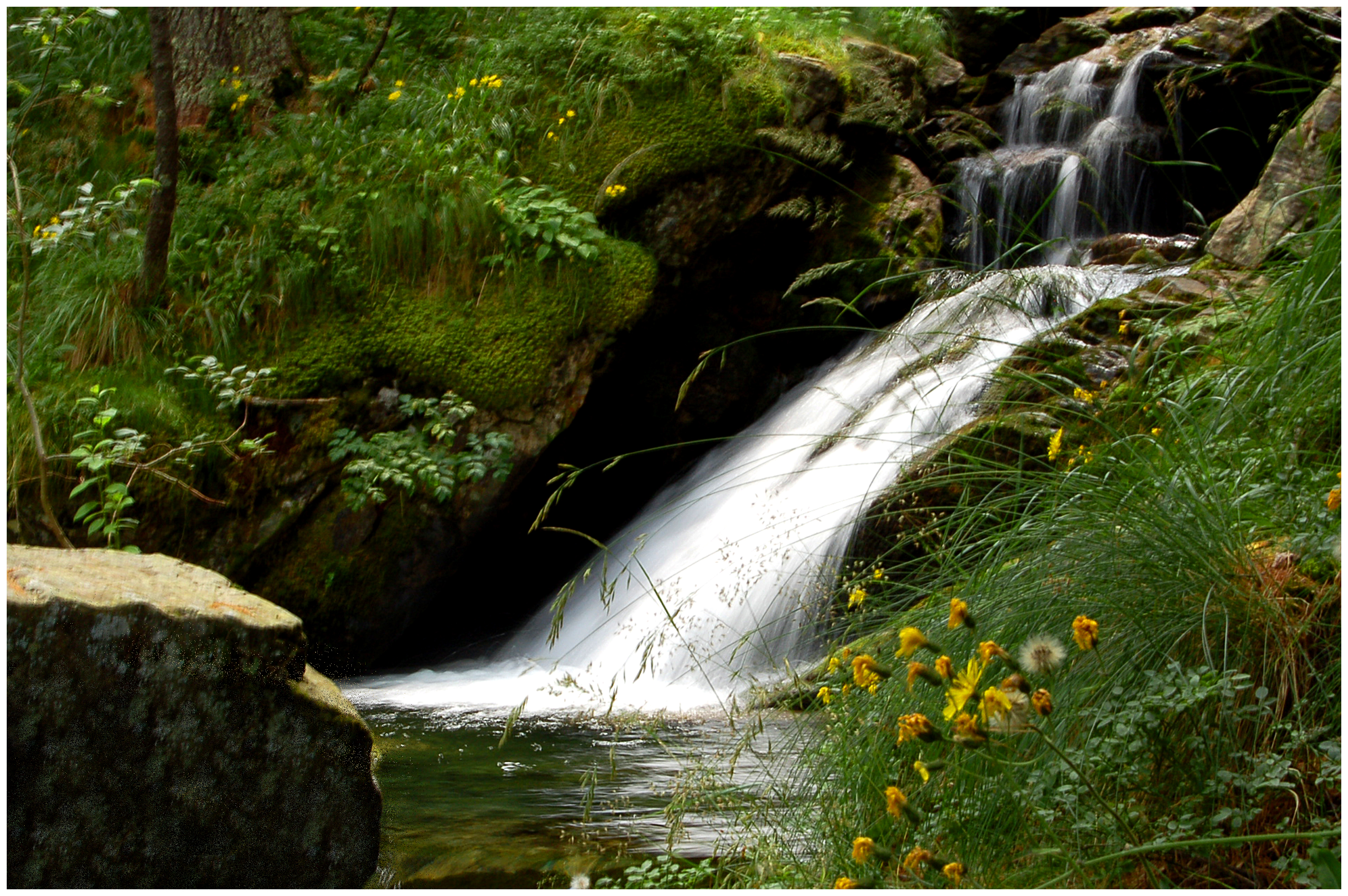
A small fall

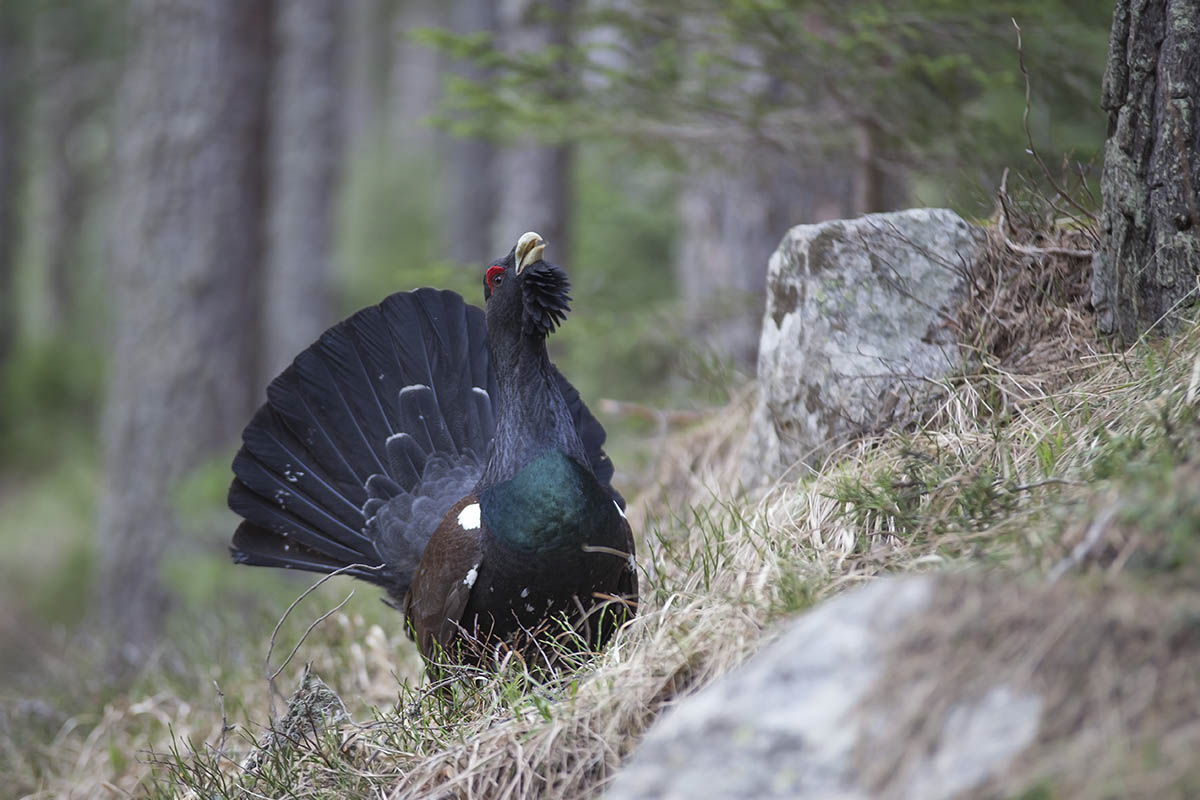
A western capercaillie in the reserve
