= Musala Lakes =

Glacial lakes in Bulgaria

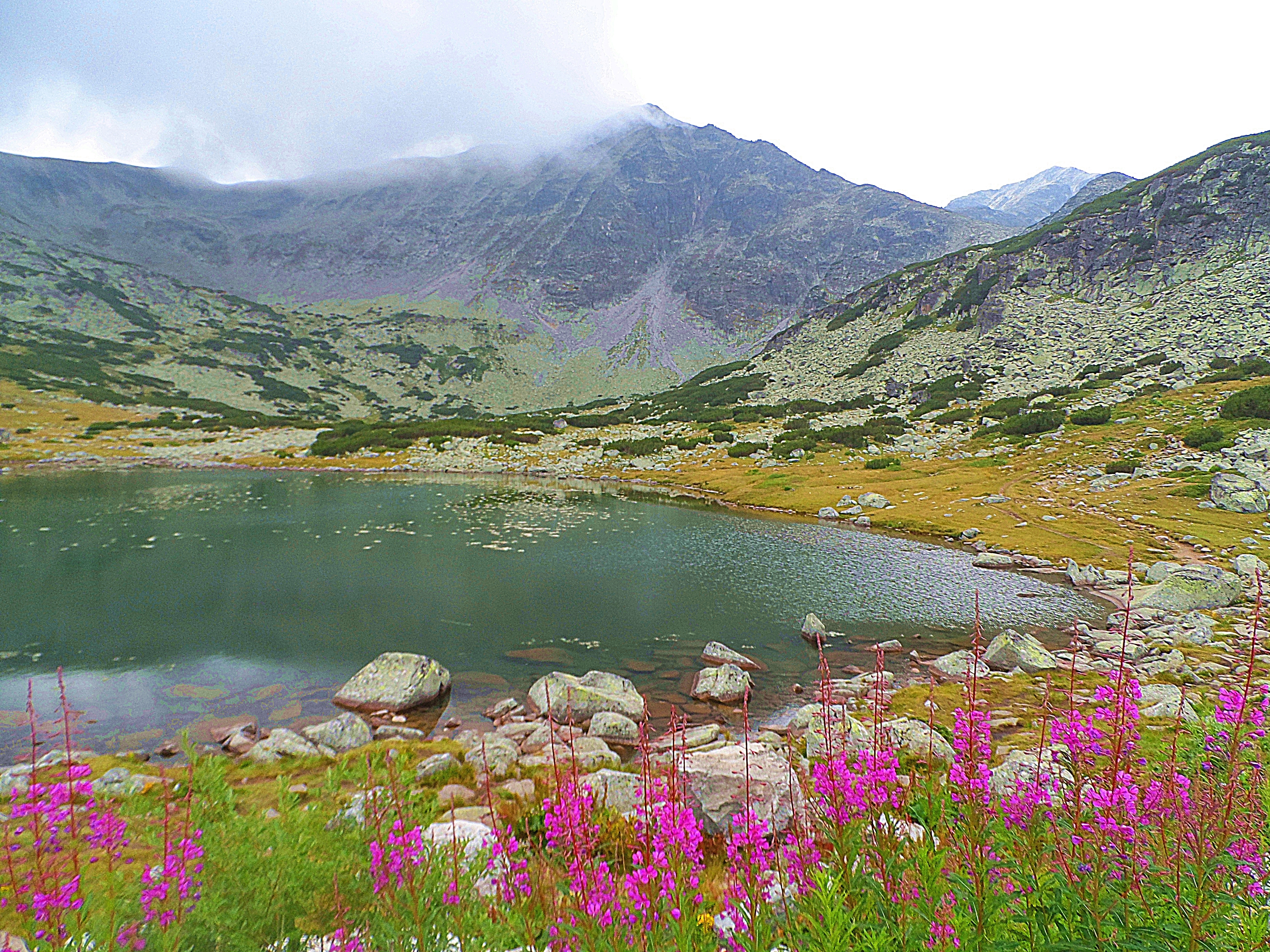

- Location within Bulgaria
- Coordinates: 42°12′0″N 23°36′0″E
- Primary inflows: precipitation
- Basin countries: Bulgaria
- Surface area: 9,650 m^{2} (103,900 sq ft)
- Max. depth: 16.4 m (54 ft)
- Surface elevation: 2,322 m (7,618 ft) to 2,709 m (8,888 ft)

Musala Lakes (Bulgarian: Мусаленски езера) are a group of seven glacial lakes situated in the Rila mountain range of southwestern Bulgaria at an altitude between 2,322 m and 2,709 m.

== Location ==
Administratively, the group of lakes belongs to Samokov Municipality of Sofia Province. The seven Musala lakes are situated in the homonymous cirque and belong to the basin of the river Musalenska Bistritsa, a tributary of the Iskar. To the east is situated the summit of Deno (2,790 m), to the southeast is Irechek (2,852 m), to the south are Musala (2,925 m) and Malka Musala (2,902 m), to the west is the valley of Beli Iskar river.

The lakes are formed in three interconnected cascading cirques, giving rise to the glacial valley of the Musalenska Bistritsa, which starts at Rila's highest summit Musala and reaches the winter resort of Borovets further downstream in a northern direction, in the northern foothills of Rila. The first cirque, measuring 740 × 490 m, hosts the first lake. The second, third and fourth lakes are located on three levels in the second cascade cirque Aleko. The next three lakes are located in another cascading cirque measuring 1500 × 500 m, known as the Karakashev cirque. The connection of the last two circuses takes place between the fourth and seventh lakes.

== Geology ==
Geologically, the Musale Lakes fall entirely within the Musala body of the Rila-Western Rhodope batholith, built up of medium- to coarse-grained granite dating from the Bartonian age 40 to 35 million years old. The granite are leucocratic, light gray to gray-white, with a massive uniform-grained texture. The structure is poikilitic and hypidiomorpho-grained. The main rock-forming minerals are plagioclase, orthoclase, quartz and biotite. Amphibole is rare; the accessory minerals are allanite, zircon, xenotime, monazite, apatite and ore minerals.

== Lakes ==
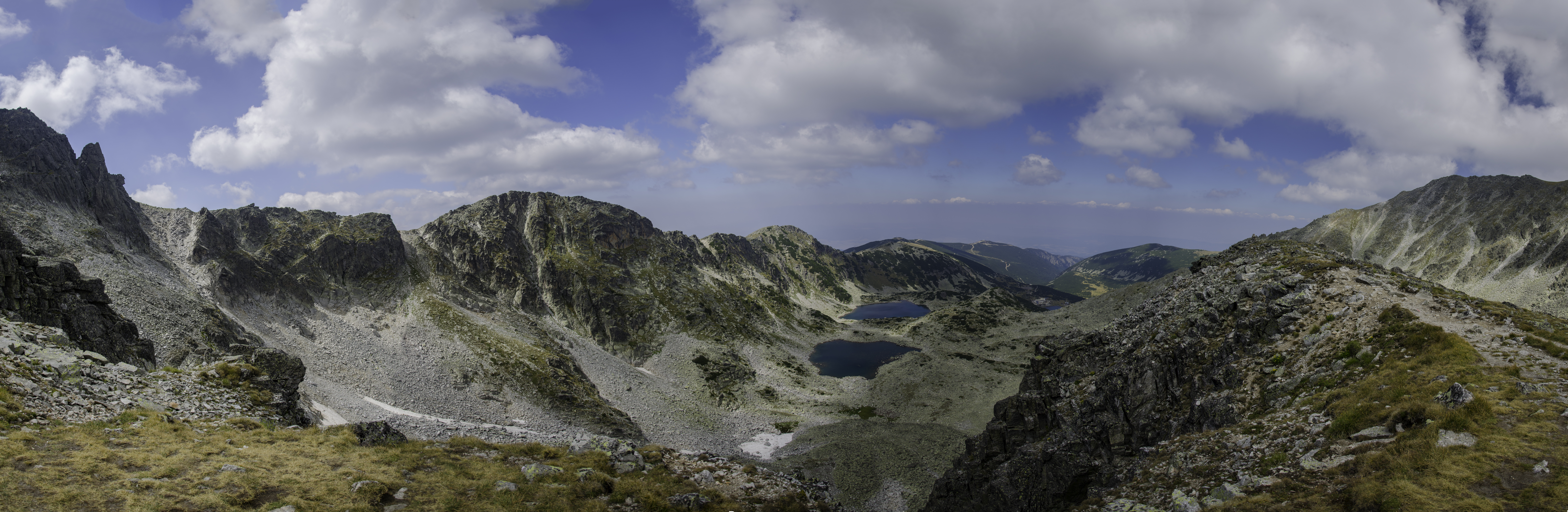
Aleko cirque with the second, third and fourth lakes

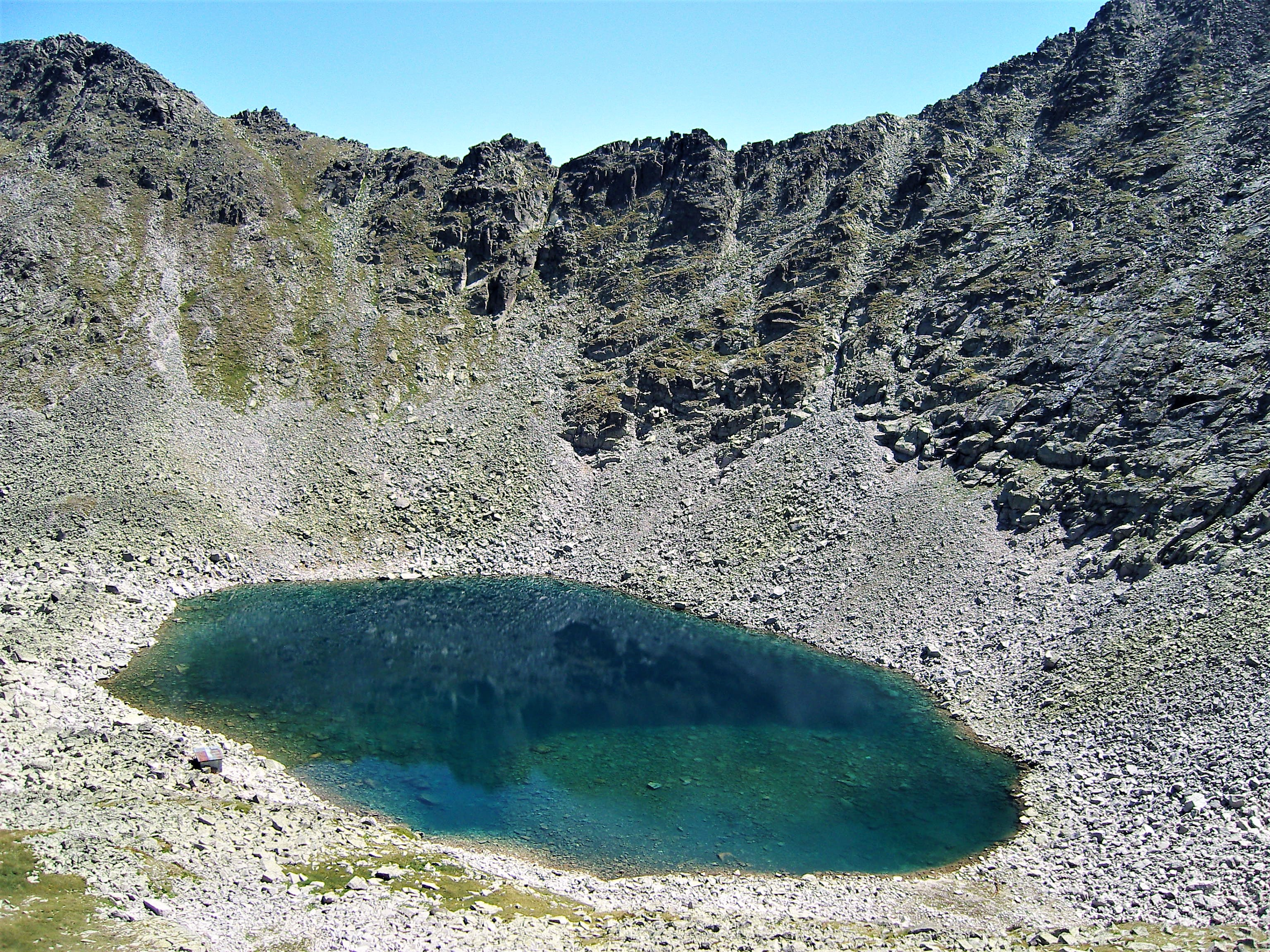
Icy Lake

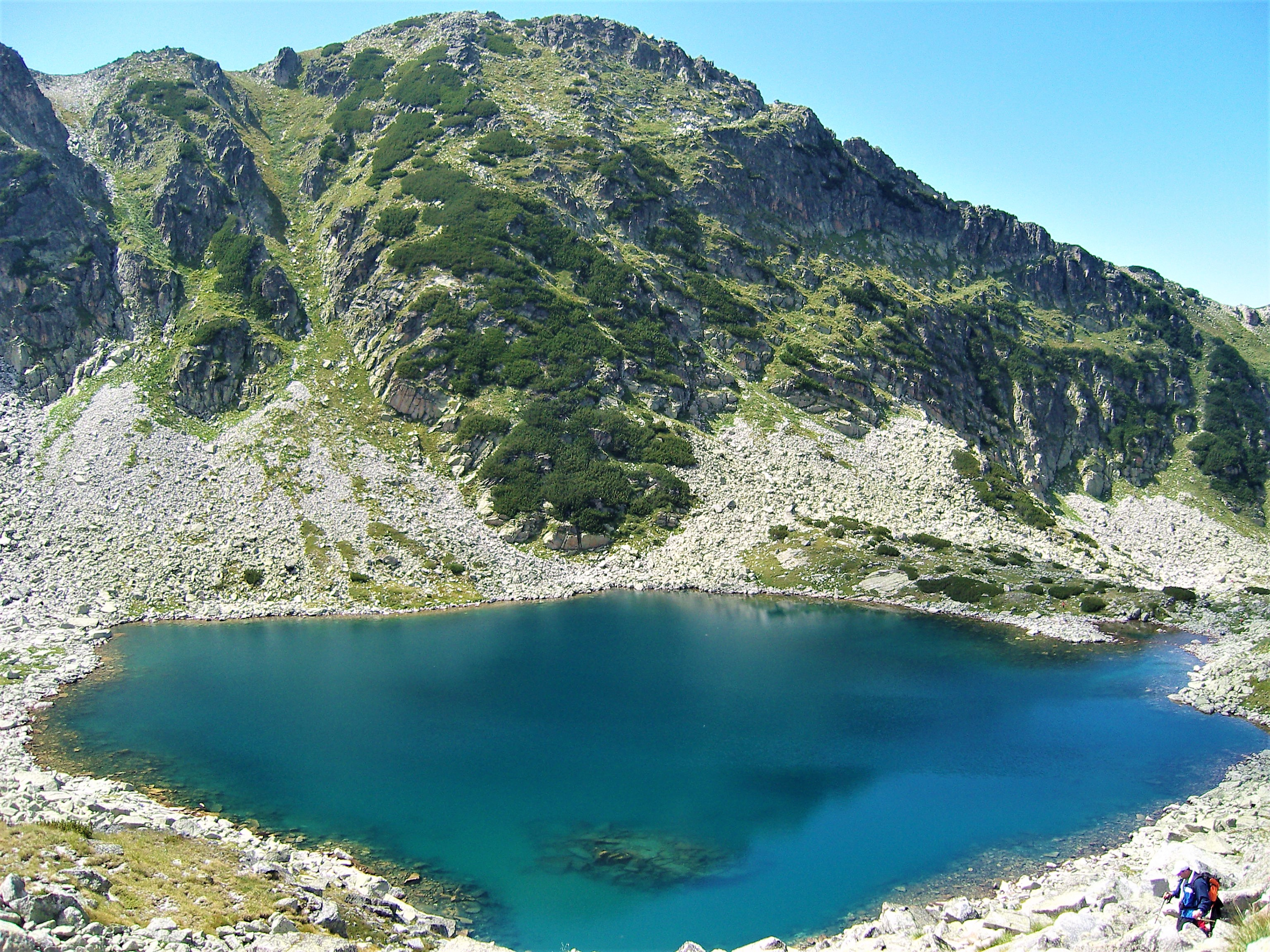
Alekovo Lake

=== First lake ===
The first lake is the highest in the group and is also called the Icy Lake. Situated in a small cirque at 365 m to the northeast of Mount Musala, the lake lies at an altitude of 2,709 m, which makes it the highest one in the Rila and on the Balkan peninsula. It has an area of 1.8 ha and a depth of 16.4 m, which makes it the third largest and deepest of the group. Its shape is oval, slightly elongated; the slopes are steep and covered with scree. The highest water temperature during the summer reaches 7.8 °C on the surface, and decreases to 5.1 °C in depth.

=== Second lake ===
The second lake, also called the Upper or Nameless Lake, as it is located in the Aleko cirque at the foothills of the summit Bezimennia Vrah (2,792 m), is located 133 m below the first lake, at 800 m north of Musala, at an altitude of 2,576 m. It has an area of 1.24 ha and a depth of 5.8 m. It is watered via underground passage from the Ice Lake.

=== Third lake ===
The third lake, known as Alekovo Lake, is located in the middle level of Aleko cirque 32 m below the second one, at the foothills of Aleko peak, at 1,160 m north-northwest of Musala at an altitude of 2,544 m above. The lake has an area of 2.39 ha and a depth of 14 m. Water inflow and outflow are underground.

=== Fourth lake ===
The fourth lake, called Ferdinandovo Lake, is located 58 m below the third one and 1,650 m north of Musala at an altitude of 2,486 m above. It is of variable area and depth and occupies the lowest level of the Aleko cirque. There is no visible inflow and outflow of water, and at the end of summer the lake significantly reduces its volume. Its surface area is 0.9 ha.

=== Fifth lake ===
The fifth lake is located 93 m below the fourth, at 1,500 m north-northeast of Musala, at an altitude of 2,393 m. It is known as Karakashevo Lake. It has an area of 2.62 ha, which makes t is the largest of the group, and a depth of 6.6 m. .

=== Sixth lake ===
The sixth lake is located at 1,770 m north of Musala at an altitude of 2,391 m. It has an area of 0.26 ha and is the smallest of the group. Its depth does not exceed 0.5 m.

=== Seventh lake ===
The seventh, also known as the Lower Lake, is located at 1,890 m north of Musala at an altitude of 2,389 m. It has an area of 1.34 ha and a depth of 1.6 m. The Musala refuge is situated on its northern shore.
