= Bezimennia Vrah =

Bulgarian mountain peak

Bezimennia Vrah (Безименния връх)
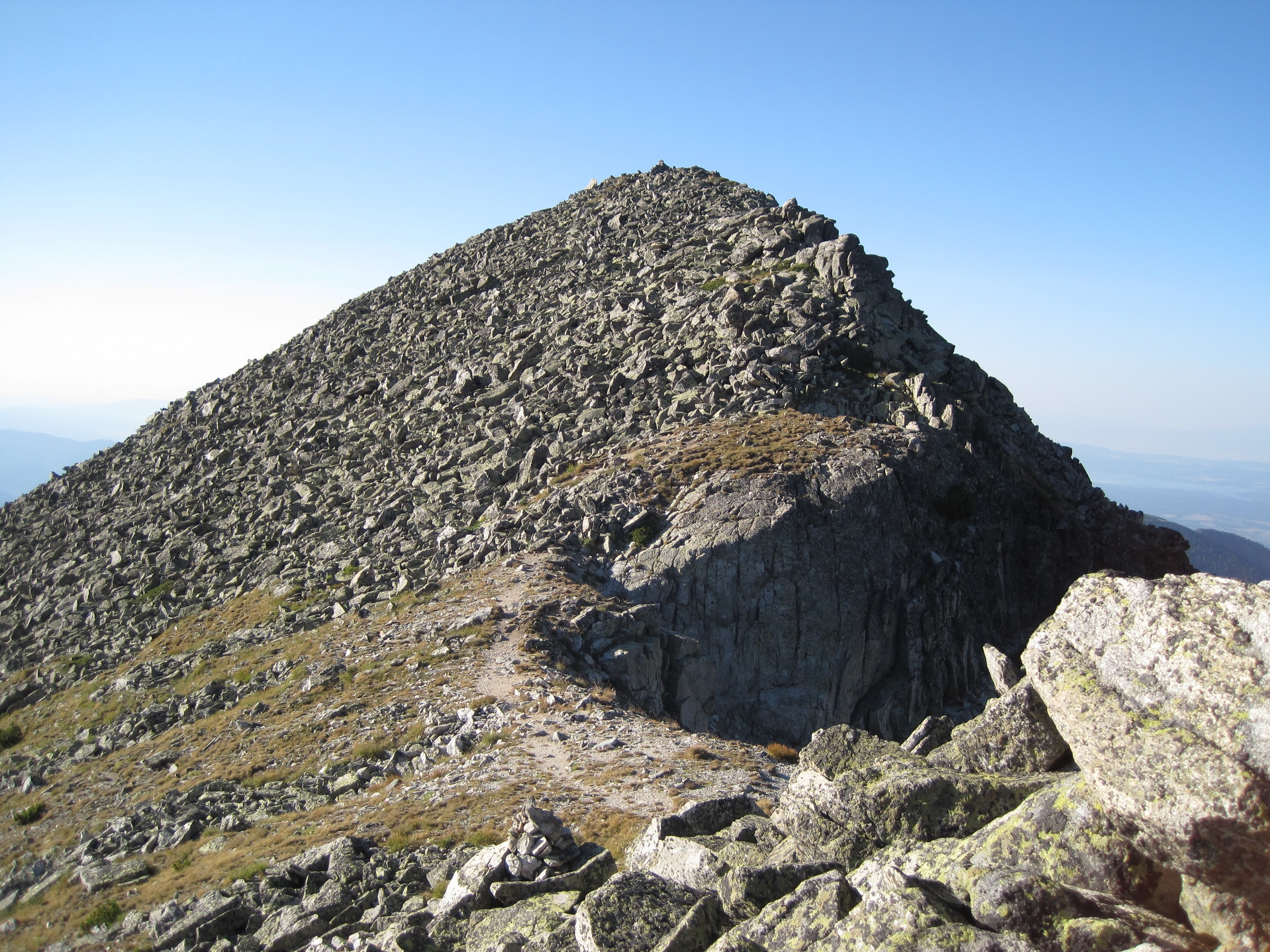

Highest point
- Elevation: 2,792 m (9,160 ft)
- Coordinates: 42°11′13.6″N 23°36′10.3″E

Geography
- Location: Bulgaria
- Parent range: Rila Mountains

Bezimennia Vrah (Bulgarian: Безименния връх, meaning "the Nameless Summit"), is a summit in eastern Rila mountain range in southwestern Bulgaria. Reaching a height of 2,798 m, it is the fourth highest summit in the mountain range behind Musala (2,925 m), Malka Musala (2,902 m) and Irechek (2,852 m). Bezimennia Vrah is located in Rila National Park. For a short time, it was called Druzhba, meaning "friendship".

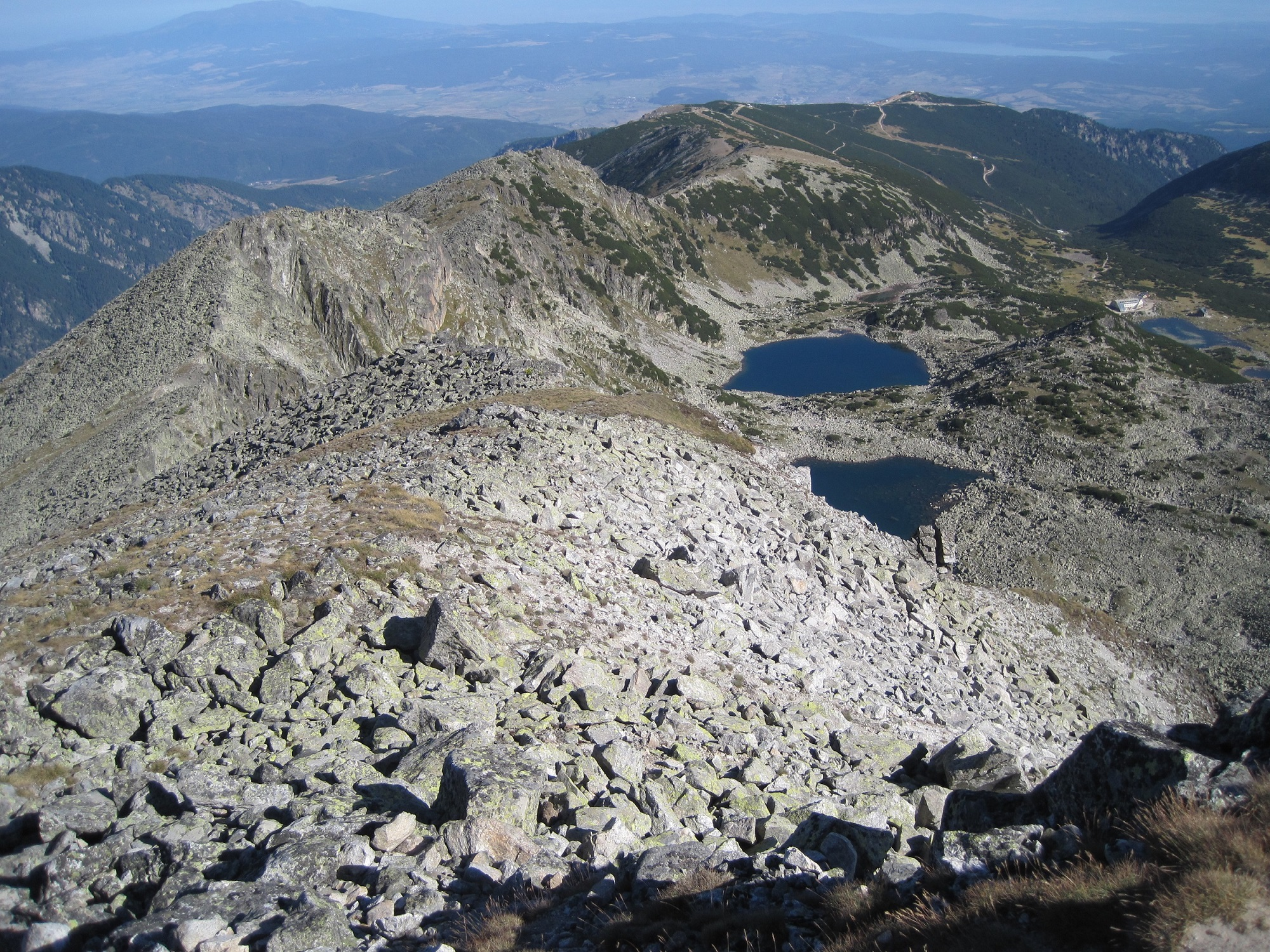
Bezimennia Vrah, Aleko and Musala Lakes

Bezimennia Vrah is the first peak of the ridge that starts from Musala and spans in northwestern direction, surrounding the Musala cirque from the west. In its upper part the ridge is rocky, with unstable stone debris; in its lower part it is grassy and is known as Markudzhika. There is no marked hiking trail along the crest of the ridge, and traversing its rocky part is not suitable for inexperienced hikers.

The summit is separated from the neighbouring Musala and Aleko (2,713 m) by rocky saddles. Bezimennia Vrah is dome-shaped, covered with large boulders and fragmented unstable rock material. Its eastern slopes descend steeply towards the second step of the Musala cirque; at its foothills is the second of the Musala Lakes, the Nameless Lake. The granite north face of the summit is a climbing site. Its western slope is very steep and reaches all the way to the deep valley of the river Beli Iskar. Climbing and cutting the Nameless Peak should be done with caution due to the instability of the terrain and the precipices.
