= Musalenska Bistritsa =

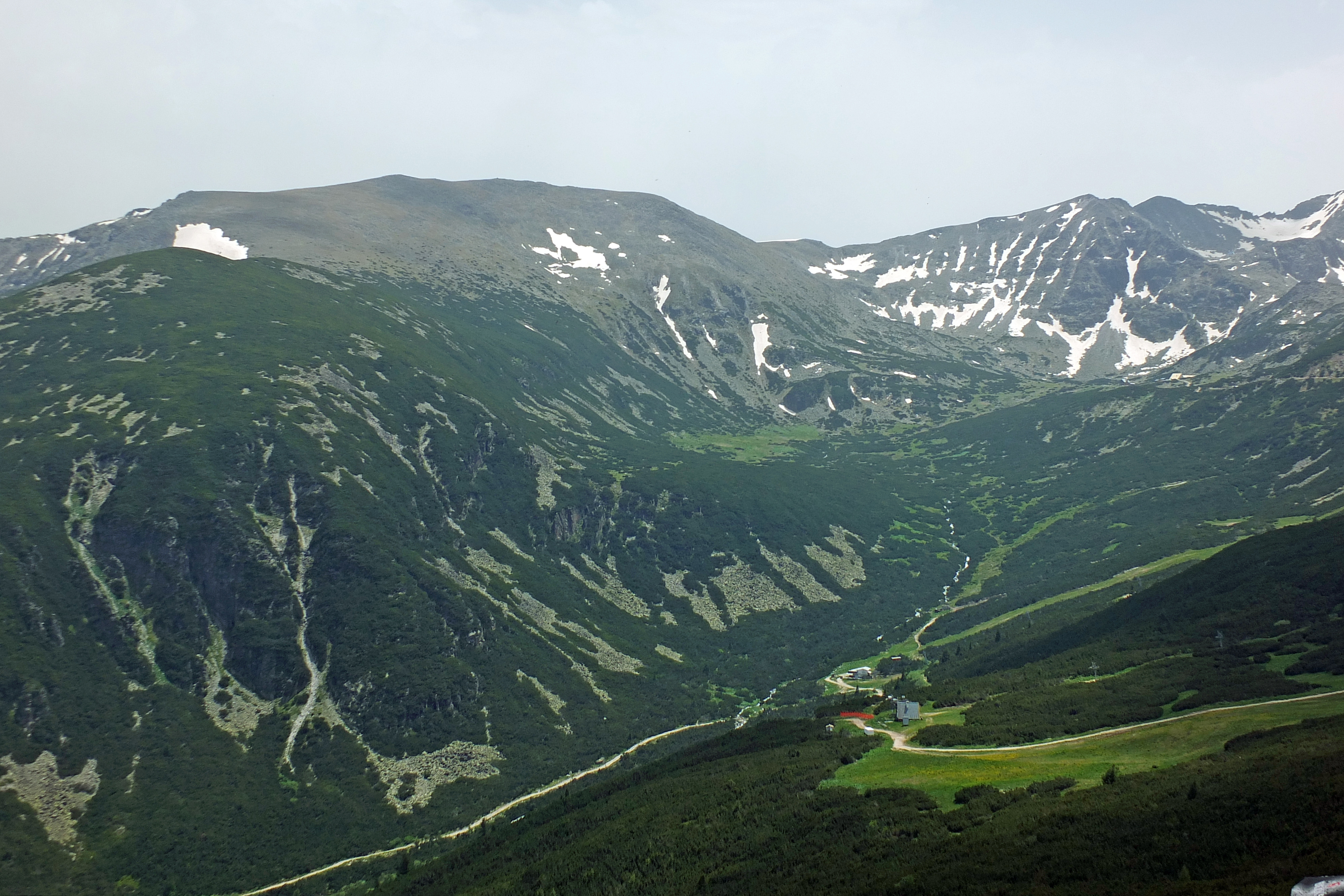
- The valley of Musalenska Bistritsa

Location
- Country: Bulgaria

Physical characteristics
- Source
  - location: Musala Lakes, Rila
  - coordinates: 42°10′53.04″N 23°35′24″E
  - elevation: 2,709 m (8,888 ft)
- Mouth
  - location: Iskar
  - coordinates: 42°19′23.16″N 23°33′15.12″E
  - elevation: 964 m (3,163 ft)
- Length: 19 km (12 mi)
- Basin size: 57 km^{2} (22 sq mi)

Basin features
- Progression: Iskar→ Danube→ Black Sea

The Musalenska Bistritsa (Bulgarian: Мусаленска Бистрица) is a 19 km-long river in western Bulgaria, a right tributary of the river Iskar.

== Geography ==
The river takes its source from the Icy Lake, the highest of the Musala Lakes at an altitude of 2,709 m, north of the summit of Musala (2,925 m), the highest peak in Bulgaria and the Balkan Peninsula. It flows in a glacial valley along the western slopes of the summit of Deno (2,790 m). Until the Borovets ski resort the river valley is deep and forested. Downstream of Borovets it enters the Samokov Valley. There river flows into the Iskar at an altitude of 964 m in the southwestern part the town of Samokov.

Its drainage basin covers a territory of 57 km^{2} or 0.6% of Iskar's total and is the highest drainage basin in Bulgaria. The main tributaries are the Solenata Voda (right), the Malka Bistritsa (left) and the Lukovitsa (right).

The Malki Iskar has predominantly snow feed with high water in April–June and low water in August–October. The average annual discharge at Borovets is 0.5 m^{3}/s.

== Transport and economy ==
The river flows entirely in Samokov Municipality of Sofia Province. There are no settlements along its course, but it passes through one of Bulgaria's largest ski resorts, Borovets. An 8 km stretch of the second class II-82 road Kostenets–Samokov–Sofia follows its valley. Its waters are utilised for irrigation. There are tourist tracks along the river leading to Musala.
