= Marishki Chal =

Bulgarian mountain peak

Marishki Chal (Маришки чал)
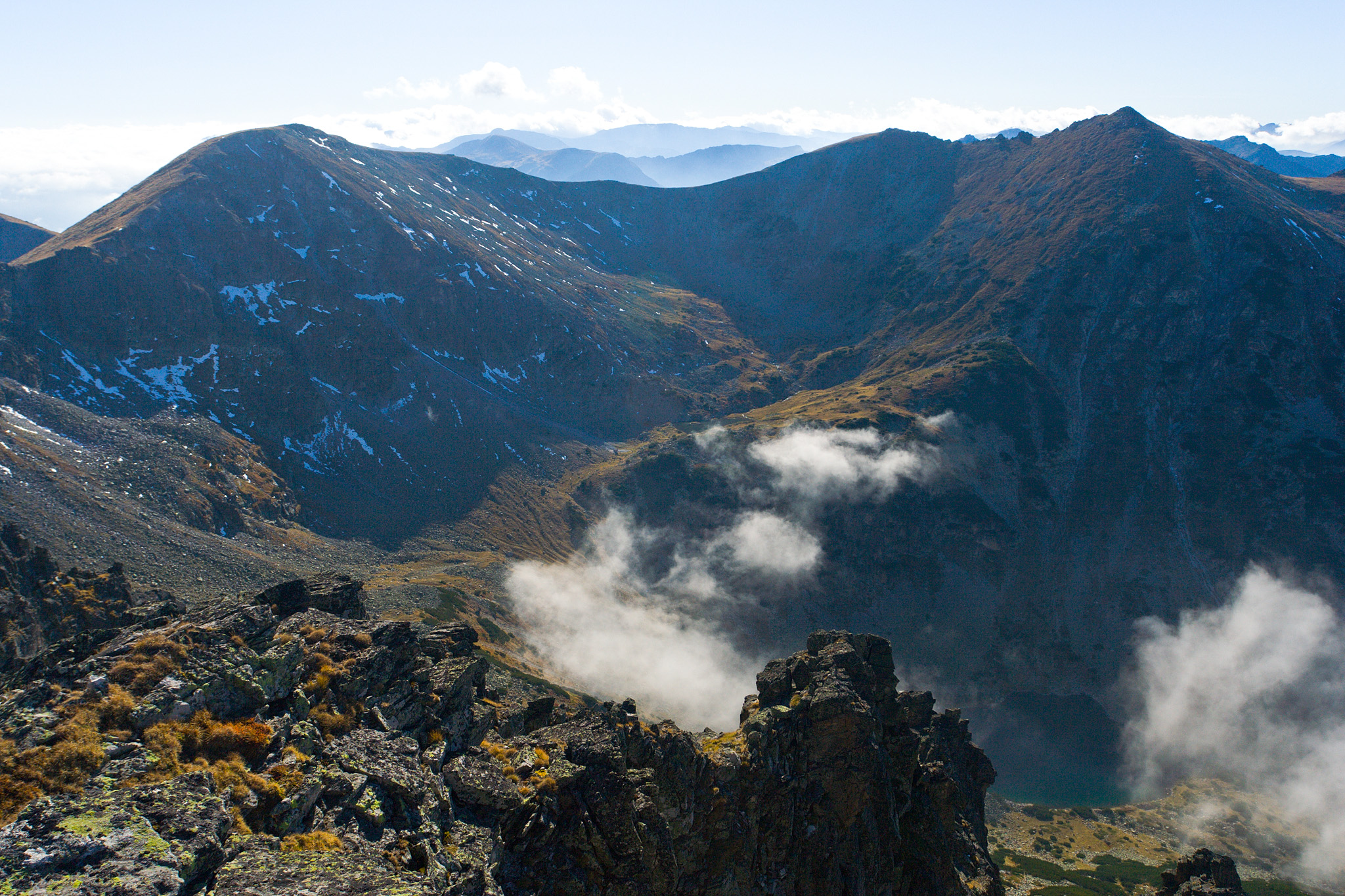
- Marishki Chal (left) and Bliznaka (right) seen from Mancho

Highest point
- Elevation: 2,765 m (9,072 ft)
- Coordinates: 42°09′15.50″N 23°35′36.56″E

Geography
- Location: Bulgaria
- Parent range: Rila Mountains

Marishki Chal (Bulgarian: Маришки чал) is a summit in the eastern part of the Rila mountain range in southwestern Bulgaria reaching height of 2,765 m. It is located in Rila National Park. The summit is built up of granite.

== Geography ==
Marishki Chal connects the two main ridges of this part of the mountain range — Musalensko and Ibarsko, and is an important hydrographic node. It rises south of the summit of Golyam Bliznak (2,779 m), north of Ovcharets (2,768 m) and southwest of Mancho (2,771 m).

The summit lies on the main watershed ridge of the Balkan Peninsula, separating the Black Sea drainage basin to the north and the Aegean Sea one to the south. The drainage basins of the three major rivers in Rila converge at Marishki Chal — the Iskar of the Black Sean basin, the longest river entirely in Bulgarian territory, the Maritsa, the longest river flowing entirely in the Balkans, and the Mesta, the latter two of the Aegean Sean basin.

Marishki Chal is dome-shaped. Its ridge and most of its slopes are grassy and stony, only the northern slope descending steeply to Marichinia cirque of the Marichini Lakes is rocky. The eastern slopes descend to the cirque of the Ropalishki Lakes, and the western slopes — to the very deep valley of the Beli Iskar River.

== History ==
In the past the summit was also called the Triple Border Peak (Триграничния връх), as in the aftermath of the Congress of Berlin of 1878 the borders of the Principality of Bulgaria, Eastern Rumelia and the Ottoman Empire converged on it. In 1885 Eastern Rumelia joined the Principality during the Unification of Bulgaria and in 1912 the Bulgarian victory in the First Balkan War led to the liberation of the whole mountain range.

== Tourist routes ==
The summer and winter trails between the highest summit in the Balkans Musala (2,925 m) and the Zavracitsa refuge pass through Marishki Char. The summer trail cuts almost horizontally along its southwestern slope, and the winter trail passes through its highest point. In winter, there is an increased avalanche danger on its slopes and following the azimuth marking is mandatory. The summer trail between Musala and Granchar refuge crosses the western slope of the summit, and the winter trail passes almost over its highest point and heads southwest.

Marishki Chal is approximately 40 minutes from the neighbouring summit of Golyam Bliznak peak and 30 minutes from the peaks of Ovcharets and Mancho.
