= Most isolated major summits of Europe =

The most isolated major summits of Europe by topographic isolation are located in the European continent and its tectonic and geographic boundaries. This includes major mountain peaks of fold and fault-block mountains, and also volcanoes, located not only in the European Mainland, but also those located on lands and islands on the limits of Europe, like the North Atlantic Ocean islands of the Azores and Iceland, the Arctic Ocean islands of Jan Mayen, Svalbard archipelago and Novaya Zemlya archipelago, the Mediterranean island of Sicily, the Ural Mountains, and Mount Elbrus. The last mentioned is HP of the transboundary Caucasus Mountains and Greater Caucasus region, but as a geologically separate stratovolcano, it is entirely laying in Europe (and Russia), 20 km (12 mi) north of the main ridge of the Greater Caucasus, considered as the one that is forming the limits of Europe. The definition excludes island clearly lying on the African Plate and outside the geographic limits of Europe, like the Canaries and Madeira. The active volcano of Mount Etna is somehow on, or just outside the boundaries of the Eurasian Plate, resting on the subduction boundary where the African tectonic plate is being pushed under the Eurasian plate, but geographically is part of Europe, and is also included in the Top 10 lists.

== List by topographic isolation of major peaks with elevation of more than 2,500m ==
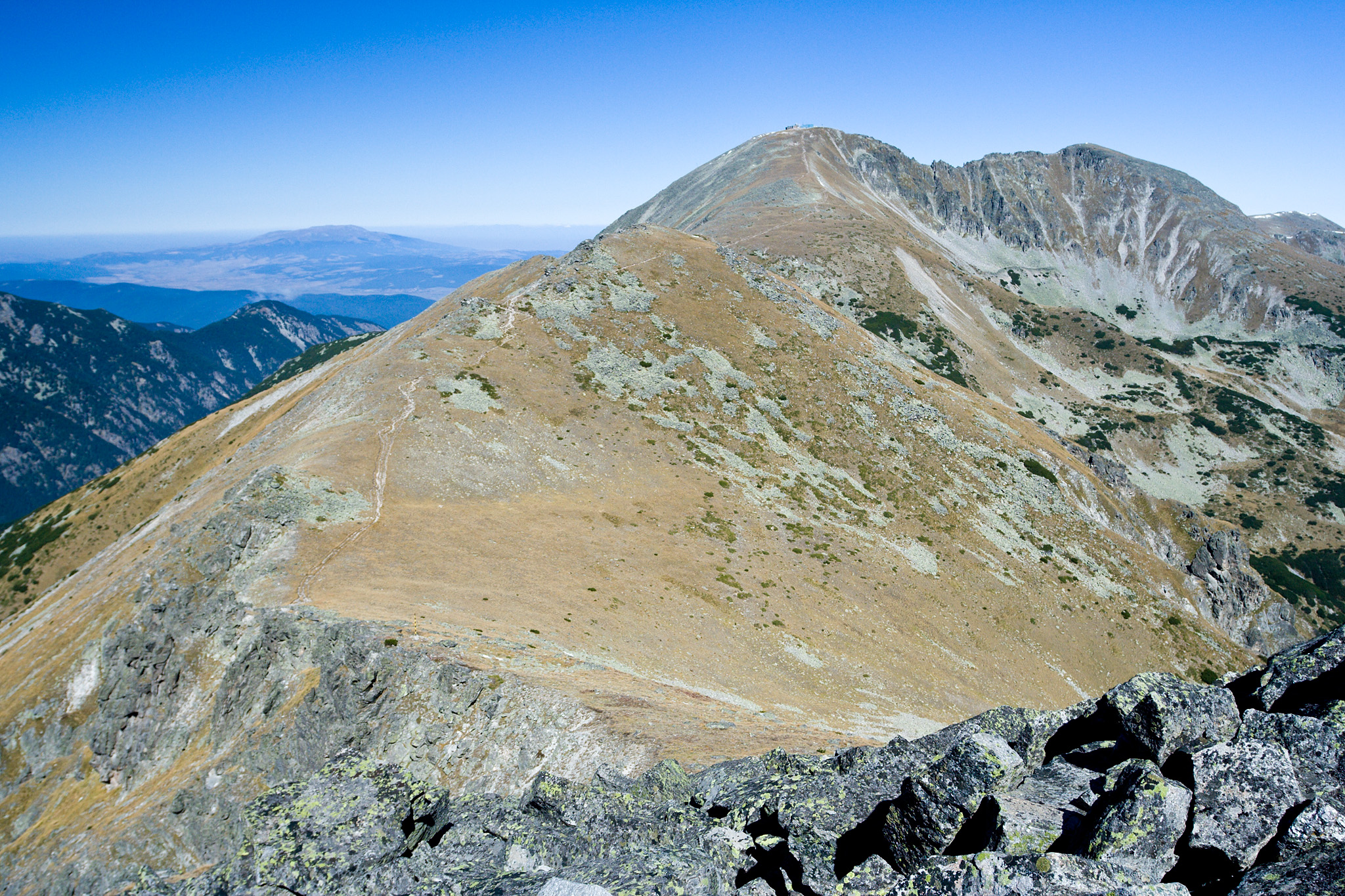
Musala seen from the south

Rank	Mountain	Country	Range	Isolation	Elevation
1	Mont Blanc	France / Italy	Graian Alps	2,812 kilometres (1,747 mi)	4,810 metres (15,780 ft)
2	Elbrus	Russia	Western Caucasus	2,469.9 kilometres (1,534.7 mi)	5,642 metres (18,510 ft)
3	Mount Etna	Italy	Island of Sicily	998.79 kilometres (620.62 mi)	3,323 metres (10,902 ft)
4	Musala	Bulgaria	Rila-Rhodope massif	810 kilometres (500 mi)	2,925 metres (9,596 ft)
5	Mulhacén	Spain	Penibaetic System	526.3 kilometres (327.0 mi)	3,479 metres (11,414 ft)
6	Gerlachovský štít	Slovakia	Tatra Mountains	510 kilometres (320 mi)	2,655 metres (8,711 ft)
7	Aneto	Spain	Pyrenees Mountains	507.5 kilometres (315.3 mi)	3,404 metres (11,168 ft)
8	Corno Grande	Italy	Apennine Mountains	445.3 kilometres (276.7 mi)	2,912 metres (9,554 ft)
9	Moldoveanu Peak	Romania	Southern Carpathians	387.1 kilometres (240.5 mi)	2,544 metres (8,346 ft)
10	Torre Cerredo	Spain	Cantabrian Mountains	346.5 kilometres (215.3 mi)	2,648 metres (8,688 ft)

== List by topographic isolation of major peaks with elevation of more than 2,000m ==
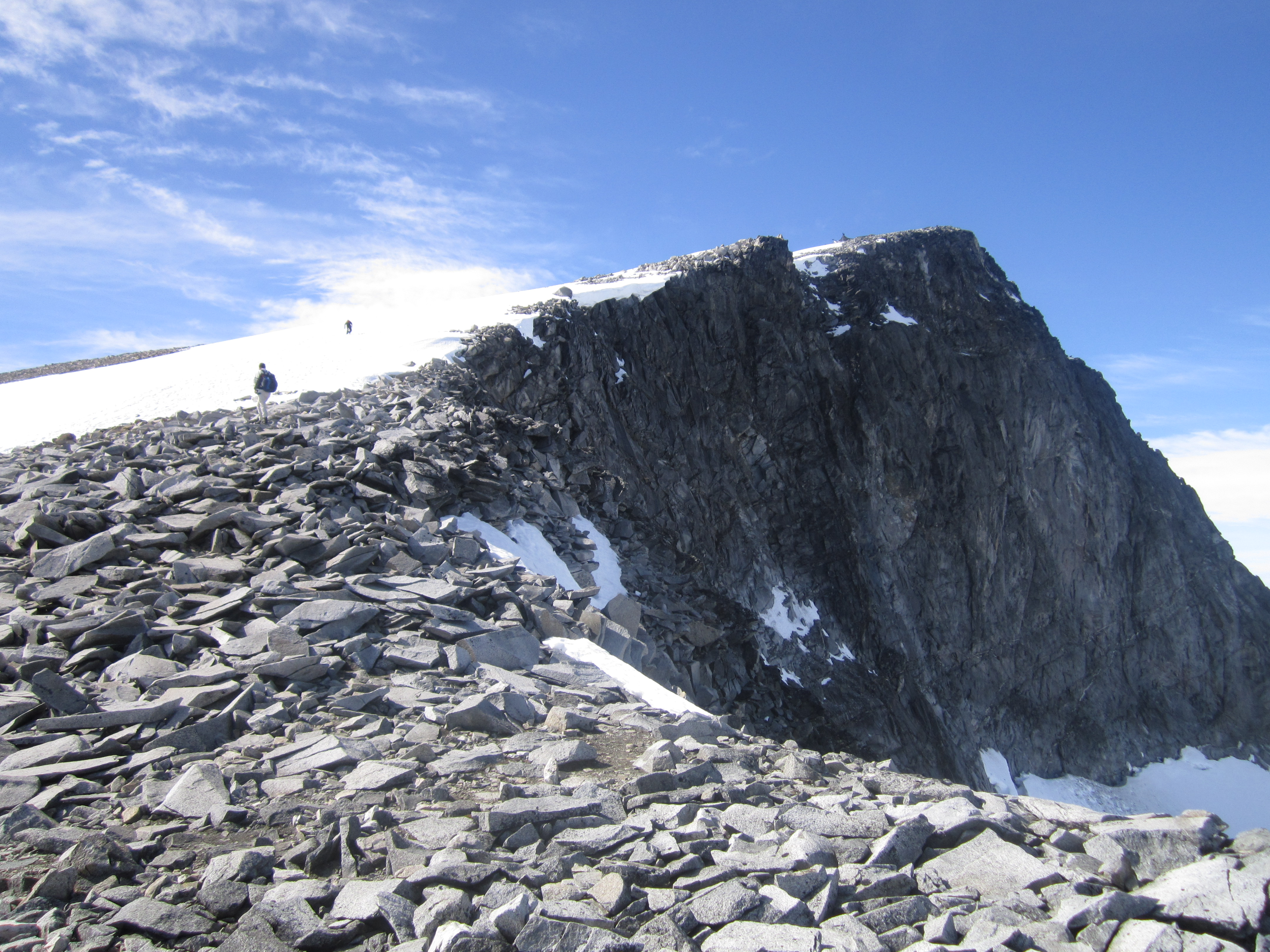
The upper portion of Galdhøpiggen

1. Mont Blanc, Western Alps - 2,812 kilometres (1,747 mi); elevation 4,810 metres (15,780 ft)
2. Elbrus volcano, Caucasus Mountains - 2,469.9 kilometres (1,534.7 mi); elevation 5,642 metres (18,510 ft)
3. Galdhøpiggen, Scandinavian Peninsula - 1,568.3 kilometres (974.5 mi); elevation 2,469 metres (8,100 ft)
4. Montanha do Pico volcano, Azores islands - 1,451.3 kilometres (901.8 mi); elevation 2,351 metres (7,713 ft)
5. Mount Etna volcano, Island of Sicily - 998.79 kilometres (620.62 mi); elevation 3,323 metres (10,902 ft)
6. Musala, Balkan Peninsula - 810 kilometres (500 mi); elevation 2,925 metres (9,596 ft)
7. Kebnekaise, Scandinavian Peninsula - 756.7 kilometres (470.2 mi); elevation 2,097 metres (6,880 ft)
8. Hvannadalshnúkur, Öræfajökull volcano Iceland - 714.9 kilometres (444.2 mi); elevation 2,110 metres (6,920 ft)
9. Beerenberg volcano, Jan Mayen island - 596.4 kilometres (370.6 mi); elevation 2,277 metres (7,470 ft)
10. Mulhacén, Iberian Peninsula - 526.3 kilometres (327.0 mi); elevation 3,479 metres (11,414 ft)

== List by topographic isolation of major peaks with elevation of more than 1,500m ==
1. Mont Blanc, Alps - 2,812 kilometres (1,747 mi); elevation 4,810 metres (15,780 ft)
2. Elbrus volcano, Greater Caucasus - 2,469.9 kilometres (1,534.7 mi); elevation 5,642 metres (18,510 ft)
3. Mount Narodnaya, Prepolar Ural Mountains - 1,835.4 kilometres (1,140.5 mi); elevation 1,894 metres (6,214 ft)
4. Galdhøpiggen, Scandinavian Peninsula - 1,568.3 kilometres (974.5 mi); elevation 2,469 metres (8,100 ft)
5. Montanha do Pico volcano, Azores islands - 1,451.3 kilometres (901.8 mi); elevation 2,351 metres (7,713 ft)
6. Mount Yamantau, Southern Ural Mountains - 1,150.7 kilometres (715.0 mi); elevation 1,640 metres (5,380 ft)
7. Mount Kruzenshtern, Novaya Zemlya archipelago - 1,077.4 kilometres (669.5 mi); elevation 1,547 metres (5,075 ft)
8. Mount Etna volcano, Island of Sicily - 998.79 kilometres (620.62 mi); elevation 3,323 metres (10,902 ft)
9. Musala, Southeast Europe - 810 kilometres (500 mi); elevation 2,925 metres (9,596 ft)
10. Kebnekaise, Scandinavian Peninsula - 756.7 kilometres (470.2 mi); elevation 2,097 metres (6,880 ft)

== See also ==
- List of European ultra-prominent peaks
- List of the highest European ultra-prominent peaks
- Southernmost glacial mass in Europe
