= Mancho =

Mancho (Манчо)
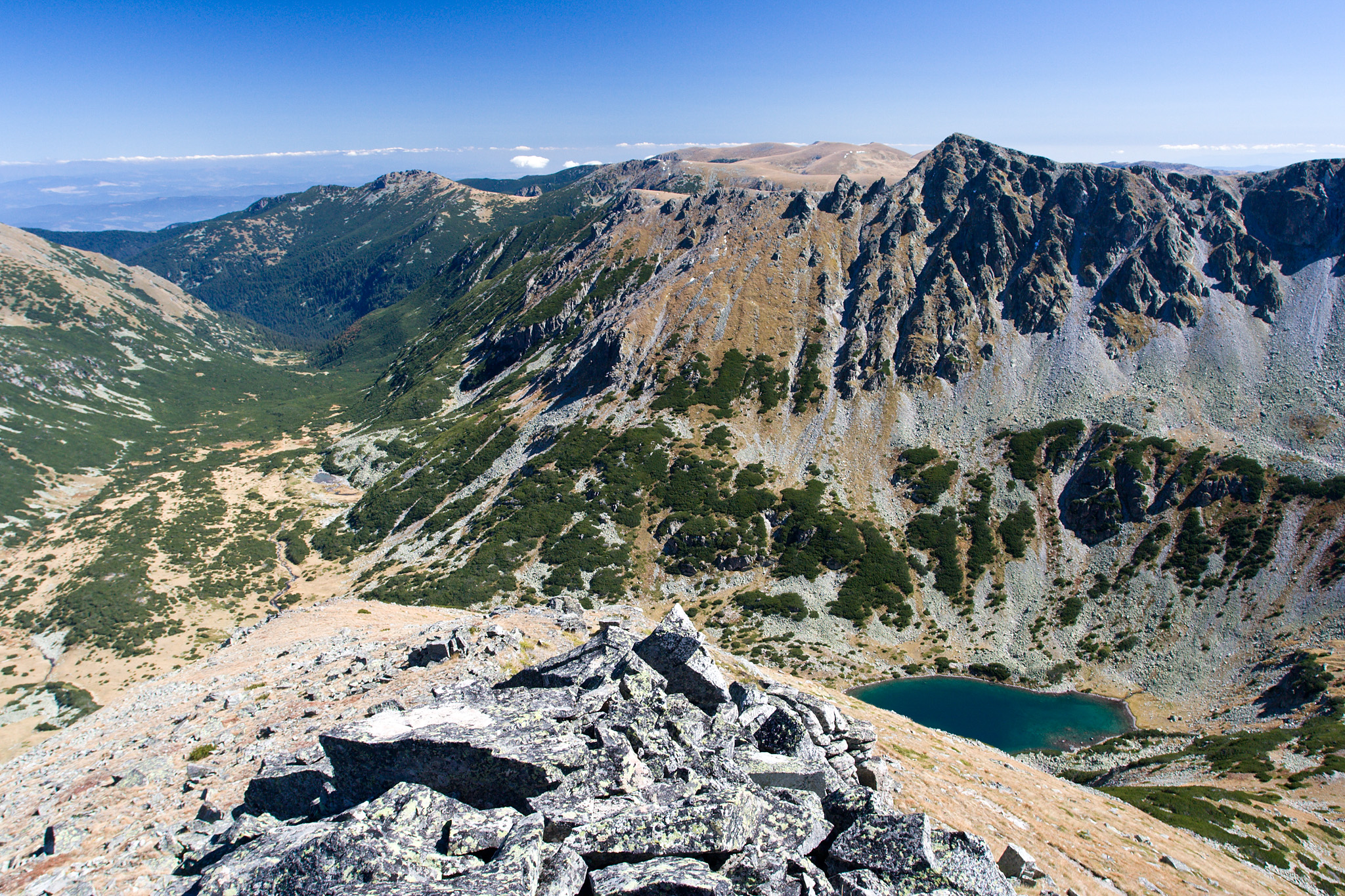
- Mancho

Highest point
- Elevation: 2,771 m (9,091 ft)
- Coordinates: 42°9′23″N 23°36′10″E

Geography
- Location: Bulgaria
- Parent range: Rila Mountains

Mancho (Bulgarian: Манчо) is a summit in the eastern part of the Rila Mountain in southwestern Bulgaria reaching height of 2,771 m. It rises northeast of Marishki Chal (2,765 m). Mancho is a granite bifurcated peak, with the higher section located to the southwest and the lower one to the northeast. Its western, northern and eastern slopes are steep and difficult to access. The northwestern slope forms the walls of the Maritsa cirque which contains the Marichini Lakes. On its slopes grows the endangered plant Taraxacum bithynicum.
