= Marichini Lakes =

Glacial lakes in Bulgaria

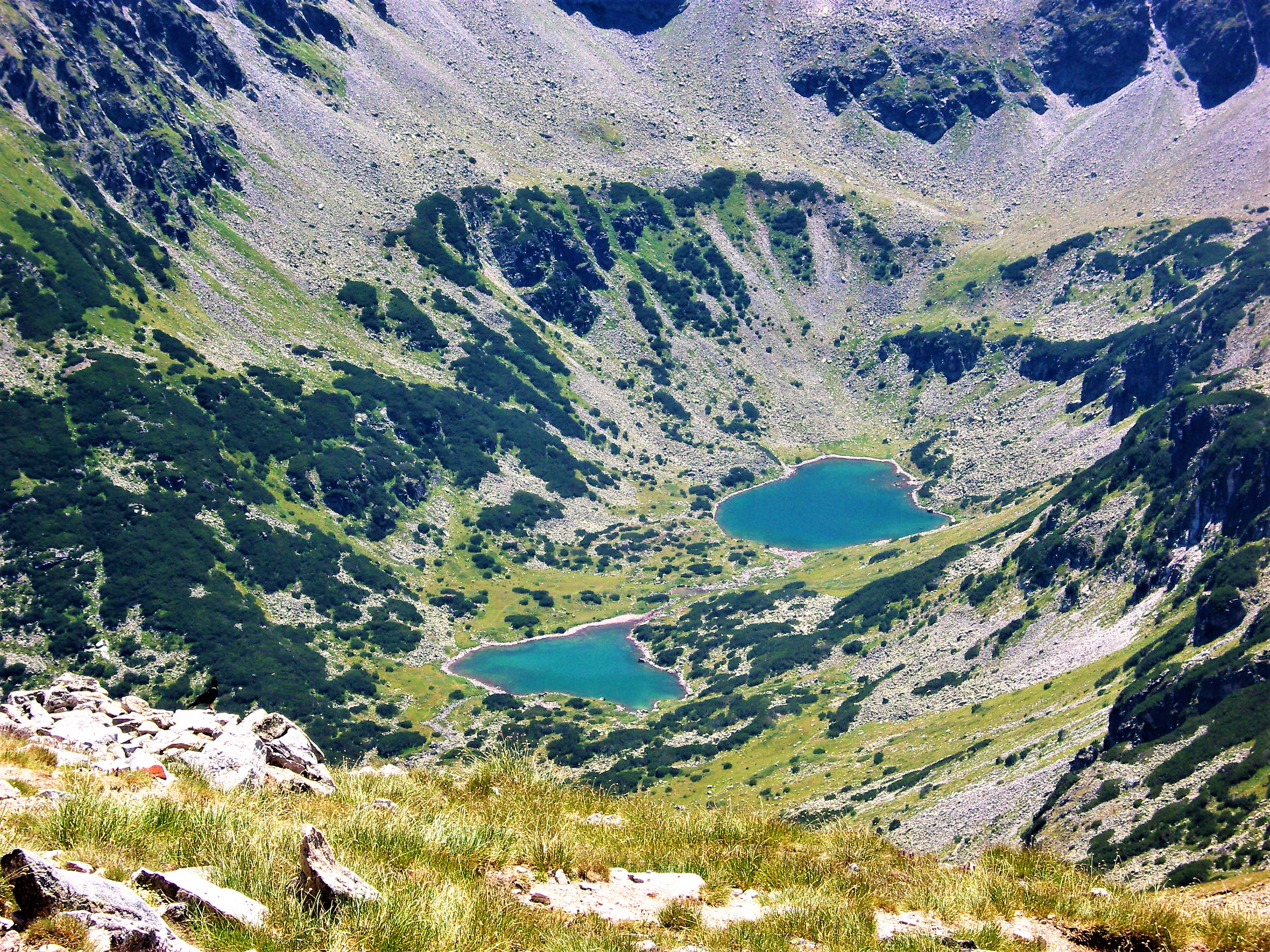

- Location within Bulgaria
- Coordinates: 42°9′41″N 23°35′46″E
- Basin countries: Bulgaria
- Surface area: 3,300 m^{2} (36,000 sq ft)
- Max. depth: 11 m (36 ft)
- Surface elevation: 2,301 m (7,549 ft) to 2,508 m (8,228 ft)

Marichini Lakes (Bulgarian: Маричини езера) are a group of four glacial lakes situated in the eastern part of Rila mountain range of southwestern Bulgaria at an altitude between 2,301 m and 2,508 m. They are situated in the Marichin cirque between the summits of Blizantsite (2,779 m) to the west, Marishki Chal (2,765 m) to the south and Mancho (2,771 m) to the southeast. They are the source of the Tiha Maritsa, one of the two main stems of one of the longest rivers in the Balkans, the Maritsa. Two of the lakes are permanent; the other two dry up in summer.

The first lake is the highest, situated at an altitude of 2,508 m in a small cirque in the northern foothills of Marishki Chal. It is of variable area and dries up in summer. The second lake is located at 300 m to the northeast of the first one at an altitude of 2,374 m. It is the largest and deepest in the group with an area of 2.2 ha, length of 240 m, width of 140 m and depth of 11 m. In its south corner flows a small stream from the first lake and from its north corner flows the Tiha Maritsa. The third lake is located at 130 m to the north of the second at an altitude of 2,367 m. Its shape is roughly triangular; it has an area of 1.1 ha and depth of 5 m. The Tiha Maritsa flows in from the south and flows out to the north. The fourth lake is situated at 800 m from the third at an altitude of 2,301 m; it dries up in summer.

The area around the lakes falls in the alpine zone of the mountain range with glacial landforms and alpine climate. The vegetation consists mainly of scrubs and meadows, with smaller area of coniferous forests; there are rare and endemic species, including significant populations of Rila primrose (Primula deorum) which is restricted to Rila. The area around the lakes is inhabited by chamois and brown bears. To protect the habitats and the wildlife, the Marichini Lakes Reserve was declared in 1951 with a total area of 1,500 ha. In 1992, it was absorbed in the larger Central Rila Reserve.
