= Deno (Rila) =

Deno (Дено)
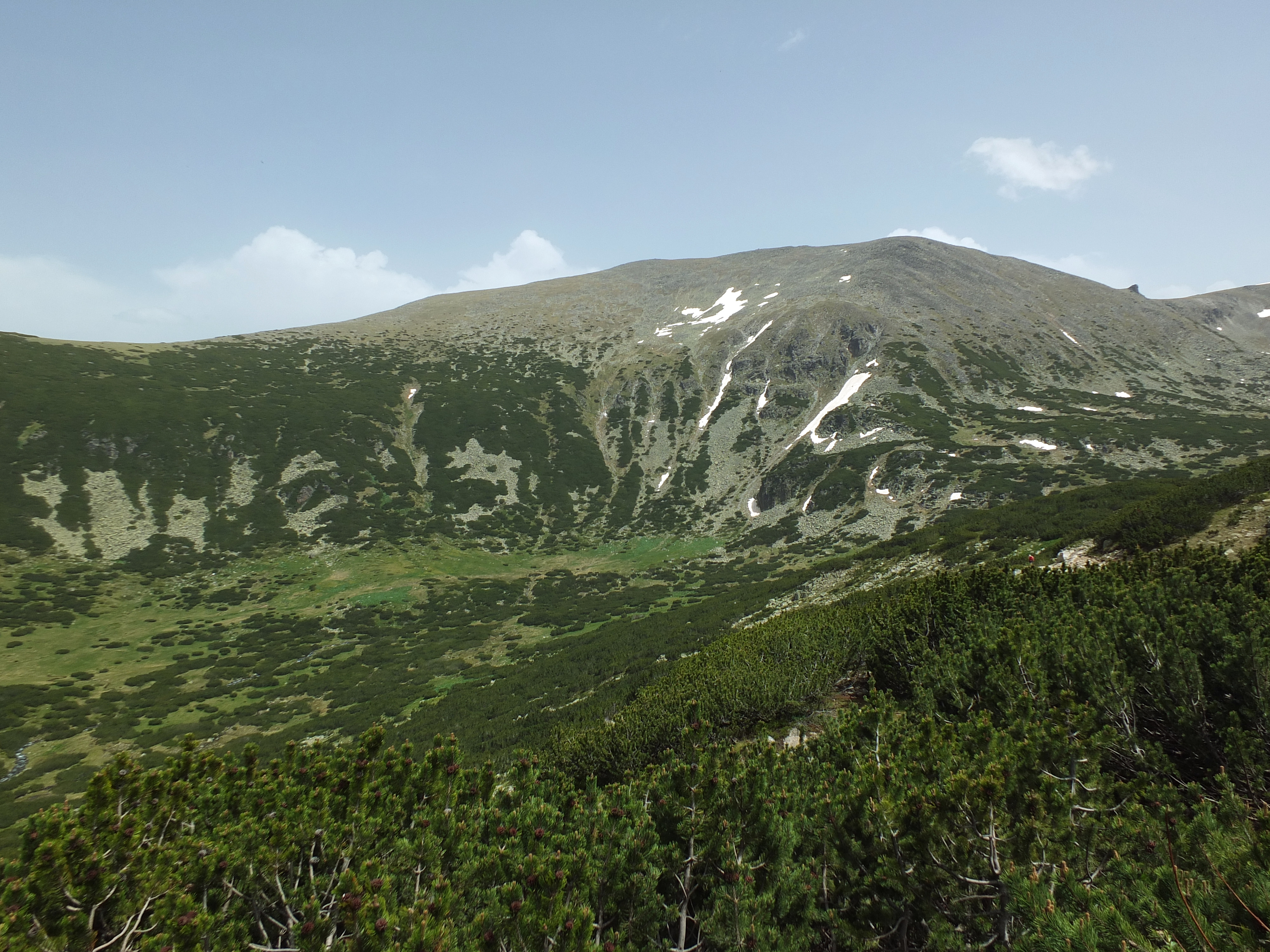
- Deno

Highest point
- Elevation: 2,790 m (9,150 ft)
- Prominence: 93 m (305 ft)
- Coordinates: 42°11′48″N 23°36′12″E

Geography
- Location: Bulgaria
- Parent range: Rila Mountains

Deno (Bulgarian: Дено) is a peak in the eastern part of the Rila Mountain in southwestern Bulgaria. It is 2,790 m high and is the fifth highest summit in the mountain range behind Musala (2,925 m), Malka Musala (2,902 m), Irechek (2,852 m) and Bezimennia Vrah (2,792 m). It is built up of gneiss and granite–gneiss. The northern slope is steep, while the southern one is oblique and covered in grass. A deep gully descends along the north-western slopes that holds perennial firn. To the west lies the valley of the Musalenska Bistritsa, a tributary of Bulgaria's longest river, the Iskar and Musala refuge; to the north-east is the Saragyol Cirque that contains three glacial lakes. Deno is located in the vicinity of the ski runs of Borovets and the cabin lift to Yastrebots refuge, which make it easily accessible. In winter some of the tourist tracks are exposed to avalanches.
