= Ovcharets =

Bulgarian mountain peak

Ovcharets (Овчарец)

Highest point
- Elevation: 2,768 m (9,081 ft)
- Coordinates: 42°8′34.8″N 23°35′42″E

Geography
- Location: Bulgaria
- Parent range: Rila Mountains

Ovcharets (Bulgarian: Овчарец) is a summit in eastern Rila mountain range in southwestern Bulgaria reaching height of 2,768 m. It is located in Rila National Park. Ovcharets is built up of granite.

The peak lies on the Musala ridge, in the vicinity of a few other peaks of almost identical height. Ovcharets is south of the summit of Marishki Chal (2,765 m), and next to it, on a short ridge to the east, is the summit of Pesokliva Vapa (2,769 m). The southern slope of Ovcharets is extended and reaches as far as the Dzanka saddle.

On the crest of Ovcharets there are well-defined rock humps. The crest of the summit and its western slopes are covered with stone debris and weathered rocks. The western wall descends almost vertically to the valley of the river Beli Iskar. The eastern slope is grassy and steep, covered with common juniper (Juniperus communis).
