= Malka Musala =

Mountain peak in Southwest Bulgaria

Malka Musala (Малка Мусала)
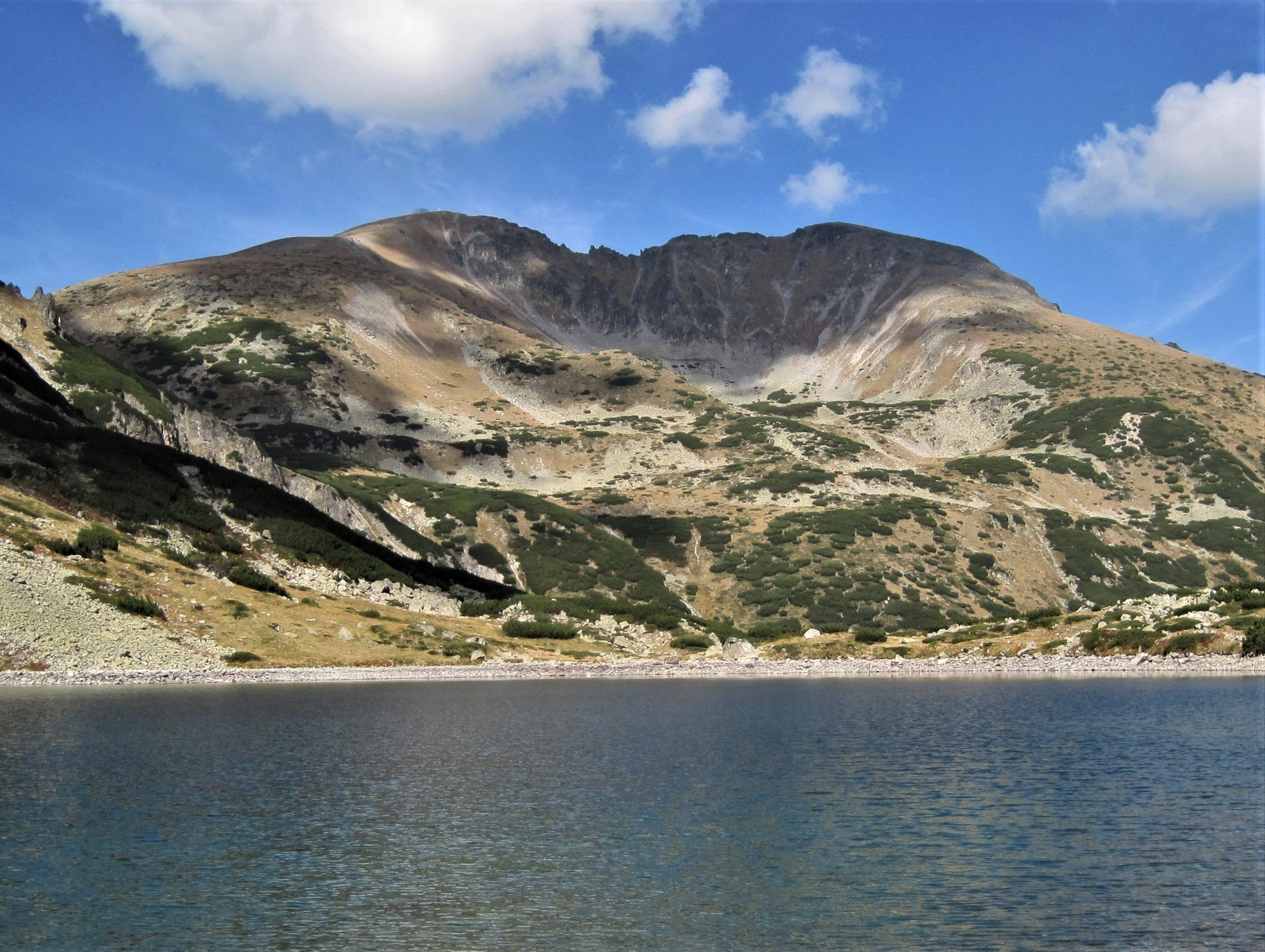
- Musala (left) and Malka Musala (right)

Highest point
- Elevation: 2,902 m (9,521 ft)
- Coordinates: 42°11′9.11″N 23°38′19.07″E

Geography
- Location: Bulgaria
- Parent range: Rila Mountains

Malka Musala (Bulgarian: Малка Мусала, meaning Lesser Musala) is a summit in the eastern part of the Rila Mountain in southwestern Bulgaria. With an altitude of 2,902 m, it is the second highest peak in Rila after Musala (2,925 m), fourth in Bulgaria behind Vihren (2,914 m) and Kutelo (2,908 m) in the Pirin Mountain, and seventh in the Balkan Peninsula.

The summit is situated to the north-east of Musala, separated by a rocky ridge. The ridge extends in a north-eastern direction to the summits of Irechek (2,852 m) and Deno (2,790 m). To the north-west is located the Musala Cirque and the highest of the seven Musala Lakes. To the south and the east the slopes of Malka Musala descend to the deep valley of the Maritsa River, forming two cirques. The cirque between Malka Musala and Musala is waterless, the one between Malka Musala and Irechek nestles a glacial lake that gives the source of a stream that flows to the Maritsa.

Between 1950 and 1989, Malka Musala was officially named Dimitov, after the Bulgarian communist leader Georgi Dimitrov.
