= Irechek (peak) =

Mountain peak in Bulgaria

Irechek (Иречек)
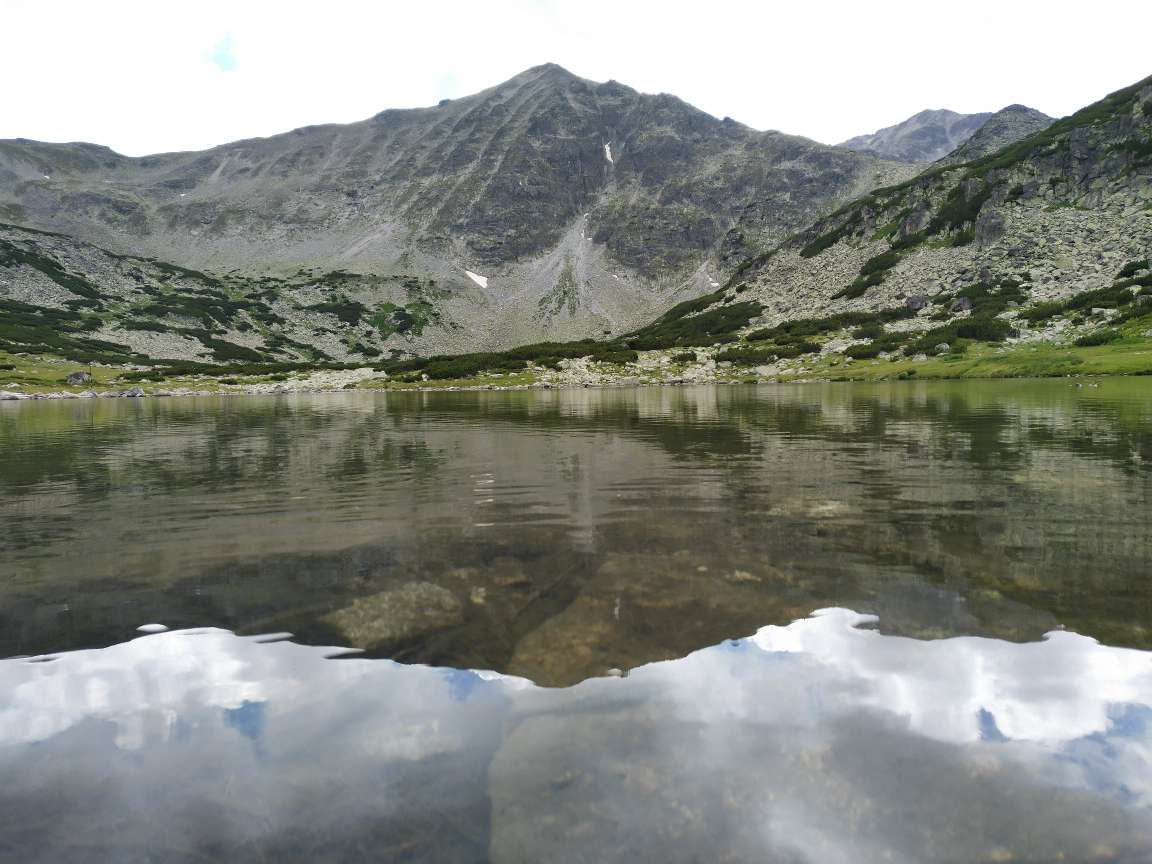
- Irechek seen from Musala Lakes

Highest point
- Elevation: 2,852 m (9,357 ft)
- Coordinates: 42°11′9.7″N 23°35′31.6″E

Geography
- Location: Bulgaria
- Parent range: Rila Mountains

Irechek (Bulgarian: Иречек) is a summit in the eastern part of the Rila Mountain in southwestern Bulgaria. Its altitude is 2,852 m, making it the third highest peak in Rila after Musala (2,925 m) and Malka Musala (2,902 m). It is situated in the vicinity of the summits of Musala and Deno (2,790 m) in the eastern part of the Musala Cirque which contains the Musala Lakes. It is named after the Czech historian Konstantin Jireček, who researched extensively Bulgarian history and following the reestablishment of the Bulgarian state in 1878 was employed by the Bulgarian government.
