= Musala =

Highest mountain in Bulgaria

- Мусала
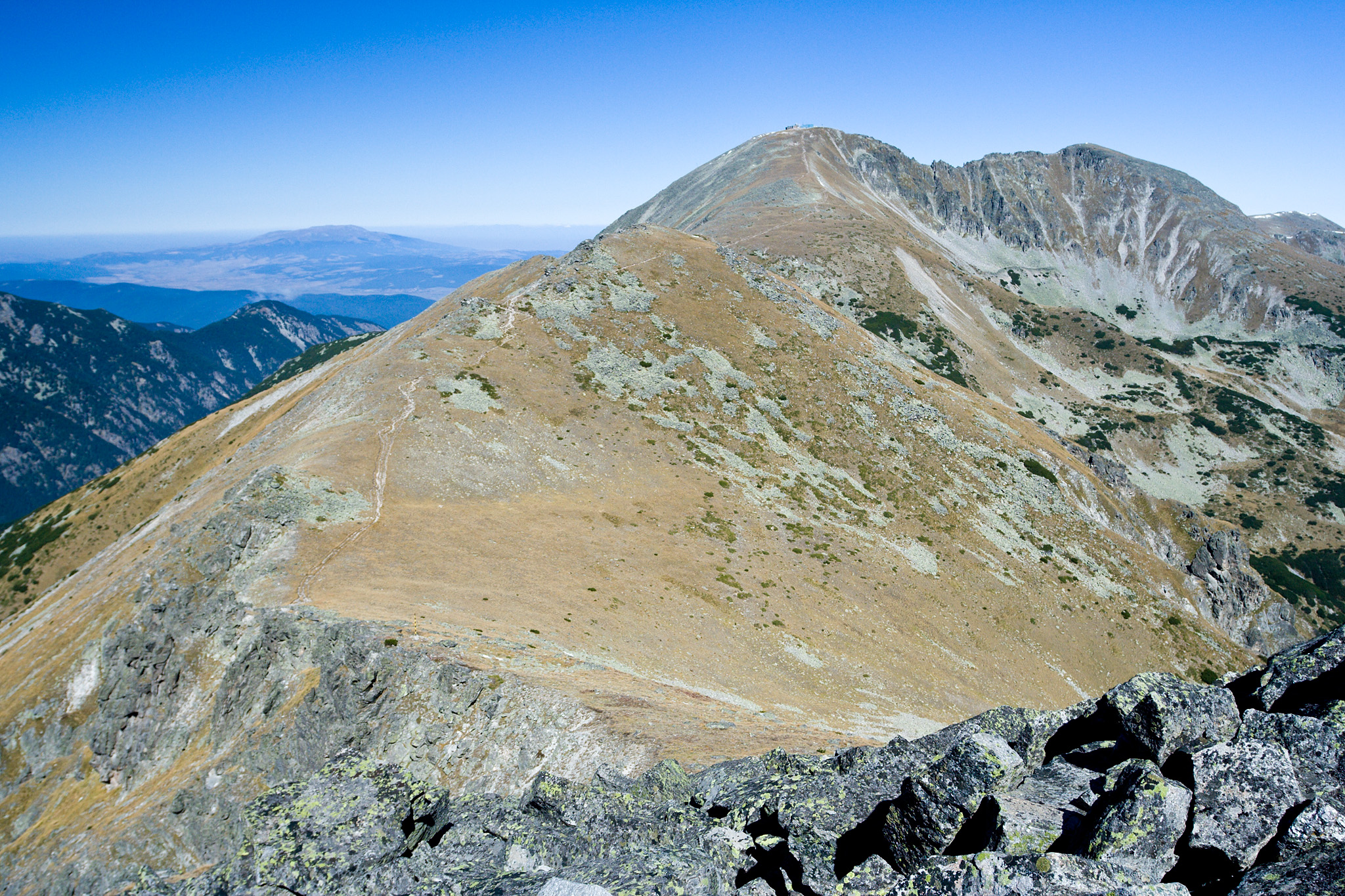
- Musala seen from the south

Highest point
- Elevation: 2,925.4 m (9,598 ft)
- Prominence: 2,473 m (8,114 ft)
- Isolation: 810.8 km (503.8 mi) to Uyluk Tepesi
- Listing: Country high point Ultra
- Coordinates: 42°10′47″N 23°35′12″E

Geography
- Location within Bulgaria
- Location: Sofia Region, Bulgaria
- Parent range: Rila

Climbing
- Easiest route: Gondola lift from Borovets, then hike

Musala (Bulgarian: Мусала [mosɐˈɫa]; from Arabic through Ottoman Turkish: from Musalla, "near God" or "place for prayer") is the highest peak in the Rila Mountains, as well as in Bulgaria and the entire Balkan Peninsula, standing at 2,925.42 metres (9,597.8 ft).

With a topographic prominence of 2,473 metres (8,114 ft), Musala is also the 6th highest peak by topographic prominence in mainland Europe. It is also the 3rd most topographically isolated major peak in Continental Europe.

Musala is situated within the Rila National Park, which is noted for its rich flora, including species such as Macedonian Pine and Bulgarian Fir in the forests on its middle slopes, and fauna; it is one of the easiest places in Europe to see the wallcreeper. All major mountain ranges of Bulgaria can be seen from the top; these include Vitosha to the northwest, Sredna Gora towards the northeast, the Balkan Mountains along most of the northern horizon behind Vitosha and Sredna Gora, the Rhodope Mountains to the southeast, Pirin to the south, Osogovo and Ruy Mountain to the west, and of course, the rest of Rila.

A cosmic ray station was built on the peak in 1960 with cooperation from the Hungarian Academy of Science. The station conducted scientific experiments using a muon telescope. The station was destroyed by an electrical fire on October 29, 1983.

With an average annual temperature of -2.2 °C, Musala is the coldest place in Bulgaria and the entire Balkan Peninsula. Temperatures stay below 0 °C for about 8 months each year. Due to this, about 45% of the annual precipitation on Musala is snow, and snow cover lasts for about 200 days (more than six months). Three of the main rivers of Bulgaria, the Iskar, Maritsa and Mesta have their sources near Musala.

The next highest peaks in the vicinity of Musala are Malka (Little) Musala (2,902 metres (9,521 ft)) and Irechek (2,852 metres (9,357 ft)).

== Etymology ==
The name "Musala" is stated to have derived from the Ottoman Turkish phrase "Mus Allah" ("near God" / "place for prayer"), while other accounts suggest it originates from Mashallah, a name reportedly given in the 15th century. According to local guidebooks and traditions, the peak was historically associated with the Bulgars under names such as TangRa or TengriRa, linked to Tengri, the supreme deity in ancient Turkic religion. This reflects early accounts of nomadic Turkic traditions wherein prominent summits were revered in connection with Tengri.

== Climate ==
Musala has an alpine climate with long, cold winters and short, cool summers. Usually, through winter, the temperatures do not exceed the freezing point for months. Snow cover lasts for about 8–9 months. Through the summer, temperatures rarely go above 14-15C. The summer season only lasts for 2 months, and snowfalls are possible. For the period 1931–2013, the highest recorded temperature was 20.0 °C (68.0 °F), and the lowest - −31.2 °C (−24.2 °F). The average annual temperature is −2.5 °C (27.5 °F), which makes the peak the coldest place in Bulgaria.

Climate data for Musala Peak (2000–2013)
Month	Jan	Feb	Mar	Apr	May	Jun	Jul	Aug	Sep	Oct	Nov	Dec	Year
Record high °C (°F)	7.0 (44.6)	8.0 (46.4)	12.1 (53.8)	13.7 (56.7)	12.6 (54.7)	18.0 (64.4)	20.0 (68.0)	18.7 (65.7)	16.4 (61.5)	14.2 (57.6)	9.6 (49.3)	6.8 (44.2)	20.0 (68.0)
Mean daily maximum °C (°F)	−8.2 (17.2)	−7.6 (18.3)	−5.6 (21.9)	−1.2 (29.8)	2.7 (36.9)	7.1 (44.8)	10.1 (50.2)	10.2 (50.4)	6.3 (43.3)	2.2 (36.0)	−1.8 (28.8)	−6.1 (21.0)	0.7 (33.3)
Daily mean °C (°F)	−11.0 (12.2)	−10.6 (12.9)	−8.6 (16.5)	−4.1 (24.6)	−0.1 (31.8)	4.4 (39.9)	6.9 (44.4)	7.2 (45.0)	3.4 (38.1)	−0.6 (30.9)	−4.4 (24.1)	−8.6 (16.5)	−2.1 (28.2)
Mean daily minimum °C (°F)	−13.8 (7.2)	−13.6 (7.5)	−11.6 (11.1)	−7.0 (19.4)	−3.1 (26.4)	1.6 (34.9)	3.7 (38.7)	4.2 (39.6)	0.5 (32.9)	−3.1 (26.4)	−6.9 (19.6)	−11.0 (12.2)	−4.9 (23.2)
Record low °C (°F)	−30.6 (−23.1)	−29.8 (−21.6)	−26.8 (−16.2)	−20.6 (−5.1)	−15.6 (3.9)	−12 (10)	−8 (18)	−9.8 (14.4)	−14 (7)	−17.5 (0.5)	−27.4 (−17.3)	−31.2 (−24.2)	−31.2 (−24.2)
Average precipitation mm (inches)	126 (5.0)	110 (4.3)	130 (5.1)	128 (5.0)	119 (4.7)	105 (4.1)	80 (3.1)	56 (2.2)	47 (1.9)	72 (2.8)	88 (3.5)	115 (4.5)	1,176 (46.3)
Average rainy days	1	0	0	0	4	8	9	7	6	3	1	0	39
Average snowy days	13	14	17	18	14	5	2	1	4	8	13	15	124
Mean monthly sunshine hours	114	112	140	127	168	181	250	250	182	169	128	104	1,925
Source: Stringmeteo.com

Climate data for Musala Peak, 1991–2020 (elevation 2925m)
Month	Jan	Feb	Mar	Apr	May	Jun	Jul	Aug	Sep	Oct	Nov	Dec	Year
Record high °C (°F)	7.2 (45.0)	4.9 (40.8)	6.5 (43.7)	8.6 (47.5)	13.0 (55.4)	17.6 (63.7)	19.8 (67.6)	19.2 (66.6)	17.9 (64.2)	15.0 (59.0)	11.0 (51.8)	10.2 (50.4)	19.8 (67.6)
Mean daily maximum °C (°F)	−6.7 (19.9)	−7.0 (19.4)	−5.1 (22.8)	−1.9 (28.6)	2.4 (36.3)	6.6 (43.9)	9.3 (48.7)	9.7 (49.5)	5.9 (42.6)	2.7 (36.9)	−1.5 (29.3)	−5.3 (22.5)	0.8 (33.4)
Daily mean °C (°F)	−9.7 (14.5)	−10.0 (14.0)	−8.2 (17.2)	−4.8 (23.4)	−0.2 (31.6)	3.7 (38.7)	6.0 (42.8)	6.4 (43.5)	2.6 (36.7)	−0.3 (31.5)	−4.3 (24.3)	−8.1 (17.4)	−2.2 (28.0)
Mean daily minimum °C (°F)	−12.5 (9.5)	−12.9 (8.8)	−11.1 (12.0)	−7.4 (18.7)	−2.5 (27.5)	1.2 (34.2)	3.3 (37.9)	3.9 (39.0)	0.2 (32.4)	−2.7 (27.1)	−6.8 (19.8)	−10.8 (12.6)	−4.8 (23.3)
Record low °C (°F)	−27.5 (−17.5)	−31.6 (−24.9)	−26.8 (−16.2)	−22.5 (−8.5)	−13.5 (7.7)	−9.0 (15.8)	−6.1 (21.0)	−6.0 (21.2)	−11.9 (10.6)	−16.3 (2.7)	−23.2 (−9.8)	−24.9 (−12.8)	−31.6 (−24.9)
Average precipitation mm (inches)	75 (3.0)	74 (2.9)	95 (3.7)	98 (3.9)	88 (3.5)	80 (3.1)	72 (2.8)	55 (2.2)	48 (1.9)	40 (1.6)	40 (1.6)	68 (2.7)	833 (32.9)
Average precipitation days (≥ 1.0 mm)	11	11	13	13	13	12	10	7	7	7	8	11	123
Mean monthly sunshine hours	126	119	142	134	159	170	228	241	185	165	124	106	1,899
Source: NOAA

== Namesakes ==
Musala Glacier on Greenwich Island in the South Shetland Islands, Antarctica is named after Musala Peak.

== Gallery ==
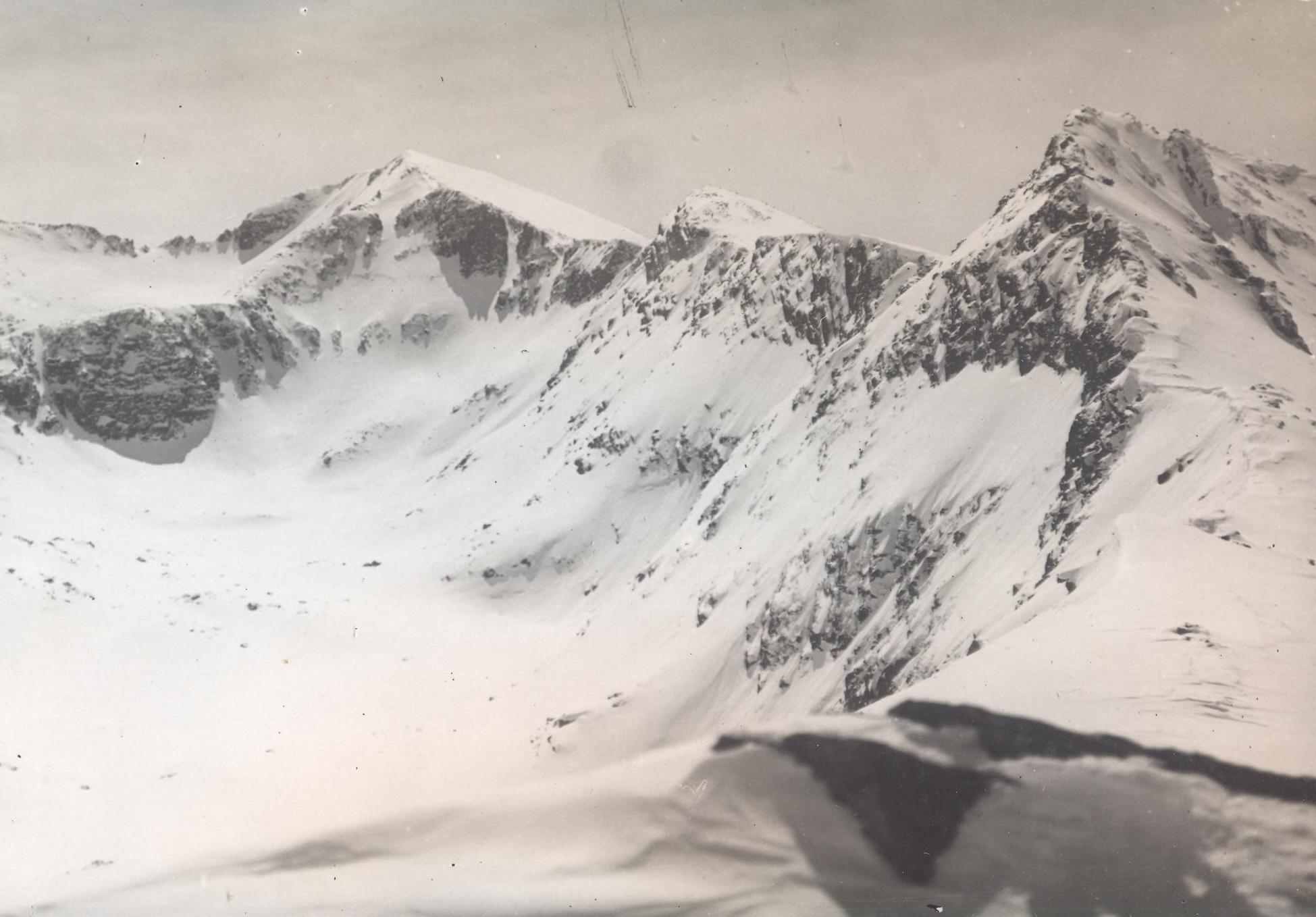

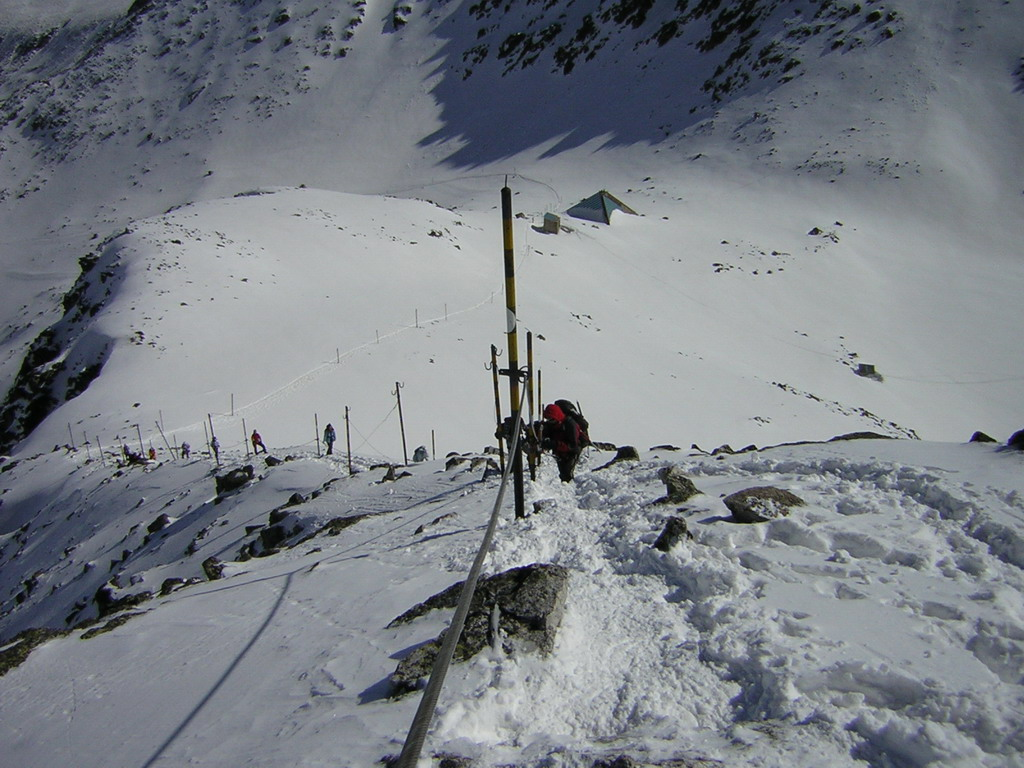
Hikers near the summit of Musala. The pyramid in the background is the Everest shelter

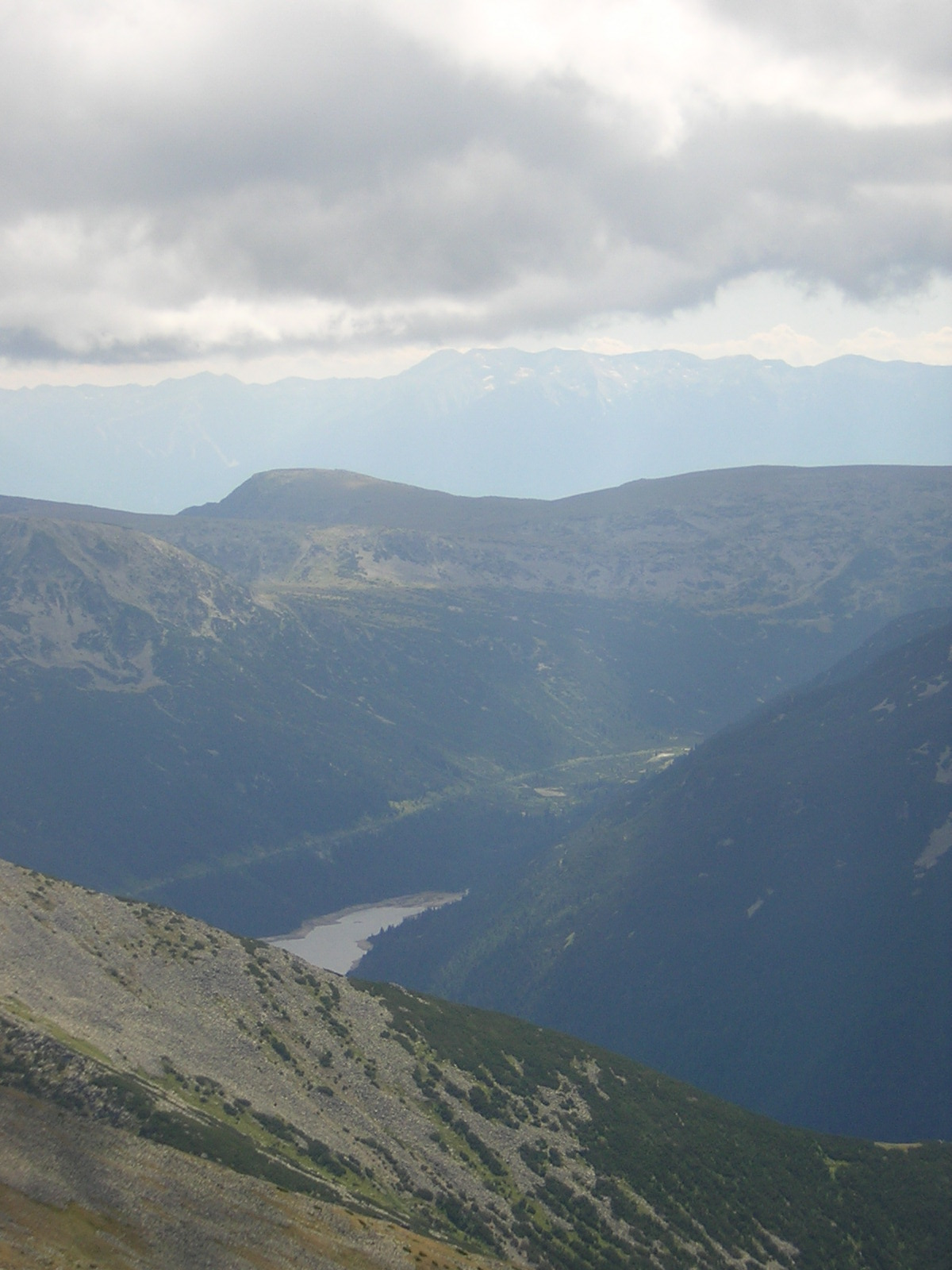
The Pirin Mountains can be seen from Musala

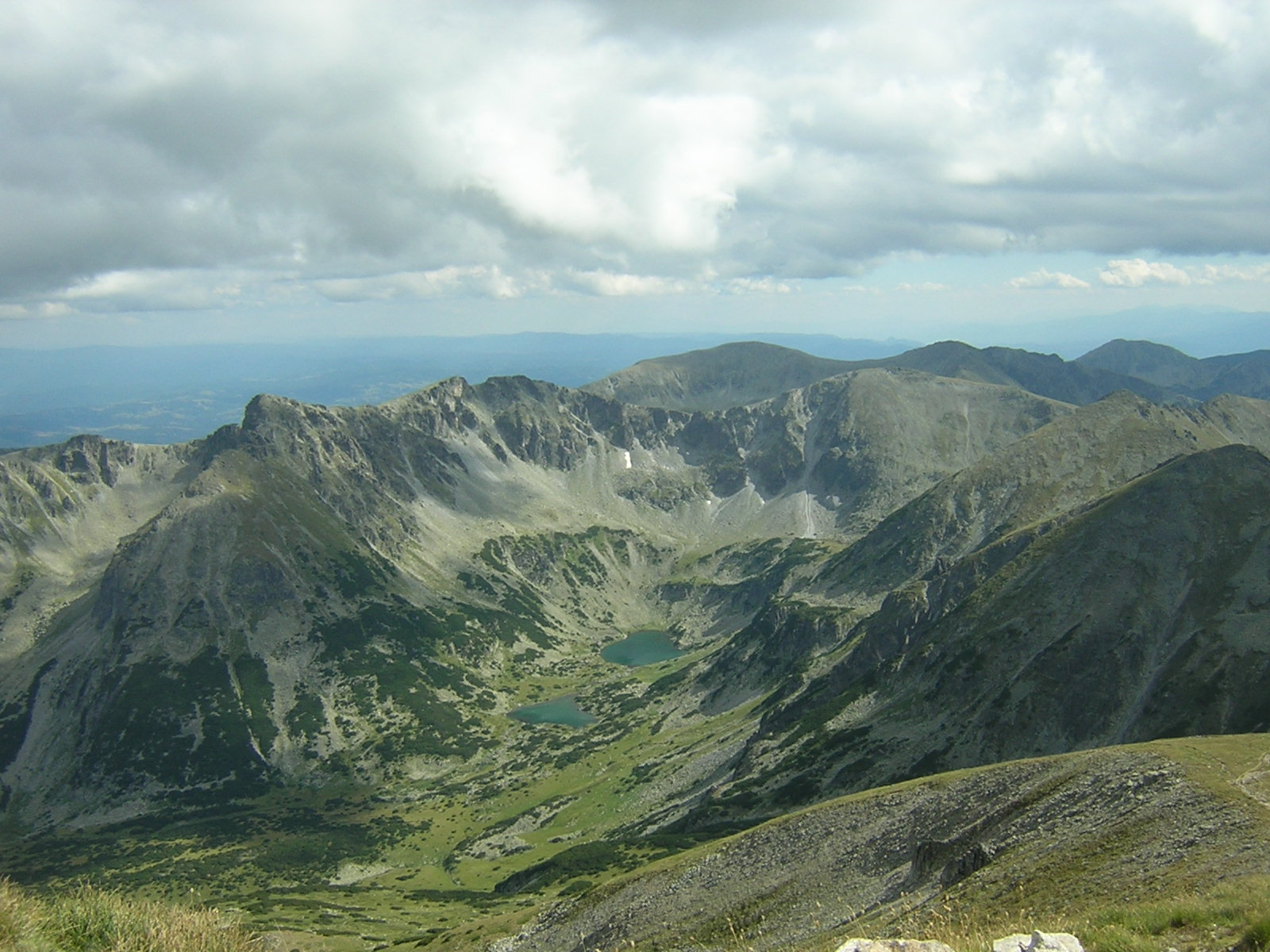
The origin of the Maritsa River seen from Musala

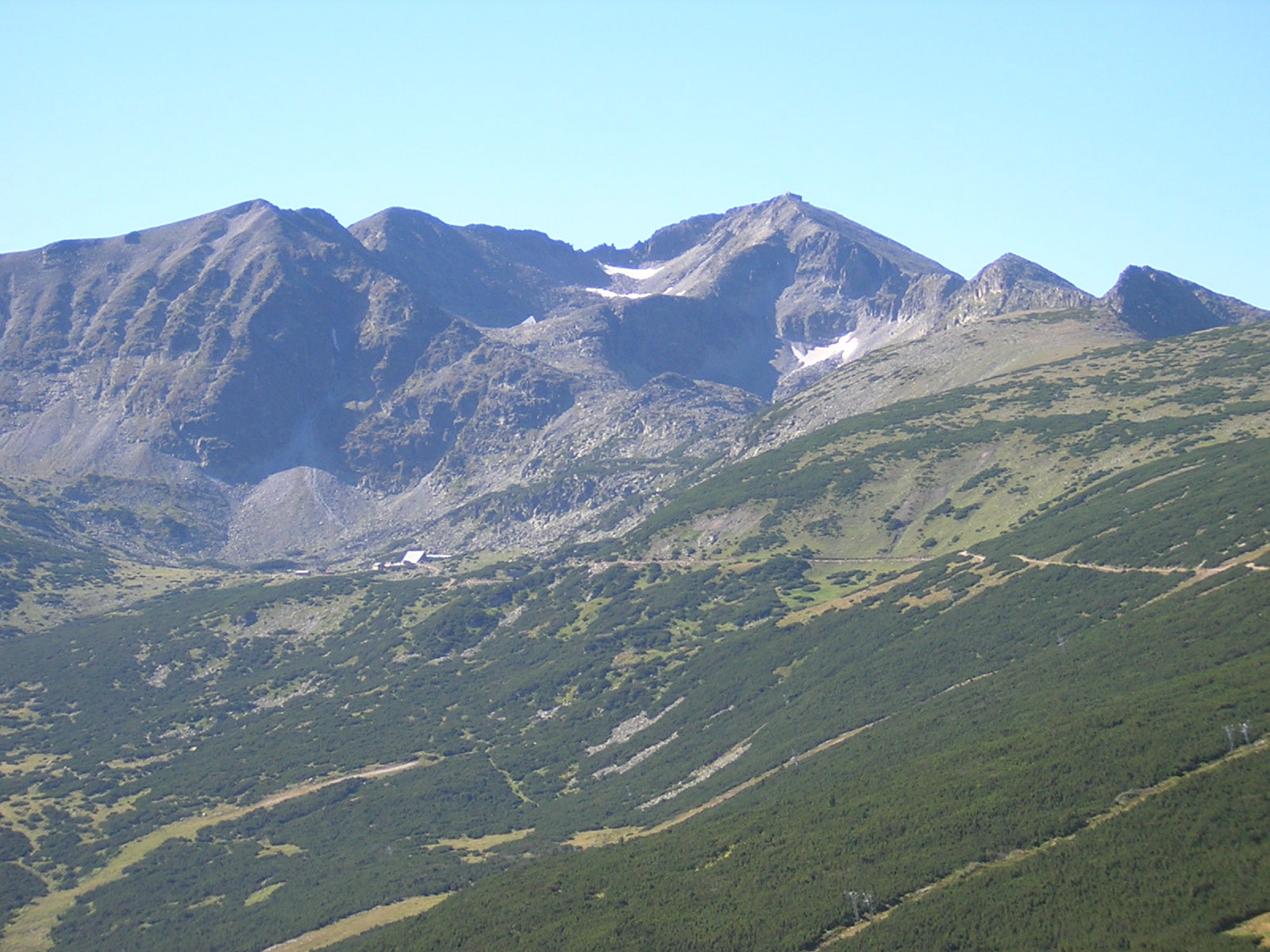
Musala as seen from Yastrebets. The chalet Musala and the Everest shelter can be seen as well.

== See also ==
- Rila
- Malyovitsa
- Rila National Park
- List of mountains in Bulgaria
- Geography of Bulgaria
- List of mountains of the Balkans
- List of European ultra-prominent peaks
- List of the highest European ultra-prominent peaks
- Most isolated major summits of Europe
- List of mountain ranges
- List of World Heritage Sites in Bulgaria
