= Katina, Bulgaria =

Katina
- Village
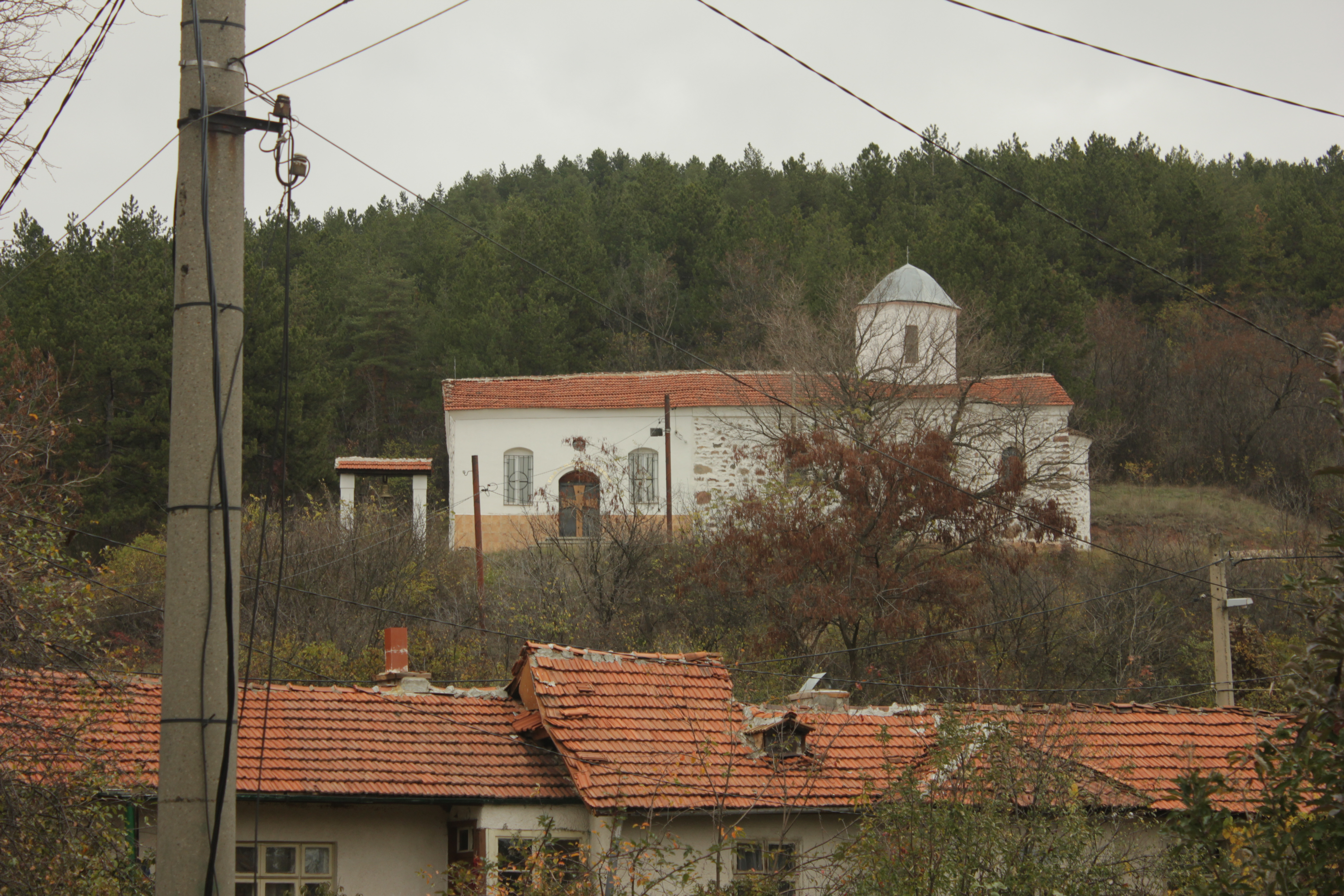

- Location within Bulgaria
- Coordinates: 42°50′36″N 23°19′10″E
- Country: Bulgaria
- Province: Sofia City
- Municipality: Stolichna Municipality
- Elevation: 606 m (1,988 ft)

Population (2024)
  - Total: 1,463
- Time zone: UTC+2 (EET)
  - Summer (DST): UTC+3 (EEST)
- Postal code: 1276

Katina (Bulgarian: Кътина) is a village in Novi Iskar district of the Bulgarian capital Sofia, located some 21 km north of the city center. As of 2024 it has 1,463 inhabitants.

== Geography ==
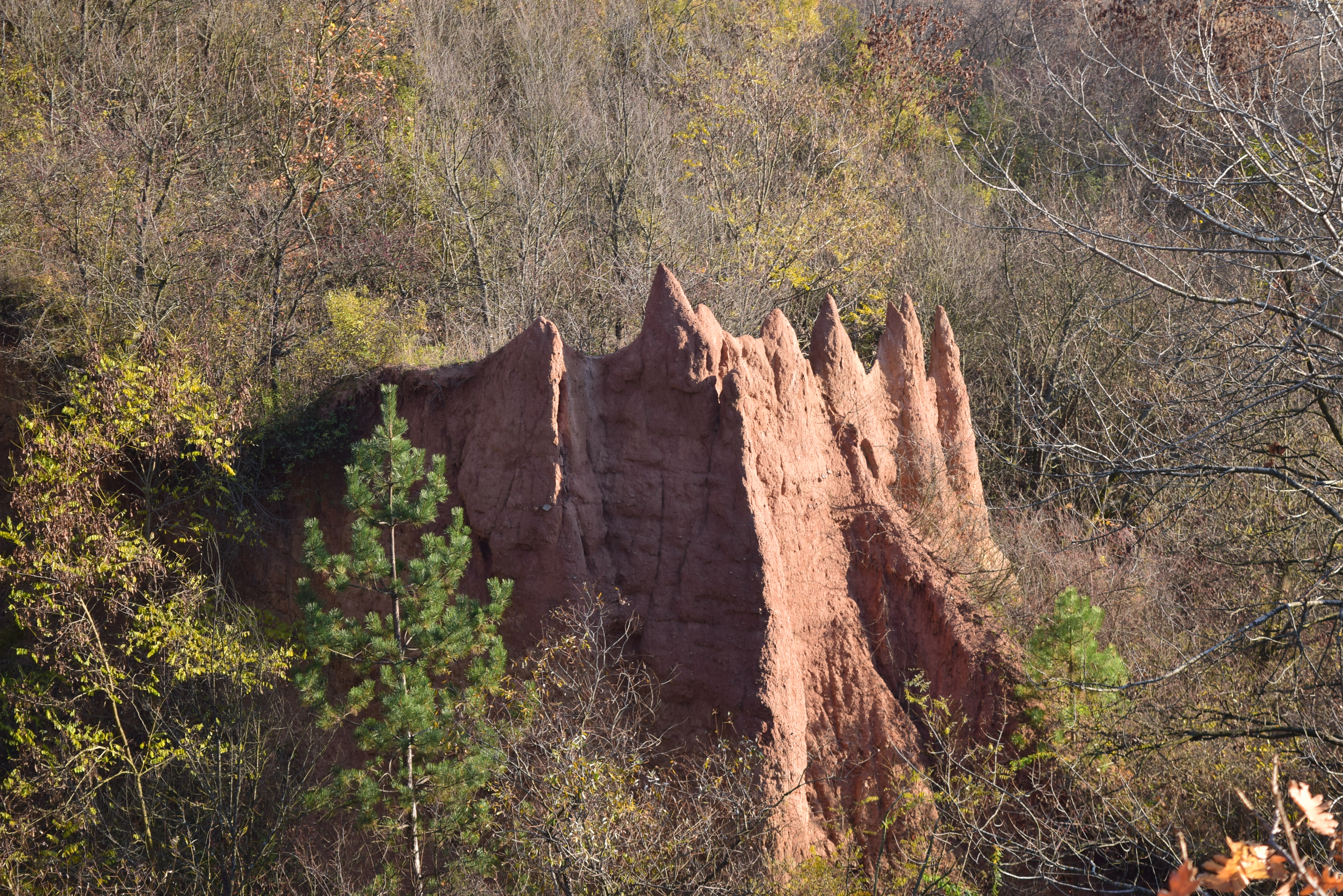
Katina Earth Pyramids

The village is situated at an altitude of 606 m on the southern slopes of the Balkan Mountains facing the northern part of the Sofia Valley. A small stream called the Katinska reka runs through the village and flows into the river Iskar, shortly before the latter enters the Iskar Gorge. Katina Earth Pyramids are situated near the eastern outskirts of the settlement. Katina falls within the continental climatic zone. The soils are cinnamon forest.

Administratively, Katina is part of the Novi Iskar district of Stolichna Municipality in the northwestern part of the Sofia City Province. It has a territory of 20.527 km^{2}. The closest settlements are the Kurilo neighbourhood of the town of Novi Iskar to the east, and the villages of Dobroslavtsi to the southwest, and Balsha to the west.

Katina is connected to the national transport network by a road that branches off the second class II-16 road Rebarkovo–Svoge–Novi Iskar. The village is served by a bus line of the Sofia Public Transport.

== History and culture ==
The village was first mentioned in 1420. The school of Katina was established in 1880. The Church of the Holy Saviour was constructed in 1880 and possesses valuable frescoes and icons. The local cultural center, known in Bulgarian as a chitalishte, was founded in 1929 and is named Prosveta, meaning enlightenment.
