= Lokorsko =

- Village
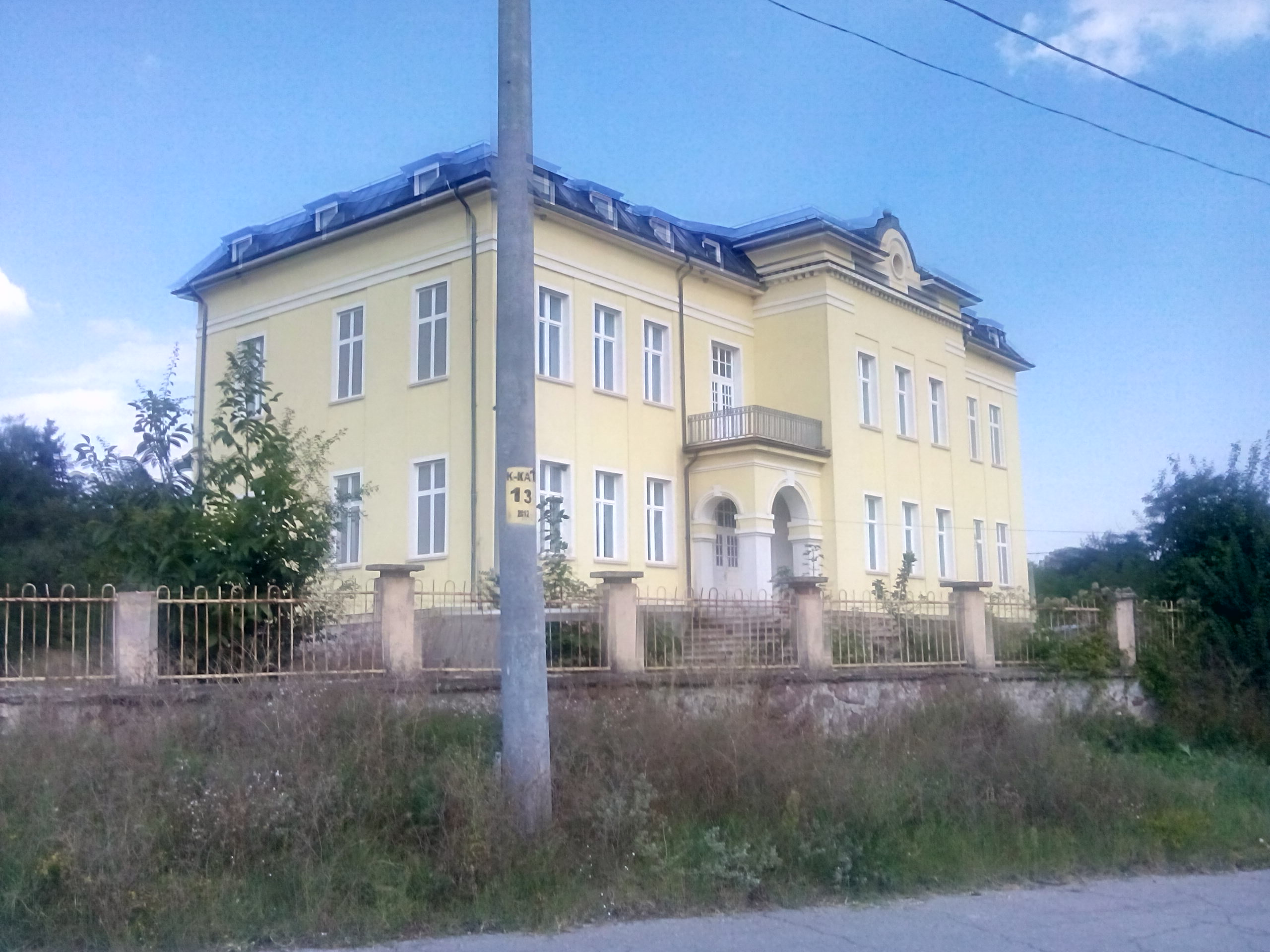
- The school of Lokorsko

- Location within Bulgaria
- Coordinates: 42°47′0″N 23°27′0″E
- Country: Bulgaria
- Province: Sofia City
- Municipality: Stolichna Municipality
- Elevation: 589 m (1,932 ft)

Population (2024)
  - Total: 753
- Time zone: UTC+2 (EET)
  - Summer (DST): UTC+3 (EEST)
- Postal code: 1513

Lokorsko (Bulgarian: Локорско) is a village in Novi Iskar district of the Bulgarian capital Sofia, located some 16 km north of the city center. As of 2024 it has 753 inhabitants.

== Geography ==
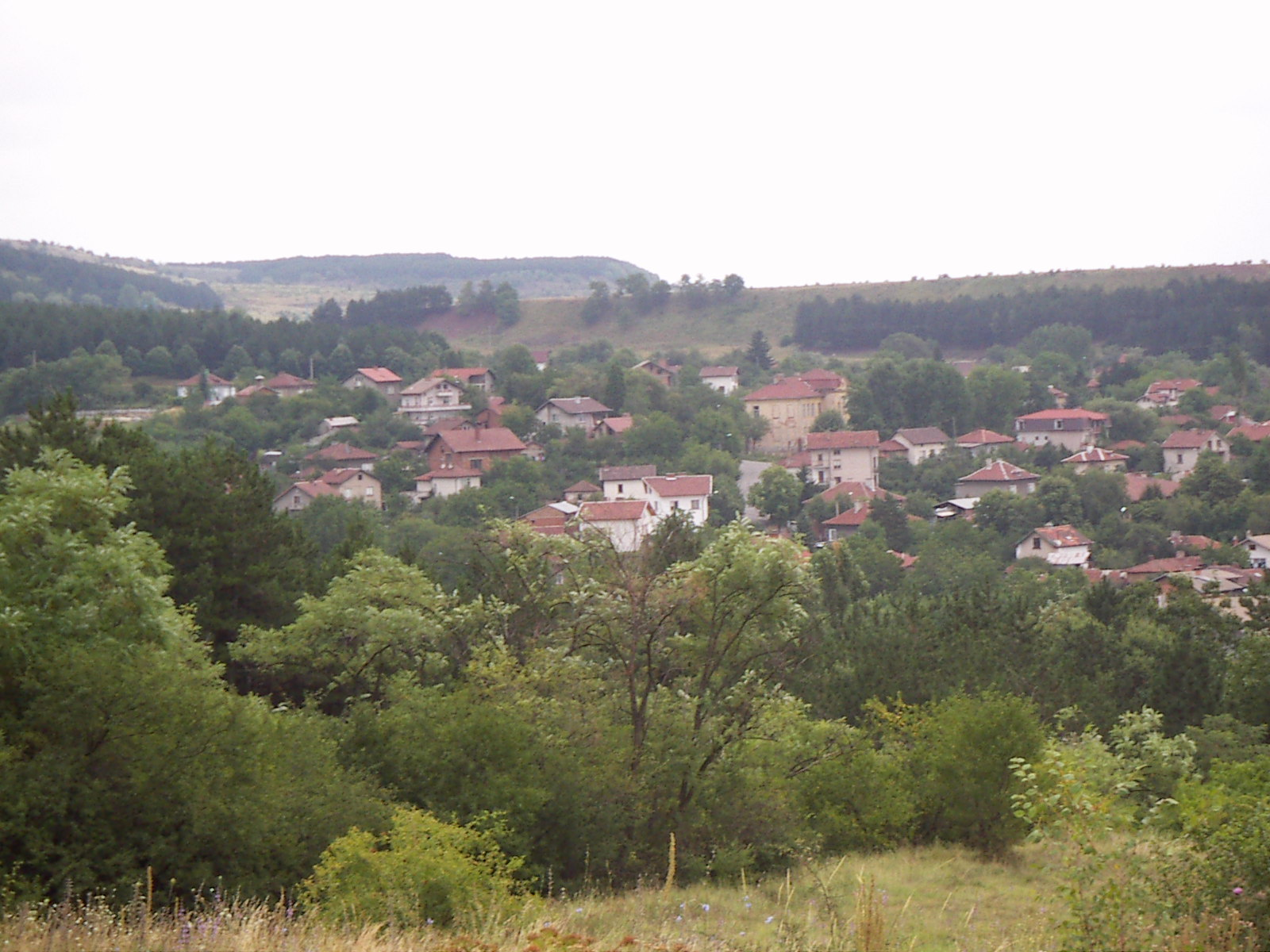
A view of Lokorsko

The village is situated at an altitude of 589 m on the southern slopes of the Balkan Mountains facing the northern part of the Sofia Valley. A small stream called the Lokorska reka runs through the village and flows into the river Lesnovska reka, a right tributary of the Iskar. There are several small waterfalls along the stream just north of the village.

Administratively, Lokorsko is part of the Novi Iskar district of Stolichna Municipality in the northern part of the Sofia City Province. It has a territory of 34.244 km^{2}. The closest settlements are the Kremikovtsi neighbourhood of Sofia to the east, and the villages of Chepintsi to the south, Negovan to the southwest, and Voynegovtsi to the west.

Lokorsko is located north of the Sofia Ring Road and lies close to the Europe motorway (A6). It is served by three bus lines of the Sofia Public Transport that connect it to the downtown near the Sofia Metro and the Sofia Central Station.

== History and culture ==
According to the Czech-Bulgarian archaeologists Hermann and Karel Škorpil, the territory of Lokorsko was inhabited since the Stone Age. The village was first mentioned in an Ottoman document from 1452. In the mid-16th century Lokorsko, along with other Sub-Balkan villages around Sofia, became a voynuk settlement, which allowed some privileges in return for auxiliary service in the Ottoman military. After the Liberation of Bulgaria in 1878, the proximity of Lokorsko to the new capital Sofia was favourable as a market for local agricultural produce.

The school edifice was constructed during the mandate of Prime Minister Aleksandar Stamboliyski in 1919–1923 and is among the most representative buildings in the villages around Sofia. The Church of Saint Nicolas dates from the 17th century and is a monument of culture. The local cultural center, known in Bulgarian as a chitalishte, was founded in 1899 and is named after Hristo Vitkov.

== Gallery ==
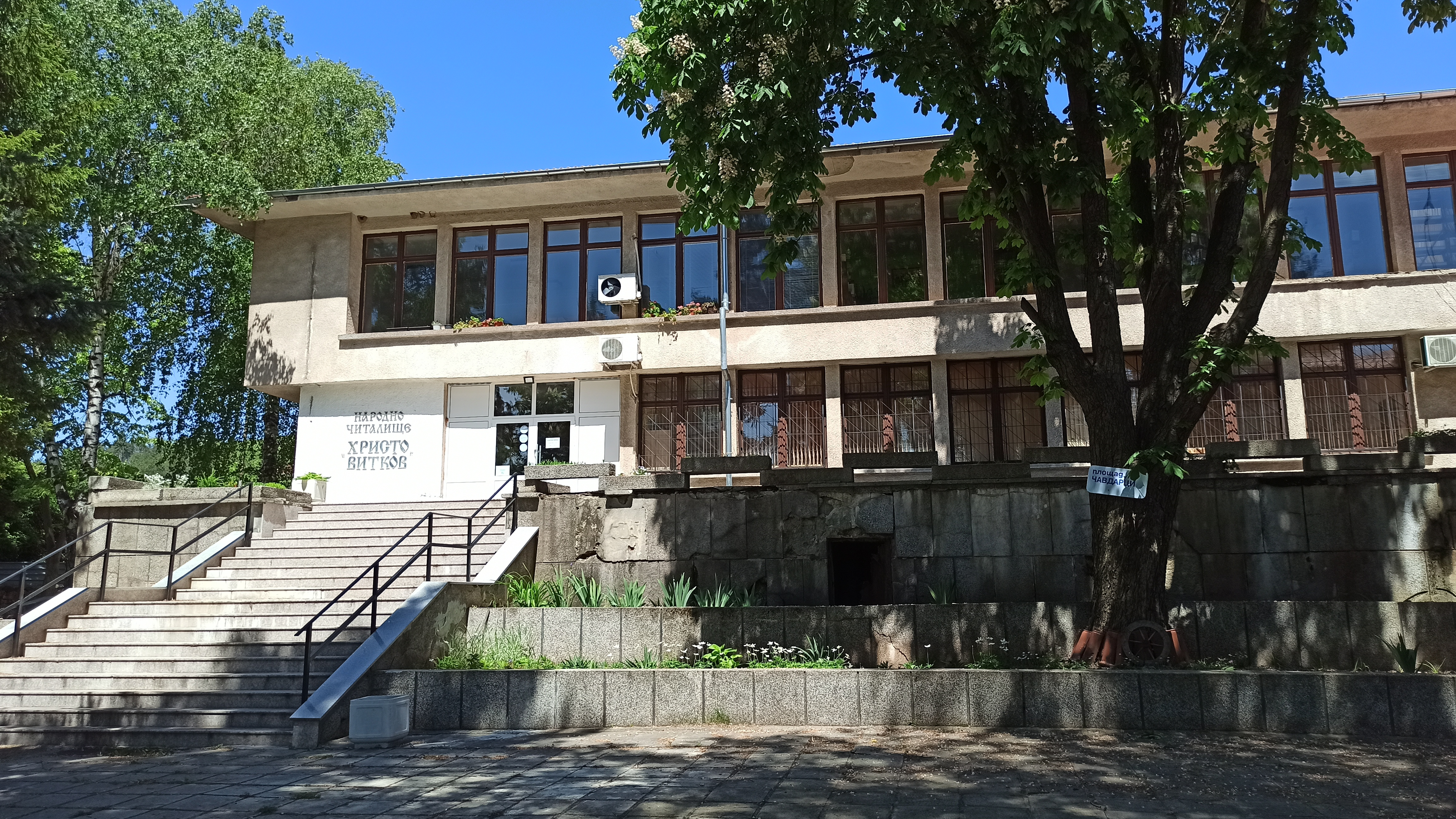
Chitalishte Hristo Vitkov

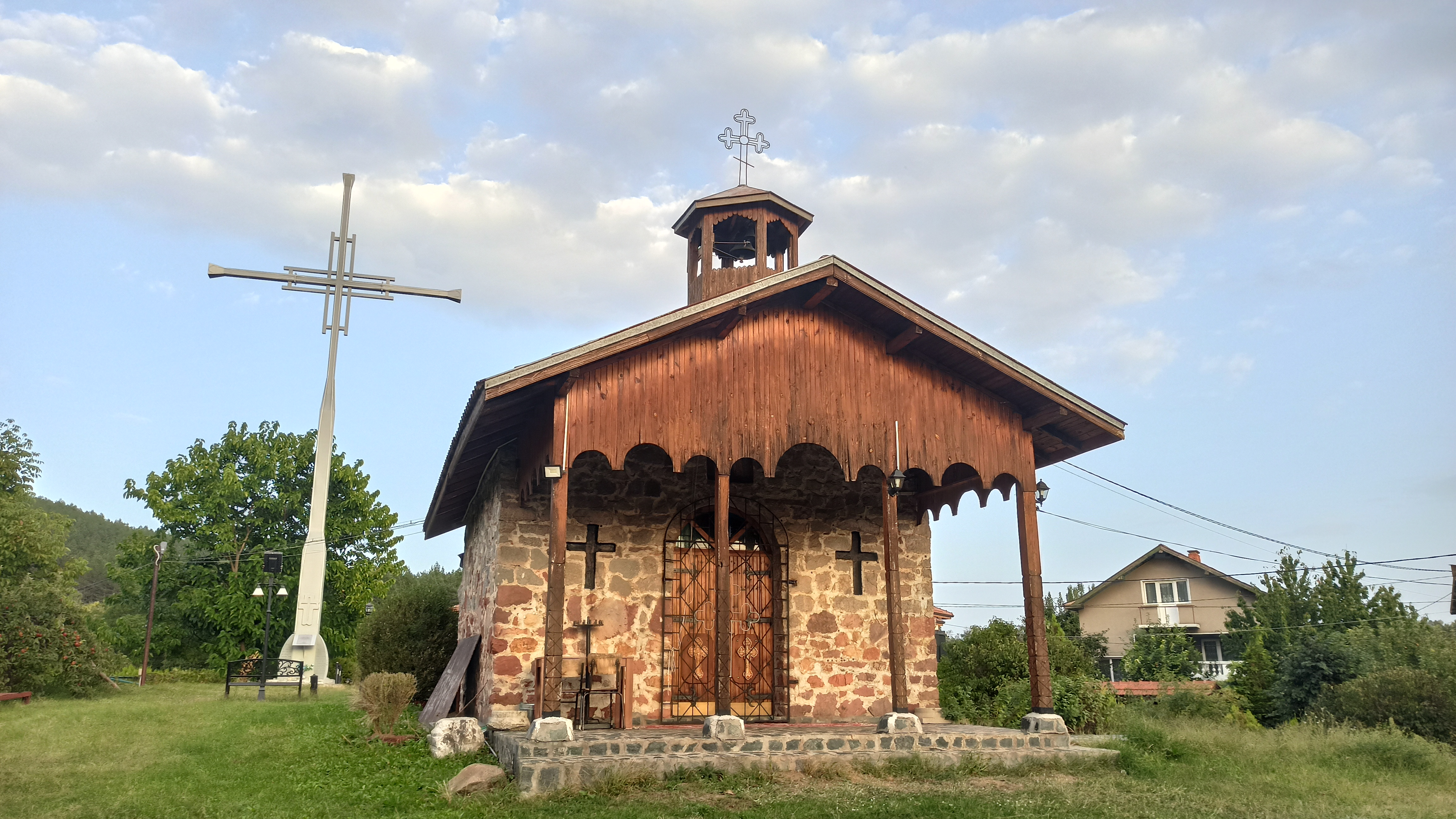
Church of Saint Nicolas

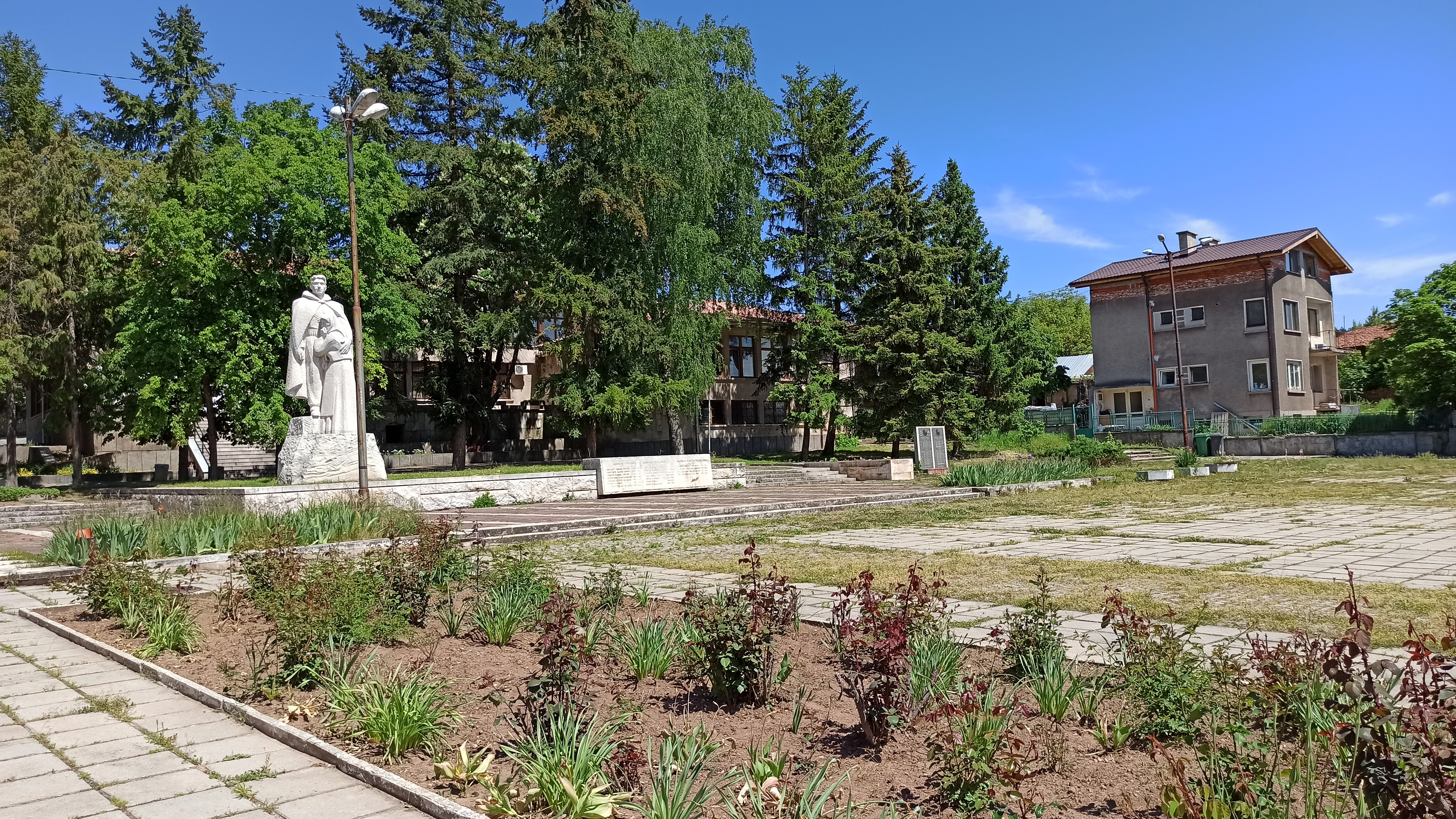
Central square

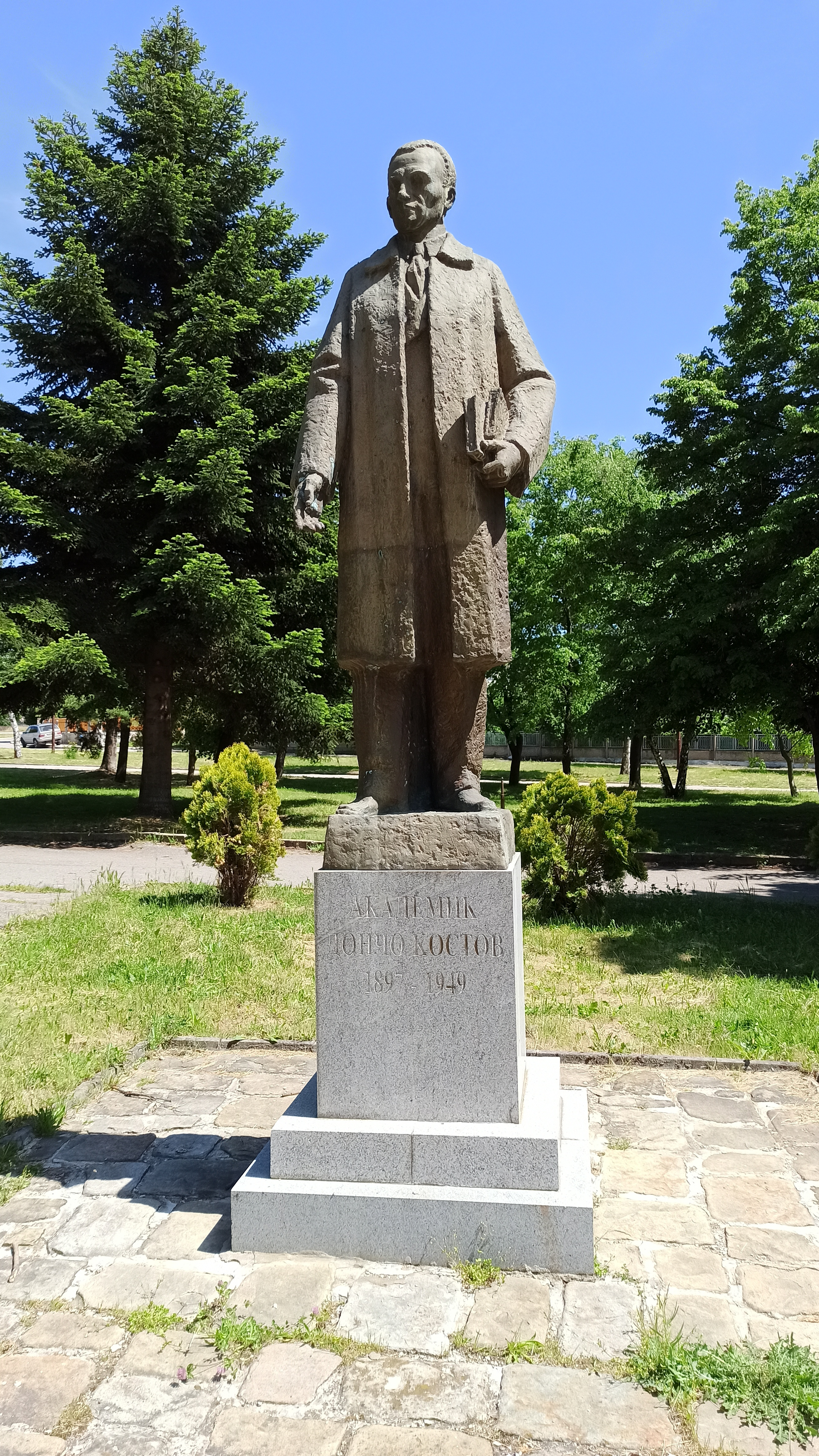
A statue
