= Zhiten, Sofia City Province =

Zhiten
- Village
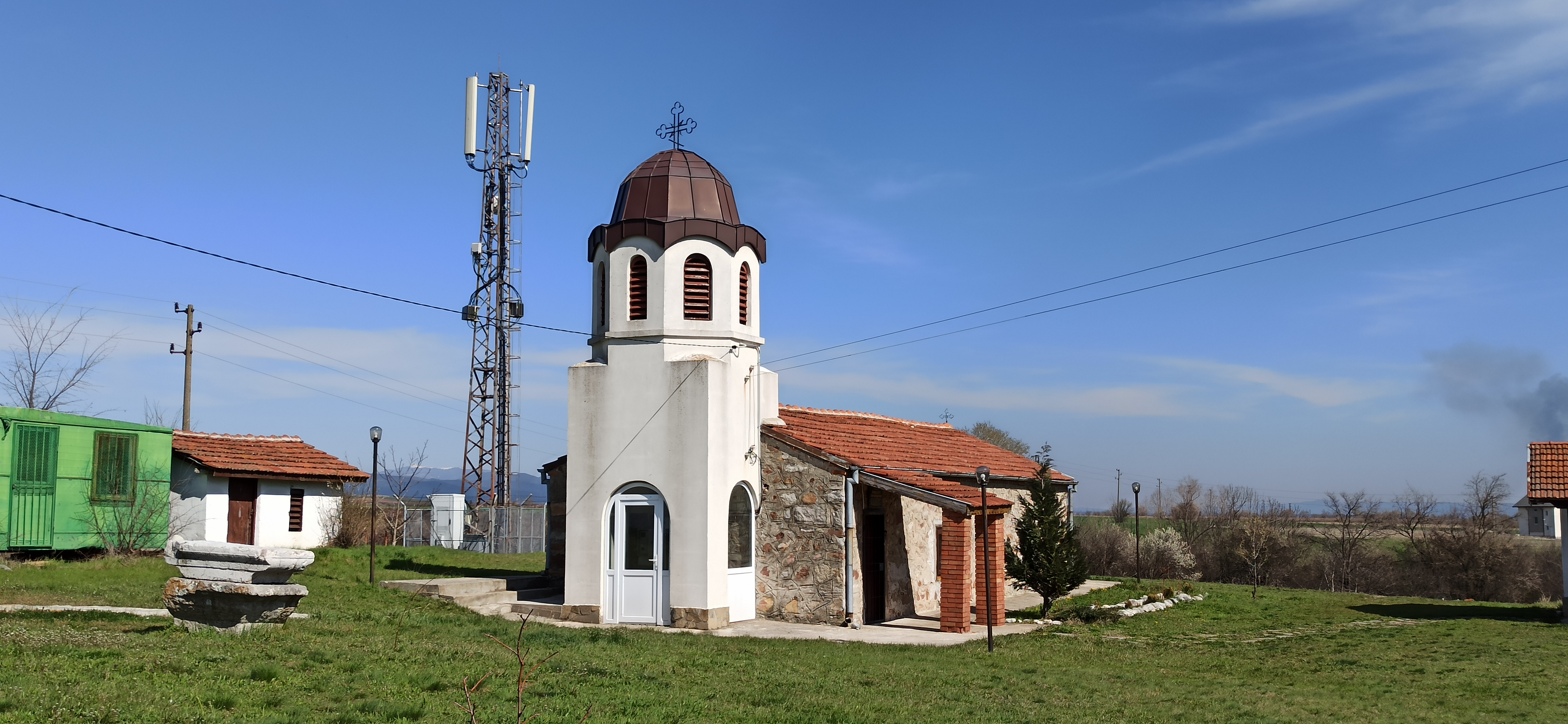

- Location within Bulgaria
- Coordinates: 42°49′0″N 23°15′0″E
- Country: Bulgaria
- Province: Sofia City
- Municipality: Stolichna Municipality
- Elevation: 537 m (1,762 ft)

Population (2024)
  - Total: 606
- Time zone: UTC+2 (EET)
  - Summer (DST): UTC+3 (EEST)
- Postal code: 1211

Zhiten (Bulgarian: Житен) is a village in Novi Iskar district of the Bulgarian capital Sofia, located some 15 km northwest of the city center. As of 2024 it has 606 inhabitants.

== Geography ==
The village is situated at an altitude of 537 m in the northwestern part of the Sofia Valley, close to the southern slopes of the Balkan Mountains. The river Kriva reka runs through the village and flows into the Blato, a left tributary of the Iskar, about a kilometer south of the village.

Administratively, Zhiten is part of the Novi Iskar district of Stolichna Municipality in the northwestern part of the Sofia City Province, on the limits of the neighbouring Sofia Province. It has a territory of 5.784 km^{2}. The closest settlements are the town of Kostinbrod to the west, as well as the villages of Golyanovtsi to the northwest, Dobroslavtsi to the east, and Mramor to the south.

Zhiten is located about 5 km northwest of the junction between the Sofia Ring Road and the Europe motorway (A6). It lies close to the second class II-16 road Sofia–Montana–Lom. The village is served by two bus lines of the Sofia Public Transport.

== Culture ==
The local cultural center, known in Bulgarian as a chitalishte, was founded in 1921 and is named Nauka, meaning science.
