= Svetovrachene =

- Village
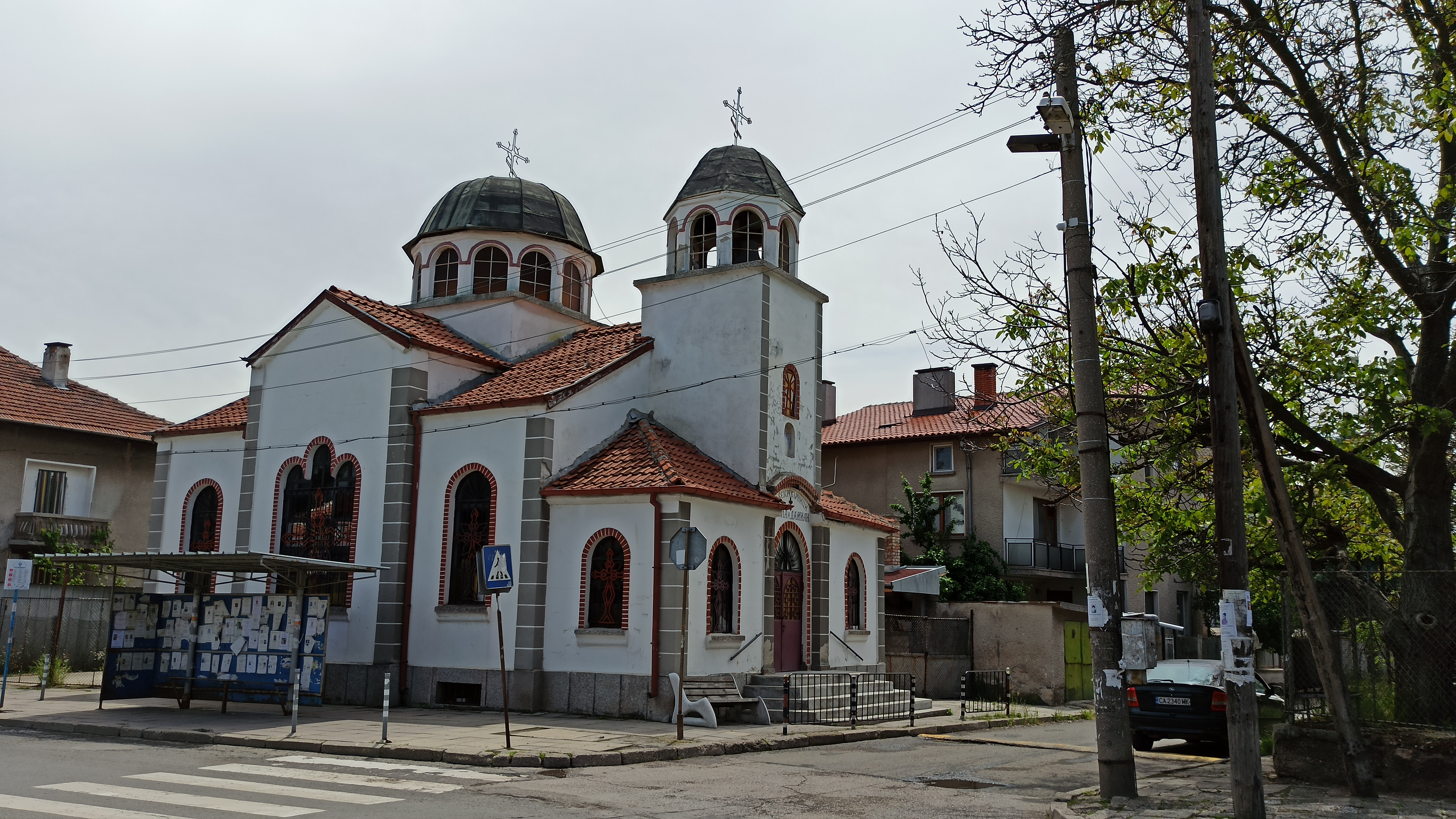

- Location within Bulgaria
- Coordinates: 42°46′54.8″N 23°23′1.64″E
- Country: Bulgaria
- Province: Sofia City
- Municipality: Stolichna Municipality
- Elevation: 522 m (1,713 ft)

Population (2024)
  - Total: 1,430
- Time zone: UTC+2 (EET)
  - Summer (DST): UTC+3 (EEST)
- Postal code: 1252

Svetovrachene (Bulgarian: Световрачене) is a village in Novi Iskar district of the Bulgarian capital Sofia, located some 12 km north of the city center. As of 2024 it has 2,206 inhabitants.

== Geography ==
The village is situated at an altitude of 522 m in the central part of the Sofia Valley, across on the north bank of the river Lesnovska reka shortly before its confluence with the Iskar. It falls within the continental climatic zone. The soils are alluvial.

Administratively, Svetovrachene is part of the Novi Iskar district of Stolichna Municipality in the northern part of the Sofia City Province. It has a territory of 4.958 km^{2}. The closest settlements are the outskirts of the town of Novi Iskar to the north, and the villages of Podgumer to the north, Voynegovtsi to the northeast, Negovan to the southeast, and Kubratovo to the southwest.

Svetovrachene is located south of the Sofia Ring Road and lies close to the Europe motorway (A6). There is a railway used for freight traffic running along its northern outskirts, as well as a railway station. It is served by several bus lines of the Sofia Public Transport.

== Economy ==
There two chemical factories producing rubber, paints and varnishes. There are farmlands dedicated to grain, sunflower and vegetables, as well as livestock breeding.

== Culture ==
The village was first mentioned in 1450. The local school was established in 1892. There is a church dedicated to the Saints Cosmas and Damian. The local cultural center, known in Bulgarian as a chitalishte, was founded in 1925 and is named after the revolutionary Hristo Botev.
