= Podgumer =

- Village
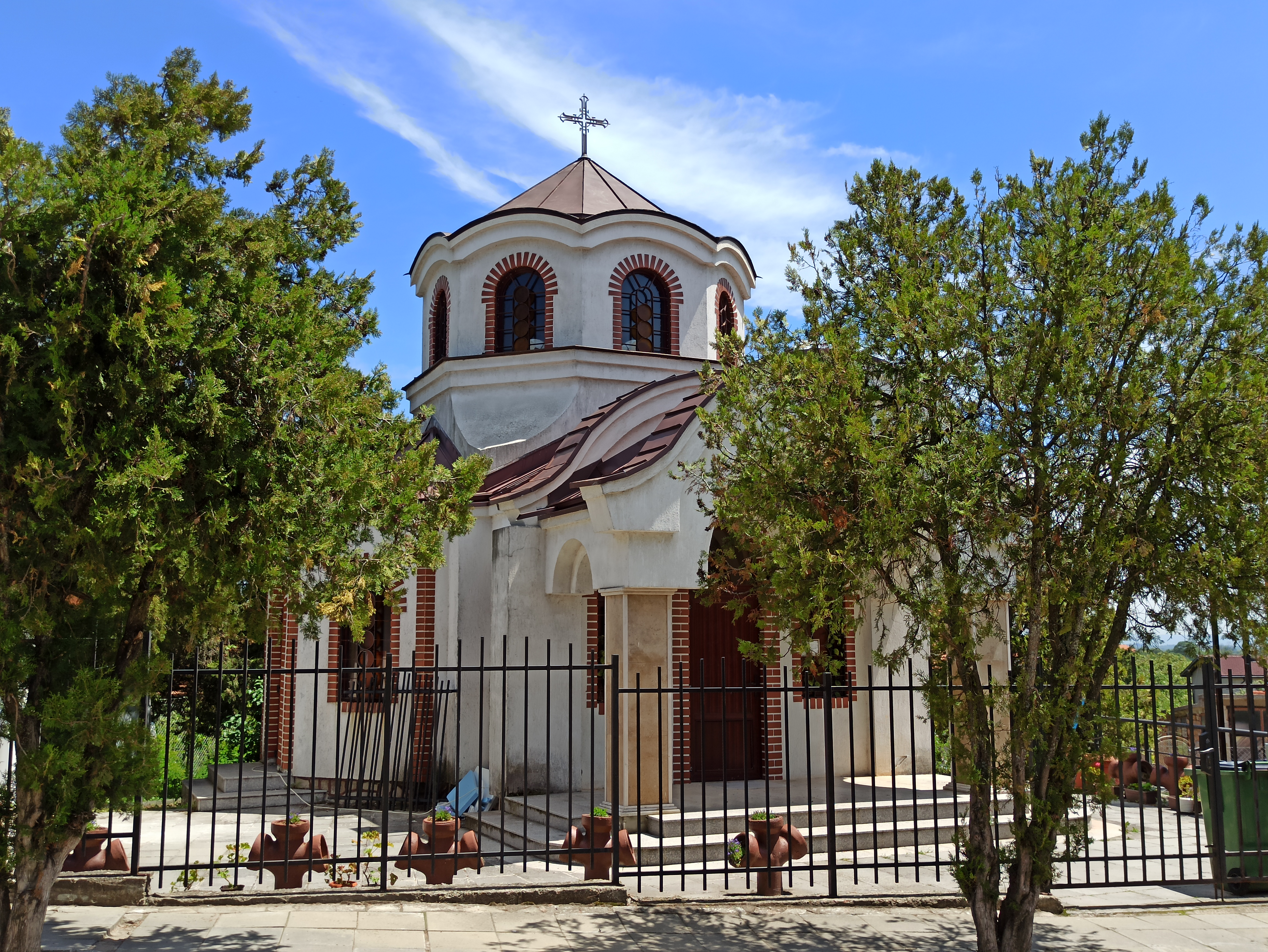

- Location within Bulgaria
- Coordinates: 42°48′17.85″N 23°24′14.79″E
- Country: Bulgaria
- Province: Sofia City
- Municipality: Stolichna Municipality
- Elevation: 570 m (1,870 ft)

Population (2024)
  - Total: 889
- Time zone: UTC+2 (EET)
  - Summer (DST): UTC+3 (EEST)
- Postal code: 1221

Podgumer (Bulgarian: Подгумер) is a village in Novi Iskar district of the Bulgarian capital Sofia, located some 17 km north of the city center. As of 2024 it has 889 inhabitants.

== Geography ==
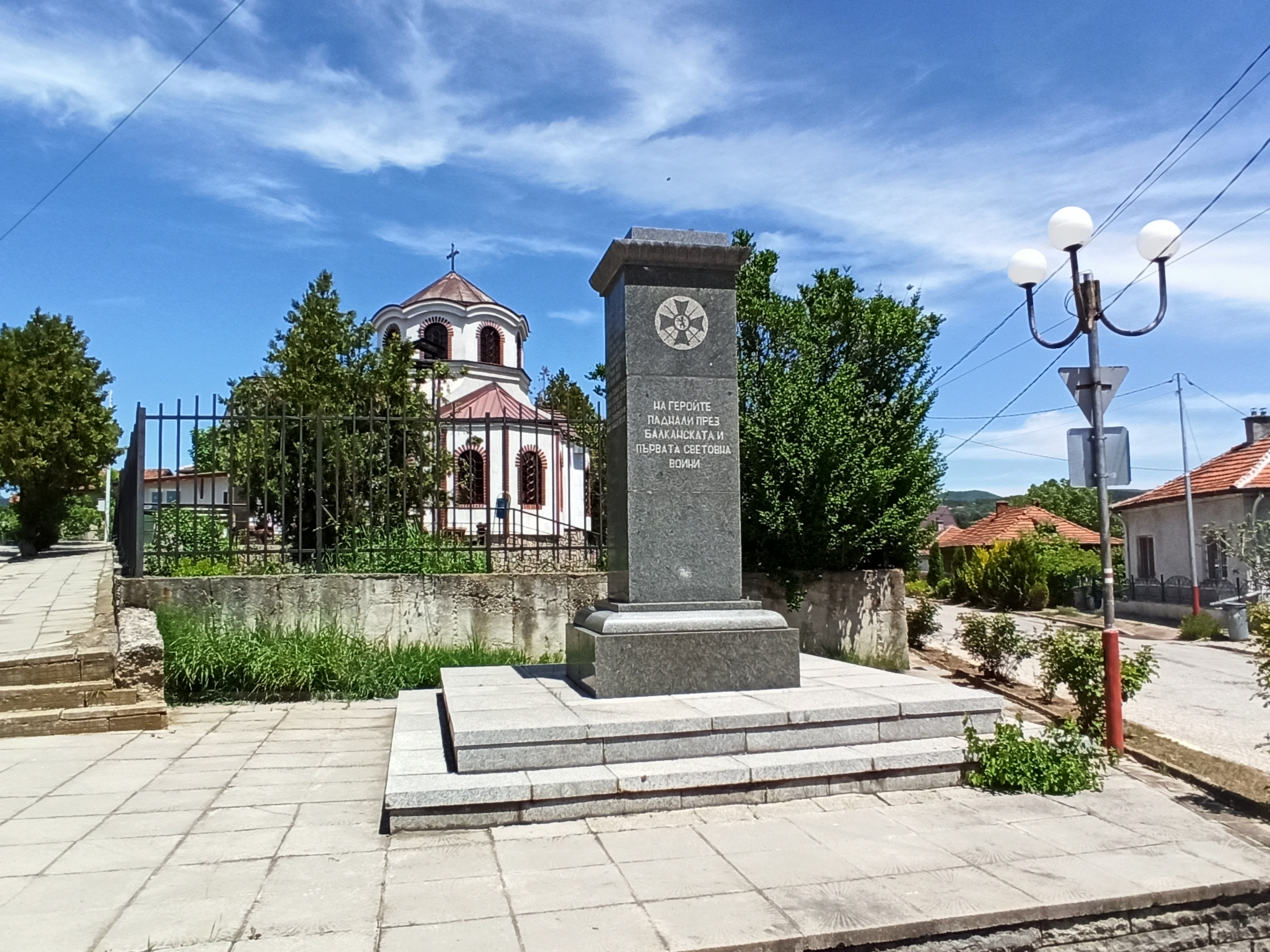
Podgumer war memorial

The village is situated at an altitude of 570 m on the southern slopes of the Balkan Mountains facing the northern part of the Sofia Valley. A small stream called the Podgumerska reka runs through the village and flows into the river Lesnovska reka shortly before the latter’s confluence with the Iskar. Podgumer falls within the transitional continental climatic zone. There are several villa areas around the village.

Administratively, Podgumer is part of the Novi Iskar district of Stolichna Municipality in the northern part of the Sofia City Province. It has a territory of 11.644 km^{2}. The closest settlements are the Gnilyane neighbourhood of the town of Novi Iskar to the west, and the villages of Voynegovtsi to the east, and Svetovrachene to the southwest.

Podgumer is located north of the Sofia Ring Road and lies close to the Europe motorway (A6). It is served by a bus line of the Sofia Public Transport that connects it to the downtown near the Sofia Metro and the Sofia Central Station.

== History and culture ==
The village was first mentioned in 1420. The medieval Podgumer Monastery of Saint Demetrius was destroyed in the late 14th century during the Bulgarian–Ottoman wars and was restored in 1596. Its narthex was decorated by the 16th century Bulgarian painter and saint Pimen Zografski. In the mid-20th century the monastery was converted into a home for elders with mental disabilities. The local cultural center, known in Bulgarian as a chitalishte, was founded in 1928 and is named after the Saints Cyril and Methodius.
