= Kubratovo =

- Village
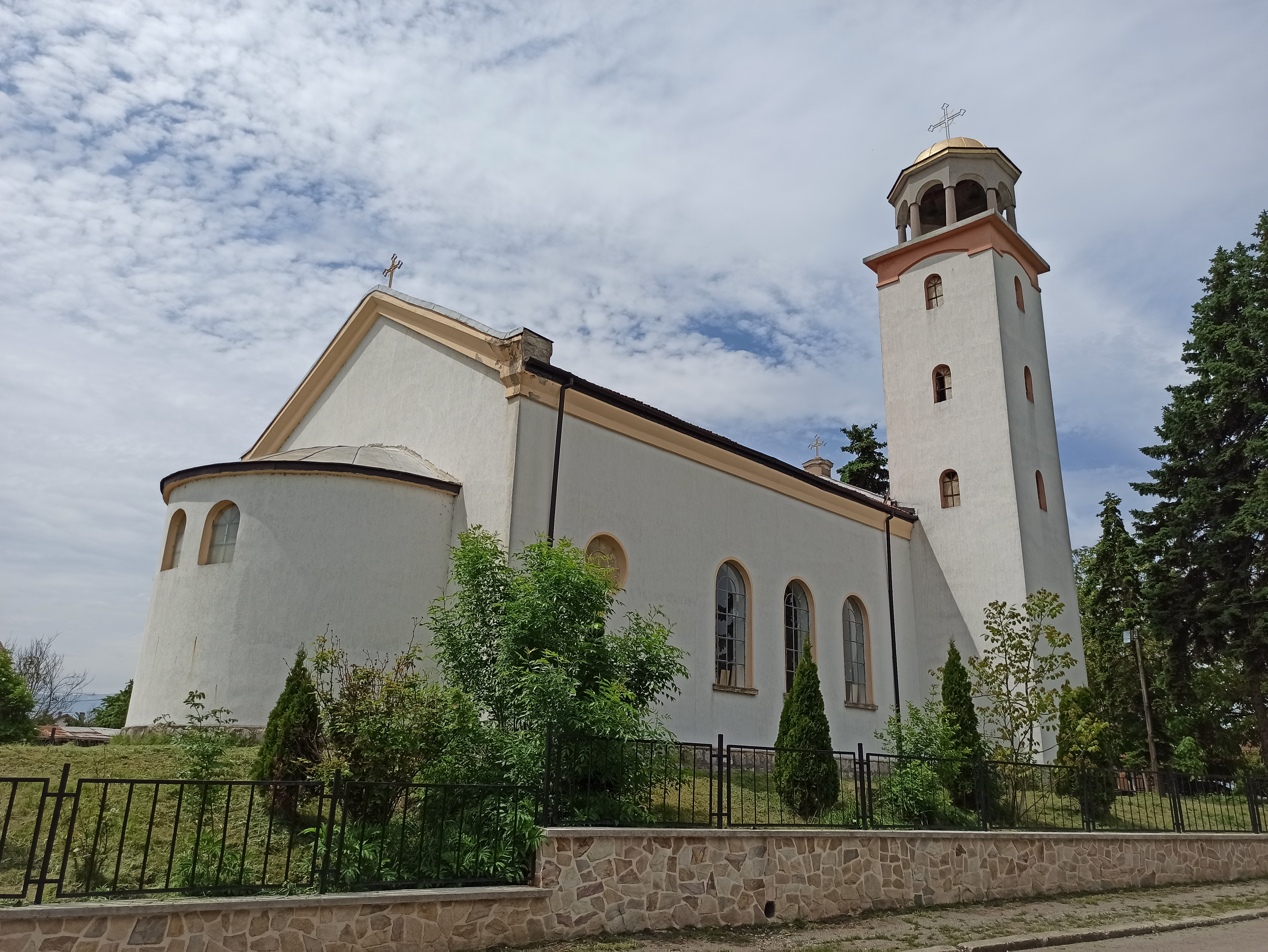

- Location within Bulgaria
- Coordinates: 42°46′0″N 23°21′0″E
- Country: Bulgaria
- Province: Sofia City
- Municipality: Stolichna Municipality
- Elevation: 512 m (1,680 ft)

Population (2024)
  - Total: 634
- Time zone: UTC+2 (EET)
  - Summer (DST): UTC+3 (EEST)
- Postal code: 1257

Kubratovo (Bulgarian: Кубратово) is a village in Novi Iskar district of the Bulgarian capital Sofia, located some 9 km north of the city center. As of 2024 it has 634 inhabitants.

== Geography ==
The village is situated at an altitude of 512 m in the northern part of the Sofia Valley along the left bank of the river Iskar, shortly before it receives the tributaries the Lesnovska reka and the Blato.

Administratively, Kubratovo is part of the Novi Iskar district of Stolichna Municipality in the northern part of the Sofia City Province. It has a territory of 8.668 km^{2}. The closest settlements are the outskirts of the town of Novi Iskar to the north, the village of Svetovrachene to the northeast, and the outskirts of Sofia to the south.

Kubratovo is located between the northern arc of the Sofia Ring Road and the Europe motorway (A6). There is a railway station. The village is served by several bus lines of the Sofia Public Transport that connect it to the downtown near the Sofia Metro and the Sofia Central Station.

== Economy ==
The Kubratovo Wastewater Treatment Plant is located south of the village and is the largest facility of its kind in Southeastern Europe with a capacity of 400,000 m3 of domestic and industrial wastewater per day. Since the installation of cogeneration units in 2009, the plant produces up to 23,000 MWh of electricity, or 23% more energy than is needed for its operation.

== History and culture ==
In the late antiquity during the 3rd and 4th century, there were brickworks at the site that supplied the construction works in Roman Serdica, as the city of Sofia was known at the time. In 1906–1907, numerous square bricks, some with inscriptions, were found in the Mogilata area near Kubratovo, some of which are on display in the National Archaeological Museum in Sofia. In 1859–1860 the population of the village donated funds for the construction of the Saint Nedelya Cathedral in Sofia. The local cultural center, known in Bulgarian as a chitalishte, was founded in 1915 and is named Svetlina, meaning light.
