= Stolichna Municipality =

Stolichna Municipality Столична община
- Municipality
- Stolichna Municipality within Bulgaria and Sofia-City Province
- Coordinates: 42°41′N 23°19′E
- Country: Bulgaria
- Province (Oblast): Sofia City
- Admin. centre (Obshtinski tsentar): Sofia

Area
  - Total: 1,348.9 km^{2} (520.8 sq mi)

Population (2025)
  - Total: 1,295,931
  - Density: 960.73/km^{2} (2,488.3/sq mi)
- Time zone: UTC+2 (EET)
  - Summer (DST): UTC+3 (EEST)

The Stolichna Municipality (Bulgarian: Столична община, romanized: Stolichna obshtina (also transcribed as Stolična obština), lit. 'Capital Municipality') is an obshtina (municipality) in Sofia City Province, Western Bulgaria. It is named after its administrative centre, the city of Sofia, which is also the capital of Sofia City Province and Sofia Province and the capital of Bulgaria as well.

The municipality is located mainly in the Sofia Valley, and also in the feet and lower parts of the mountains of Stara planina and Vitosha, Plana, Lozen, Rila. As of 2025, the National Statistical Institute projected that it was home to 1,232,905 inhabitants, of which 1,205,548 live in Sofia.

== Settlements ==
Sofia Capital Municipality includes the following 38 places (cities are shown in bold):

Balsha, Bankya, Bistritsa, Buhovo, Busmantsi, Chepintsi, Dobroslavtsi, Dolni Bogrov, Dolni Pasarel, German, Gorni Bogrov, Ivanyane, Zheleznitsa, Zhelyava, Zhiten, Kazichene, Klisura, Kokalyane, Krivina, Kubratovo, Katina, Lokorsko, Lozen, Malo Buchino, Marchaevo, Mirovyane, Mramor, Negovan, Novi Iskar, Pancharevo, Plana, Podgumer, Sofia, Svetovrachene, Vladaya, Voluyak, Voynegovtsi and Yana

== Demography ==
Historical population
Year	Pop.	±%
1946	525,710	—
1956	724,603	+37.8%
1965	905,287	+24.9%
1975	1,076,741	+18.9%
1985	1,198,615	+11.3%
1992	1,190,126	−0.7%
2001	1,173,988	−1.4%
2011	1,291,591	+10.0%
2021	1,274,290	−1.3%

According to the latest Bulgarian census of 2011, the religious composition, among those who answered the optional question on religious identification, was the following:

Religious composition of Sofia Capital Municipality
Orthodox Christianity	86.2%
Catholicism	0.5%
Protestantism	1.0%
Islam	0.7%
No religion	4.9%
Prefer not to answer, others and indefinable	6.7%
