= Voynegovtsi =

- Village
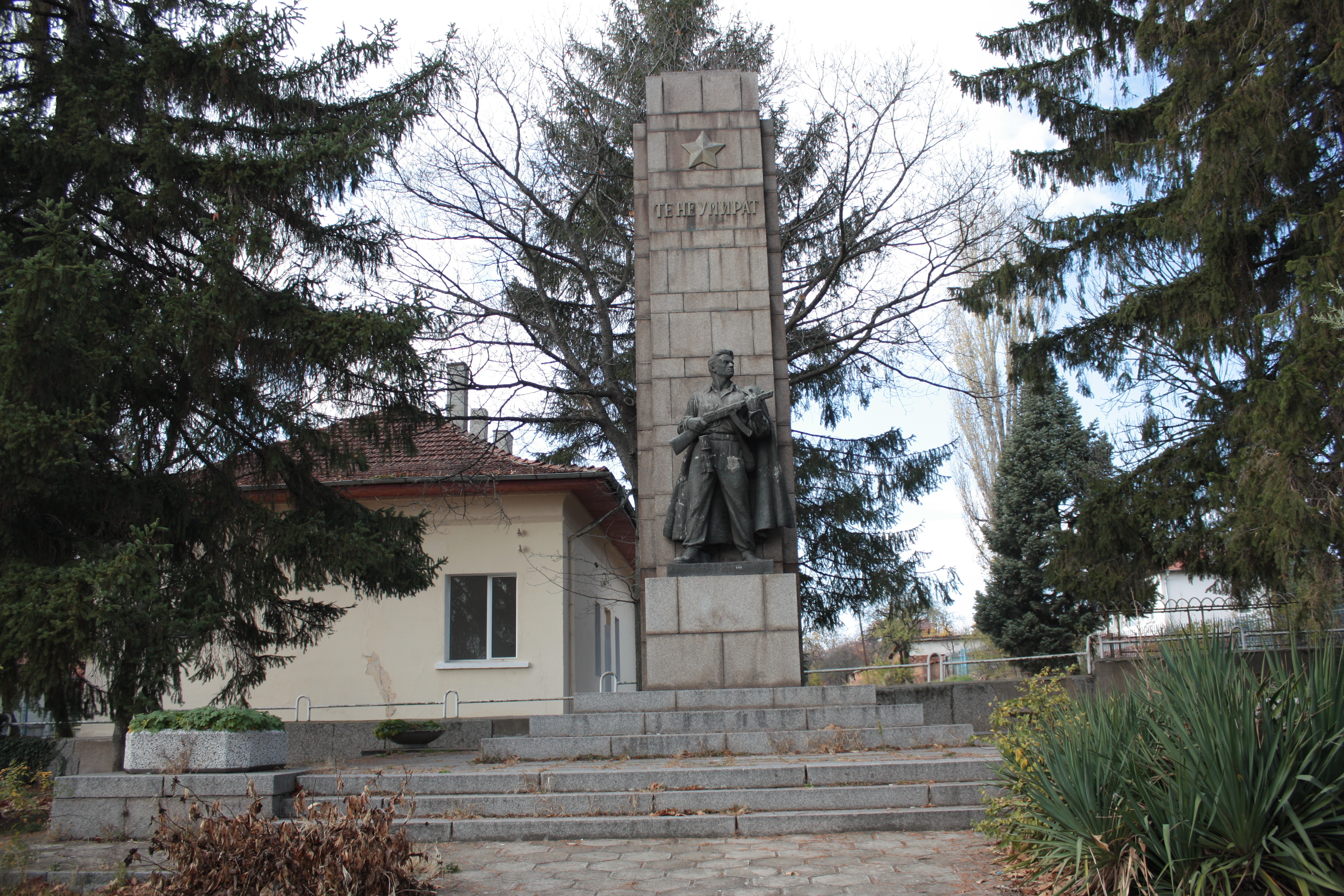

- Location within Bulgaria
- Coordinates: 42°48′3.19″N 23°25′20.07″E
- Country: Bulgaria
- Province: Sofia City
- Municipality: Stolichna Municipality
- Elevation: 599 m (1,965 ft)

Population (2024)
  - Total: 801
- Time zone: UTC+2 (EET)
  - Summer (DST): UTC+3 (EEST)
- Postal code: 1223

Voynegovtsi (Bulgarian: Войнеговци) is a village in Novi Iskar district of the Bulgarian capital Sofia, located some 17 km north of the city center. As of 2024 it has 801 inhabitants.

== Geography ==
The village is situated at an altitude of 599 m on the southern slopes of the Balkan Mountains facing the northern part of the Sofia Valley. There are several villa areas around the village.

Administratively, Voynegovtsi is part of the Novi Iskar district of Stolichna Municipality in the northern part of the Sofia City Province. It has a territory of 17.714 km^{2}. The closest settlements are the villages of Lokorsko to the east, Negovan to the south, Svetovrachene to the southwest, and Podgumer to the west.

Voynegovtsi is located north of the Sofia Ring Road and lies close to the Europe motorway (A6). It is served by two bus lines of the Sofia Public Transport that connect it to the downtown near the Sofia Metro and the Sofia Central Station.

== Culture ==
The local cultural center, known in Bulgarian as a chitalishte, was founded in 1928 and is named after the Bulgarian national hero and revolutionary Vasil Levski.
