= Chepintsi, Sofia City Province =

Chepintsi
- Village
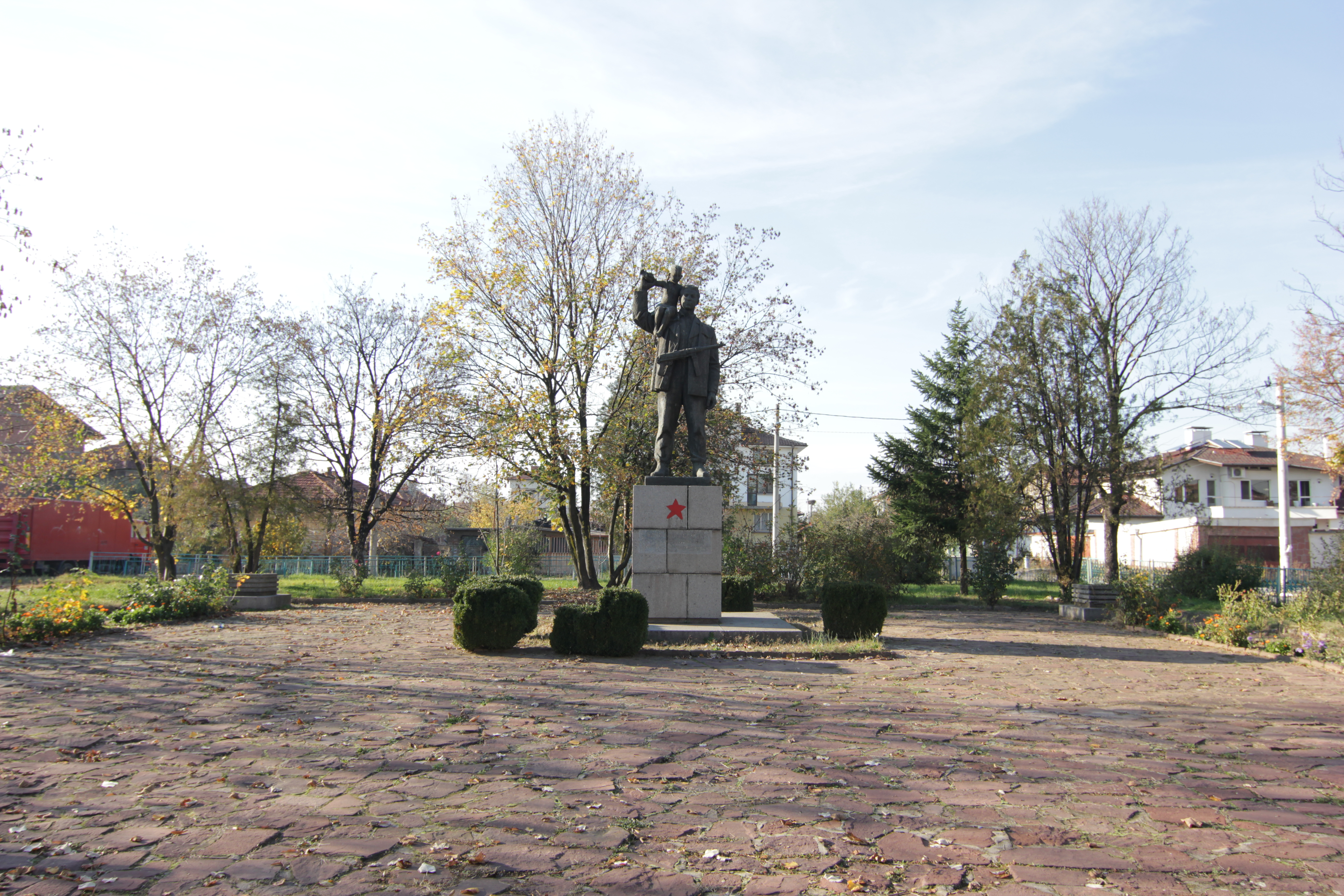

- Location within Bulgaria
- Coordinates: 42°46′0″N 23°21′0″E
- Country: Bulgaria
- Province: Sofia City
- Municipality: Stolichna Municipality
- Elevation: 5,290 m (17,360 ft)

Population (2024)
  - Total: 2,509
- Time zone: UTC+2 (EET)
  - Summer (DST): UTC+3 (EEST)
- Postal code: 1554

Chepintsi (Bulgarian: Чепинци) is a village in Novi Iskar district of the Bulgarian capital Sofia, located some 10 km north of the city center. As of 2024 it has 2,509 inhabitants.

== Geography ==
The village is situated at an altitude of 520 m in the northern part of the Sofia Valley along the right bank of the river Lesnovska reka, a right tributary of the Iskar.

Administratively, Chepintsi is part of the Novi Iskar district of Stolichna Municipality in the northern part of the Sofia City Province. It has a territory of 19.721 km^{2}. The closest settlements are the villages of Negovan to the northwest and Lokorsko to the north, as well as various outer neighbourhoods of Sofia to the south.

Chepintsi lies at the northeastern arc of the Sofia Ring Road, a few kilometers north of its major junction with the Hemus motorway (A2) and the Europe motorway (A6). There is a railway station, which is named after the neighbouring village of Lokorsko. The village is served by several bus lines of the Sofia Public Transport that connect it to the Sofia Metro.

== History and culture ==
The village was first mentioned in 1446. The Chepino Monastery of the Three Holy Hierarchs is located in its eastern outskirts. The local cultural center, known in Bulgarian as a chitalishte, was founded in 1927 and is named Napredak, meaning progress.
