= Zhiten =

Zhiten (Bulgarian: Житен) may refer to the following places in Bulgaria:

- Zhiten, Dobrich Province
- Zhiten, Sofia City Province
