= II-16 road (Bulgaria) =

Road in Bulgaria

Republic Road I-16
- Републикански път I-16

Route information
- Length: 88 km (55 mi)

Major junctions
- From: Km 163.0 of I-1, Rebarkovo
- To: Km 58.2 of I-8 and Km 18.2 of II-18, Sofia

Location
- Country: Bulgaria
- Towns: Svoge, Novi Iskar

Highway system
- Highways in Bulgaria

Republican Road II-16 (Bulgarian: Републикански път II-16) is a 2nd class road in western Bulgaria, running through the territory of Vratsa, Sofia and Sofia City Provinces. Its length is 88 km. Throughout its entire length almost parallel to the road runs a section of section of railway line No. 2 Sofia–Mezdra–Gorna Oryahovitsa–Shumen–Varna served by the Bulgarian State Railways.

== Route description ==
The road starts at Km 163.0 of the first class I-1 road in the eastern part of the village of Rebarkovo, and runs through the Iskar Gorge that bisects the western Balkan Mountains throughout most of its route. From Rebarkovo at the northern end of the gorge the road initially follows the river Iskar in direction east–west through the villages of Lyutibrod, Zverino, Eliseyna, Opletnya and Gara Lakatnik, at places serving as a southern boundary of the Vrachanski Balkan Nature Park. At Lyutibrod the road passes just opposite the group of limestone rock formations Ritlite and in one kilometer west passes near the Cherepish Monastery.

At Gara Lakatnik the road turns in southern direction and passes through the villages of Gara Bov and Tserovo, reaches the town of Svoge, and continues through the villages of Thompson, Rebrovo, Lukovo and Vlado Trichkov. South of the latter the II-16 exits the gorge and enters the Sofia Valley in the northern outskirts of the town of Novi Iskar. South of the town, it intersects with Km 58.2 of the first class I-8 road and Km 18.2 of the Sofia Ring Road (II-18).

== Gallery ==
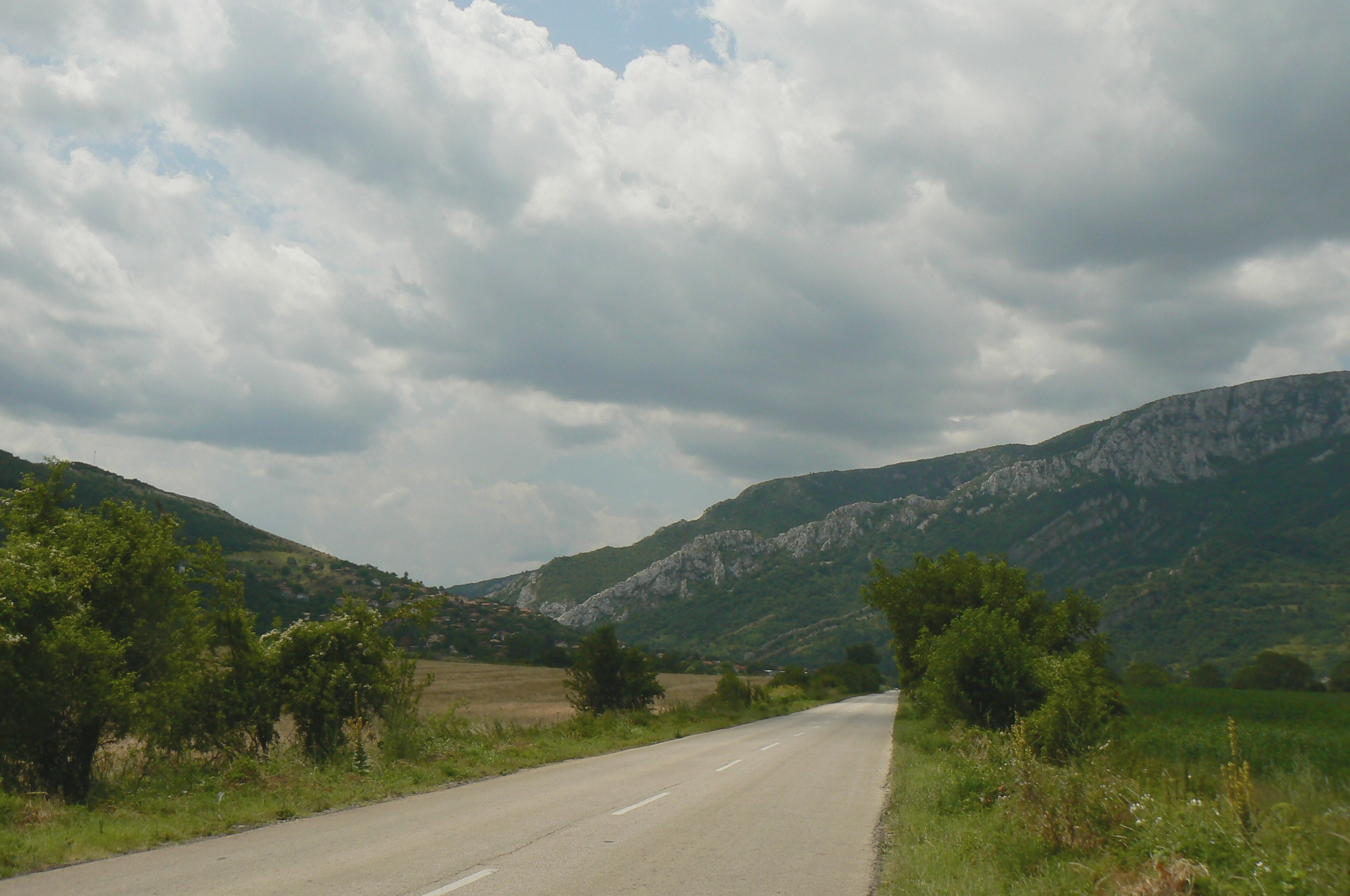
II-16 between Rebarkovo and Lyutibrod

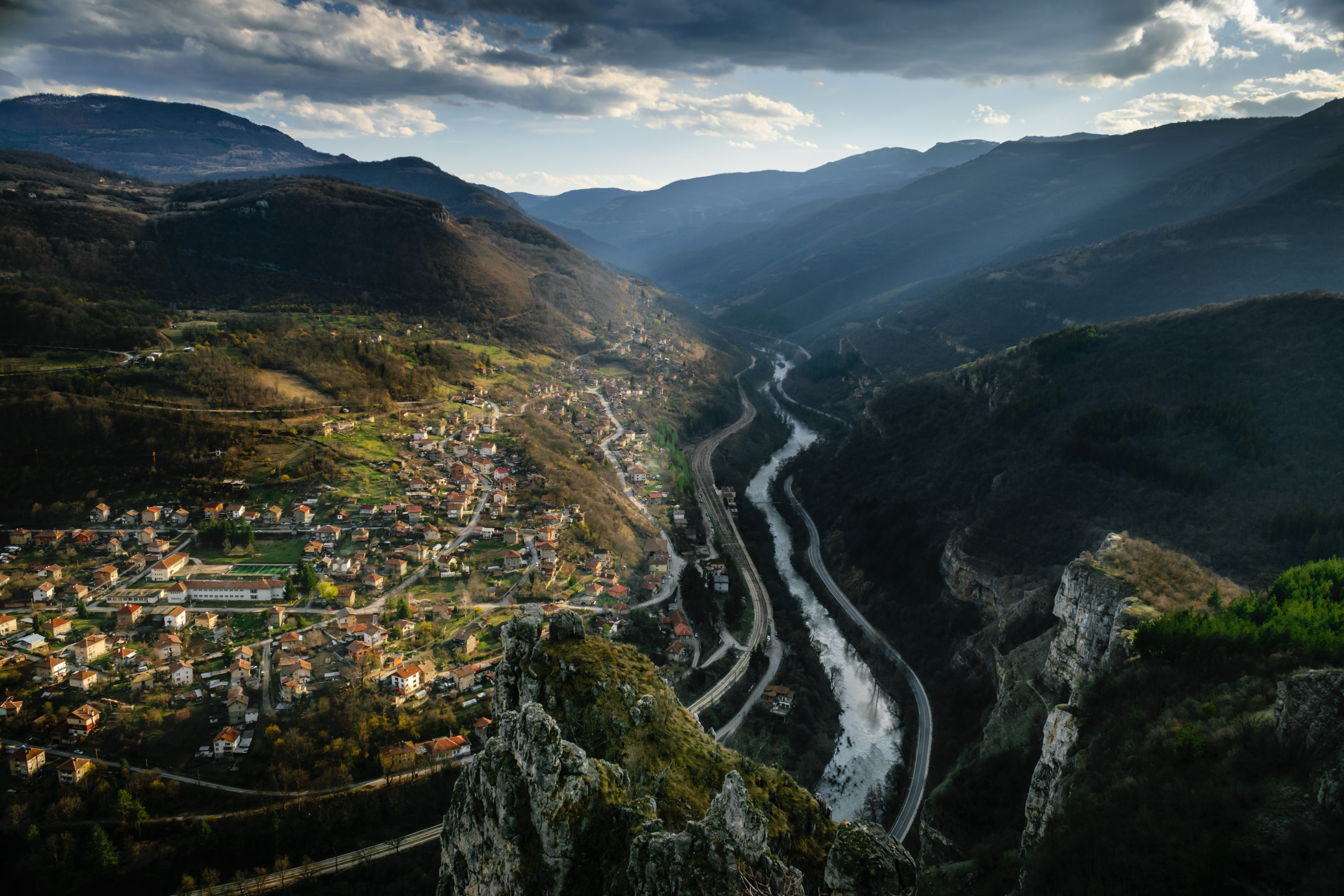
II-16 at Gara Lakatnik

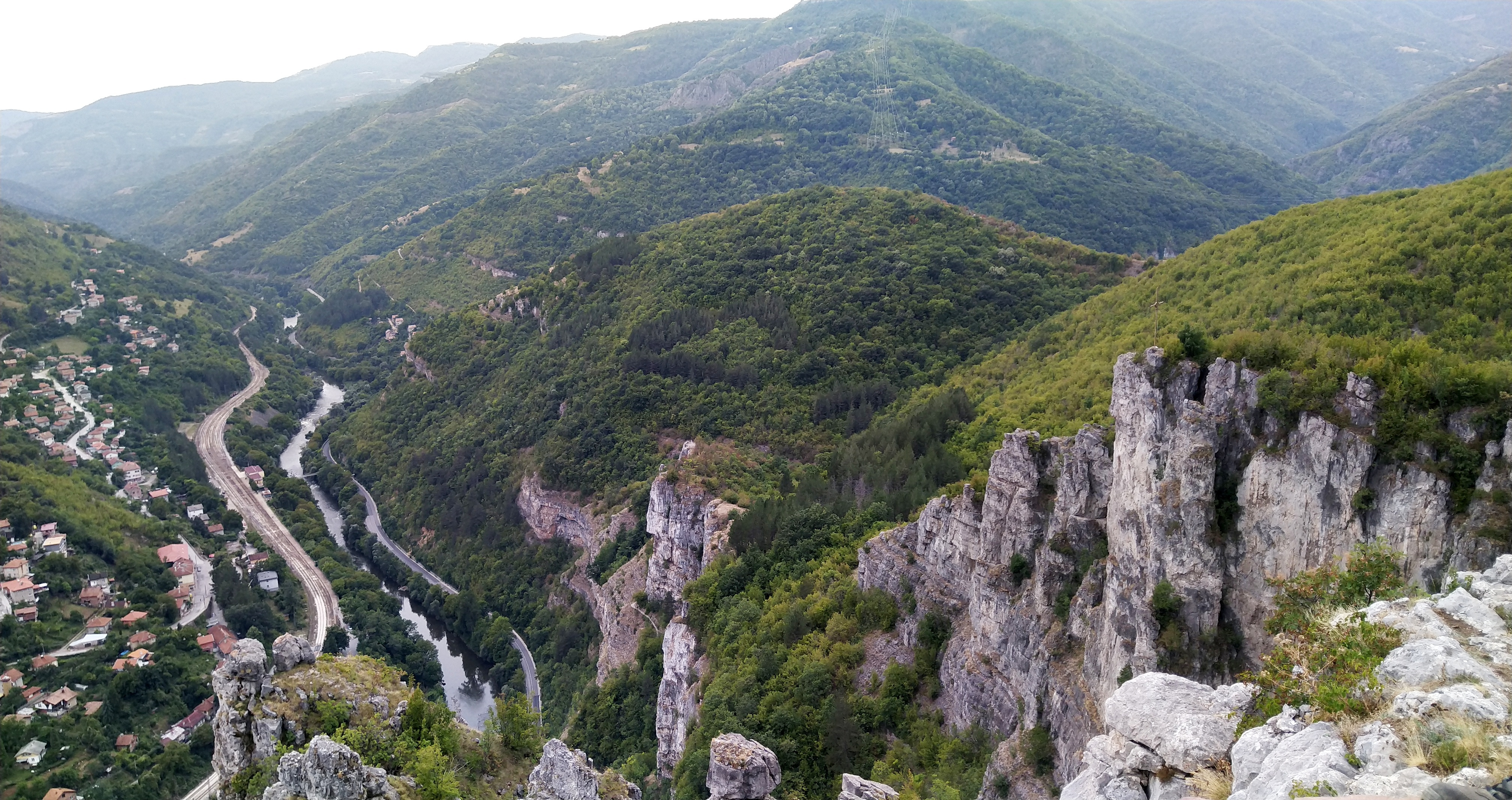
II-16 at Gara Lakatnik

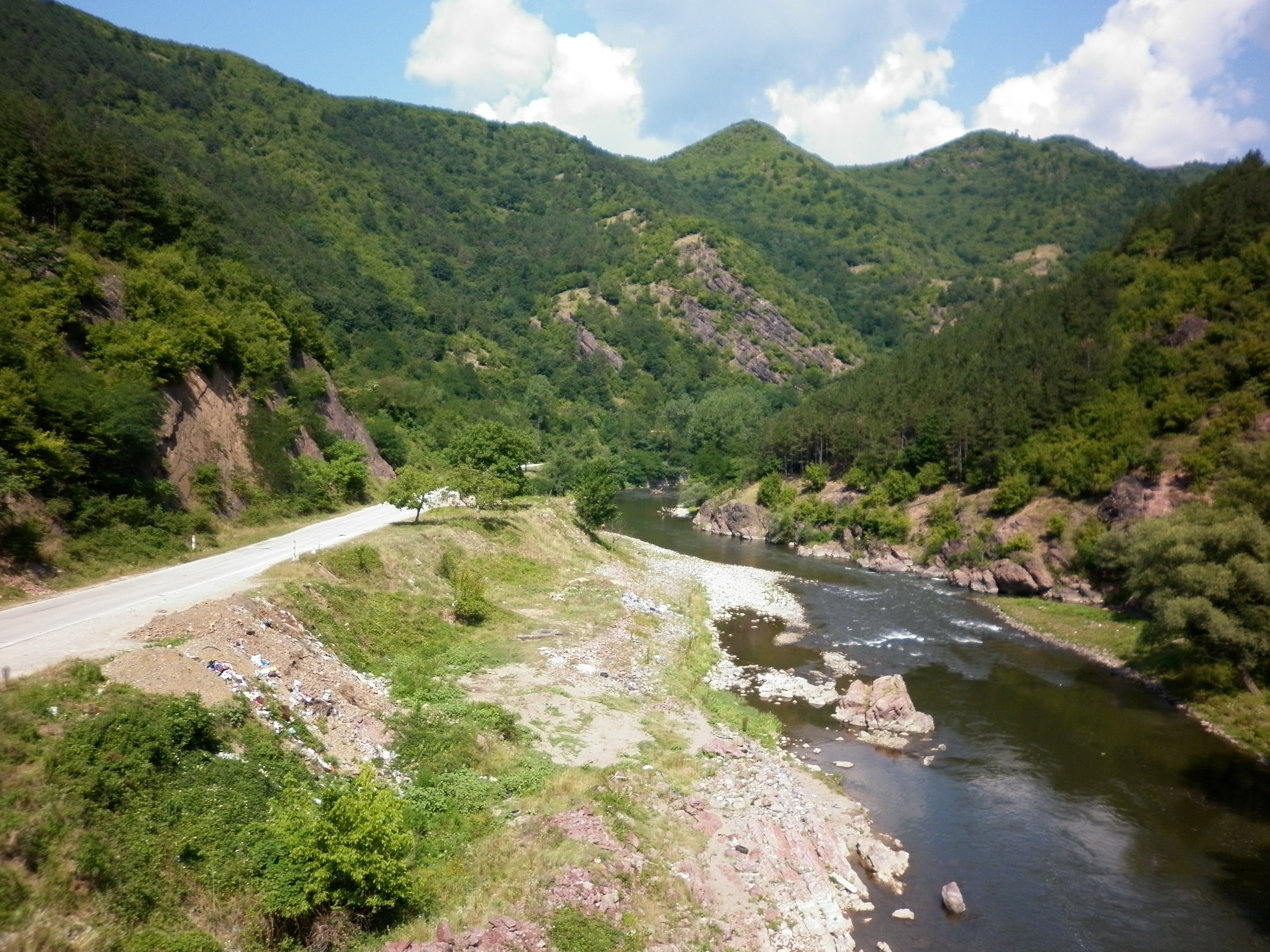
II-16 in the Iskar Gorge
