= Lesnovska reka =

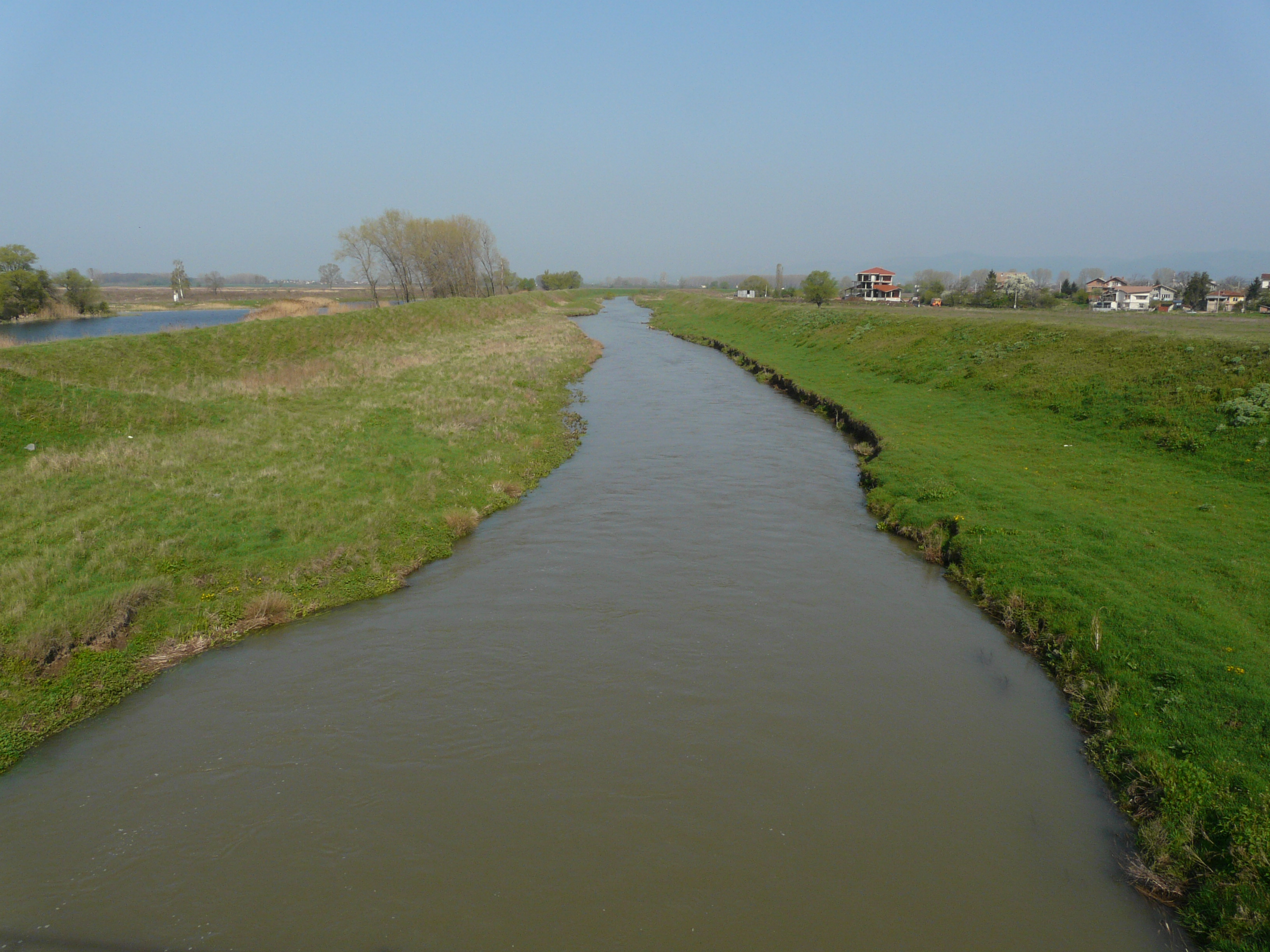

Location
- Country: Bulgaria

Physical characteristics
- Source
  - location: Golyama Ikuna, Sredna Gora
  - coordinates: 42°33′15.12″N 23°52′50.16″E
  - elevation: 1,167 m (3,829 ft)
- Mouth
  - location: Iskar
  - coordinates: 42°47′26.88″N 23°21′46.08″E
  - elevation: 510 m (1,670 ft)
- Length: 65 km (40 mi)
- Basin size: 1,096 km^{2} (423 sq mi)

Basin features
- Progression: Iskar→ Danube

The Lesnovska reka (Bulgarian: Лесновска река) is a river in western Bulgaria, a right tributary of the river Iskar, itself a right tributary of the Danube, belonging to the Black Sea drainage. Its length is 65 km. It drains parts of the Ihtimanska Sredna Gora mountain range and the Sofia Valley.

The river takes its source under the name Lopushna at an altitude of 1,167 m on the northern foothills of the summit of Golyama Ikuna (1,221 m), the highest point of the Belitsa ridge in Ihtimanska Sredna Gora. Until the village of Golema Rakovitsa it flows in northwestern direction in a deep forested valley. It then enters the Ognyanovo Reservoir, turns westwards and reaches the Sofia Valley at the village of Doganovo. From there until its mouth it flows in a corrected riverbed. At the village of Ravno Pole it again turns northwest and flows through the Chelopechene neighbourhood of the capital Sofia. The Lesnovska reka flows into the Iskar at an altitude of 510 m at 1.6 km northwest of the village of Svetovrachene.

Its drainage basin covers a territory of 1,096 km^{2} or 12.7% of the Iskar's total. Its basin encompasses the entire eastern areas of the Sofia Valley.

The Lesnovska reka has predominantly rain-snow feed with high water in April–June and low water in August–October. The average annual discharge at Chelopechene is 4.7 m^{3}/s.

The river flows in Sofia Province and Sofia City Province. There are nine settlements along its course, the city of Sofia and the town of Elin Pelin, as well as the villages of Golema Rakovitsa, Ognyanovo, Doganovo and Ravno Pole in Elin Pelin Municipality of Sofia Province and Dolni Bogrov, Chepintsi and Negovan in Stolichna Municipality of Sofia City Province. Its waters are utilised for irrigation in Sofia Valley.
