= Kurilo =

Kurilo Курило
- Village
- Location within Montenegro
- Country: Montenegro
- Municipality: Podgorica

Population (2011)
  - Total: 110
- Time zone: UTC+1 (CET)
  - Summer (DST): UTC+2 (CEST)

Kurilo (Montenegrin: Курило) is a village in the new Zeta Municipality of Montenegro. Until 2022, it was part of Podgorica Municipality.

== Demographics ==
According to the 2011 census, its population was 110.

Ethnicity in 2011
Ethnicity	Number	Percentage
Montenegrins	86	78.2%
Serbs	14	12.7%
other/undeclared	10	9.1%
Total	110	100%
