= Balsha, Bulgaria =

Village in Sofia Oblast, Bulgaria

Coordinates: 42°34′15″N 23°26′23″E

Balsha Балша
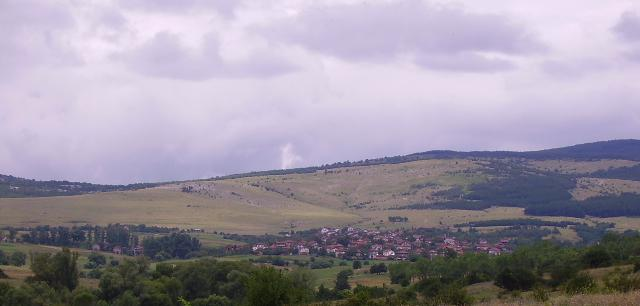
- A view over the Balsha village
- Interactive map of Balsha
- Country: Bulgaria
- Province (Oblast): Sofia City
- Named as "Pancharevo": unknown

Government
  - Mayor: Nikolay Nodkov
- Elevation: 617 m (2,024 ft)

Population (Census 2024)
  - Total: 719
- Time zone: UTC+2 (EET)
- Postal Code: 1217
- Area code: (+359) 02 ???
- Car plates: C, CA, CB

Balsha Bulgarian: Балша is a village in Sofia City Province of western Bulgaria. It has a population of 719 people (2024) and lies at 617 metres of altitude - located in Sofia Valley on the southern foothills of the western Balkan Mountains.

== History ==
According to legend, the Sofia valley was covered by a lake which reached all the way to the Balkan Mountains. Three young women got married in villages on the opposite sides of the lake - Balsha, Yana, and Boyana.

Another legend tells that a local aristocrat whose name was Balsha was helping the church and the close by monastery St Theodor Stratilat.

The Balsha village is also where Bulgarian patriot Ivan Denkoglu was born.

== Education ==
There is a primary school in the nearby village of Dobroslavtsi (179 OU), located about 4,3 km away.

== Transport ==
It is possible to reach the village with Sofia metropolitan public transport via local bus nr. 30 (from Vrabnitsa - which itself can be reached with the Sofia metro).

== Sightseeing ==
The St. Theodor Stratilat monastery is located at a walking distance from the village.

== Gallery ==
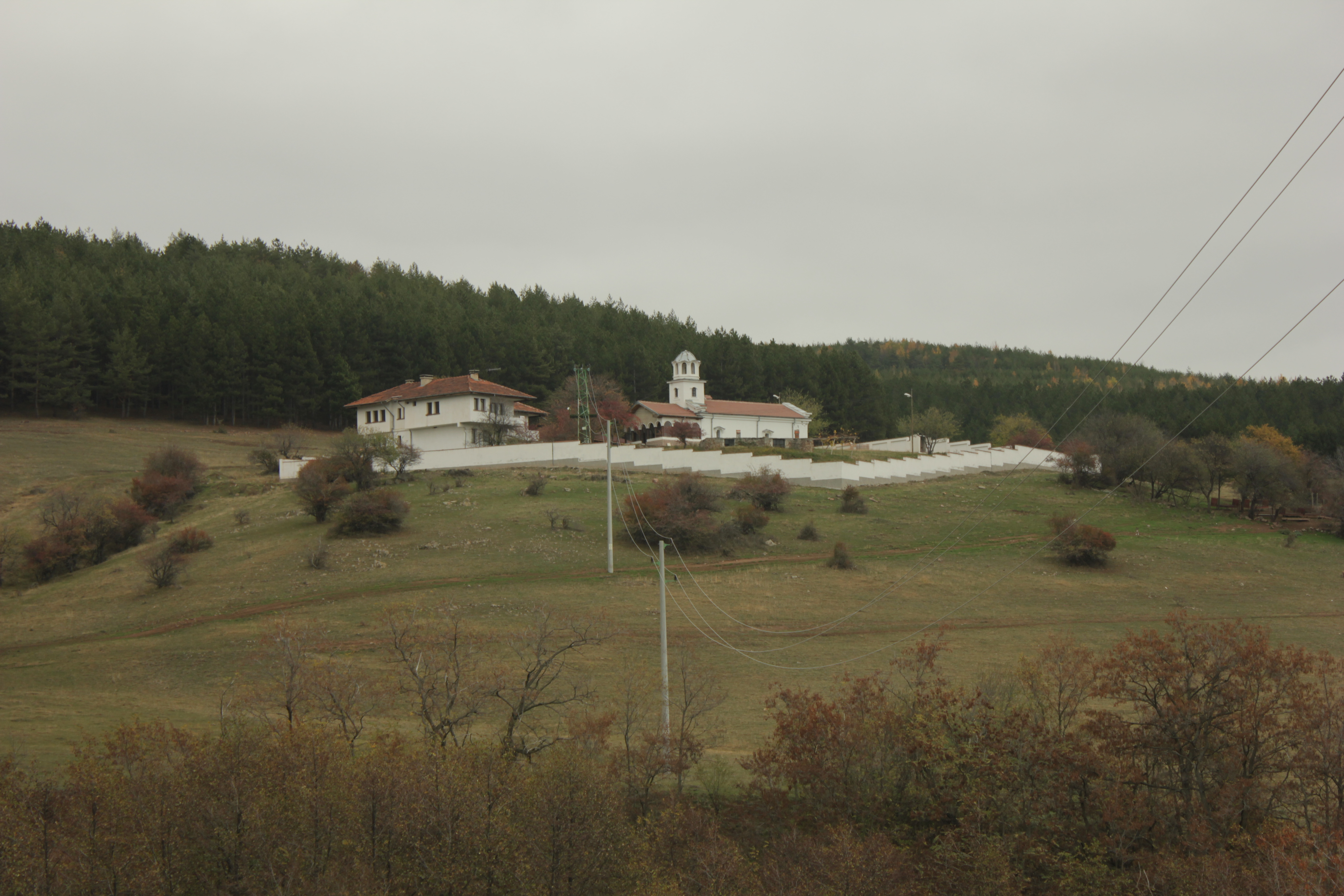
St Theodor Stratilat monastery

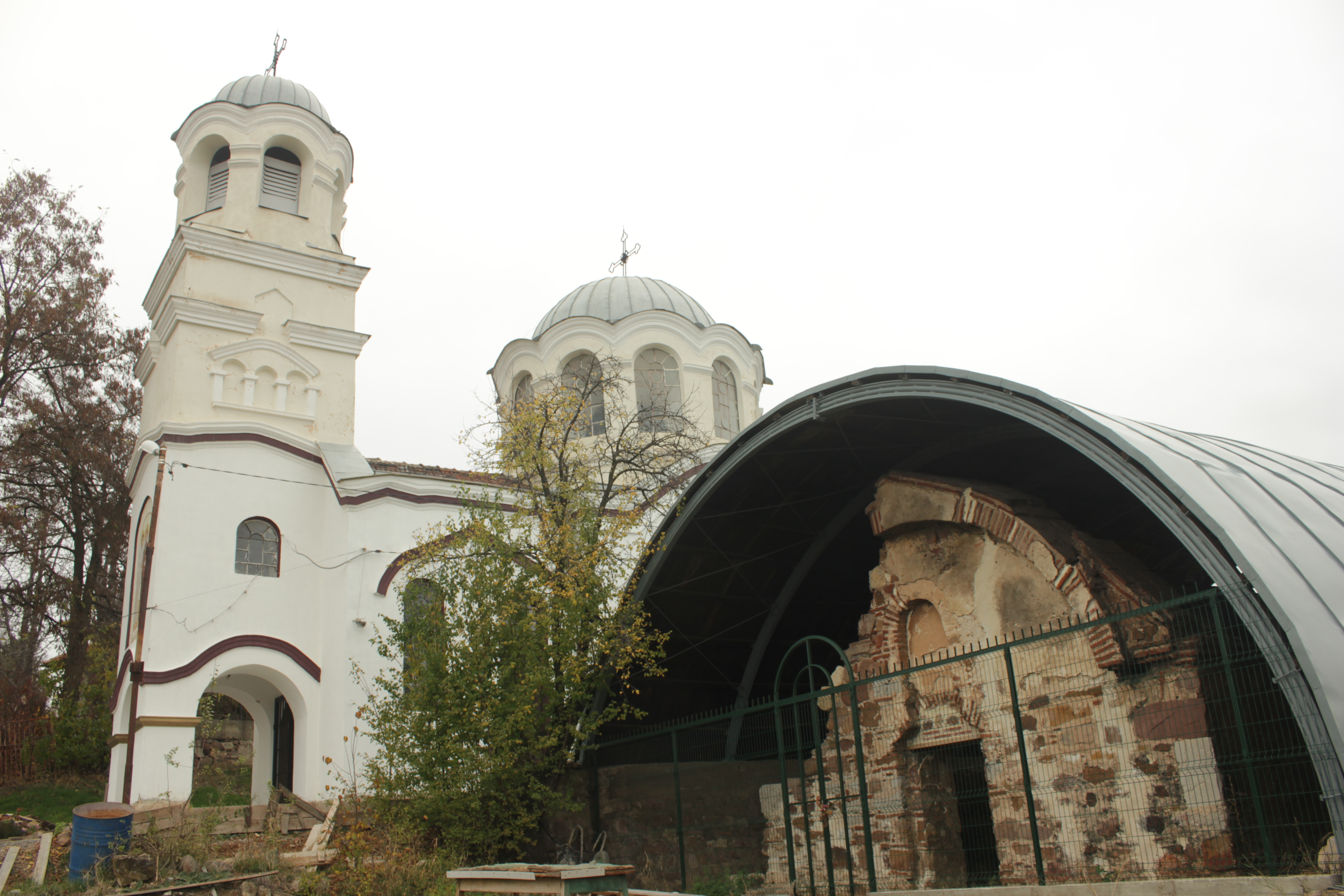
Old and new St Petka church

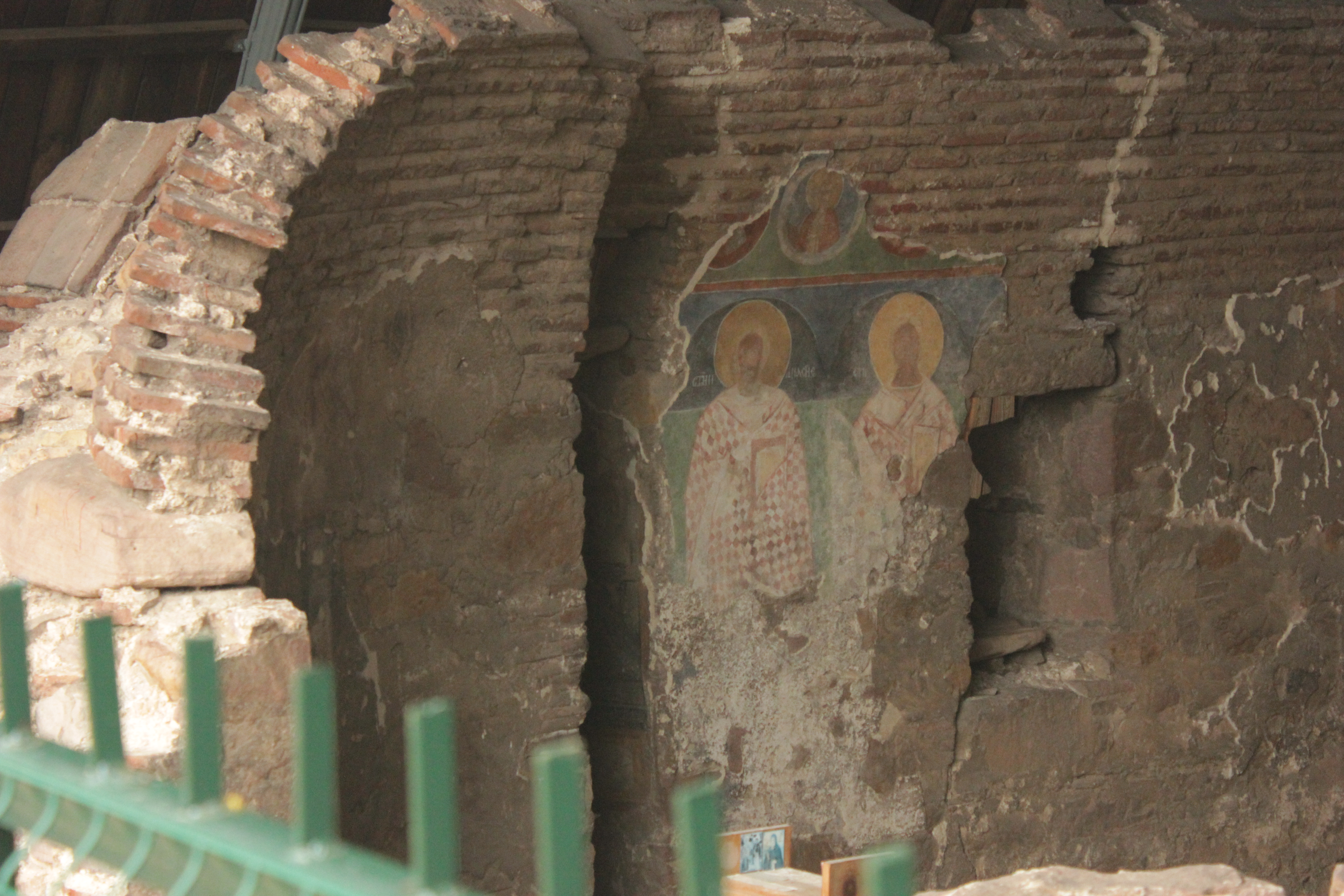
Inside of old St Petka church

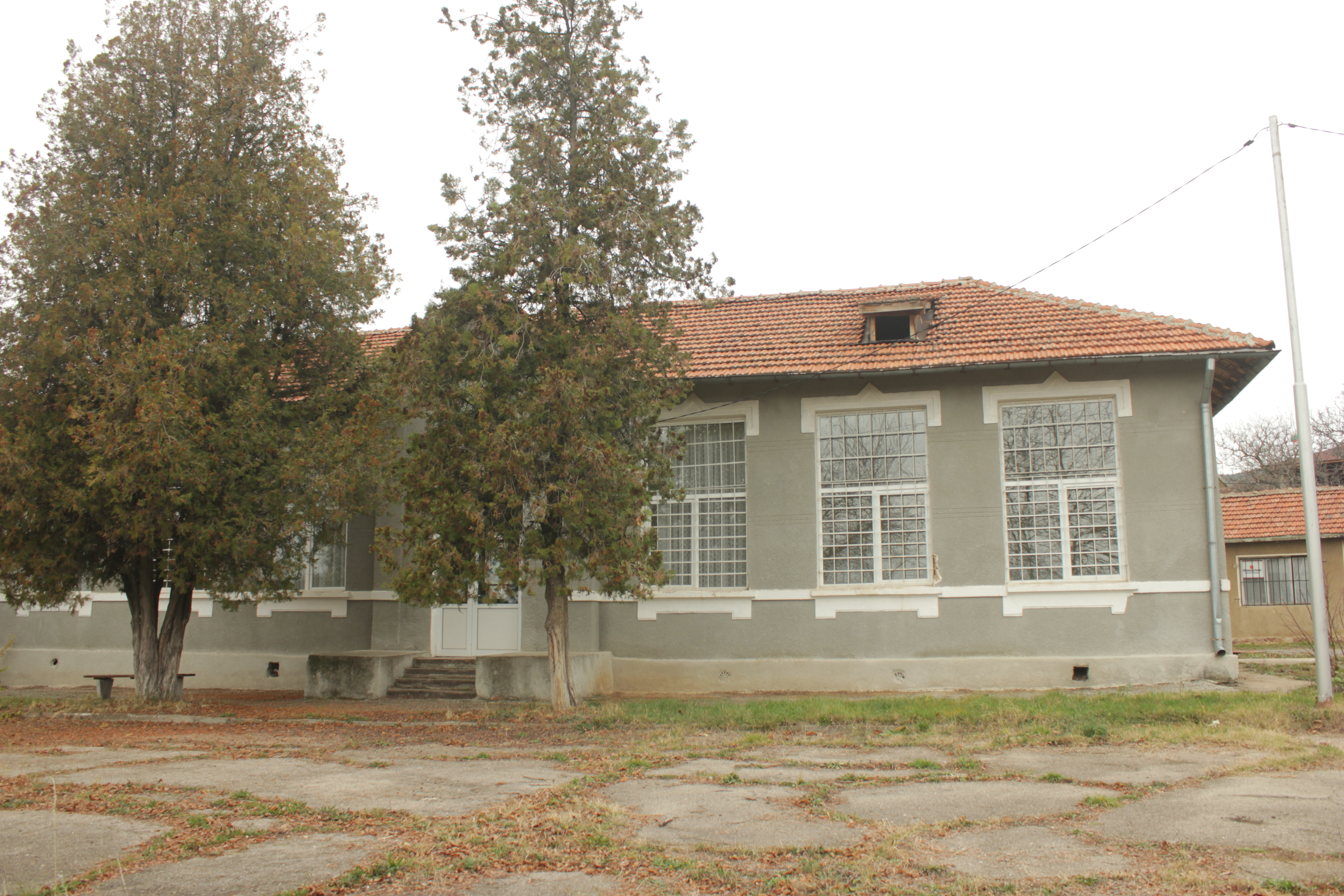
Ivan Denkoglu cultural centre

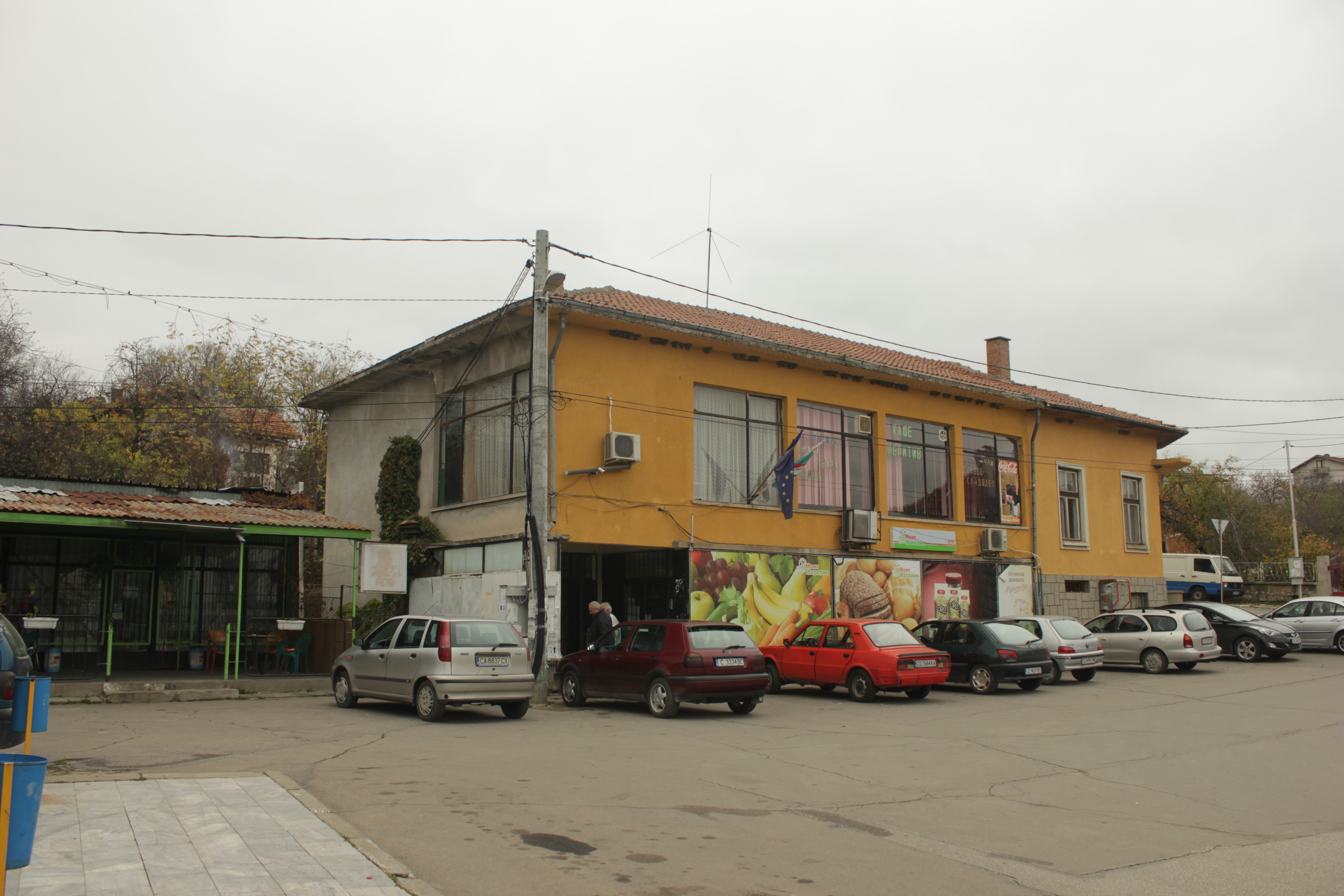
The town hall

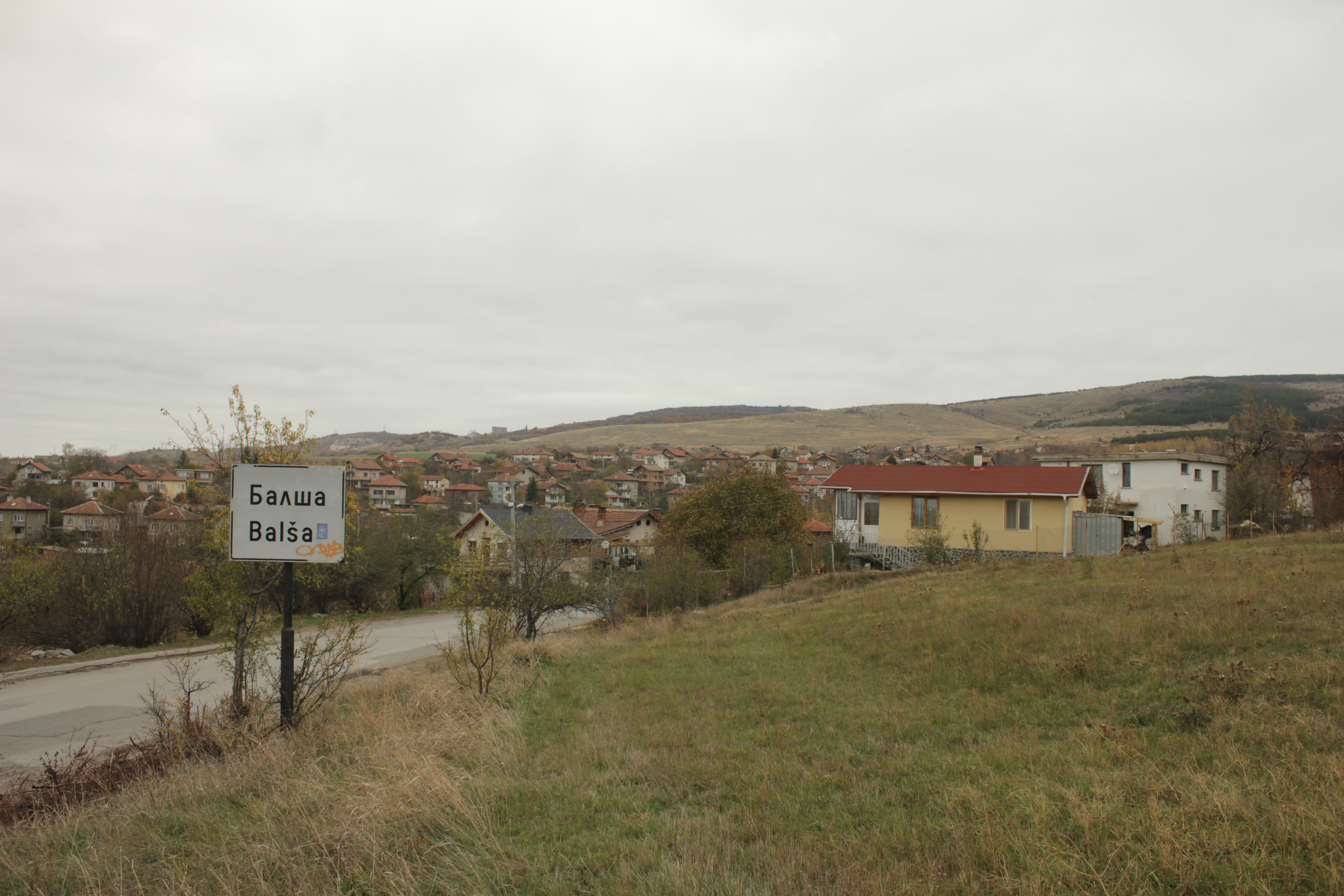
Entrance to the village
