= Sofia City Province =

Province in western Bulgaria

Sofia City Province Област София-град
- Province
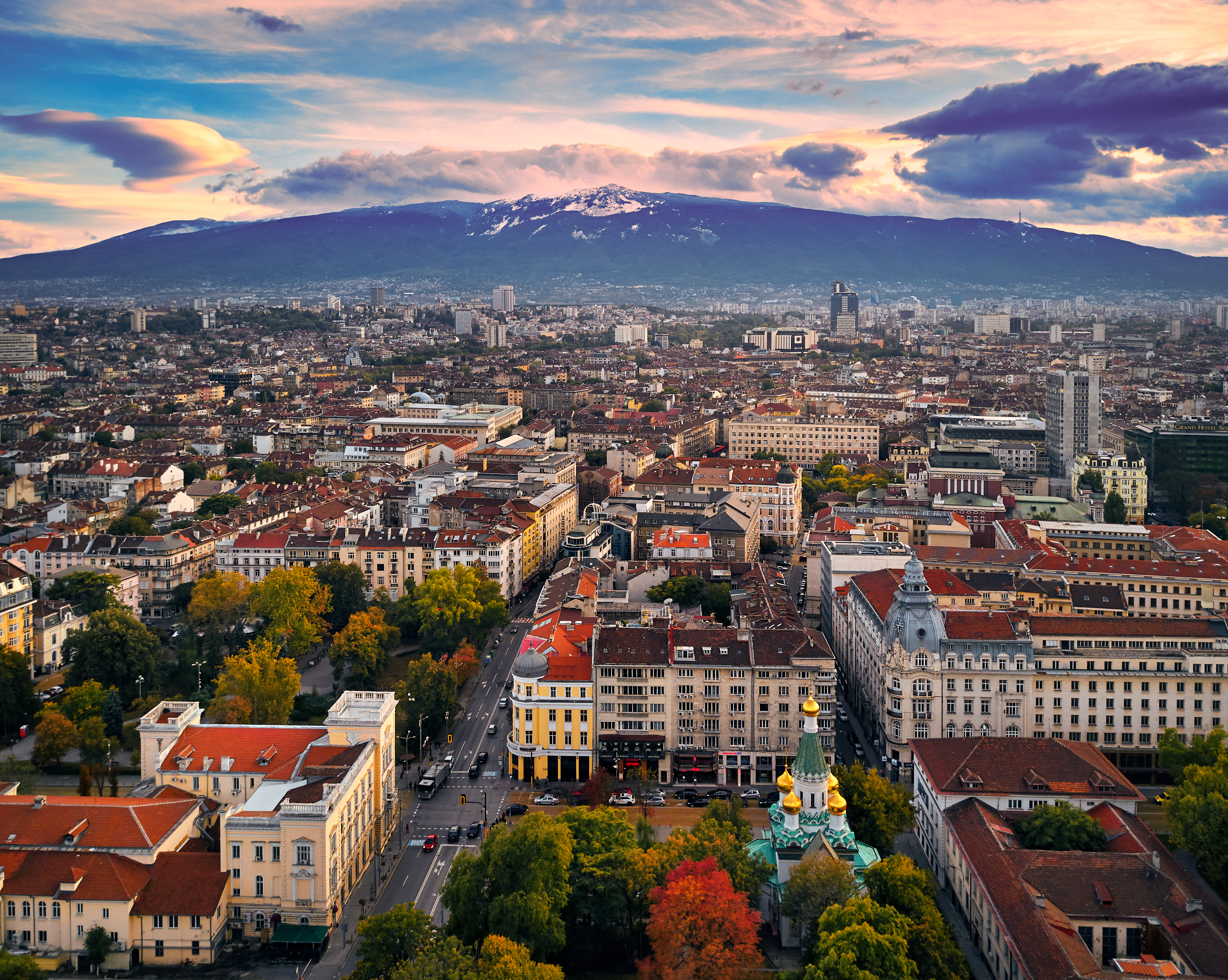

- Flag

- Location of Sofia City Province in Bulgaria
- Country: Bulgaria
- Capital: Sofia

Area
  - Total: 1,344 km^{2} (519 sq mi)

Population (September 2021)
  - Total: 1,480,830
  - Density: 1,102/km^{2} (2,854/sq mi)

GDP
  - Total: €33.259 billion (2021)
  - Per capita: €22,460 (2021)
- Time zone: UTC+2 (EET)
  - Summer (DST): UTC+3 (EEST)
- License plate: C, CA, CB
- Website: sfoblast.egov.bg

Sofia City Province (Bulgarian: Област София-град, romanized: Oblast Sofiya-grad) is a province (oblast) of western Bulgaria. Its administrative center is the city of Sofia, the capital of the country. It borders Sofia Province and Pernik Province. It consists of only one municipality – the Sofia Capital Municipality.

== Settlements ==
The province consists of one city, Sofia, three towns — Bankya, Buhovo and Novi Iskar, and 34 villages — Balsha, Bistritsa, Busmantsi, Chepintsi, Dobroslavtsi, Dolni Bogrov, Dolni Pasarel, German, Gorni Bogrov, Ivanyane, Zheleznitsa, Zhelyava, Zhiten, Kazichene, Klisura, Kokalyane, Krivina, Kubratovo, Katina, Lokorsko, Lozen, Malo Buchino, Marchaevo, Mirovyane, Mramor, Negovan, Pancharevo, Plana, Podgumer, Svetovrachene, Vladaya, Voluyak, Voynegovtsi and Yana.

== Demographics ==
Ethnic groups (2011)
Ethnic group	percent
Bulgarians	96.4%
Roma	1.6%
others and indefinable	2.0%

Historical population
Year	Pop.	±%
1946	525,710	—
1956	724,603	+37.8%
1965	905,287	+24.9%
1975	1,076,741	+18.9%
1985	1,198,615	+11.3%
1992	1,190,126	−0.7%
2001	1,173,988	−1.4%
2011	1,291,591	+10.0%
2021	1,274,290	−1.3%

Population (2011 census): 1,291,591

Ethnic groups (2011):

Identified themselves: 1,178,131

- Bulgarians: 1,136,433 (96.4%)
- Roma: 18,284 (1.6%)
- others and indefinable: 23,614 (2%)
- A further 113,460 people did not answer the question for ethnic group.

== Economy ==
In 2024 Sofia's gross metropolitan product was €28.9 billion and around € 33,500 per capita. This puts Sofia in 80th place among cities in European Union.
