= Dobroslavtsi =

Coordinates: 42°49′17″N 23°17′00″E

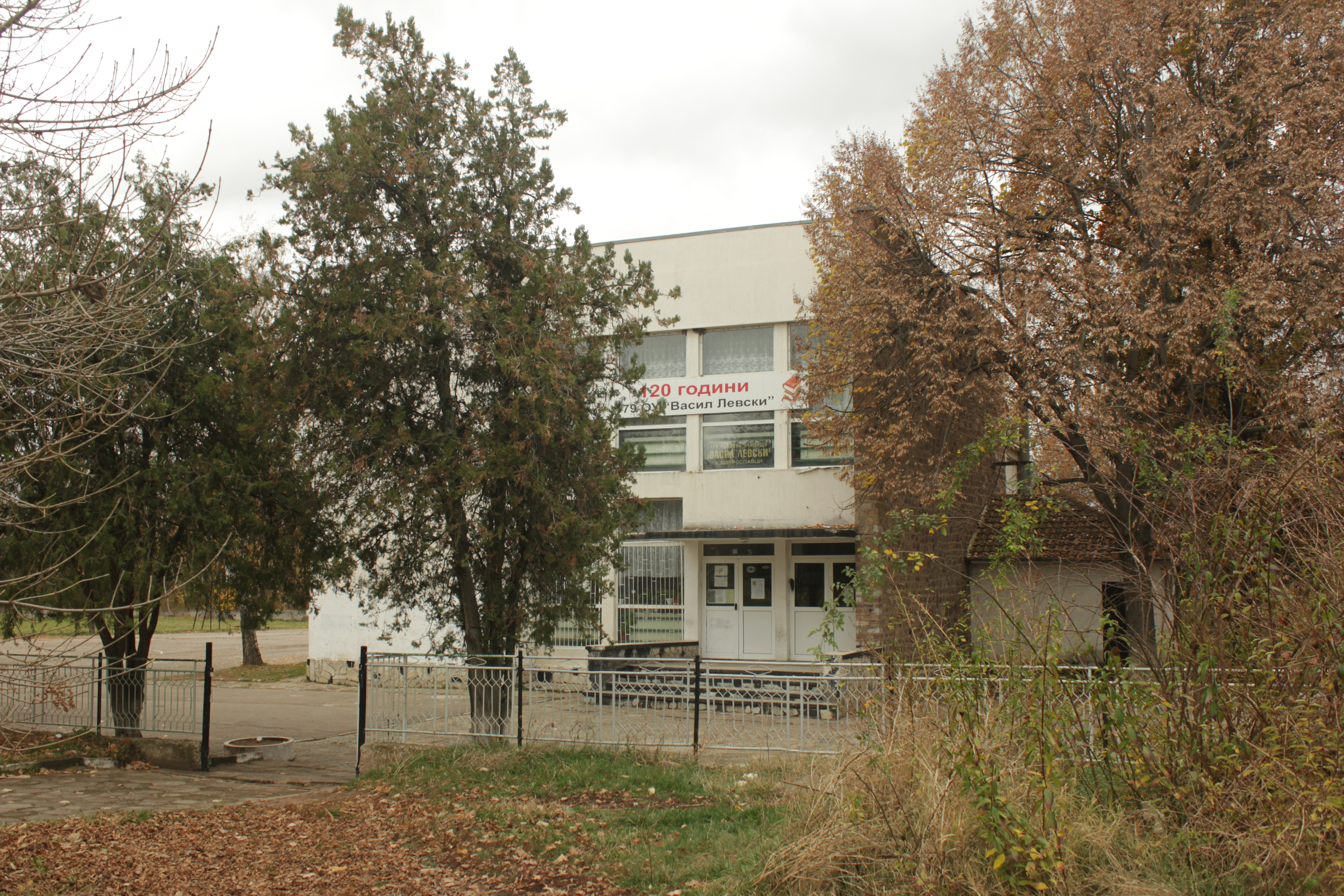
School "Vasil Levski" in Dobroslavtsi

Dobroslavtsi (Bulgarian: Доброславци, also transcribed as Dobroslavtzi or Dobroslavci) is a village (село) in western Bulgaria, located in the Sofia City Province. The village lies in the Sofia Valley. It is located 15 km (9 mi) from the city of Sofia. The former Dobroslavtsi Air Base is situated near the village.
