= Negovan, Bulgaria =

Negovan Негован
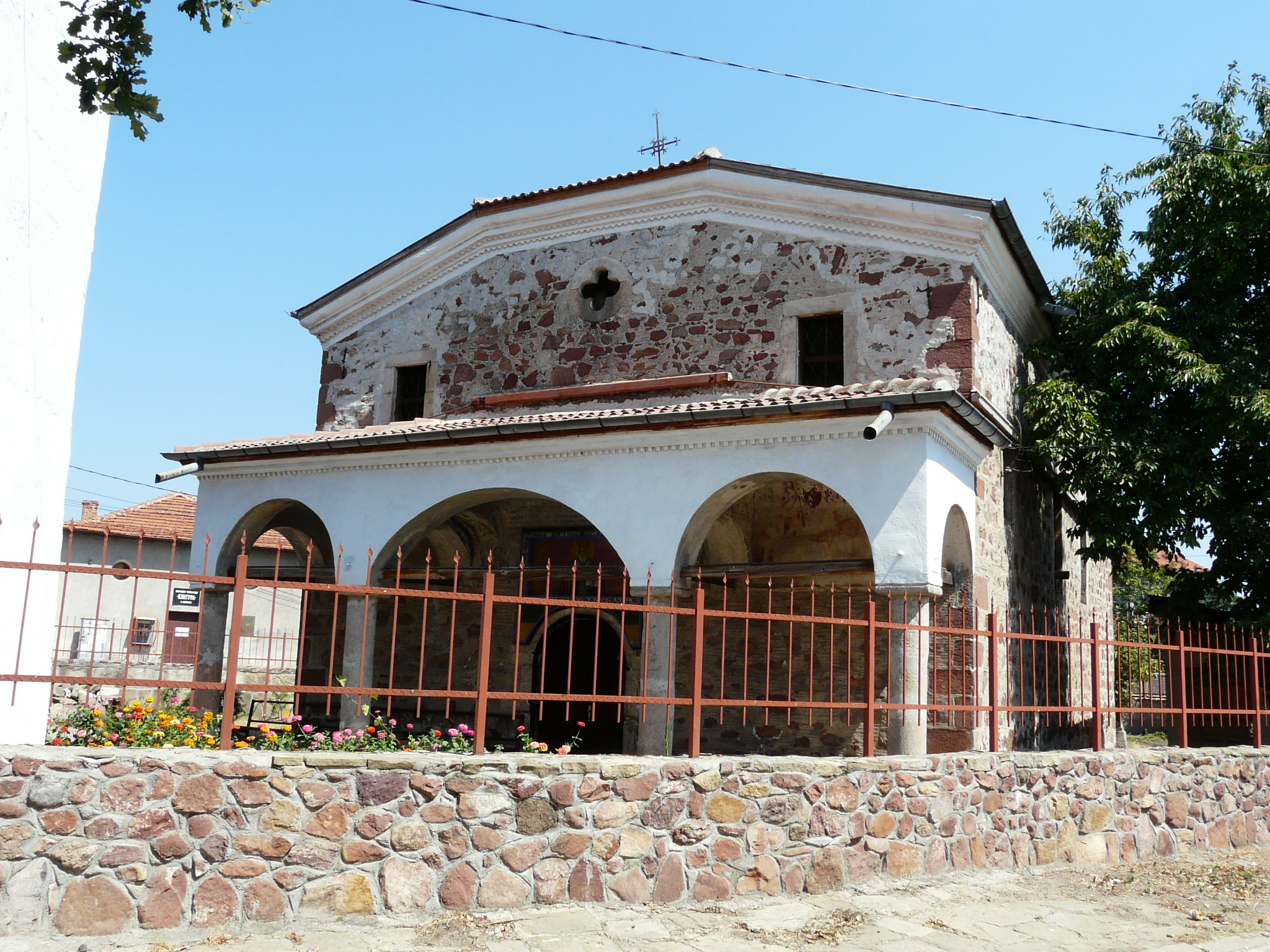
- St. Nicholas of Myra church

- Location of Negovan
- Coordinates: 42°46′N 23°25′E
- Country: Bulgaria
- Province (Oblast): Sofia City

Government
  - Mayor: Valentin Pavlov

Area
  - Total: 9.33 km^{2} (3.60 sq mi)
- Elevation: 549 m (1,801 ft)

Population (15.9.2012)
  - Total: 2 075
  - Density: 0.21/km^{2} (0.56/sq mi)
- Time zone: UTC+2 (EET)
  - Summer (DST): UTC+3 (EEST)
- Postal Code: 1222
- Area code: 02996

Negovan (Bulgarian: Негован [nɛɡoˈvan]) is a village in central western Bulgaria, part of the Capital Municipality of Sofia City Province, and is regarded as a suburban neighbourhood of Sofia.
