= Europe motorway =

Motorway in Bulgaria

Europe motorway
- Автомагистрала „Европа“
- Europe motorway highlighted in red and yellow

Route information
- Part of E80
- Length: 63.16 km (39.25 mi)
- Existed: 2025–present

Major junctions
- From: Kalotina; (Serbia)
- To: Sofia

Location
- Country: Bulgaria
- Major cities: Sofia, Kostinbrod, Slivnitsa, Dragoman

Highway system
- Highways in Bulgaria

The Europe Motorway (Bulgarian: Автомагистрала "Европа", Avtomagistrala "Evropa"), designated A6, is a fully operational motorway that links the Bulgarian capital Sofia with Serbia at the Kalotina border crossing. Spanning approximately 63 kilometers (39 mi), the motorway connects seamlessly with the Serbian A4 motorway, facilitating efficient cross-border travel and trade.

In 2018 the government changed its name from Kalotina motorway to Europe motorway, as well as merging the Northern Sofia Bypass in it and designating it A6.

== Tenders ==
The first 31.5 km of the motorway (Kalotina–Herakovo) were tendered in 2012, and the construction works were expected to begin in 2013. The route in the tendered section follows the existing major road 8/European route E80 road and also is part of Pan-European Corridor X, branch C. In October 2013 the tender procedure was cancelled due to lacking financing under the allocated for Bulgaria EU funds.

In May 2014, the section between Kalotina and Herakovo was retendered. This time it has been divided into 2 sublots, Kalotina-Dragoman and Dragoman-Herakovo. The costs are estimated at 200 million levs (102.26 million euro). Later, this tender also was cancelled.

On September 13, 2017, the sections Kalotina-Dragoman and Dragoman-Slivnitsa were put to tender; Strabag is to build the first section, GBS-Infrastructure the latter.

== Construction ==
Construction of the 17 km long Dragoman - Slivnitsa section was launched in the second half of May 2019 and was opened in November 2020 Construction of Dragoman - Kalotina section is currently ongoing. There is presently a 4-lane undivided highway between Slivnitsa and the Sofia Ring Road.

=== Exits ===
| Exit | km | Destinations | Lanes | Notes |
|---|---|---|---|---|
| | 0 | Kalotina; Serbia, | | In service |
| | 1+644 | Kalotina | | In service |
| | 13+046 | Dragoman-west | | In service |
| | 14+389 | Dragoman-east | | In service |
| | 25+850 | Slivnitsa-west | | In service |
| | 29+206.86 | Slivnitsa-east | | In service |
| | 45+540 | Kostinbrod | | In service |
| | 48+460 | Volujak | | In service |
| | 48+611 | Sofia Ring Road | | In service |
| | 51+695 | Rozhen blvd. | | In service |
| | 53+462 | Iliyantsi blvd. | | Not yet in service |
| | 57+750 | Chepinsko shose str. | | In service |
| | 59+282 | East tangent, Sofia Airport | | Not yet in service |
| | 63+611 | Sofia Ring Road | | In service |

== Northern Bypass Highway ==
Sofia Northern Bypass

The Northern Bypass Highway or Sofia Northern Speed Tangent (Bulgarian: Северна скоростна тангента, Severna Skorostna Tangenta) is a dual carriageway, grade separated road with controlled-access, designed for high speeds. The Northern Bypass has three traffic lanes and an emergency lane in each carriageway. The motorway gets around the Bulgarian capital Sofia from north to carry the transit traffic, which otherwise would pass through the city or via the Sofia Ring Road.

The Bypass is an important thoroughfare, as it connects four motorways - A1 Trakia motorway (via the Sofia ring road), A2 Hemus motorway and the A3 Struma motorway. Also, it connects 3 Pan-European corridors - IV, VIII and X.

=== Construction ===
In 2012, a tender for construction was announced. Construction works were expected to begin in 2013, but due to litigation the contract for design and build was signed in February 2014. The term for implementation of the contract is 18 months. Due to land expropriation issues, the construction works started in February 2015.

The first 13 kilometers of the motorway were opened in the end of 2015 and the remaining segment was inaugurated on 28 April 2016.

== Gallery ==
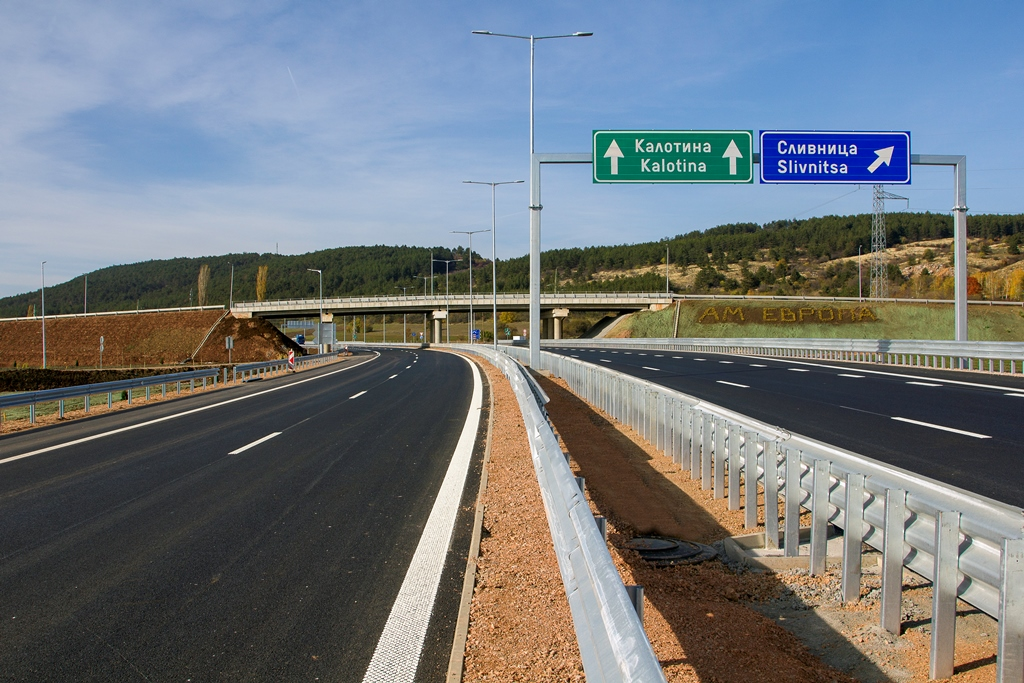
Europe motorway near Slivnitsa

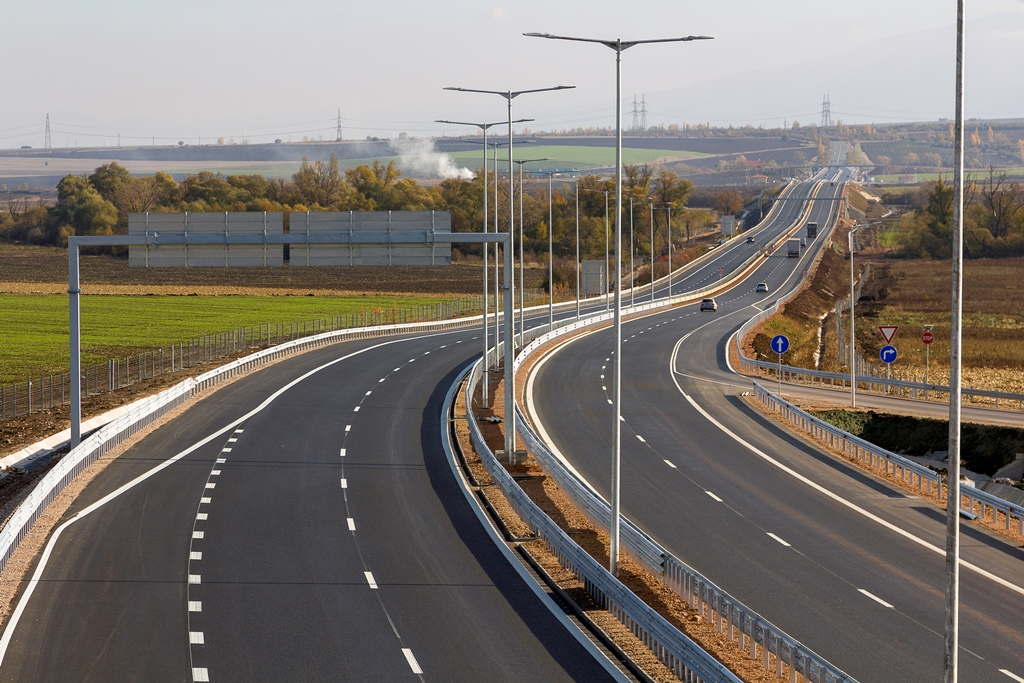
Europe motorway
