= Novi Iskar =

Novi Iskar Нови Искър
- Town
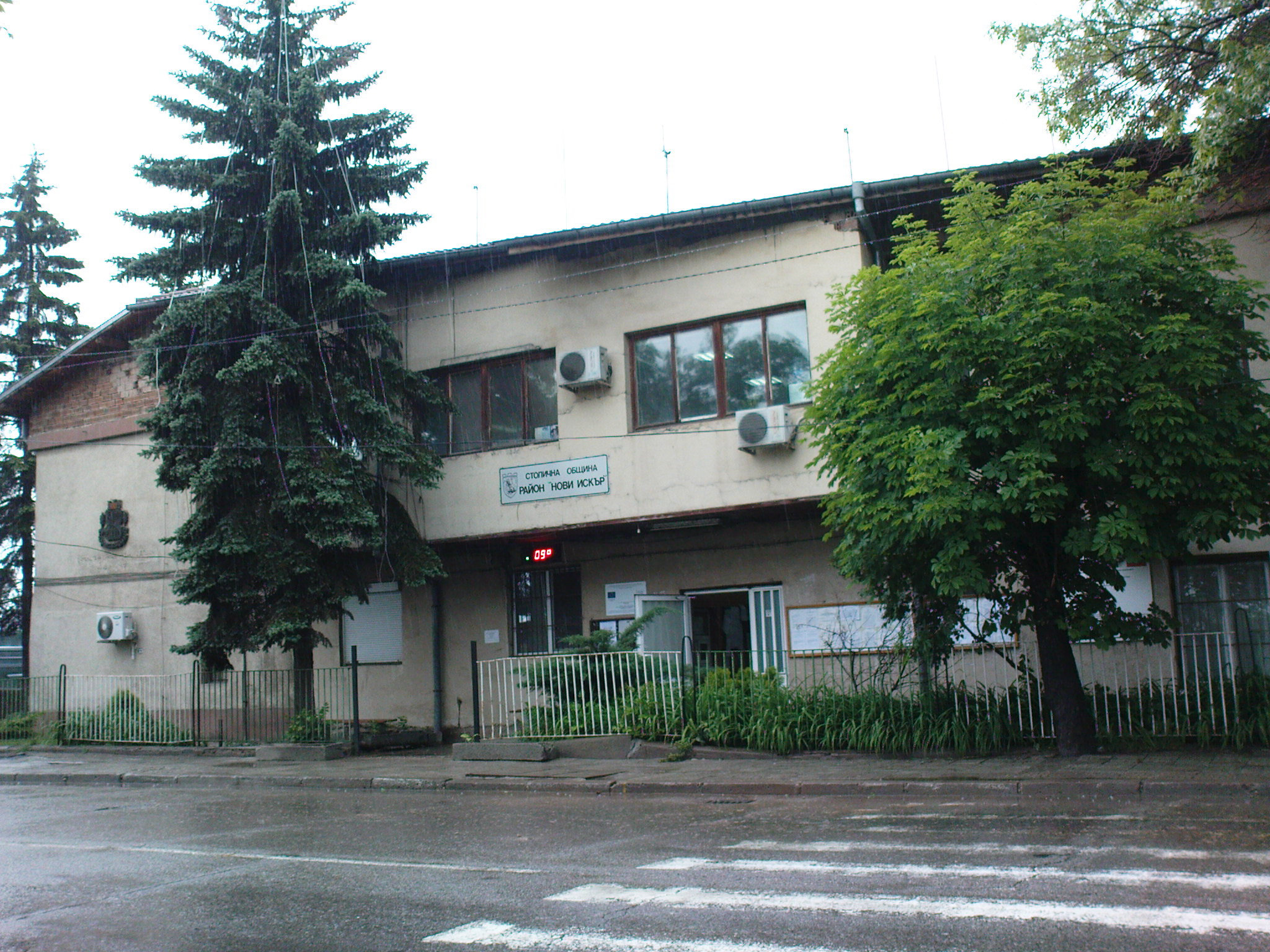

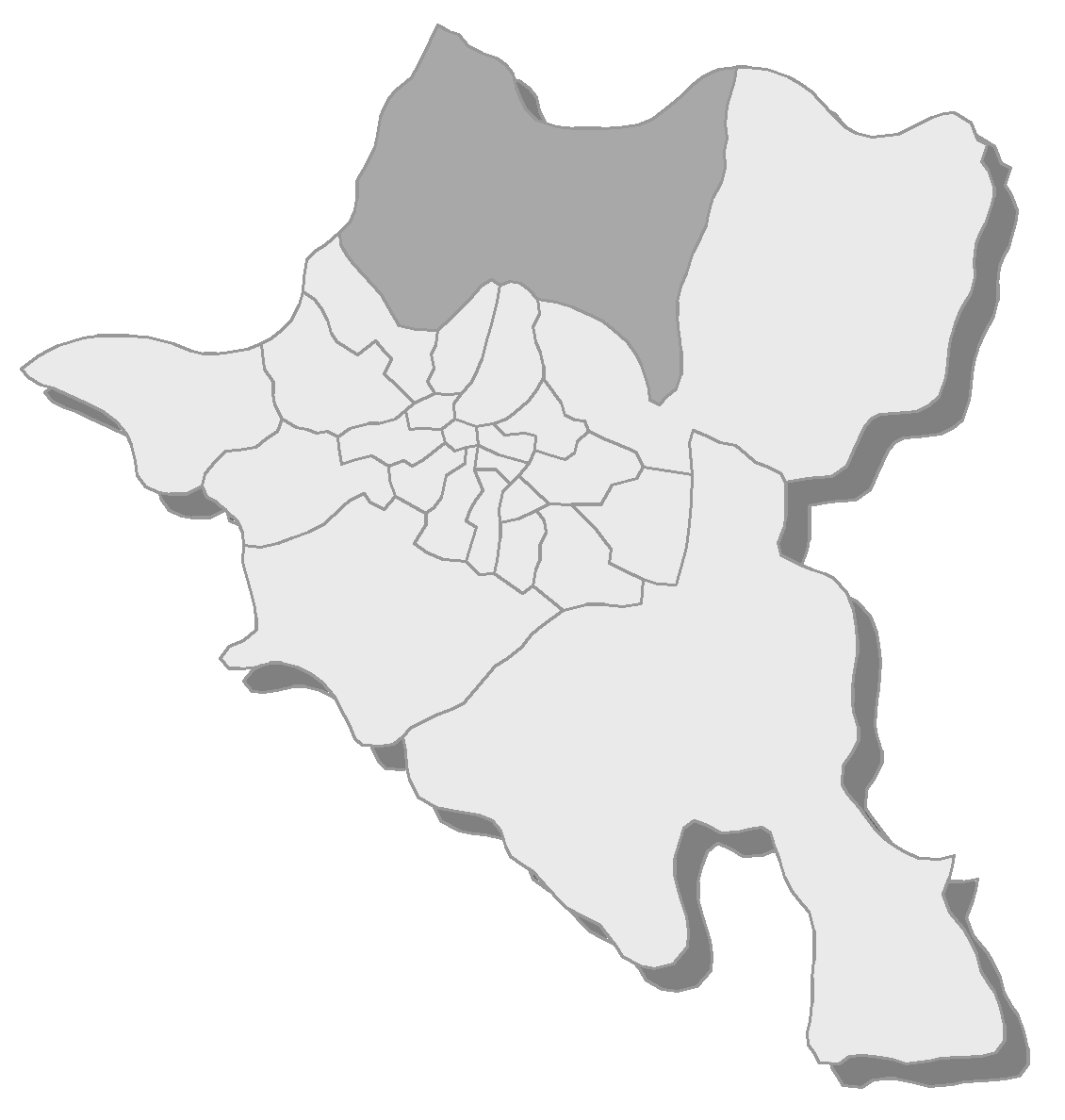
- Location of Novi Iskar

- Location of Novi Iskar
- Coordinates: 42°48′N 23°21′E
- Country: Bulgaria
- Province: Sofia City

Government
  - Mayor: Vladislav Vladimirov

Area
  - Total: 5,280 km^{2} (2,040 sq mi)
- Elevation: 509 m (1,670 ft)

Population (2020)
  - Total: 13,768
  - Density: 2.61/km^{2} (6.75/sq mi)
- Time zone: UTC+2 (EET)
  - Summer (DST): UTC+3 (EEST)
- Postal code: 1280
- Area code: 02 991
- License plate: С, СА, СВ
- Website: www.novi-iskar.bg

Novi Iskar (Bulgarian: Нови Искър [ˈnɔvi iskɐr]) is a town in Western Bulgaria, located in Sofia City Province, which is a part of the Municipality of Sofia (the capital of Bulgaria). It is often regarded as a northern suburb of Bulgarian capital Sofia and lies in the northern part of the Sofia Valley, with the Iskar Gorge beginning just north of the town.

The town of Novi Iskar was formed in May 1974 with the merging of three villages: Aleksandar Voykov, Gnilyane, and Kurilo. The village of Aleksandar Voykov was formed in 1955 when the Kumaritsa and Slavovtsi villages were merged. Initially a villa area, Izgrev is nowadays a district of the town.

Today, Novi Iskar consists of 5 districts: Slavovtsi, Kumaritsa, Kurilo, Izgrev and Gnilyane.

== Honour ==
Cape Kurilo in Snow Island, South Shetland Islands is named after the district of Kurilo.
