= Public buses in Sofia =

Bus services in Sofia, Bulgaria

Sofia Public bus system
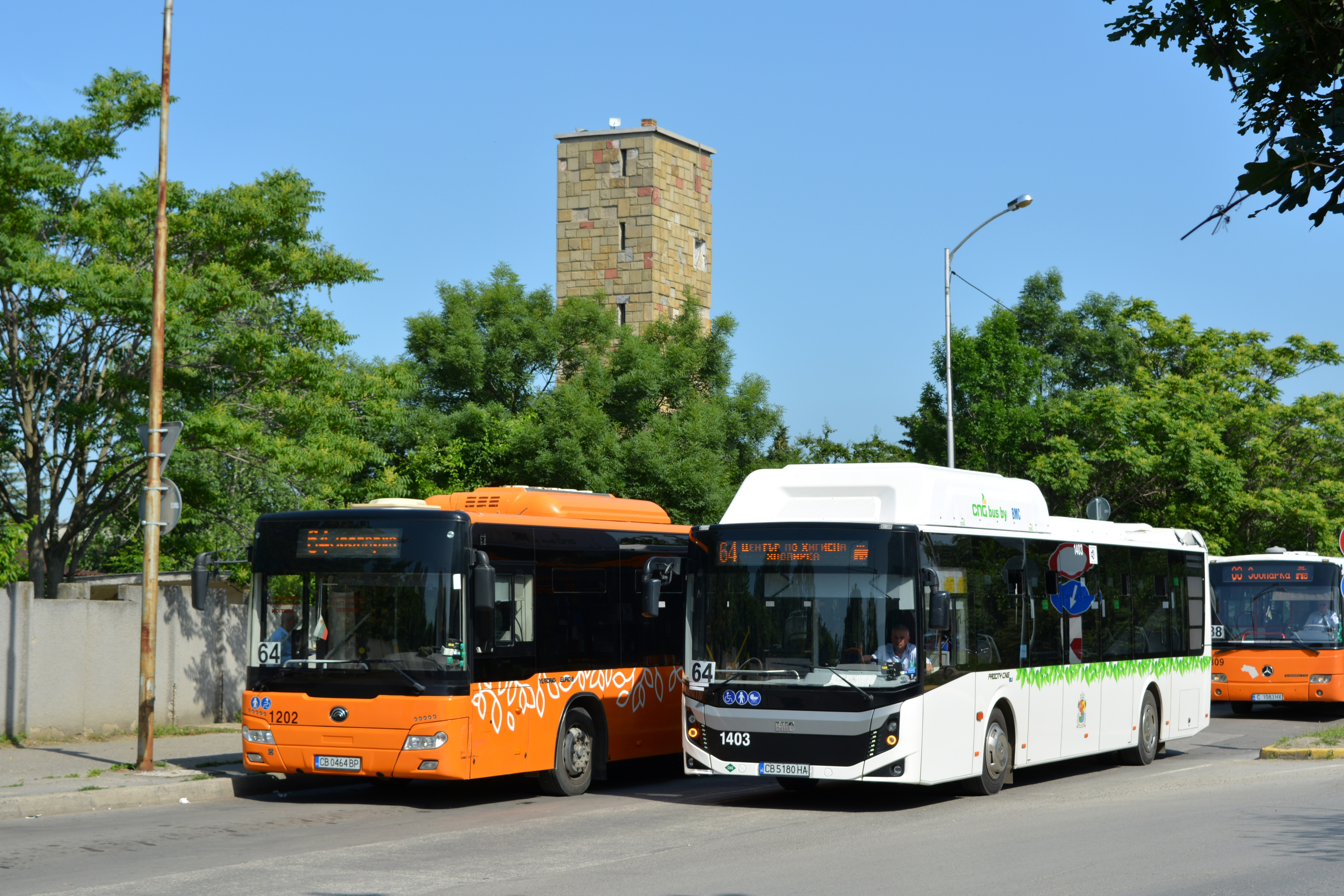
- Buses on Srebarna Street near the entrance to the Sofia Zoo

Overview
- Owner: Stolichna Municipality
- Area served: Stolichna Municipality
- Locale: Sofia, Bulgaria
- Transit type: Bus
- Number of lines: 102

Operation
- Began operation: 20 April 1935
- Operators: Sofia Bus Transport JSC; Sofia Electric Transport JSC; MTK Group

Technical
- System length: 2,380 km (1,478.9 mi)
- Average speed: 20 km/h (12 mph)

The Sofia public bus system (Bulgarian: Автобусен транспорт София) forms part of the public transport network of Sofia, the capital city of Bulgaria.

In operation since 1935, the system presently comprises 98 routes.

== History ==
The public bus transport in Sofia developed relatively late compared to the other types of transport in the city. The first operational line was opened on 20 April 1935. Soon after that six more lines were opened, bringing the total network length to 23 km.

During the communist era, the bus fleet consisted mainly of Ikarus and Bulgarian-made Chavdar buses. After the political changes in 1989, however, the fleet has gradually been modernised.

== Lines ==
Below is a list of bus lines operating in Sofia. Lines numbered 1 to 604 are normal bus lines. Lines with numbers from 800 onwards are additional bus lines. "N" index lines are night bus lines and "X" index lines are express bus lines.

As of 18 November 2026, the following bus lines in Sofia are in service:

Line	Route	Garage
1	Geo Milev Bus Station – Kokalyane/Kokalyansko Hanche	Malashevtsi
3	Gen. Gurko St. – Dolni Pasarel	Malashevtsi
4	Mladost 1 – Kokalyansko Hanche	Druzhba
5	Geo Milev Bus Station – Lozen	Malashevtsi
6	Geo Milev Bus Station – German	Iskar trolleybus depot
7	Iskar Railway Station – Verila Railway Station	Druzhba
8	German – Krivina	Druzhba
9	Iskar Motorservice Station – Gen. Gurko St.	Druzhba
X9	Aleksandar Teodorov - Balan Metro Station – Lozenets	Zemlyane
10	Busmantsi – Dimitar Milenkov	Druzhba
X10	Buxton - Mladost 1	Zemlyane
11	Geo Milev Bus Station – Ovcha Kupel 2	Zemlyane
12	Iztok Bus Station – Dolni Bogrov	MTK Group
14	Iskar Railway Station – Iztok Bus Station	Druzhba
18	Orlandovtsi Bus Station – Chepintsi Mill	MTK Group
20	Lions' Bridge Sq. – Lokorsko	MTK Group
21	Central Railway Station – Voynegovtsi	MTK Group
22	Central Railway Station – Podgumer	MTK Group
23	Orlandovtsi Bus Station – Kurilo Railway Station	Malashevtsi
24	Orlandovtsi Bus Station – Benkovski	MTK Group
26	Obelya 1 – Gnilyane	Malashevtsi
27	Kn. Maria Luisa Metro Station – Katina	MTK Group
28	Lokorsko – Mramor	Malashevtsi
29	Sofia-North Railway Station – Balsha	MTK Group
30	Obelya 1 – Balsha	MTK Group
31	Obelya 1 – Golyanovtsi	MTK Group
42	Lyulin 8 – Mihaylovo	Zemlyane
X43	St. Alexander Nevsky Square – Bankya Bus Station	Malashevtsi
44	Bankya Bus Station – Ivanyane	Zemlyane
46	Bankya Bus Station – St. Petka Paraskeva Monastery	Zemlyane
47	Slivnitsa Metro Station – Gradoman	Zemlyane
49	Slivnitsa Metro Station – Klisura	Zemlyane
54	Slivnitsa Metro Station – Kalotina Junction	Zemlyane
56	Vardar Metro Station – Malo Buchino	Zemlyane
58	Knyazhevo Bus Station – Vladaya	Zemlyane
59	Moesia Metro Station – Marchaevo	Zemlyane
60	Kn. Maria Luisa Boulevard – Ovcha Kupel 2	Nadezhda trolleybus depot
61	Cherni Vrah Boulevard – The Golden Bridges	Zemlyane
63	Tsar Boris III Blvd – The Golden Bridges	Zemlyane
64	Sofia Zoo – Centre of Hygiene	Zemlyane
65	Boyana Church – Krasno Selo	Zemlyane
66	Sofia Zoo – Moreni Hotel	Zemlyane
67	Sofia Seminary – Simeonovo	Druzhba
68	Sofia Zoo – Simeonovo	Malashevtsi
69	National Oncology Hospital – Tsareva Mahala	Druzhba
70	National Oncology Hospital – Plana	Druzhba
72	Pliska Hotel – Zapaden Park	Malashevtsi
73	Ovcha Kupel 2 – Mladost 2	Iskar / Nadezhda trolleybus depots
74	Central Railway Station – Gotse Delchev	Nadezhda trolleybus depot
75	Geo Milev Bus Station – Eagles' Bridge	Druzhba
76	Mladost 4 – Gotse Delchev	Druzhba
77	Central Railway Station – Zapaden Park	Zemlyane
78	Central Railway Station – Vrazhdebna	Malashevtsi
79	Hristo Botev – Stind	Malashevtsi
81	Northern Industrial Zone – Ivanyane	MTK Group
82	Central Railway Station – Lyulin 5	Malashevtsi
83	Sofia Zoo – Hyundai Bulgaria	Zemlyane
84	Sofia Airport T2/T1 – Gen. Gurko St.	Zemlyane
85	Hadzhi Dimitar – Vrabnitsa 2	Malashevtsi
86	Svoboda – Malashevtsi Bus Depot	MTK Group
88	Sofia Zoo – Druzhba 2	Druzhba
90	Malashevtsi Bus Depot – Buhovo	MTK Group
94	Sofia University – Students' Town	Malashevtsi
98	Sofia Zoo – Zheleznitsa	Malashevtsi
100	Benkovski – Road Building Equipment	Malashevtsi
101	Central Railway Station – Fondovi Zhilishta	Malashevtsi
102	Ovcha Kupel 2 – Students' Town	Zemlyane
103	Ovcha Kupel Bus Station – Lyulin Villa Zone	Zemlyane
107	Ovcha Kupel – Karpuzitsa	Zemlyane
108	Lyulin 5 – Hyundai Bulgaria	Zemlyane
111	Mladost 1 – Lyulin 1,2	Zemlyane
117	Iztok Bus Station – Buhovo	MTK Group
118	Iztok Bus Station – Zhelyava	MTK Group
119	Iztok Bus Station – Botunets	MTK Group
120	Sofia Zoo – Levski G	Malashevtsi
123	Geo Milev Bus Station – Aerial Lift Simeonovo	Iskar trolleybus depot
150	Obelya 1 – Voluyak	Malashevtsi
204	Druzhba 2 – Gotse Delchev	Druzhba
213	Central Railway Station – Mladost 4	Druzhba
260	Gorna Banya – Prague Blvd	Zemlyane
280	Students' Town – Sofia University	Malashevtsi
285	Hadzhi Dimitar – Vrabnitsa	Malashevtsi
288	Geo Milev Bus Station - Vitosha Metro Station	Iskar trolleybus depot
304	National Historical Museum – Druzhba 2	Zemlyane
305	Central Railway Station – Peifil Culinary Factory	Druzhba
309	Lyulin 1,2 – Iliyantsi Blvd underpass	Malashevtsi
310	Lyulin 5 – Stochna Gara Sq.	Malashevtsi
314	Mladost 2 – Bistritsa	Druzhba
404	Central Railway Station – Druzhba Bus Depot	Druzhba
413	Sofia-North Railway Station – Technopolis Mladost 4 Qr.	Druzhba
604	Iskar Railway Station – Pirogov Hospital	Druzhba
801	Manastirski Livadi – Krasno Selo	Nadezhda
802	Gorna Banya Metro Station – Gorna Banya Metro Station	Zemlyane
803	Gorna Banya Metro Station – Lyulin Villa Zone	Zemlyane
804	Gorna Banya Metro Station – Sred Selo Square	Zemlyane
805	Students' Town – Vitosha Metro Station	Zemlyane

=== Night bus service ===
Sofia has a night bus service. It was launched by Sofia Urban Mobility Center on an experimental basis from 7 April 2018 until 31 December 2018. Tickets for the night bus can be obtained solely from conductors on the bus, and not from the driver, machines or other public transport ticket sale points. Tickets for the night bus cost 1 EUR compared to the daytime price of 0.80 EUR. Knyaz Alexander Square is used as the site of a transfer location where all night bus lines meet and passengers can switch lines.

Four routes are included and operated from 23:30 until 04:20 at intervals of 1 hour. The night bus service was closed due to COVID-19. In November of 2023, the N1 and N2 lines were re-established, with the rest of the network being brought back in December of the same year, but with changed routes:

Line	Route	Garage
N1	Lyulin 1, 2 – Mladost 4	Malashevtsi
N2	Obelya – Students' Town	Malashevtsi
N3	Ovcha Kupel 2 – Levski G	Zemlyane
N4	Gotse Delchev – Druzhba 2	Druzhba

== Fleet ==
=== Current fleet ===
Sofia Bus Transport

Quantity	Manufacturer	Type	Photo
60	BMC	Procity CNG	
132	Yutong	ZK6126HGA	
186	MAN	Lion´s City G CNG A23	
15	Mercedes-Benz	Intouro	
35	Mercedes-Benz	Conecto LF	
29	BMC	Belde 220-SLF	
18	Mercedes-Benz	O345 Conecto	
45	Mercedes-Benz	O345 Conecto G	
1	Mercedes-Benz	O345S	
1	Mercedes-Benz	O345G	
13	MAN	SG262	

Sofia Electric Transport

Quantity	Manufacturer	Type	Photo
53	Higer	KLQ6125GEV3 Chariot Ebus	
20	Yutong	E12LF	

MTK Group

Quantity	Manufacturer	Type	Photo
66	BMC	Procity CNG	

=== Heritage fleet ===
Built	Manufacturer	Type	Photo
1983	MAN	SD200	
1988	Ikarus	280	
1996	Chavdar	141	

== See also ==
- Sofia Metro
- Sofia Public Transport
- Sofia Tramway
- Trolleybuses in Sofia
