= Yana, Sofia City Province =

Yana
- Village
- Location within Bulgaria
- Coordinates: 42°43′35.51″N 23°33′19.62″E
- Country: Bulgaria
- Province: Sofia City
- Municipality: Stolichna Municipality
- Elevation: 618 m (2,028 ft)

Population (2024)
  - Total: 1,189
- Time zone: UTC+2 (EET)
  - Summer (DST): UTC+3 (EEST)
- Postal code: 1805

Yana (Bulgarian: Яна) is a village in Kremikovtsi district of the Bulgarian capital Sofia. As of 2024 it has 1,189 inhabitants.

== Geography ==
The village is situated at an altitude of 618 m in the eastern part of the Sofia Valley. It lies 18 km east of the Sofia city center and 3 km south of the town of Buhovo.

Administratively, Yana is part of the Kremikovtsi district of Stolichna Municipality in the northeastern part of the Sofia City Province. It has a territory of 13.074 km^{2}. Situated adjacent to the former Kremikovtsi steel plant, the closest settlements are the town of Buhovo to the north and the villages of Zhelyava to the northeast and Gorni Bogrov to the southwest.

== Transport ==
Along with the neighbouring settlements, Yana has excellent transport connectivity, situated along the first class I-1 road Vidin–Sofia–Blagoevgrad–Kulata next to a junction with the Hemus motorway (A2) named after the village. Yana is served by two bus lines of the Sofia Public Transport, which connect it to the Sofia Metro. There is a railway station.

== History and culture ==
During the battle of Sofia of the Russo-Turkish War of 1877–1878 the Russian army camped at the village. The Church of St Ana dates from 1734. The medieval Church of Holy Trinity, whose architecture was similar to the Church of Saint John the Baptist in Nesebar, was destroyed by the Communist authorities in 1948. The local cultural center, known in Bulgarian as a chitalishte, was founded in 1926.

== Economy ==
There is an industrial zone in the village with several factories. A waste processing plant with a capacity of 410,000 tonnes of mixed waste per year was inaugurated near Yana in 2015. It includes a mechanical-biological treatment plant, and bio-waste and green waste composting plants, located at two different sites within the facility.
