= Zhelyava =

- Village
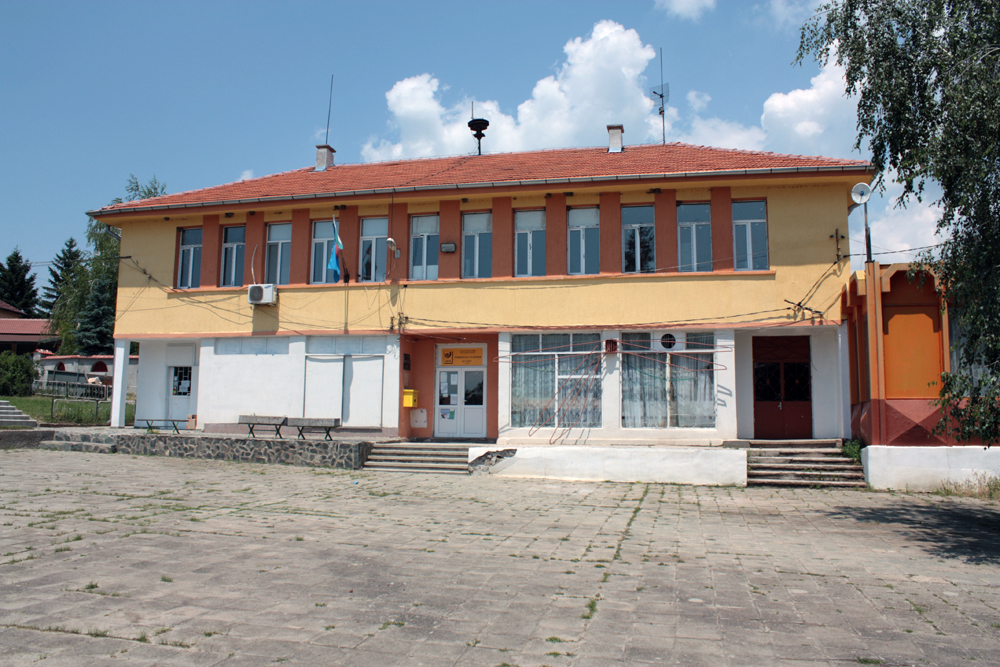

- Location within Bulgaria
- Coordinates: 42°45′0″N 23°36′0″E
- Country: Bulgaria
- Province: Sofia City
- Municipality: Stolichna Municipality
- Elevation: 709 m (2,326 ft)

Population (2024)
  - Total: 439
- Time zone: UTC+2 (EET)
  - Summer (DST): UTC+3 (EEST)
- Postal code: 1807

Zhelyava (Bulgarian: Желява) is a village in Kremikovtsi district of the Bulgarian capital Sofia. As of 2024 it has 439 inhabitants.

== Geography ==
The village is situated at an altitude of 709 m on the southern slopes of the Balkan Mountains facing the Sofia Valley and is the starting point of trails leading to the summit of Murgash (1,687 m). It lies 29 km northeast of Sofia.

Administratively, Zhelyava is part of the Kremikovtsi district of Stolichna Municipality in the northeastern part of the Sofia City Province. It has a territory of 44.967 km^{2}. Situated adjacent to the former Kremikovtsi steel plant, the closest settlements are the villages of Eleshnitsa to the east and Yana to the southwest. It is situated about a kilometer north of the Hemus motorway (A2) and the first class I-1 road Vidin–Sofia–Blagoevgrad–Kulata. Zhelyava is served by a bus line of the Sofia Public Transport.

== History and culture ==
The area around the village has been populated since antiquity. There are remains of an ancient Thracian mound, a medieval settlement, and monasteries. It fell to the Ottomans in the aftermath of the Bulgarian–Ottoman wars of the 14th century and was mentioned in an Ottoman document of 1420. During the Bulgarian National Revival of the 18th–19th centuries Zhelyava was a center of economic, cultural and political activity. A revolutionary committee was established there in 1872.

The Church of St Nicolas was constructed in 1844. There are two chapels, named after St Petka of Tarnovo and Virgin Mary. The local cultural center, known in Bulgarian as a chitalishte, was founded in 1929, and named after the summit of Murgash.

== People ==
- Todoraki Peshov, first elected mayor of Sofia

== Gallery ==
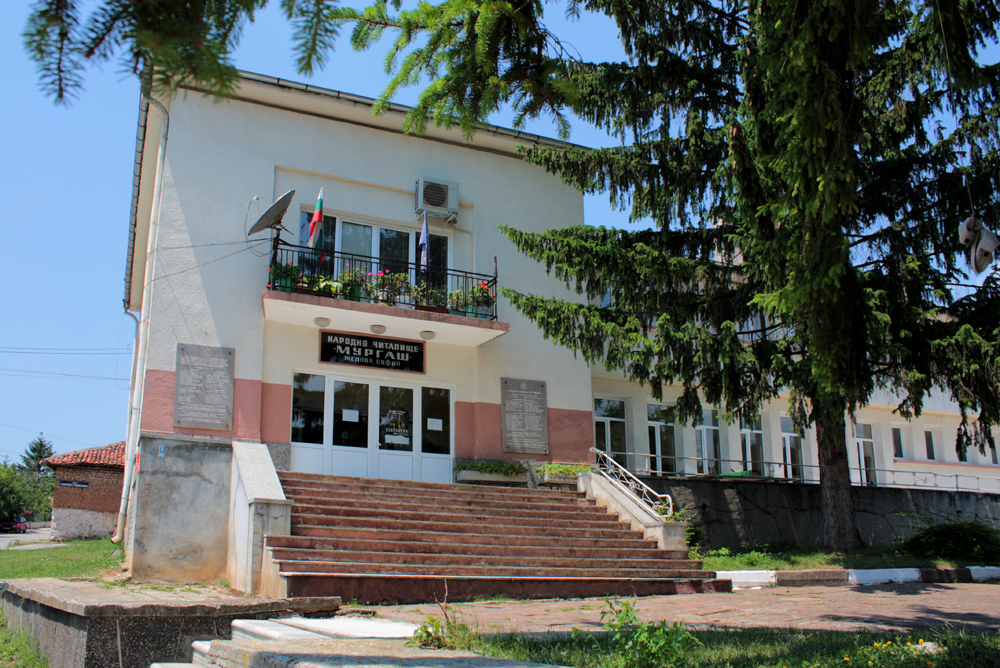
Chitalishte Murgash

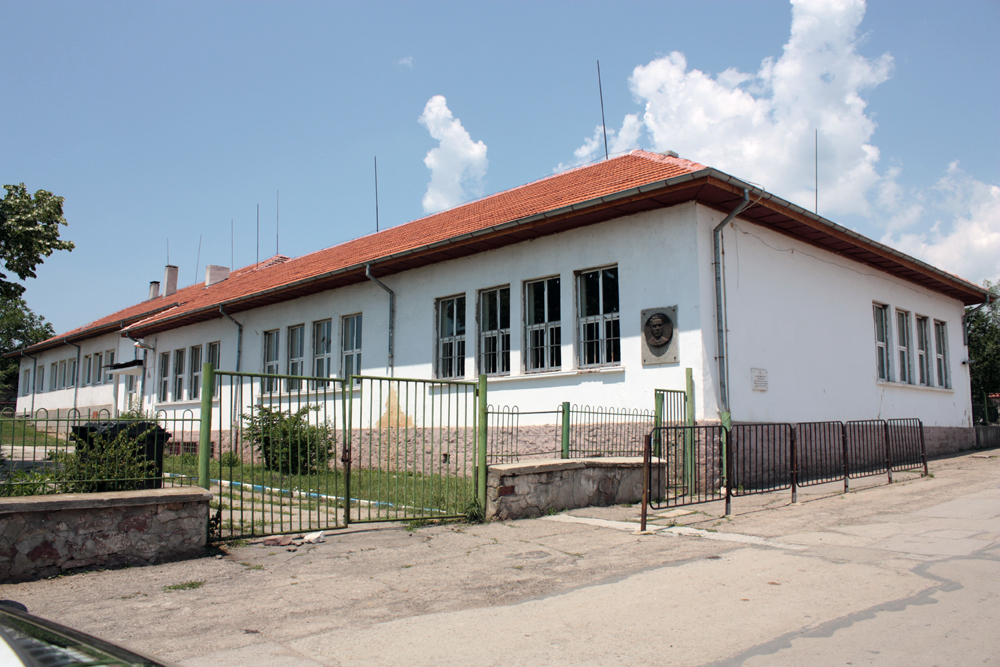
The school

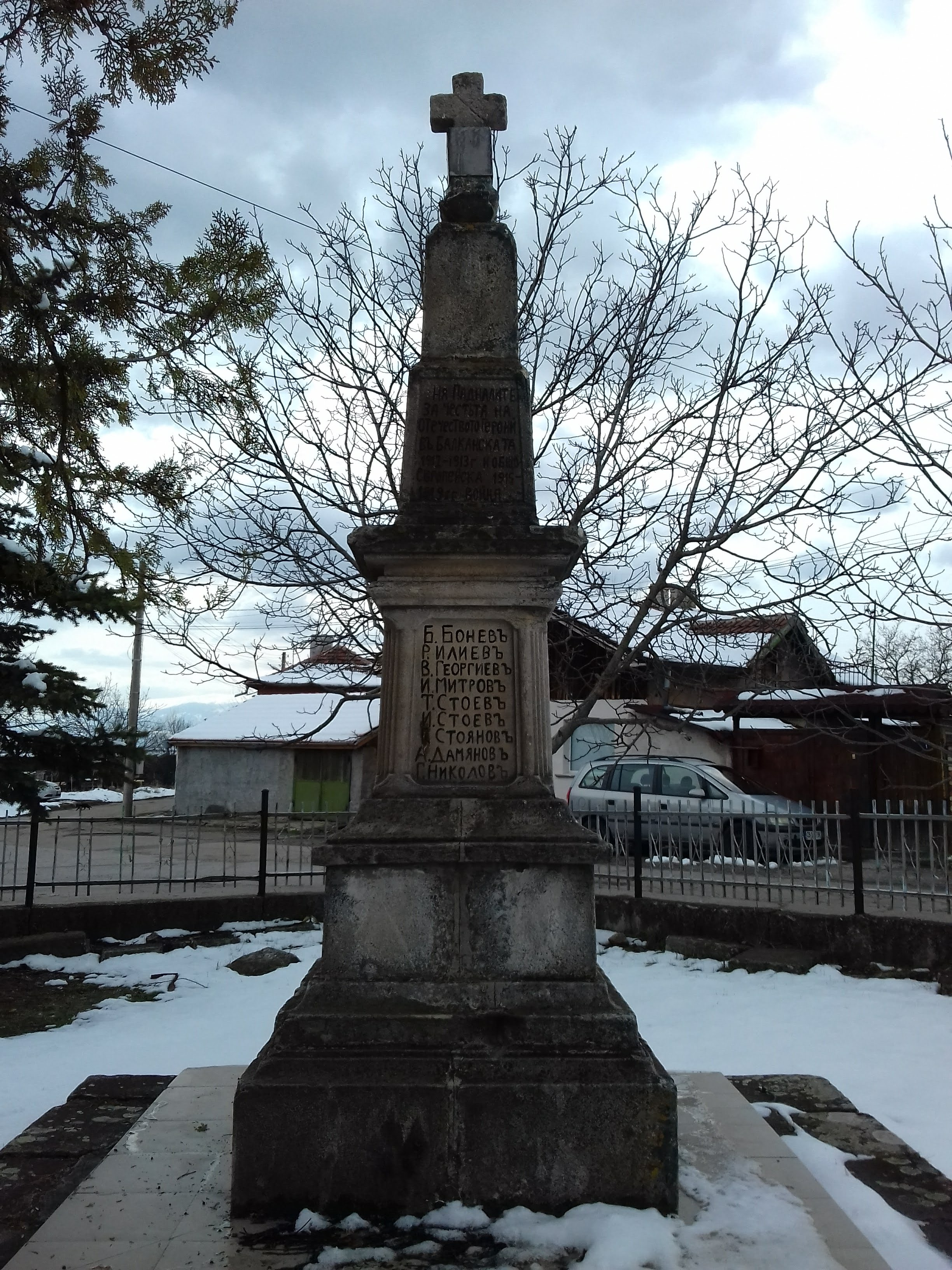
War monument
