= Dolni Bogrov =

- Village
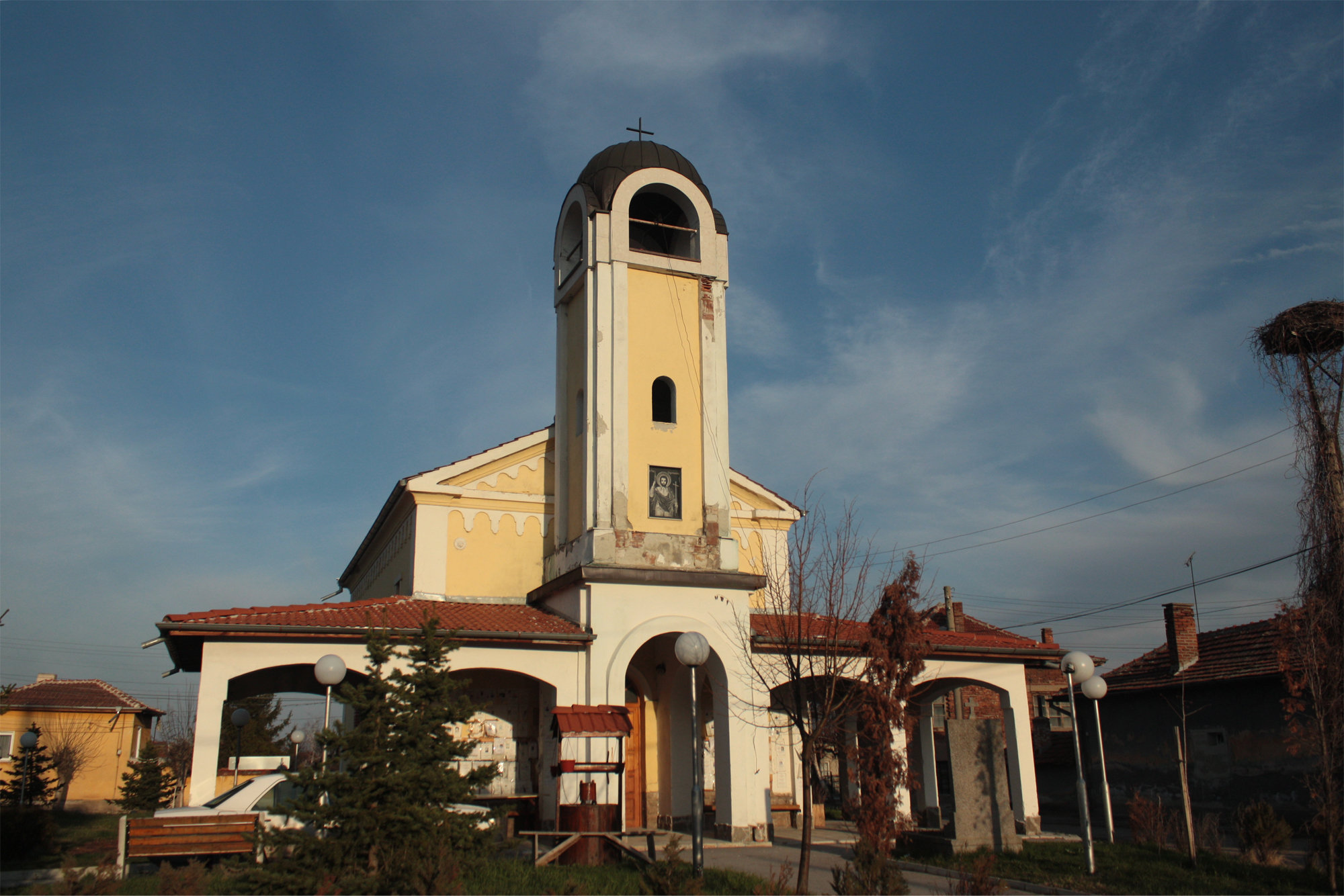

- Location within Bulgaria
- Coordinates: 42°42′0″N 23°30′0″E
- Country: Bulgaria
- Province: Sofia City
- Municipality: Stolichna Municipality
- Elevation: 528 m (1,732 ft)

Population (2024)
  - Total: 1,229
- Time zone: UTC+2 (EET)
  - Summer (DST): UTC+3 (EEST)
- Postal code: 1855

Dolni Bogrov (Bulgarian: Долни Богров) is a village in Kremikovtsi district of the Bulgarian capital Sofia, located some 15 km east of the city center. As of 2024 it has 1,229 inhabitants.

== Geography ==
The village is situated at an altitude of 528 m in the eastern part of the Sofia Valley on the river Lesnovska reka, a right tributary of the Iskar. There is a mineral spring with a temperature of 37 °С. It falls within the transitional continental climatic zone. The soils are alluvial.

Administratively, Dolni Bogrov is part of the Kremikovtsi district of Stolichna Municipality in the northeastern part of the Sofia City Province. It has a territory of 15.525 km^{2}. The closest settlements are the villages of Gorni Bogrov to the northeast, Musachevo to the east, Ravno Pole to the southeast, and Krivina to the southwest.

== Transport ==
Dolni Bogrov has excellent transport connectivity, situated along the first class I-6 road Gyueshevo–Sofia–Burgas some two kilometers east of the Sofia Ring Road and about a kilometer from the starting point of the major Hemus motorway (A2), leading to the port city of Varna. The village is served by two bus lines of the Sofia Public Transport, which connect it to the Sofia Metro.

== History and culture ==
The village was first mentioned it Ottoman documents from 1452. The Church of St Theodore Stratilat was constructed in 1895 and the decorated by Bulgarian woodcarvers from the town of Debar. The local cultural center, known in Bulgarian as a chitalishte, was founded in 1927 and is named after the Saints Cyril and Methodius.
