= Gorni Bogrov =

- Village
- Aerial view of Gorni Bogrov

- Location within Bulgaria
- Coordinates: 42°43′0″N 23°32′0″E
- Country: Bulgaria
- Province: Sofia City
- Municipality: Stolichna Municipality
- Elevation: 565 m (1,854 ft)

Population (2024)
  - Total: 1,173
- Time zone: UTC+2 (EET)
  - Summer (DST): UTC+3 (EEST)
- Postal code: 1806

Gorni Bogrov (Bulgarian: Горни Богров) is a village in Kremikovtsi district of the Bulgarian capital Sofia, located 18 km east of the city center. As of 2024 it has 1,173 inhabitants.

== Geography ==
The village is situated at an altitude of 565 m in the eastern part of the Sofia Valley, about a kilometer northeast of the river Lesnovska reka, a right tributary of the Iskar. It falls within the transitional continental climatic zone. The soils are cinnamon forest.

Administratively, Gorni Bogrov is part of the Kremikovtsi district of Stolichna Municipality in the northeastern part of the Sofia City Province. It has a territory of 15.876 km^{2}. The closest settlements are the Botunets neightbourhood of Sofia to the northwest, as well as the villages of Yana to the northeast and Dolni Bogrov to the southwest.

== Transport ==
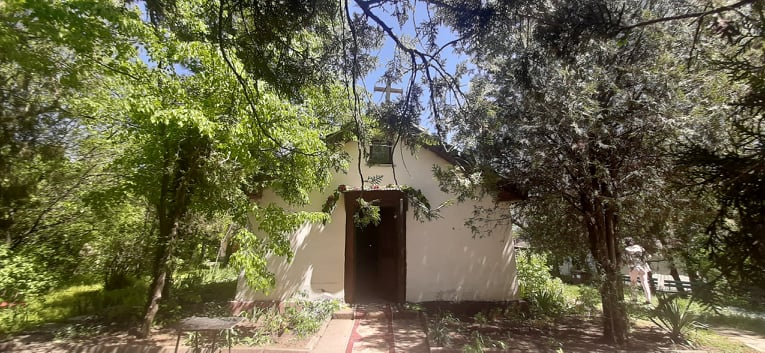
The church of Gorni Bogrov Monastery

Gorni Bogrov has excellent transport connectivity, situated along the first class I-1 road Vidin–Sofia–Blagoevgrad–Kulata next to a junction with the Hemus motorway (A2). Just south of the village is another junction of the I-1 with the first class I-6 road Gyueshevo–Sofia–Burgas. The village is served by two bus lines of the Sofia Public Transport, which connect it to the Sofia Metro. There is a railway station in the neighbouring village of Yana.

== History and culture ==
Some of the decisive actions in the battle of Sofia during the Russo-Turkish War of 1877–1878 took place near Gorni Bogrov. There are two Christian temples, the Monastery of St George and the Church of St Charalambos. The latter was constructed in 1882. The local cultural center, known in Bulgarian as a chitalishte, was founded in 1927.

== People ==
- Yordanka Donkova, hurdling athlete
