= Battle of Sofia =

1877–78 battle of the Russo-Turkish War (1877–1878)

- Part of Russo-Turkish War (1877–1878)
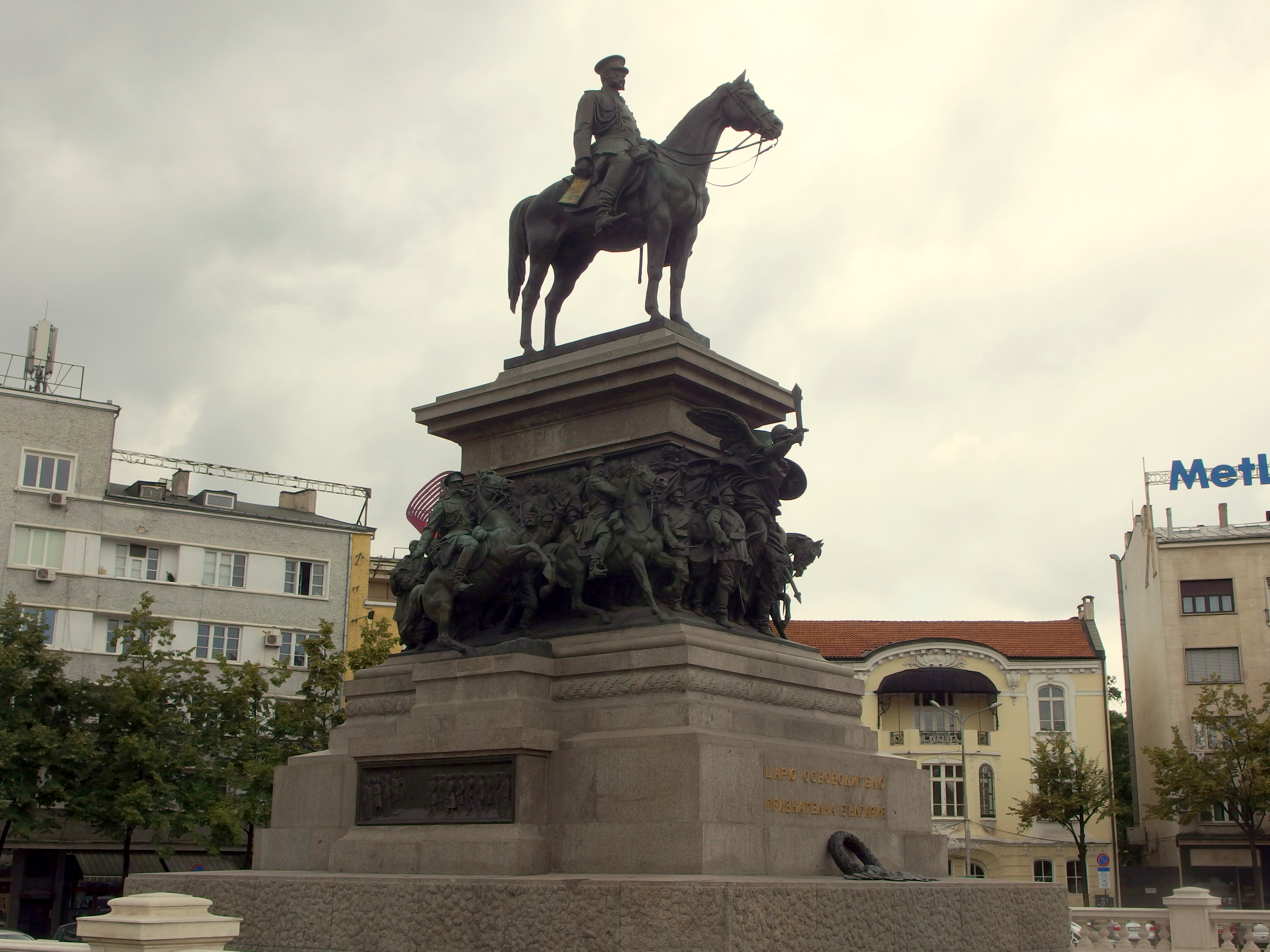
- The Monument to the Tsar Liberator in Sofia
Date	31 December 1877 – 4 January 1878
Location	Sofia, Sanjak of Sofia, Danube Vilayet, Ottoman Empire (now Bulgaria)
Result	Russian victory
Territorial changes	Liberation of Sofia from Turkish rule

Belligerents
Russian Empire	Ottoman Empire

Commanders and leaders
Lt Gen Iosif Gurko; Lt Gen Nikolay Velyaminov; Major General Otton Rauch	Osman Nuri Pasha

Units involved
Gurko's Western Squad	Orhaniye Army

Strength
23,000	21,000

Casualties and losses
400 killed 579 wounded	980 killed 430 wounded

The Battle of Sofia (Bulgarian: Битката при София) was the culmination of Russian General Iosif Gurko's Western Squad for the defeat of the Orhaniye army in the Russo-Turkish War (1877–1878). It led to the liberation of Sofia from Turkish rule.

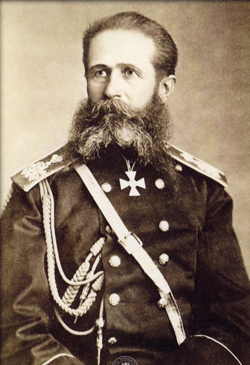
Gen. Iosif Gurko

== Battle of Sofia ==
=== Location of power ===
In early January 1878, the West army group Gurko successfully crossed the Balkan Mountains. Parts of the group was to focus on Yana village. The Orhaniye Ottoman army after the Battle of Tashkessen retired to the Sofia area. Western group Gurko passed to operation Orhaniye to defeat the Ottoman army, according to the plan for final action in the war. General Iosif Gurko said: "Probably we would not have crossed the mountain, were it not for these silent and strong Bulgarians who brought us bread and hot food. They prompted us to remove the horses to harness their oxen to the guns and so went the first party to pass through snowdrifts and freezing cold."

Part of the forces of the West group Gurko with 20,000 soldiers and 46 cannons commanded by Major General Otto Rauch were directed into Sofia field. They were grouped into two columns: the right column of Lieutenant General Nikolai Velyaminov attacked from the north, and the left column of Major General Otto Rauch from the east. The opponent was Sofia's Ottoman holding force, 15,000 soldiers under Commander Osman Nuri Pasha, who occupied the approaches to the city and fortifications around the city.

=== Battle of Dolni Bogrov ===
On 19/31 December (Note: For the duplicated dates in this article, see Old Style and New Style dates) Ottoman forces (5000 soldiers) were directed against the column of Lieutenant Velyaminov (4200 soldiers). The Ottomans burned Dolni Bogrov and Botunets villages. This led to a gun battle. The next day, December 20 / January 1, attacking frontally, they made two attacks and attempt to attack the Russian flanks. After Russian counterattack the Ottomans abandoned Dolni Bogrov and by nightfall fled and were pursued.

=== Fight at Vrazhdebna ===
On December 21 / January 2 the column of Major General Rauch came from Sarantsi village and headed to Gorni Bogrov. They crossed the river Iskar, causing a skirmish at the bridge near Vrazhedbna. The opposing forces were subjected to artillery shelling and bypassed on the left flank by the Life Guards Preobrazhenski Regiment. They did not withstand the pressure and set fire to the bridge and retreated to Sofia.

=== Liberation of Sofia ===
The forces of the West group Gurko attacked in total offensive on 22 December / January 3. Column Lieutenant Velyaminov captured Kubratovo and Birimirtsi villages and went to Orlandovtsi village. The column of Major General Rauch captured the bridge at Chardakli farm (today, of the Tsarigradsko Shose over the Iskar river near Vrana Palace) and blocked the retreat route from Sofia towards Plovdiv. The Caucasian Cossack Brigade (commanded by Colonel Ivan Tutolmin) advanced in the direction Dărvenitsa - Boyana. Faced with a real threat of encirclement, Osman Nuri Pasha started a fast retreat in the direction of Pernik - Radomir, abandoning on the road 6000 wounded and sick soldiers. The foreign consuls (Vito Positano and Leander Lege) intervened, preventing an attempt to set fire to Sofia. On 23 December / January 4, 1878 into Sofia entered the first Russian units: Caucasian Cossack brigade and Grodno Hussar Regiment. Large military ammunition depots and supplies were captured. In the cathedral, a service was celebrated in the presence of Lieutenant General Iosif Gurko and Major General Otto Rauch.

== Results ==
After the Battle of Sofia the Orhaniye Ottoman army ceased to exist as an organized military force. The Ottomans suffered irreparable human and material losses. This opened for offensive the direction of Sofia - Plovdiv - Edirne. Plovdiv was liberated on January 16 and Edirne was conquered on 20 January.
