= Ivanyane =

- Village
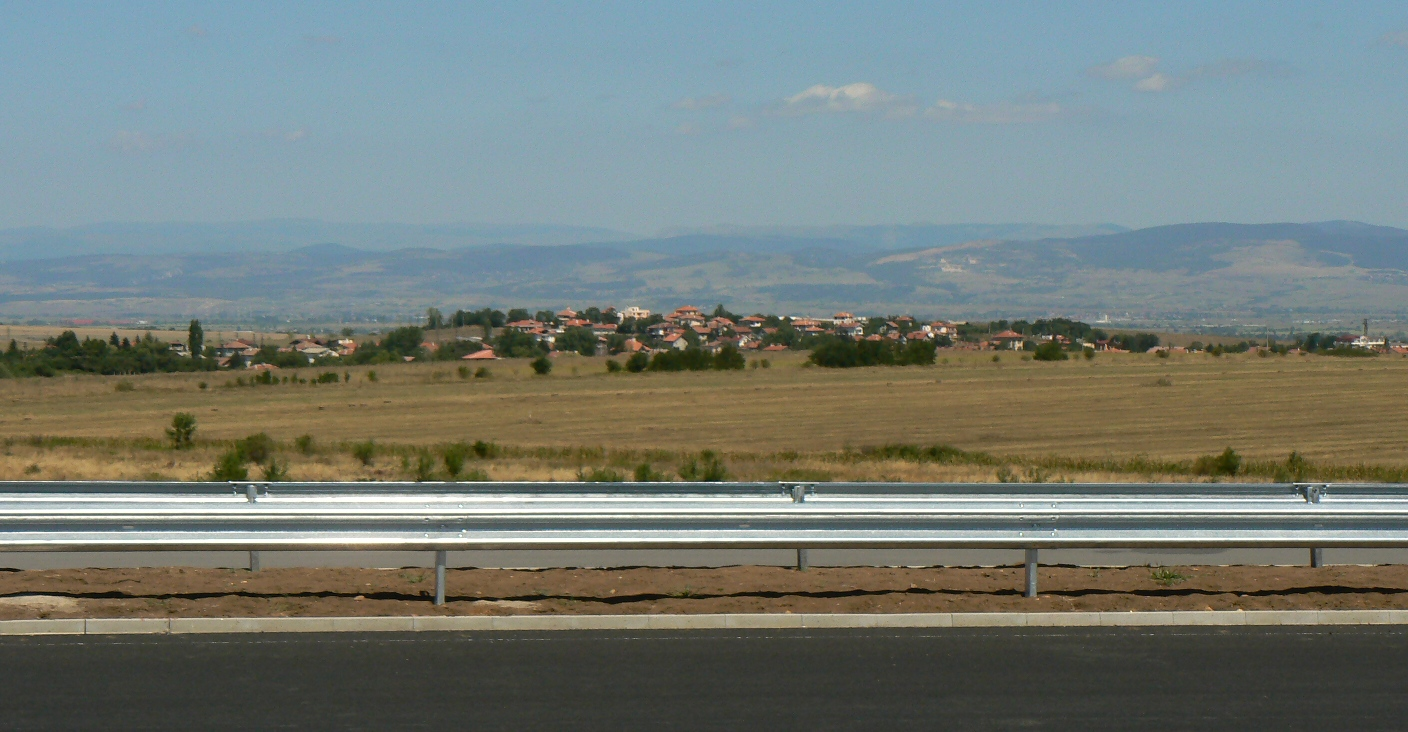

- Location within Bulgaria
- Coordinates: 42°42′0″N 23°11′0″E
- Country: Bulgaria
- Province: Sofia City
- Municipality: Stolichna Municipality
- Elevation: 665 m (2,182 ft)

Population (2024)
  - Total: 1,008
- Time zone: UTC+2 (EET)
  - Summer (DST): UTC+3 (EEST)
- Postal code: 1393

Ivanyane (Bulgarian: Иваняне) is a village in Bankya district of the Bulgarian capital Sofia, located some 12 km southwest of the city center. As of 2024 it has 1,008 inhabitants.

== Geography ==
The village is situated at an altitude of 665 m in the southwestern part of the Sofia Valley, close to the northern foothills of the Lyulin mountain range. It falls within the continental climatic zone.

Administratively, Ivanyane is part of the Bankya district of Stolichna Municipality in the southwestern part of Sofia City Province. It has a territory of 13.594 km^{2}. The closest settlements are the town of Bankya, which is almost adjacent to west and northwest, the westernmost outskirts of Sofia to the east, and the village Malo Buchino to the southwest. The is a large villa zone near the village.

== Transport ==
Ivanyane is served by several local roads. The village lies just north of a junction on the Struma motorway (A3), which links the capital with Blagoevgrad and Kulata in southwestern Bulgaria. There is a railway in Bankya. Ivanyane by two bus lines of the Sofia Public Transport, which provides connection to the Sofia Metro.

== History and culture ==
The area of the village was inhabited since antiquity, as evidenced by the remains of Roman buildings, walls, sewage systems and two late antique churches dated from the 4th–5th centuries AD. The current Church of Saints Cyril and Methodius was constructed in 1903 and was decorated by Bulgarian woodcarvers from the town of Debar.
