= Malo Buchino =

- Village
- Location within Bulgaria
- Coordinates: 42°41′4″N 23°9′40″E
- Country: Bulgaria
- Province: Sofia City
- Municipality: Stolichna Municipality
- Elevation: 753 m (2,470 ft)

Population (2024)
  - Total: 904
- Time zone: UTC+2 (EET)
  - Summer (DST): UTC+3 (EEST)
- Postal code: 1362

Malo Buchino (Bulgarian: Мало Бучино) is a village in Ovcha kupel district of the Bulgarian capital Sofia, located some 16 km southwest of the city center. As of 2024 it has 904 inhabitants.

== Geography ==
The village is situated at an altitude of 753 m on the northwestern foothills of the Lyulin mountain range facing the southwestern reaches of the Sofia Valley. It lies on the banks of the Lyulinska reka, a tributary of the Kakach in the Iskar drainage. It falls within the continental climatic zone.

Administratively, Malo Buchino is part of the Ovcha kupel district of Stolichna Municipality in the southwestern part of Sofia City Province. It has a territory of 12.021 km^{2}. The closest settlements are the town of Bankya to the northwest, the village Ivanyane to the north, the westernmost outskirts of Sofia to the east, and the village of Golemo Buchino in Pernik Province to the south. There is a large villa zone just south of the settlement.

== Transport ==
Malo Buchino is served by the local road SOF1110, which connects Sofia with the city of Pernik. It lies just south of the Malo Buchino junction on the Struma motorway (A3), which links the capital with Blagoevgrad and Kulata in southwestern Bulgaria. The village is served by a bus line of the Sofia Public Transport.
