= Todoraki Peshov =

Todoraki Peshev Тодораки Пешев
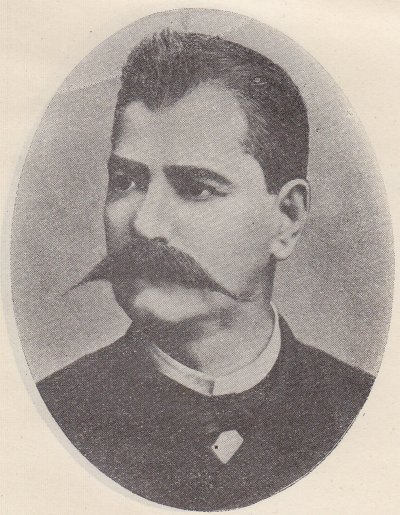

4th Mayor of Sofia
- In office 30 December 1878 – 13 September 1879
- Preceded by: Dimitar Dimov
- Succeeded by: Dimitar Traykovich

11th Mayor of Sofia
- In office 10 May 1884 – 24 August 1885
- Preceded by: Dimitar Hadzhikotsev
- Succeeded by: Ivan Slaveykov

Personal details
- Born: 5 April 1838 Zhelyava, Ottoman Bulgaria
- Died: 1892 Sofia, Principality of Bulgaria
- Party: Independent

Todoraki Peshov (Bulgarian: Тодораки Пешов) (5 April 1838, Zhelyava – 1892, Sofia) was a Bulgarian politician and merchant. After the Liberation of Bulgaria from Ottoman rule in 1878 he became the first elected Mayor of Sofia, which was soon proclaimed capital of the re-established Bulgarian state.

== Biography ==
Todoraki Peshev was born on 5 April 1838 in the village of Zhelyava in Ottoman Bulgaria. He was a son of Pesho Todorov, a merchant who settled in Sofia and was among the leaders of the Bulgarian community in the city. In 1873 Todorov was a member of an Ottoman investigative commission on the Arabakonak robbery that led to the hanging of the Bulgarian revolutionary and later national hero Vasil Levski; Todorov was eventually was exiled by the Ottomans in Diyarbakir in 1875–1878.

Todoraki Peshov studied at the Sofia Class School under Sava Filaretov. He was a member of the local revolutionary committee since 1870 and an associate of Vasil Levski. In 1871 he was a member of the municipal government and was responsible for the teachers’ salaries. After the Liberation of Bulgaria in 1878, Peshov became a member of the first city council of Sofia.

On 30 December 1878 Todoraki Peshov became the first elected Mayor of Sofia and served until 1879. He was the fourth mayor of the city, as the first three were directly appointed by the Provisional Russian Administration in Bulgaria. During his term the Sofia Classical Gymnasium and the First Sofia Hospital were opened. He held the post of a second time between 10 May 1884 and 24 August 1885. During his second term was constructed part of the new water supply system with the inauguration of a reservoir in the then village of Boyana and the connecting pipeline to Sofia. He helped to raise money to erect the Monument to Vasil Levski.

Peshov died in 1892 in Sofia.
