= Otton Egorovich Rauch =

Russian Army Commander

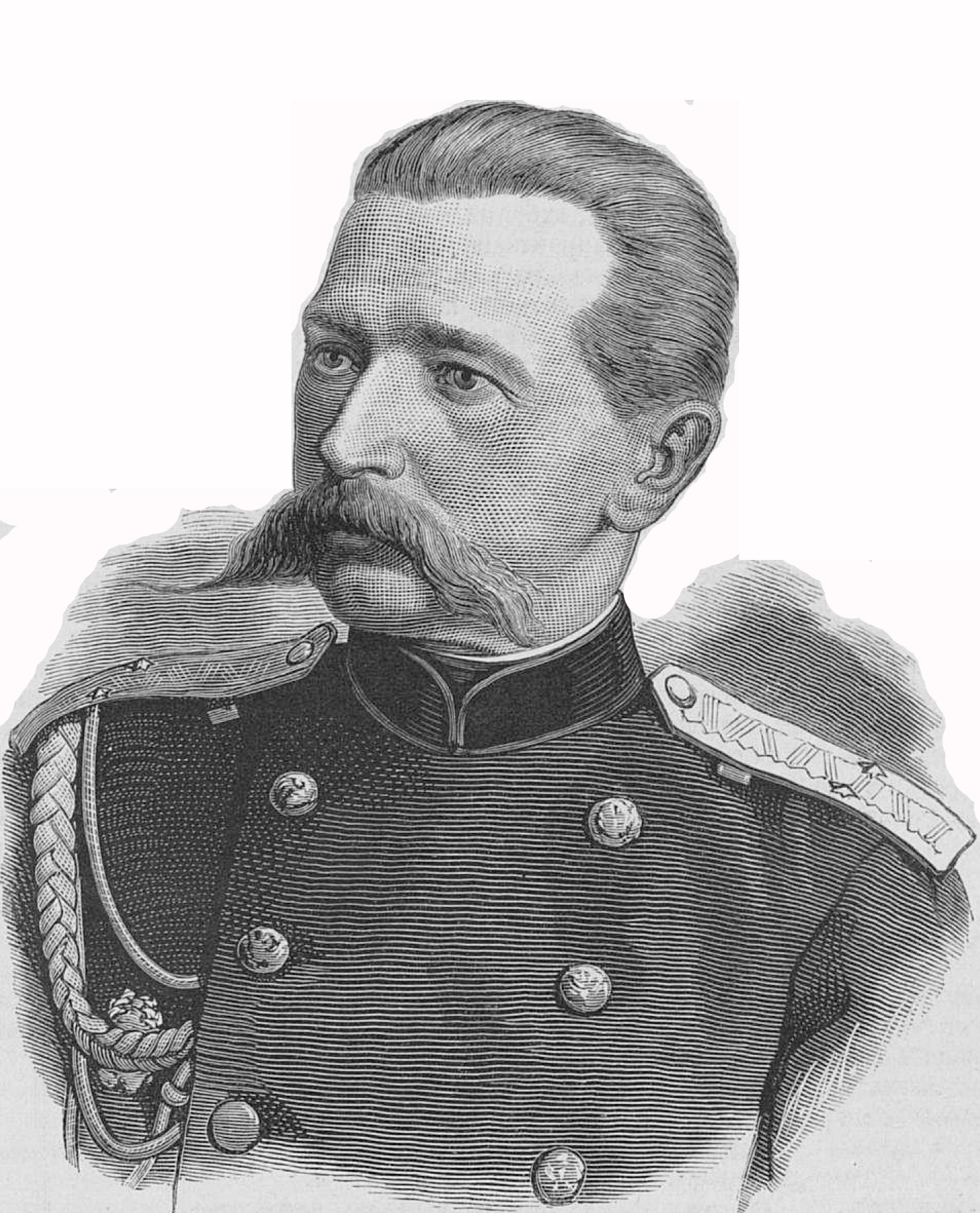
- Born: January 16, 1834; Governorate of Estonia, Russian Empire
- Died: June 29, 1890 (aged 56); Warsaw, Warsaw Governorate, Russian Empire
- Military career
- Allegiance: Russian Empire
- Branch: Imperial Russian Army
- Service years: 1851 — 1890
- Rank: Lieutenant general
- Commands: 22nd Infantry Division; 15th Army Corps
- Conflicts: Russo-Turkish War; Battle of Tashkessen

Otton Egorovich Rauch was a Russian Lieutenant general was most notable for his participation in the Russo-Turkish War.

== Biography ==
Rauch descended from the nobility of the Governorate of Estonia and was born on January 16, 1834.

He was admitted to the 2nd grade of the Saint Peter's School in the summer of 1844 . Then he studied at the School of Guards Ensigns and Cavalry Junkers. He was released on August 7, 1851, to serve as an ensign in the Preobrazhensky Regiment, from where two years later he entered the Imperial Military Academy with the rank of lieutenant, the course in which he graduated in 1855 and, having received the rank of staff captain for excellent success in the sciences, was appointed to serve in the General Staff of the Guards, where for 25 years and held various positions.

From 1857 to 1865 he was a divisional quartermaster in the cavalry and infantry divisions of the guards corps, and also held the post of chief quartermaster of the Separate Grenadier Corps, in 1862 he was promoted to colonel, then at the disposal of the Minister of War and Quartermaster General of His Imperial Majesty's staff, and in 1865 G. was appointed chief of staff of the head of the military ground unit in Kronstadt.

In 1864, Rauch was also chief of staff of the 14th Infantry Division, and in 1865, the 24th Division. He was then appointed assistant chief of staff of the Odessa Military District and on August 30, 1868, was promoted to major general with seniority from 30 August 1869.

With the mobilization of the headquarters of the army in action, in November 1876, Rauch was appointed for special assignments under the commander-in-chief of the army operating against the Turks and successfully fulfilled a number of his assignments: he crossed the border as part of the 1st brigade of the 32nd division, participated in the affairs of the Barbash bridge and Oltenitsy, as well as in the shootout of the Turnian batteries with the fortress of Kherson .

After crossing the Danube, he was appointed in 1877 assistant chief of the forward detachment, formed under the command of Adjutant General Iosif Gurko. In this position, Rauch participated in all the affairs of the vanguard. Crossing the Danube, he headed towards Tarnov; The difficult-to-reach Khainkoisky pass (the passage through the Balkans ) was brought to a condition that was possible for the passage of not only cavalry and infantry, but also artillery. During the actions of the vanguard detachment beyond the Balkans, Rauch was the most active assistant to the chief of the detachment, both in the management of active forces and in the execution of various administrative and economic orders.

On July 19, 1877, the troops of the advance detachment were to simultaneously fight with the detachment of Reuf Pasha and the army of Suleiman Pasha. Rauch at that time was with Adjutant General Gurko, who fought with Reuf's detachment. When the news came that our troops were attacked by the army of Suleiman and were in a hopeless difficult situation, Rauch was ordered to take command over the attacked troops; he galloped through the ranks of Reuf Pasha's detachment, not paying attention to the danger, took command of the detachment, quickly got acquainted with the state of affairs and repelled the attack of Suleiman Pasha; then, seeing the numerical superiority of the enemies, he retreated with a detachment to Kazanlak, from there to Shipka Pass, and here he had already brought the detachment, greatly upset by the unequal battle, in order. For this deed, Rauch was awarded the Order of St. George 4th class.

{{Blockquote text=In retribution for the difference in crossing the Balkans and for personal courage and management in the affairs of Khankia and Kazanlak. }}

Rauch was appointed temporarily commander of the 1st Guards Infantry Division, Rauch admonished the Izmailovsky Life Guards regiment with energetic words during the assault on Gorny Dubnyak. Thanks to the commanding commander, the regiments of the 1st Guards Infantry Division contributed a lot to the surrender of Osman Pasha at Plevna .

When Rauch moved with Gurko's forces to the Balkans, he was tasked with commanding a column directed around the Ottoman defensive position at Pravets. The movement required transporting artillery over steep terrain and through the Iskar River gorge. After reaching the enemy position, the column attacked the Ottoman forces and pushed them back toward the Orhani Valley. The operation contributed to Russian control of much of the foothills of the Balkan Mountains.

When crossing the main Balkan ridge, Rauch commanded the vanguard of the main forces, knocked down the enemy from the Nechashev position and interrupted the communication of the Turkish army with Sofia . In the Takshisen battle, he knocked out the enemy from three redoubts, and soon after that, on the banks of the Isker, he utterly defeated the troops sent against him from Sofia. After a three-day battle in Philippopolis, Rauch's division bivouacked in view of Constantinople. Typhus raged in the division during a long stay at San Stefano; Rauch visited sanitary facilities every day and provided patients with active assistance.

On January 1, 1878, Rauch was awarded the Order of St. George 3rd degree

In retribution for the excellent courage and bravery shown in the affairs of different times with the Turks in 1877.

Also, for military distinctions during the Russian-Turkish war, Rauch was awarded the Golden Weapon for Bravery, the Order of St. Anna of the 1st class with swords (in 1877) and on August 25, 1878, he was appointed to the Retinue of His Majesty.

At the end of the war, Rauch was promoted to lieutenant general (April 17, 1879), appointed chief of the 22nd Infantry Division, and in 1889 the commander of the 15th Army Corps . Among other awards, Rauch had the Order of St. Stanislav 1st class (1874), the Order of St. Vladimir 2nd degree (1881) and the Order of White Eagle (1884).

He died on June 29, 1890, in Warsaw. His son, Georgy Ottonovich, was a general from the cavalry, during the First World War he commanded the 1st and 2nd Guards Corps alternately.
