= Klisura, Sofia City Province =

Klisura
- Village
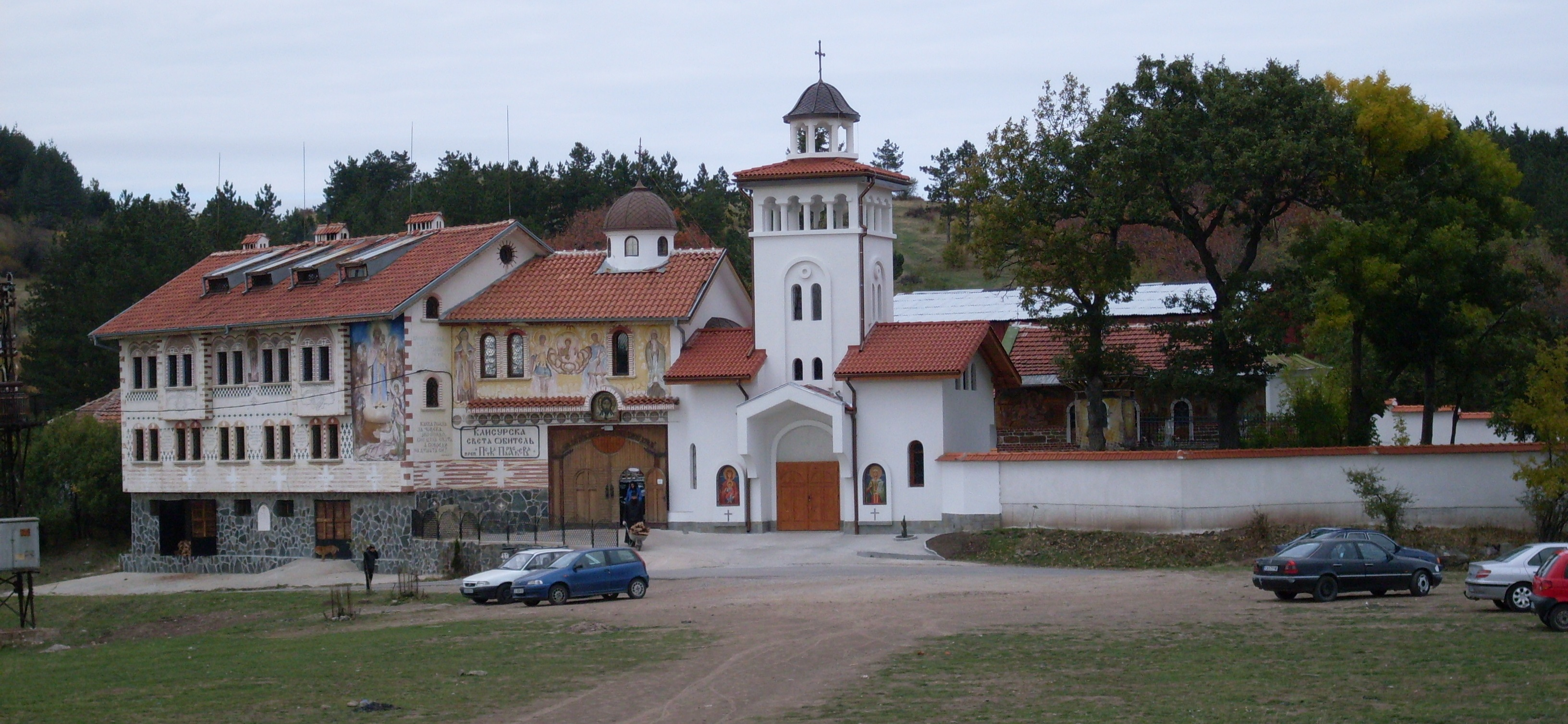

- Location within Bulgaria
- Coordinates: 42°43′11″N 23°4′47″E
- Country: Bulgaria
- Province: Sofia City
- Municipality: Stolichna Municipality
- Elevation: 784 m (2,572 ft)

Population (2024)
  - Total: 198
- Time zone: UTC+2 (EET)
  - Summer (DST): UTC+3 (EEST)
- Postal code: 1320

Klisura (Bulgarian: Клисура) is a village in Bankya district of the Bulgarian capital Sofia, located some 25 km southwest of the city center. As of 2024 it has 198 inhabitants.

== Geography ==
The village is situated at an altitude of 784 m on the northern foothills of the Lyulin mountain range facing the southwestern reaches of the Sofia Valley. It lies just north of the source of the Kakach in the Iskar drainage. It falls within the continental climatic zone.

Administratively, Klisura is part of Bankya district of Stolichna Municipality in the southwestern part of Sofia City Province and is the westernmost settlement in the province. It has a territory of 17.672 km^{2}. The closest urban zones are the town of Bankya to the east and the village of Mala Rakovitsa in the neighbouring Sofia Province to the west.

== Transport ==
Klisura is served by a local road leading to Bankya and Sofia. Another road links it to Mala Rakovitsa. Close to the village is the important Struma motorway (A3), which connects the capital with Blagoevgrad and Kulata in southwestern Bulgaria. Klisura is served by a bus line of the Sofia Public Transport, which provides connection to the Sofia Metro.

== Landmarks ==
About half a kilometer north from the village lies the Klisura Monastery of Saint Petka. Originally established in the 13th century during the Second Bulgarian Empire, it was destroyed by the Ottomans and restored in the 20th century.
