= Kremikovtsi Monastery =

Coordinates: 42°47′49.6″N 23°30′27″E

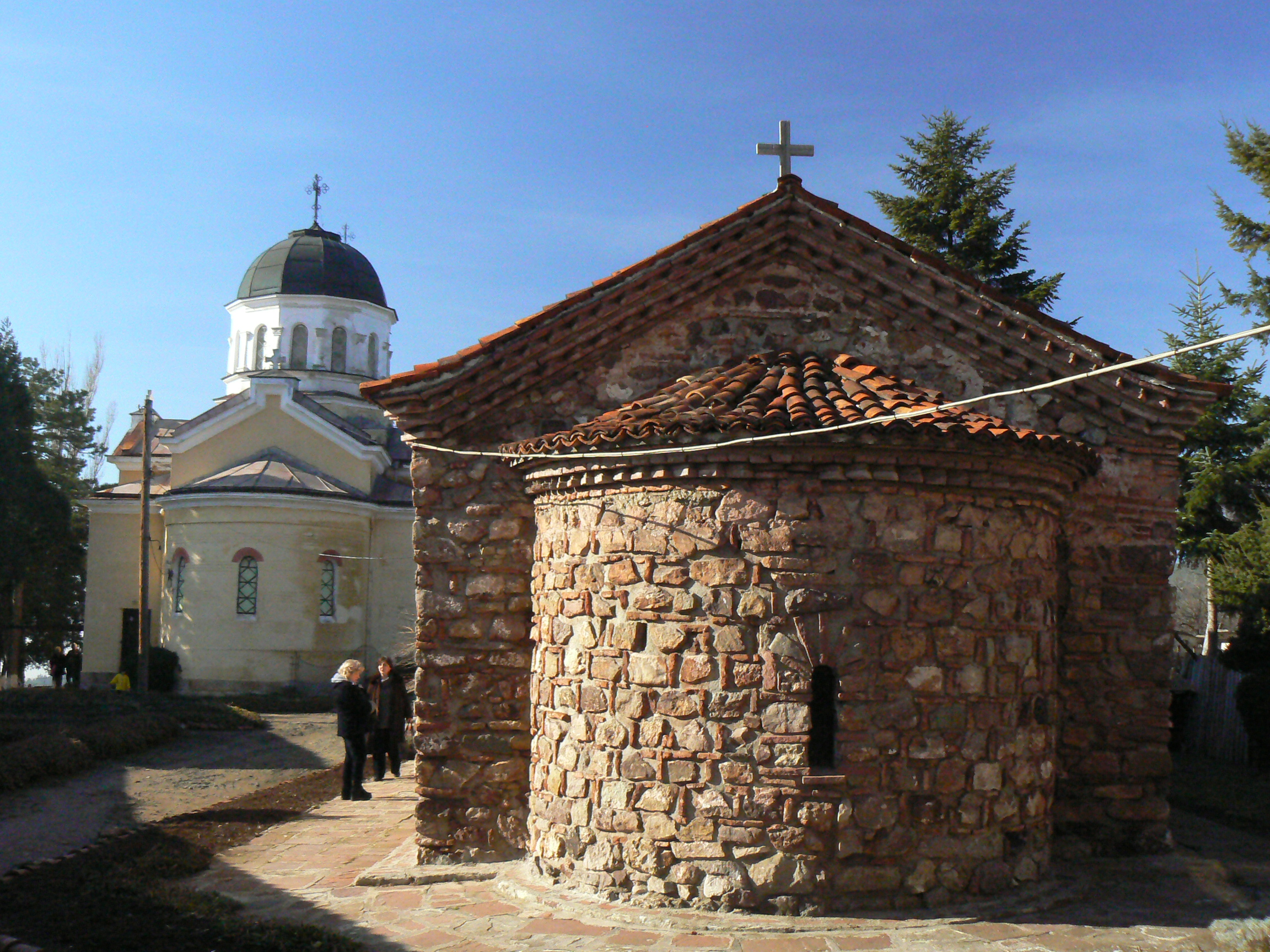
- The courtyard of the Kremikovtsi Monastery with the old and new church

- Location within Bulgaria

General information
- Type: Orthodoxy monastery
- Location: Kremikovtsi, Bulgaria
- Construction started: 14th century

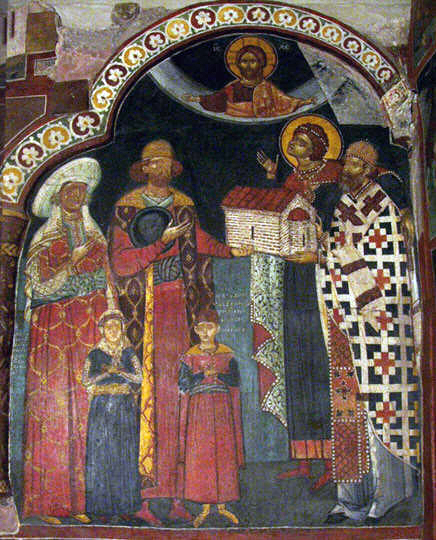
15th-century donor's portrait of Radivoy, his family and the bishop Kalevit inside the old church

The Kremikovtsi Monastery of Saint George (Bulgarian: Кремиковски манастир „Свети Георги“, Kremikovski manastir „Sveti Georgi“) is a Bulgarian Orthodox monastery near Kremikovtsi to the northeast of the Bulgarian capital Sofia. Founded during the Second Bulgarian Empire (12th–14th century) and re-established in 1493 by a local Bulgarian noble, the monastery includes two churches. Of these, the older medieval church is notable for its highly regarded 15th-century frescoes.

== History ==
The Kremikovtsi Monastery lies on a hill 4 kilometres (2.5 miles) from the former village of Kremikovtsi, now an outlying neighbourhood of Sofia. Kremikovtsi is located just northeast of Sofia, at the foot of the Balkan Mountains. The monastery was founded during the Second Bulgarian Empire, perhaps in the mid-14th century on the order of Tsar Ivan Alexander (r. 1331–1371). With the Ottoman conquest of the Balkans in the end of the 14th century, the Kremikovtsi Monastery was destroyed in 1398.

The monastery was re-established in 1493 by the Bulgarian boyar Radivoy from Sofia and the metropolitan bishop of Sofia at the time, Kalevit. Radivoy's act constitutes direct evidence that the medieval Bulgarian aristocracy was retained to some extent during the early years of Ottoman rule. The monastery church was rebuilt from crushed stone as a single-nave church without a dome. Radivoy dedicated the church to his two perished children, Teodor and Dragana. Shortly after the church's reconstruction, its narthex was destroyed by an earthquake and rebuilt in 1503. The church suffered further damage (particularly to its south wall) during earthquakes which impacted the region of Sofia in the 16th and 17th century, and was repaired in 1611. An exonarthex was added in the 18th century.

Inside the monastery courtyard next to the small original church lies a new and bigger one, dedicated to the Intercession of the Mother of God. Along with other new facilities, it was constructed in 1901–1902 to serve the monastery's new inhabitants, 20 nuns from Vardar Macedonia who had arrived in 1879.

== Art and culture ==
The old church features frescoes from several periods on its interior walls. The first layer of mural art was ordered by Radivoy and includes a donor's (ktetor's) portrait of Radivoy and his family presenting a model of church together with Kalevit. The frescoes from this period, which are mostly to be found in the east side of the narthex, are regarded among the most precious Bulgarian art from the 15th century. They have been described as accurate and convincing in their portrayal and as having a warm palette. Additional frescoes were done during the 17th and 18th centuries. A mural painting of a seated Saint George resting his feet on a dragon decorates the church's main section. Another image of the same saint (though on horseback) was painted on a niche on the south wall. The main feature of the altar space is a painting of the Theotokos (Mother of God).

Besides the original frescoes, another remnant from the monastery's re-establishment is a silver reliquary commissioned by Radivoy in 1493 and later used to house the relics of Saint George the New of Sofia. The reliquary was stolen in 1990, though it was recovered and returned to the monastery ten years later, in 2000. The Kremikovtsi Monastery's set of icons ranges in age from the 15th to the 19th century and includes an image of Saint George from 1667 and an image of Christ Pantocrator very similar in style to a fresco from 1493, which may link it to the same author.

In the 15th century, the Kremikovtsi Monastery was a centre of Bulgarian education and culture. At the time, the monastery housed two schools for laymen and one for clergy. An illustrated Bulgarian manuscript produced in 1497 for Peyu and Petko, two citizens of Sofia, the Kremikovtsi Gospel provides evidence as to the existence of a calligraphic tradition at the monastery.
