= Dimitar Obshti =

Bulgarian revolutionary

Dimitar Obshti Димитър Общи
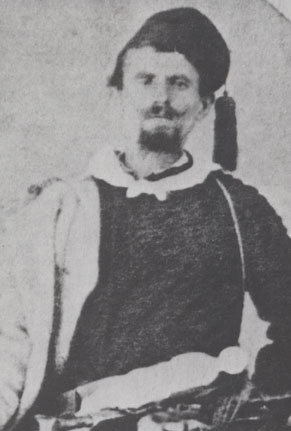
- Born: Dimitar Nikolić (Nikolov) circa 1835; Gjakova, Ottoman Empire (now Kosovo)
- Died: 10 January 1873 (aged 37); Sofia, Ottoman Empire (now Bulgaria)
- Cause of death: Execution by hanging
- Resting place: Sofia, Bulgaria
- Occupation: Revolutionary

Dimitar Obshti (Bulgarian: Димитър Общи) was a 19th-century Bulgarian revolutionary, who fought for the liberation of Bulgaria, Serbia and Crete from the Ottoman Empire, as well as for the Risorgimento of Italy.

== Biography ==
Obshti was born around 1835 in Gjakova, Sanjak of Peć, Ottoman Empire. He joined the first Bulgarian Legion organised in exile, in Serbia's capital Belgrade, in 1862.

There he received military training and met Vasil Levski who became his lifetime comrade in arms. They fought together against the invading Ottomans in Serbia. In April 1868 the Serbian authorities disbanded the Bulgarian legion and expelled its participants from the country. Obshti subsequently joined the forces of the Italian revolutionary Giuseppe Garibaldi and later took part in the 1866–1869 Cretan uprising. In 1869 he became one of the founders of the Bulgarian Revolutionary Central Committee (BRCC) in Bucharest, Romania.

In June 1871 Obshti was sent to Ottoman Bulgaria to serve as Levski's first deputy but compromised his superior's efforts by his adventurous endeavours. He led an assassination attempt against deacon Paisius, vicar to the bishop of Lovech, who was suspected of collaboration and treason. Against the opinion of Levski, in September 1872 Obshti organized the robbery of the Ottoman postal convoy in the Arabakonak Pass in order to fund the BRCC activities. The Ottoman authorities reacted harshly and managed to arrest a number of BRCC militants, including Obshti and Levski. Obshti grasped at the chance to publicize the BRCC activities in order to arouse the Great Powers' interest in liberating Bulgaria. He made some revealing statements in court which led to a great number of arrests and the effective ruin of the clandestine network. He was sentenced to death and hanged in Sofia on January 10, 1873. A month later, the same fate fell on Levski.
