= Robbery in Arabakonak =

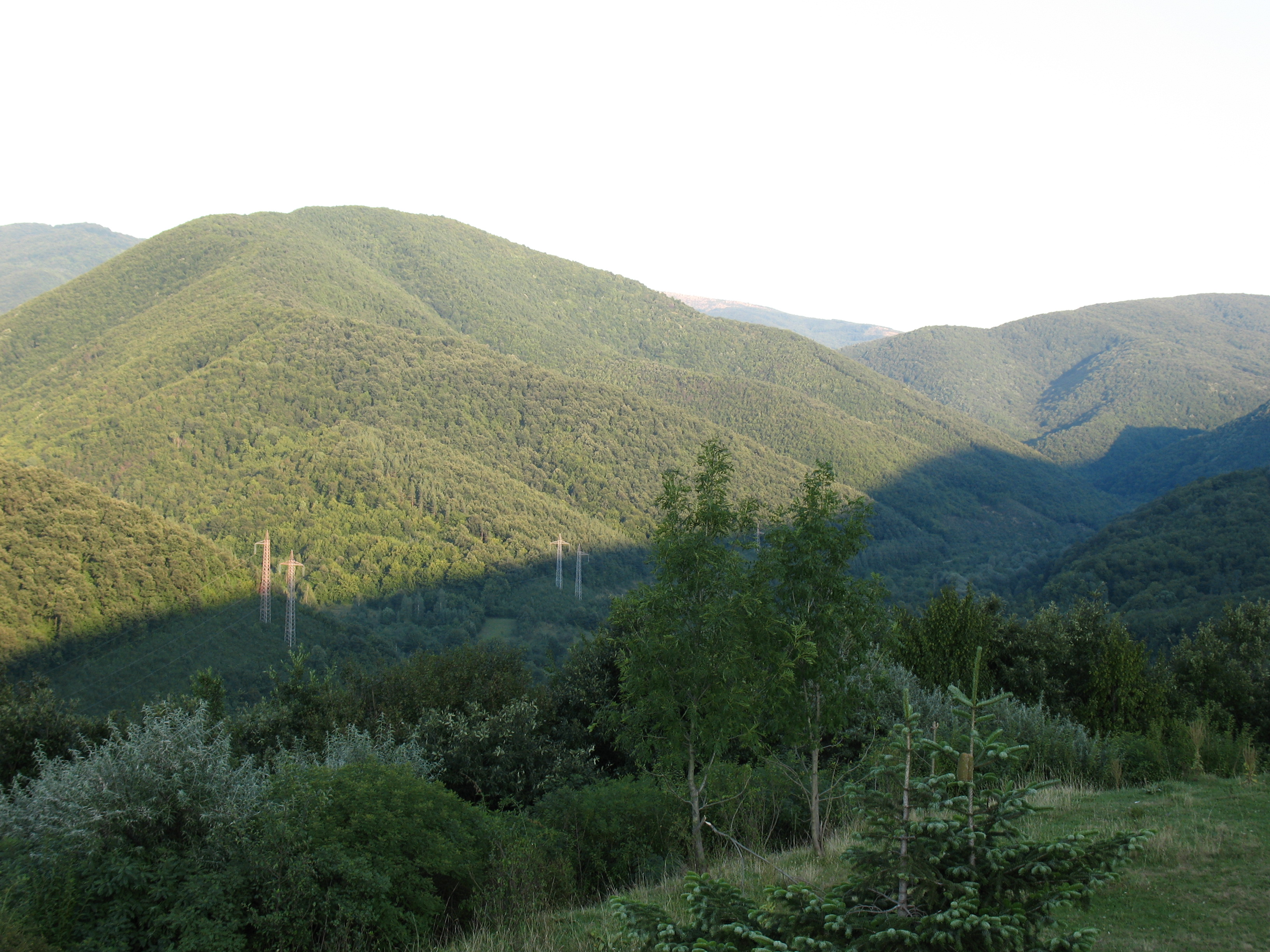
The place of the robbery ambush — 42°47′53″N 23°50′14″E

The Arabakonak robbery took place on an Ottoman postal ox-cart with security guards, transporting the tax revenues from the Orhanie region /the region of Botevgrad/ and the Teteven region and was carried out on 22 September 1872 in the Arabakonak Pass, Ottoman Bulgaria.

The Arabakon robbery was organized by revolutionary committees of the Bulgarian Internal Revolutionary Organization in Teteven, Etropole, Orhanie (now Botevgrad) and Pravets. Dimitar Obshti was involved in the organization.

This is not a criminal robbery, but a political one. The goal was to buy weapons for the nationwide uprising being prepared by the Internal Revolutionary Organization with the raised 125,000 ottoman groschen (1,250 ottoman gold pounds) — post factum it was April Uprising of 1876.

The robbery was successful, but the Ottoman secret police managed to track down the perpetrators, and after hardships and persecution, they were eventually caught. The big problem and failure came from something else — the Ottoman government decided that Russian imperial intelligence was behind the rebels and appointed the Sofia Extraordinary Commission of Inquiry to investigate the robbery. Media noise and international repercussions are being created around the commission. In the end, a Russian connection was not proven, but one of the robbers, Dimitar Obshti, decided that he could provoke international attention and the intervention of the great powers with the lawsuit, and issued the amount of the conspiracy with the Internal Revolutionary Organization.

In the end, no international reaction followed, but the revelations seriously damaged and upset the Internal Revolutionary Organization, and Vasil Levski was captured and hanged.

In the new Bulgarian history, this is one of the most tragic events and has been recreated many times artistically, including Milen Ruskov's novel — Summit from 2011 and the subsequent film of the same name from 2017, which turned out to be the most watched by Bulgarians from Revolutions of 1989.

== See also ==
- Bulgarian Conspiracy of 1835
- Samara flag
- The way to Sofia
- Liberation of Bulgaria
