= Birimirtsi =

Neighborhood in Bulgaria

Coordinates: 42°44′N 23°20′E

Birimirtsi (Bulgarian: Биримирци [biriˈmirt͡si]) is a neighbourhood in Sofia, Bulgaria.
