= Battle of Tashkessen =

1877 battle of the Russo-Turkish War (1877–1878)

Coordinates: 42.7243565°N 23.77532°E

- Part of Russo-Turkish War (1877–1878)
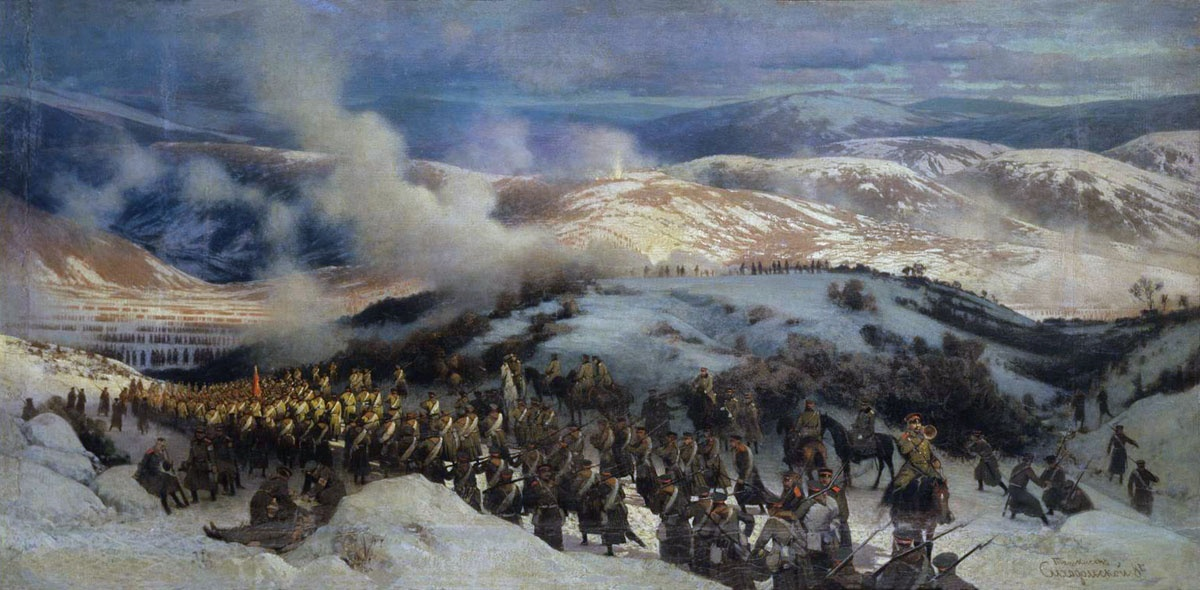
- The Battle of Tashkessen on 19 December 1877 by Pyotr Sukhodolsky
Date	December 31, 1877
Location	Near Tashkessen, Ottoman Empire (modern-day Sarantsi), Bulgaria)
Result	Russian victory

Belligerents
Russian Empire	Ottoman Empire

Commanders and leaders
Arkadiy Kurlov; Iosif Gurko; Otton Rauch	Valentine Baker; Ahmed Pasha

Strength
24,000, 17 guns, of which about 17,000 engaged Russian estimate: 15,000, 22 guns	2,000–2,400 or 3,000, 7 guns and 2 squadrons of cavalry Russian estimate: about 4,000, 7 artillery pieces

Casualties and losses
2,000+ (British claim) 562 killed and wounded (Russian estimate)	Half of the army (800–1,000 men)

The Battle of Tashkessen or Battle of Tashkesan (Turkish: Taşkesen Muharebesi) took place during the Russo-Turkish War of 1877–1878. It was fought between the Ottoman Empire and the Russian Empire on December 31, 1877, in what is now Bulgaria.

== The battle ==
The Ottoman Army of Shakir Pasha, some 14,000 men, was on retreat from the village of Kamarli towards Sofia and Boyacık. Shakir Pasha's army was threatened by a Russian force that Burnaby claimed had 30,000 men and "30 battalions of the Russian Guard" from its left flank, under the command of General Iosif Gurko, and another one, said to be 22,000 men strong before Kamarli. 2,400–4,000 men, 7 guns and two cavalry squadrons of Shakir Pasha's army had been detached under the command of Valentine Baker, a British-born Ottoman general. Baker Pasha was given orders to hold off the advancing Russian army in order to secure the retreat of Shakir Pasha's remaining troops. Baker Pasha entrenched his forces in the village of Taşkesen (now Sarantsi, Bulgaria). The superior Russian army surrounded the Ottomans, but its troops were scattered over a large territory, could not unite together and were slowed by deep snow, winter storm and difficult mountain terrain, so that only a part of them engaged; having a strong defensive position and with weather in their favour, the Ottomans successfully managed to hold off the advancing Russian forces for ten hours, allowing Shakir Pasha to withdraw, and hastily retreated as soon as the firing died down. At the end of the day the Ottoman forces were facing a Russian force ten times its size and ultimately left their position. Burnaby declared that the skirmish had cost the Russians more than 2,000 men and the Ottomans had lost more than 800 men, although the Russians established that only 562 of their men were killed and wounded in total.

During the night panic broke out in the Ottoman ranks, after rumours spread that the Russians had made a flanking movement. This caused the Ottomans to flee the village, killing the inhabitants. Valentine Baker remarked: "We must burn that village to cover our crimes". One of his officers, Allix, accompanied by some men, advanced on the village that had just been captured by the Russians and Bulgarians. They set fire to some straw stacks, which quickly ignited the houses.
