= Iosif Gurko =

19th-century Russian field marshal (1828–1901)

Count Iosif Vladimirovich Romeyko-Gurko
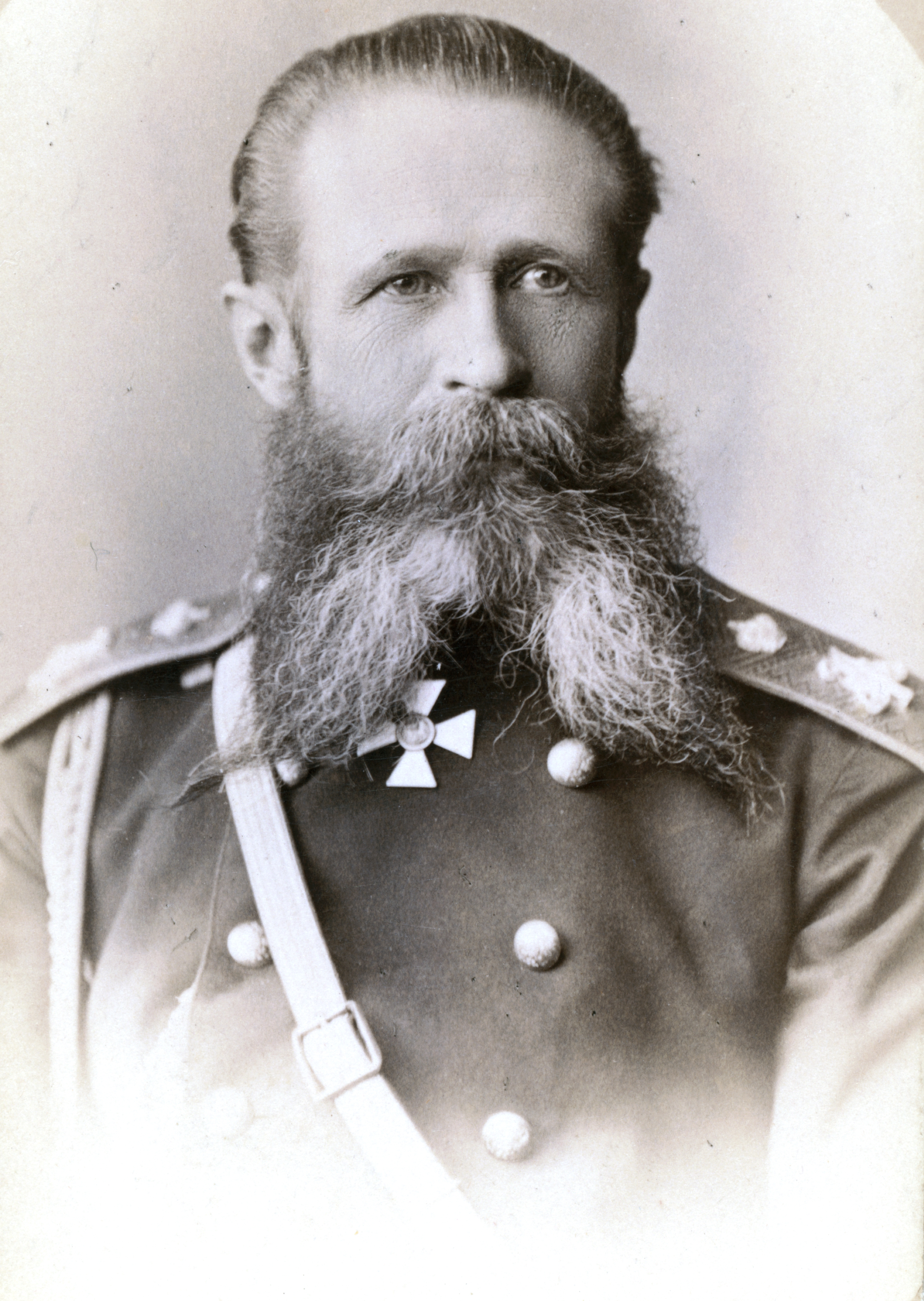
- Born: 28 July 1828; Novgorod, Novgorod Governorate, Russian Empire
- Died: 28 January 1901 (aged 72) near Tver, Tver Governorate, Russian Empire
- Military career
- Allegiance: Russian Empire
- Branch: (Russian Empire) Imperial Russian Army
- Service years: 1846–1901
- Rank: Field Marshal
- Conflicts: Crimean War; Russo-Turkish War; Battle of Shipka Pass; Battle of Eski Zagra; Battle of Gorni Dubnik; Siege of Plevna; Battle of Tashkessen; Battle of Sofia; Battle of Plovdiv
- Awards: Order of St. George

Count Iosif Vladimirovich Romeyko-Gurko (Russian: Граф Ио́сиф Влади́мирович Роме́йко-Гурко́, romanized: Iósif Vladímirovič Roméjko-Gurkó; 28 July [O.S. 16 July] 1828 – 28 January [O.S. 15 January] 1901), also known as Joseph or Ossip Gourko, was a prominent Russian field marshal during the Russo-Turkish War (1877–1878).

== Biography ==
=== Career ===
Of Belarusian extraction, Gurko was educated in the Imperial Corps of Pages, entered the hussars of the Imperial Guard as a sub-lieutenant in 1846, became captain in 1857, adjutant to Alexander II of Russia in 1860, colonel in 1861, commander of the 4th Hussar Regiment of Mariupol in 1866, and major-general of the emperor's suite in 1867.

He subsequently commanded the grenadier regiment, and in 1873 the 1st Brigade, 2nd Division, of the cavalry of the Imperial Guard. Although he took part in the Crimean War, being stationed at Belbek, his claim to distinction is due to his service in the Turkish war of 1877. He led the spearhead of the Russian invasion, took Tarnovo on July 7, crossed the Balkans by the Haim Boaz pass—which debouches near Hainkyoi—and, despite considerable resistance, captured Uflani, Maglizh and Kazanlak; on July 18 he attacked Shipka, which was evacuated by the Turks the following day. Thus within 16 days of crossing the Danube, Gourko had secured three Balkan passes and created a panic at Constantinople.

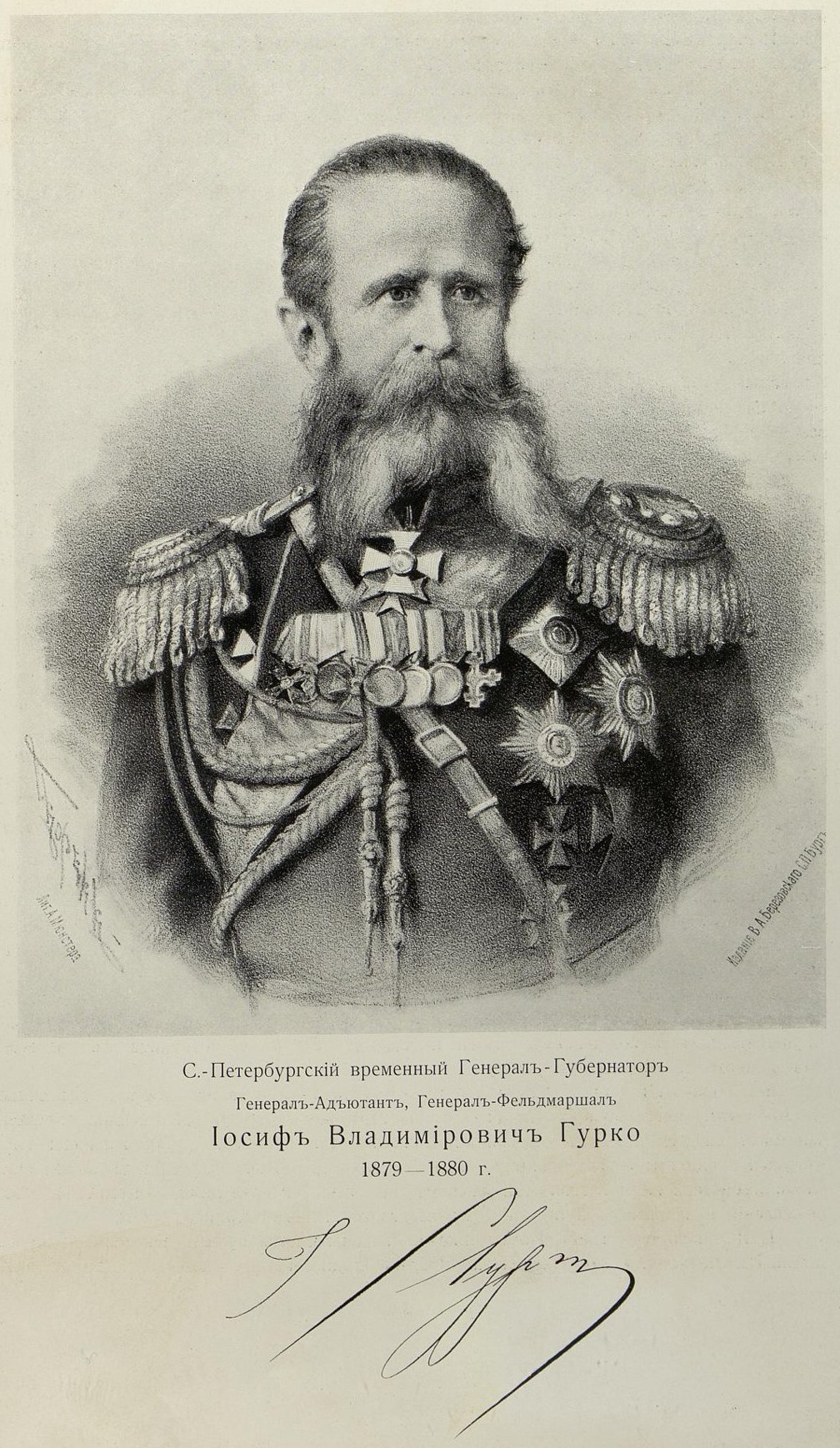
General of the cavalry Iosif Gurko, 1879–1880.

He then made a series of successful reconnaissances of the Tundzha valley, cut the railway in two places, occupied Stara Zagora (Turkish: Eski Zagra) and Nova Zagora (Turkish: Yeni Zagra), checked the advance of Suleiman Pasha's army and returned again over the Balkans. In October he was appointed commander of the allied cavalry, and attacked the Plevna line of communication to Orhanie with a large mixed force, captured Gorni-Dubnik, Telish and Vratsa and, in the middle of November, Orhanie itself. Pleven was isolated, and after its liberation in December Gourko led his troops amidst snow and ice over the Balkans to the fertile valley beyond. He liberated Sofia and decisively defeated Suleiman Pasha at the Battle of Philippopolis and occupied Adrianople. The armistice at the end of January 1878 stopped further operations. With the help of Carol I of Romania and a few other Russian commanders such as : Michael Nikolaevich and Iosif Vladimirovich Gourko, the Russian Empire won the war. After the Russian victory, the Treaty of Berlin was signed, granting independence to Romania, Serbia and Montenegro.

=== Governor-General of Warsaw ===
In 1879–1880, Gurko was a governor of St. Petersburg, and from 1883 to 1894 Governor-General of Poland, where he enforced the Russification policies of Alexander III. While in office as Governor-General of Poland, he carried out significant training maneuvers involving troops from all over the Empire. In late 1883, notable military preparations took place along the Austrian and German borders. This included enhancing the military readiness of railways and steamships which led to delays in grain shipments on the Black Sea. Troops were also stationed between the Vistula and Bug rivers. According to the New York Times, Gourko gave a speech in 1883 where he claimed that the defense against all enemies, regardless of German opinion, was "the cause of all Slavs." The anti-German nature of his rhetoric generated concern that he would be removed from office.

In 1887, observers in Europe noted the buildup of troops in Russian Poland.

In 1890, Gourko was summoned to St. Petersburg, again sparking rumors that he would be removed from his post as governor. The Times of London reported that he would remain in office and that this was the preferred outcome to the Poles. According to the Times, the Poles considered him neither hard nor unjust at that time.

In 1892, notable construction projects were underway including roads, railways, and fortifications. These projects employed 150,000 Poles. In that same year, Gourko heard complaints from factory workers about "brutal treatment" from German overseers. In response, he issued a policy requiring factory overseers to be able to speak Russian and Polish perfectly.

During the cholera epidemic in 1892, Gourko held a conference in Warsaw to decide a response to the spread of the disease. Attendees to the conference included regional governors and police officials.

According to the New York Times, Gourko also played a role in carrying out expulsions from Russian Poland.

=== Later life ===
Gourko experienced paralysis on the entire left side of his body in 1894.

He died in 1901, near the city of Tver.

== Honour ==
Gurko was made a count and decorated with the 2nd class of St. George, Order of the Cross of Takovo and other orders.

Gurkovo town in South-central Bulgaria and General Yosif V. Gurko Street in Sofia, Bulgaria are named after him.
