= Arabakonak =

Mountain pass in Bulgaria

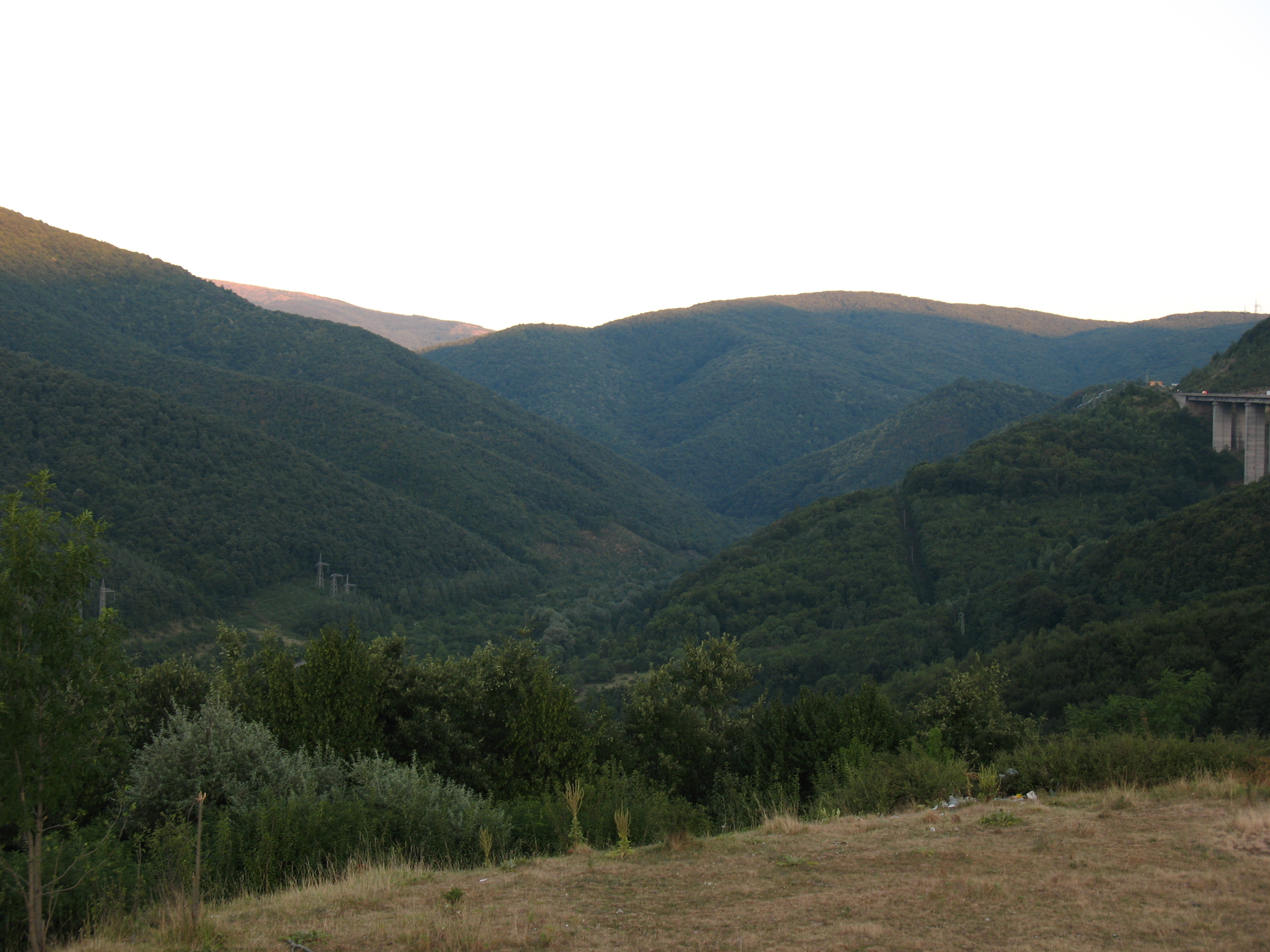
- Arabakonak Pass
- Interactive map of Arabakonak
- Elevation: 980 m (3,220 ft)

Third Approach
- Location: Bulgaria
- Range: Balkan Mountains
- Coordinates: 42°46′06″N 23°50′51″E

Arabakonak (Bulgarian: Арабаконак) or Botevgrad Pass is a mountain pass through the Balkan Mountains connecting Sofia with Botevgrad and Northern Bulgaria. It has been the site of several important events of the history of Bulgaria.

On 22 September 1872, Dimitar Obshti robbed an Ottoman postal convoy in the pass, an event that would lead to the capture and execution of Vasil Levski.

During the Russo-Turkish War (1877–1878), the pass was contested between the Russians and the Ottomans until December 1877.

On 14 April 1925, a group of anarchists organized an unsuccessful assassination attempt on Tsar Boris III of Bulgaria.
