= Krivina, Sofia =

Krivina
- Village
- Location within Bulgaria
- Coordinates: 42°40′59″N 23°28′01″E
- Country: Bulgaria
- Province: Sofia City
- Municipality: Stolichna

Area
  - Total: 10.739 km^{2} (4.146 sq mi)
- Elevation: 535 m (1,755 ft)

Population (2011)
  - Total: 1,418
  - Density: 132.0/km^{2} (342.0/sq mi)
- Time zone: UTC+2 (EET)
  - Summer (DST): UTC+3 (EEST)
- Postal code: 1588
- Area code: 02999
- Climate: Dfb

Krivina (Bulgarian: Кривина) is a village in located in the Stolichna Municipality of Sofia City Province, Bulgaria.
