= Buhovo, Bulgaria =

Buhovo Бухово
- Town
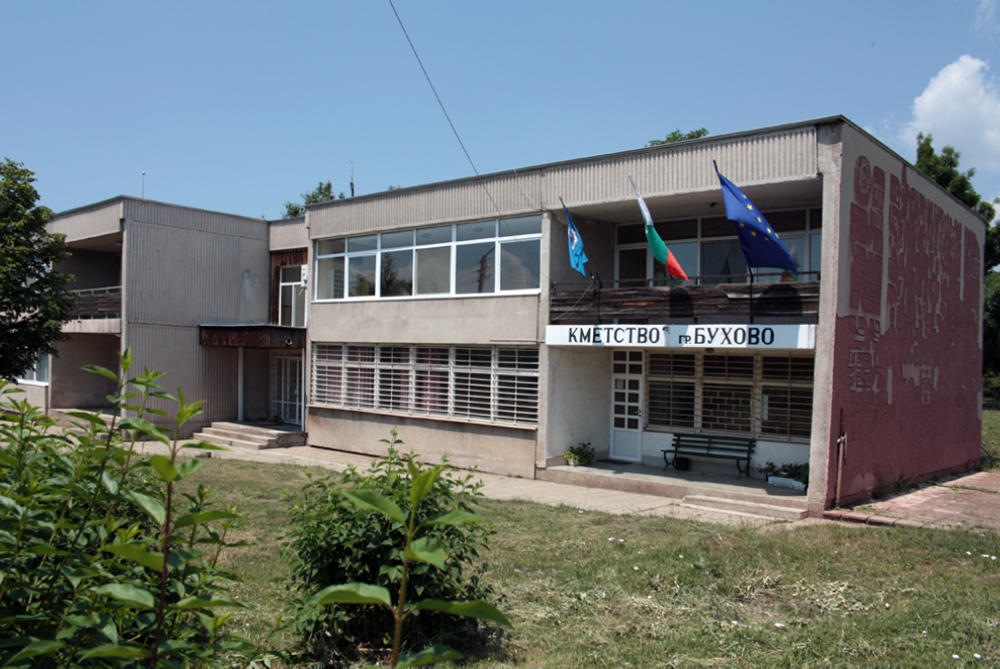
- The town hall in 2011

- Location of Buhovo
- Coordinates: 42°46′N 23°34′E
- Country: Bulgaria
- Provinces (Oblast): Sofia City

Government
  - Mayor: Todor Dimitrov (GERB)

Area
  - Total: 44.82 km^{2} (17.31 sq mi)
- Elevation: 771 m (2,530 ft)

Population (2021)
  - Total: 2,593
  - Density: 57.85/km^{2} (149.8/sq mi)
- Time zone: UTC+2 (EET)
  - Summer (DST): UTC+3 (EEST)
- Postal Code: 1830
- Area code: 02994

Buhovo (Bulgarian: Бухово [ˈbuxovo]) is a town in western Bulgaria and a district within the Sofia Capital Municipality. Buhovo is located 24 km northeast of the center of the capital Sofia.

== History ==
In prehistory, during the middle and late Neolithic (New Stone Age), Buhovo was located 1.5 kilometers east of its current location. Evidence of its previous occupants remains (potsherds, hammers, axes, and awls), through which the event is dated. Back then the name of Buhovo was Ursul.

In 1928 the "St. Nicholas" church was built. In 1938, with help from Germany, uranium deposits were developed.

The village of Buhovo was declared a town with Decree 1942 of the State Council of the PRB of 09.04.1974 (Prom. SG. 72 of 17.09.1974).

== Population ==
Historical population
Year	Pop.	±%
1975	5,153	—
1985	3,986	−22.6%
1992	3,043	−23.7%
2001	2,928	−3.8%
2011	2,744	−6.3%
2021	2,593	−5.5%
Source: pop-stat.mashke.org

== Landmarks ==
- Stadium "Minior"
- A big sports hall
- Monument to the plane of the regiment "Nikola Bonev"
- "St. Maria Magdalena" monastery
- "St. Arhangel Mihail" monastery
- Miraculous icon "Truly Meet" from Mount Athos
- Carting "Buhovo" (formerly)
- Huge rural water fountain used for carpet cleaning.
- Annual gypsy gathering in center, common occurrence in Bulgaria.

== Regular events ==
Annual fair on the last Sunday of June.

Celebrating New Year in front of the Cultural Center.
