= Kremikovtsi =

District of Sofia, Bulgaria

Kremikovtsi Кремиковци
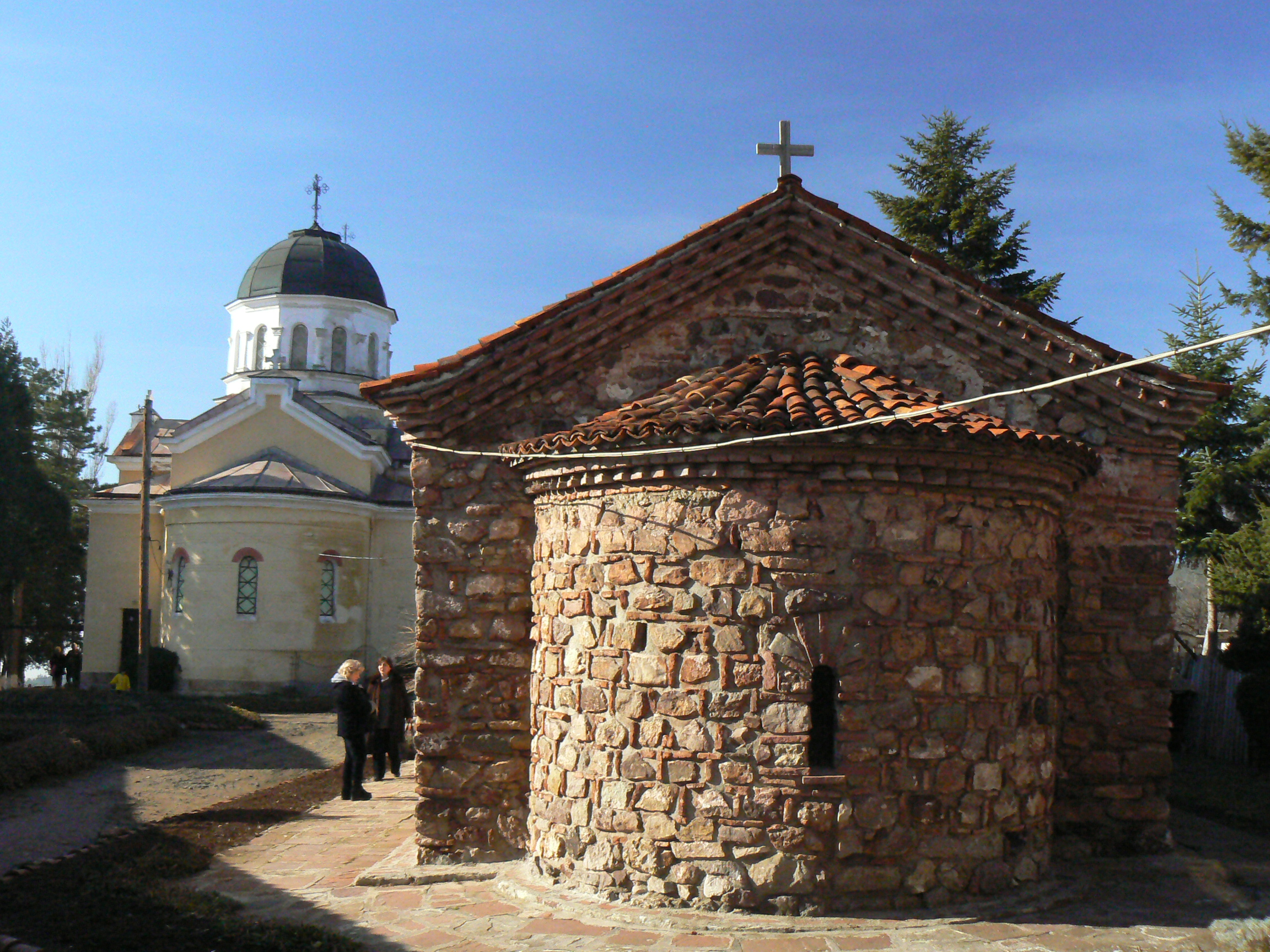
- Kremikovtsi Monastery with the old (1493, front) and the new church (1902, back)

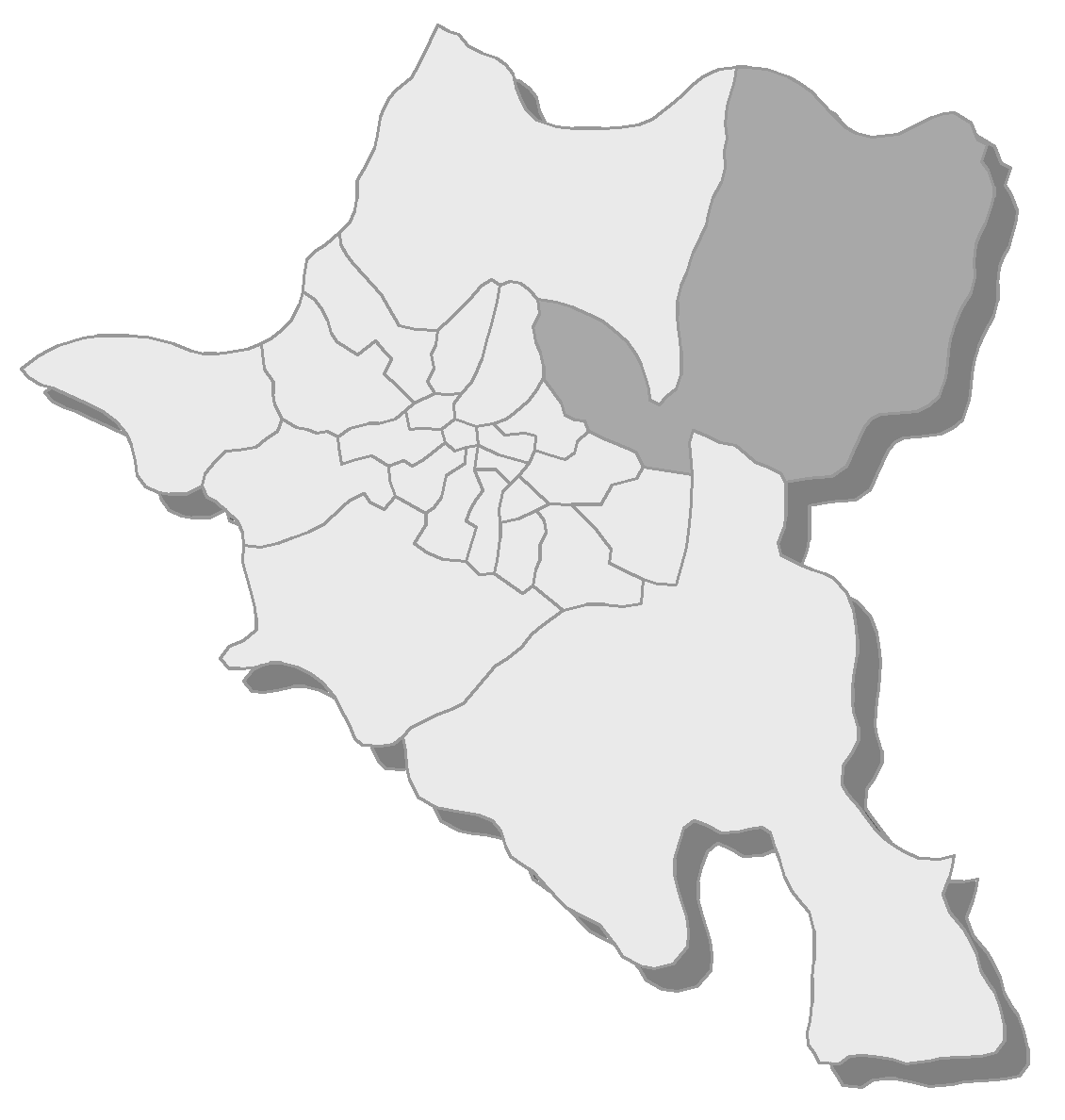
- Location of Kremikovtsi in Sofia
- Coordinates: 42°47′N 23°30′E
- Country: Bulgaria
- City: Sofia

Government
  - Mayor: Ivaylo Panev

Area
  - Total: 272.5 km^{2} (105.2 sq mi)

Population (2011)
  - Total: 23,641
- Time zone: UTC+2 (EET)
  - Summer (DST): UTC+3 (EEST)

Kremikovtsi (Bulgarian: Кремиковци [krɛˈmikoft͡si]) is an industrial district of Sofia, Bulgaria. It is located to the northeast of the capital. The Kremikovtsi Steel Complex which is close to the neighbourhood is one of the largest industrial enterprises in Bulgaria and the Balkans. More than 20,000 people used to work there but this has been reduced to 8,500 due to higher efficiency.

There has been much dispute over the future of the plant, yet no ecological sanctions have been imposed on the plant owners to bring into accord Kremikovtsi's pollution status by investing in filtering installations. Insofar, no action has been taken to either close the plant or exercise government power to control the level of harmful emissions to the air, which gave rise to concerns of corruption in the government of the Bulgarian Socialist Party's ruling coalition.

Three kilometers outside the Kremikovtsi, overlooking the village from its surrounding hills, lies the Monastery of St. George the Victorious, notable for its older church's 16th century frescoes showing patron St. George as well as other saints.

Kremikovtsi was first mentioned in 1452 and was in continuous existence throughout the 16th–19th centuries, as evidenced by written sources. Its name is derived from the initial placename *Kremikovo or *Kremik, from the dialectal word kremik ("flint", from Old Bulgarian КРЄМЪІКЪ). Previously a separate village, it was merged with Sofia in 1978.
