= Kremikovtzi AD =

- Company type: joint-stock company
- Industry: metalworking
- Founded: 1963
- Defunct: 2009
- Headquarters: Sofia, Bulgaria
- Products: cast iron, steel and others
- Number of employees: 6979
- Website: http://www.kremikovtzi.com/

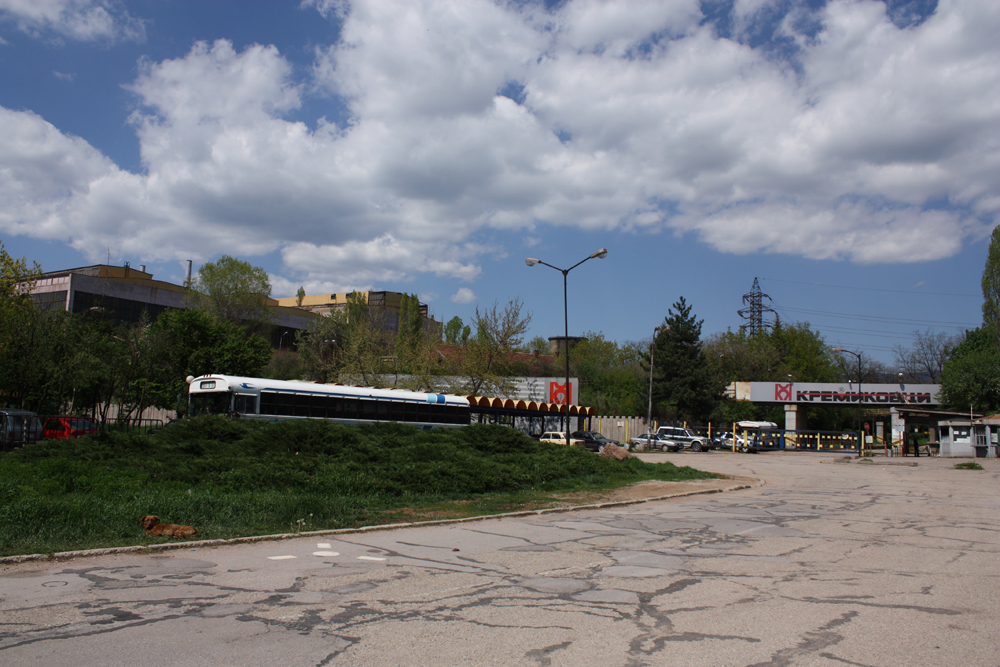
Entrance to Kremikovtzi AD

Kremikovtzi AD (Кремиковци АД) was Bulgaria's largest metalworking company. The construction of its facilities began on 5 November 1960 and the first production capacities were put into operation in 1963 to produce cast iron and coke, with production extending to cover other areas in the 1960s and 1970s.

The company was privatised in 1999 - 71% of it was acquired for US$1 by Daru Metals (a Bulgarian owned company, later to change its name to Finmetals Holdings). Most of Kremikovtzi AD's production was exported to the European Union, Turkey, some of the former Yugoslav countries, the United States and China. The profit was 120 million leva in 2003 and 80 million leva in 2004. However, bad management and other factors led to the company generating losses of more than BGN 200 million for 2005.

In January 2005, Kremikovtzi AD acquired 70% of the LEMIND-FPL polyester-covered sheet iron factory in Leskovac, Serbia for €1.4 million. The company also made another acquisition in April 2005, purchasing the Llamkos galvanised sheet iron factory in Vucitrn, Kosovo for €4.15 million. Both plants were disposed of upon Kremikovtzi's takeover by Global Steel Holdings Limited (GSHL).

In 2005 Valentin Zahariev and Kiril Zahariev sold 100% of Finmetals Holdings for US$110 million to GSHL, owned by Pramod Mittal, brother of the highly successful Lakshmi Mittal. Kremikovtzi is not related to the Arcelor Mittal group. The new management brought by GSHL has embarked on an investment program aiming to increase the product quality, reduce the production costs and widen the product range. The key focus of this was the finalisation of the new Continuous Caster and a new Converter. Both were finally put in full operation in November 2006, after being under construction for more than 15 years.

In November 2006, the debt obligations of the company were subject to extreme price volatility as speculation mounted about the depth of commitment to the business by GHSL. Pramod Mittal, the company's owner, issued a statement to reassure investors of his ongoing interest in Kremikovtzi's success; but this was not sufficient to dampen the ongoing volatility of the debt price. At the beginning of December 2006, GSHL issued another statement, this time committing to inject cash into the business on an ongoing, quarterly basis.

Mittal withdrew from the company a year or so later and the company was kept afloat by the socialist government, desperately seeking for a potential investor. All negotiations ultimately failed. Fuel and salaries were not being paid during that period, creating additional debts for the company. Since December 2008 the factory was virtually non-functioning, kept in a safe-standby mode.

On May 15, 2009, gas supply (main fuel for the factory's operations) has been cut off, the coke production plant - one of the most controversial symbols of the company - has been shut down permanently.

In 2011 the factory is sold to an SPV financed by First Investment Bank. Since then the terrain was partially cleared and opportunities for redevelopment are being sought.

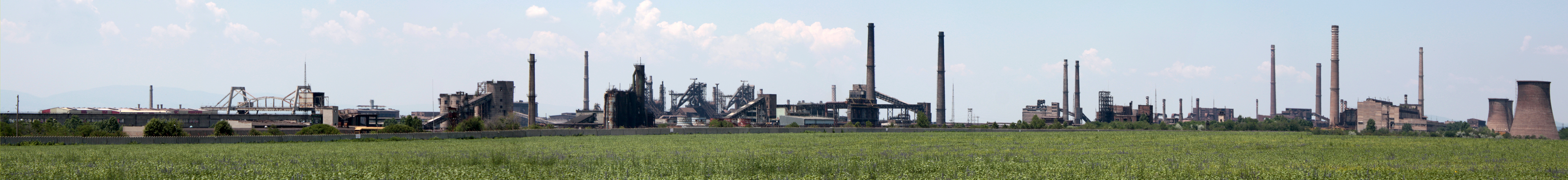
Krtemikovtsi AD - panoramic view
