= Sofia Public Transport =

The public transport in Sofia consists of a comprehensive network of bus, trolleybus, tram and metro lines. It is overseen by the Sofia Urban Mobility Center, a municipal enterprise responsible for route planning, scheduling, fare collection and ticket inspection. It also pays the various transport operators for their service on a per-kilometer basis. Sofia is the only city in Bulgaria that operates the four modes of public transport.

Public transport in Sofia is operated by three municipal and one private company — Sofia Public Bus Transport Company JSC operates the majority of bus services; Sofia Public Electrical Transport Company JSC operates the tram and trolleybus networks; Metropoliten JSC operates the Sofia Metro; and the private company MTK Group operates some, mainly suburban, bus services.

== Metro ==
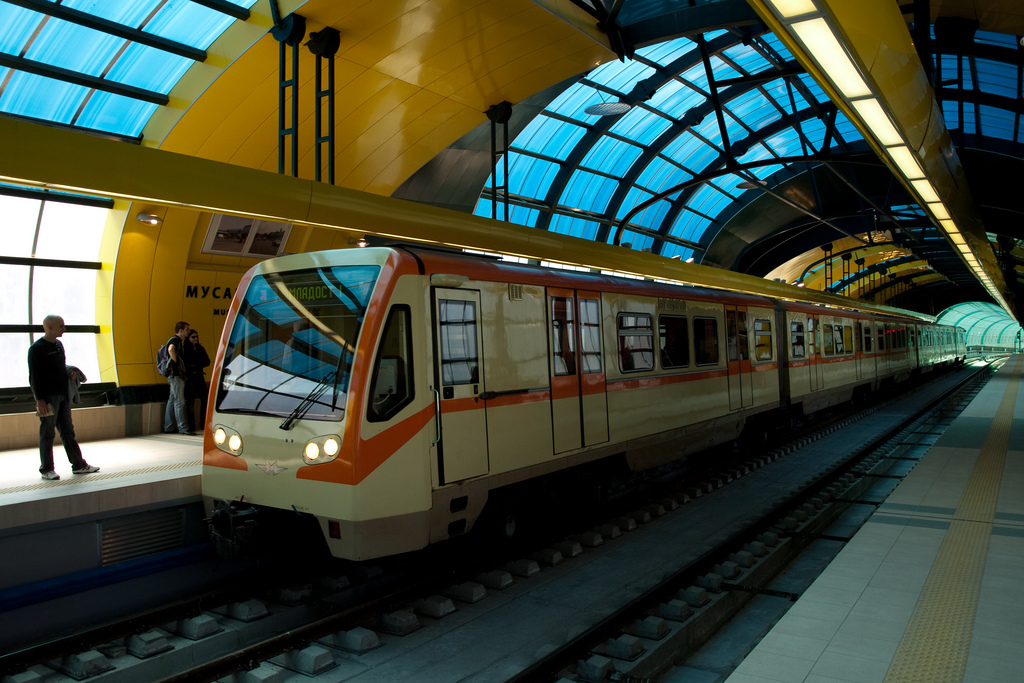
Musagenitsa Metro Station, 2009

The Sofia Metro is the only metro in Bulgaria. It began operation on 28 January 1998. As of 2023, the Sofia Metro consists of four interconnected lines, serving 47 stations, with a total route length of 52.0 kilometres (32.3 mi) and also being among the top 20 of the most extensive European metro systems, ranking 19th as of 2020. The Metro links the densely populated districts of Lyulin – Mladost (M1 line – Red) and Nadezhda – Lozenets (M2 line – Blue), and serves the Sofia Airport.

== Tram ==
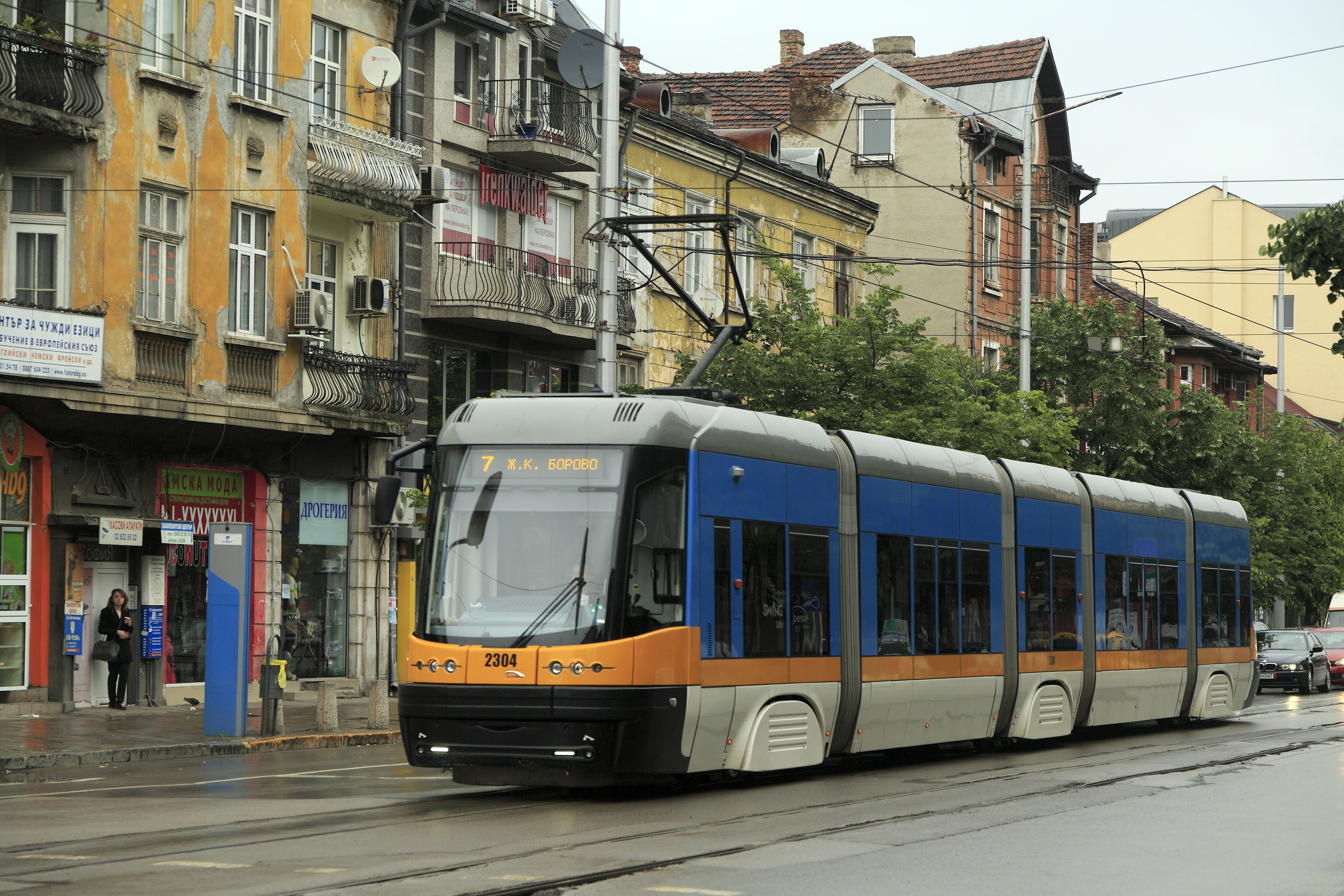
PESA 122NaSF Swing tram in Sofia on line 7

Trams began operation on 1 January 1901. As of 2006, the tram system included approximately 308 kilometres (191 miles) of narrow and standard gauge one-way track and operates 15 lines. Most of the track is a narrow gauge (1,009 mm or 3 ft 3 23/32 in), with standard gauge (1,435 mm or 4 ft 8 1/2 in) used on lines 20, 22 and 23 and accounting for approximately 40 kilometres (25 mi) of the system's track length. The average speed of trams in Sofia as of 2020 is 14 km/h.

== Rail ==
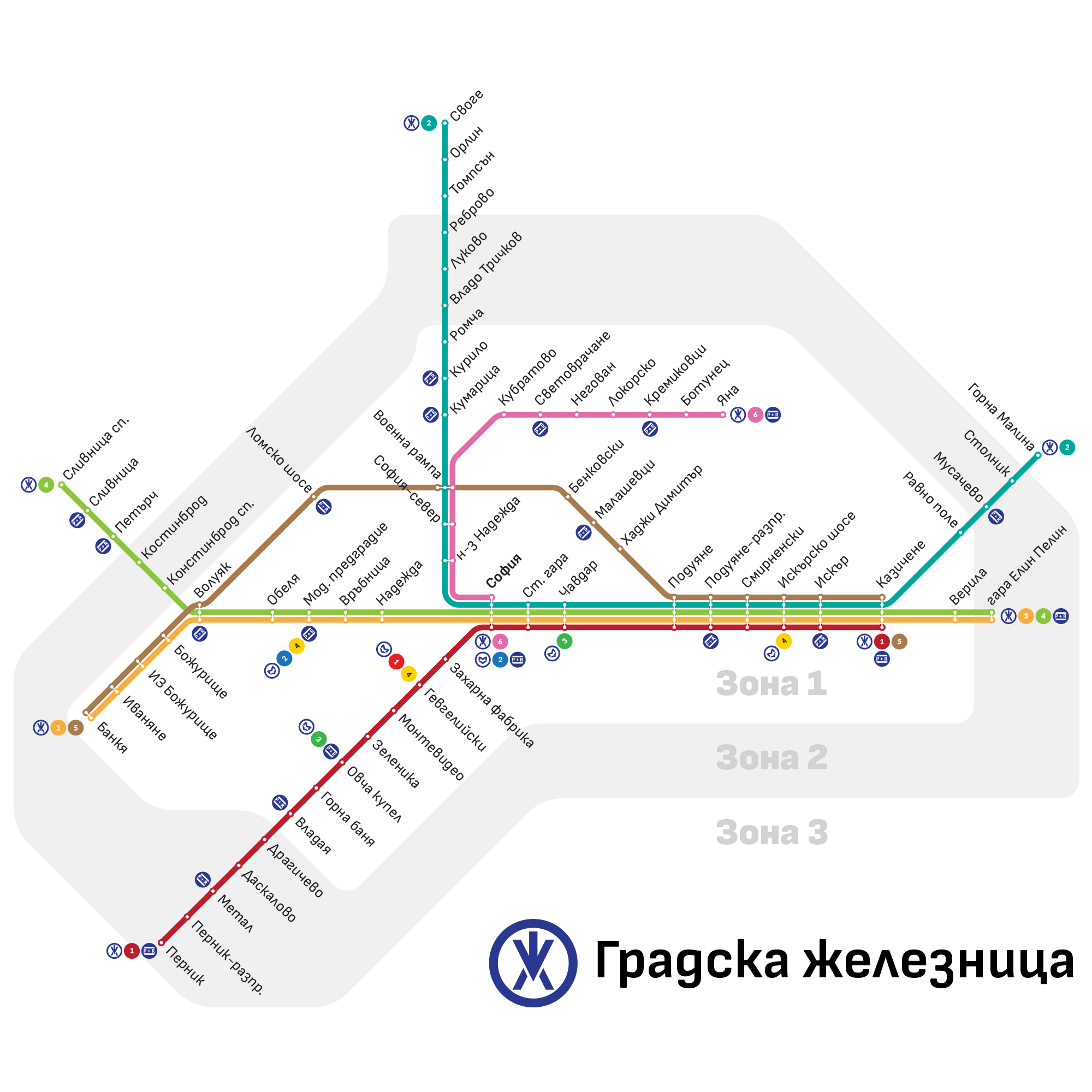
Proposed map of the alleged commuter rail network, made by Spasi Sofia

Plans for a regional, if not a suburban, rail system have been discussed for a while, but no official plans have been prepared. Non-government organizations, like Spasi Sofia, have announced their interest for the creation of a regional rail network.

== Trolleybus ==
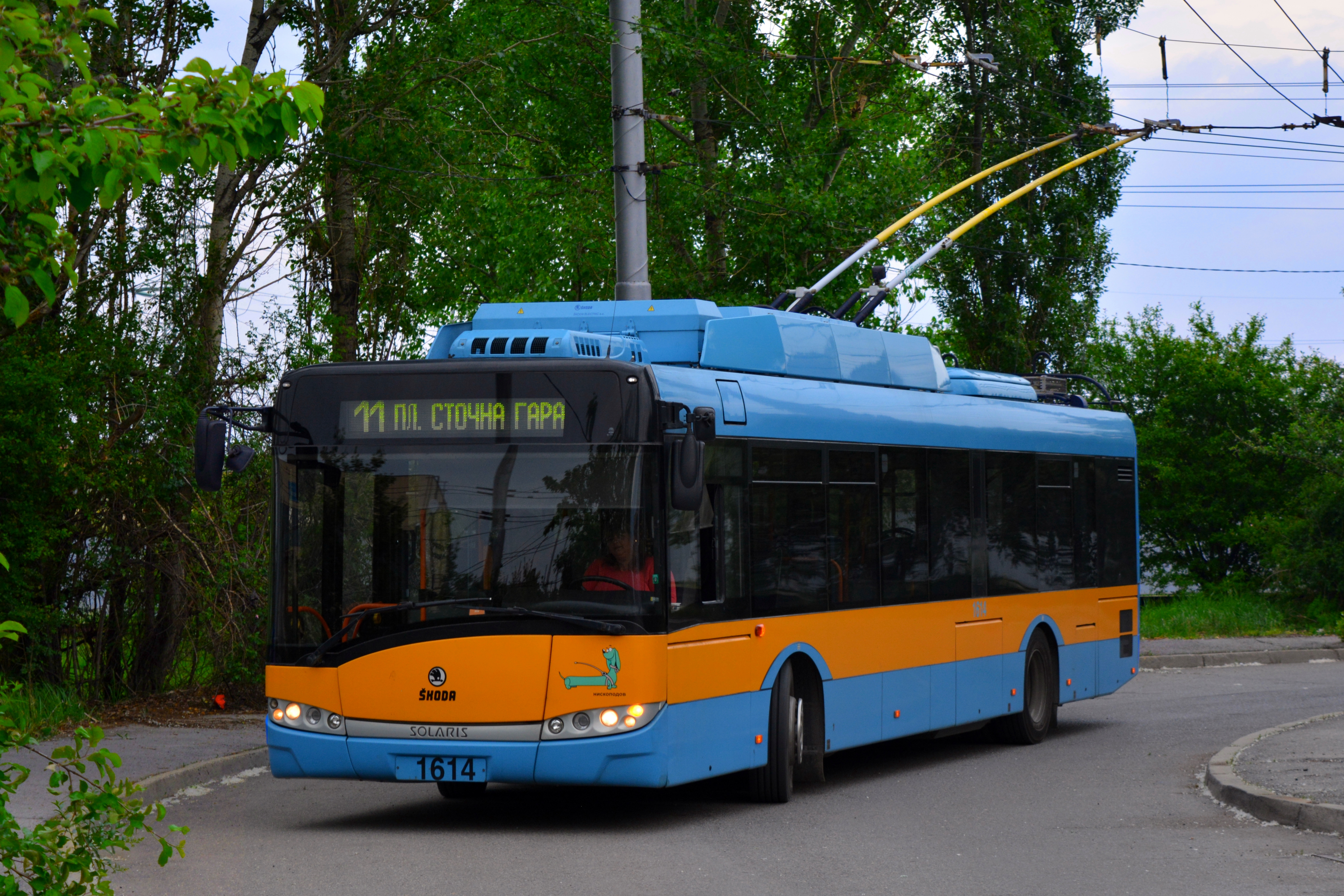
Škoda Solaris 26tr trolleybus in Sofia on line 11

Trolleybus transport was the last form of surface public transport to develop in Sofia, after buses and trams. The first Sofia trolleybus line opened on 8 February 1941. It was over 3 km (2 mi) long, and connected the city with the Gorna Banya quarter. The line was covered by 2 MAN trolleybuses, which were stored on the last stops during the night, due to the lack of depot.

In the 1950s and 1960s, massive development of the trolleybus transport in Sofia began. At that time, the construction of new trolleybus routes proceeded especially rapidly, and two depots ("Stochna Gara" and "Nadezhda") were opened, with a total capacity of 160 trolleybuses. In 1951, the first Bulgarian made trolleybuses entered service. In 1987, a new depot, "Iskar", was opened with a capacity of 130 trolleybuses. "Levski" depot was opened in 1994 with a capacity of 60 trolleybuses. As of 2021 three depots are in operation: "Nadezhda", "Iskar" and "Levski". The latter also serves as a storage and overhaul facility. The system presently comprises 10 routes with 193 km route length.

== Bus ==
The public bus transport in Sofia developed relatively late compared to the other types of transport in the city. The first operational line was opened on 20 April 1935. Soon after that six more lines were opened, bringing the total network length to 23 km.

During the communist era, the bus fleet consisted mainly of Ikarus and Bulgarian-made Chavdar buses. After the political changes in 1989, however, the fleet has gradually been modernised. The system presently comprises 98 routes with a length of 2,380 km.

== Taxi ==
Green Taxi, Sofia, 2026

Until the fall of socialism in Bulgaria, all taxis were VAZ-2101 and Moskvitch 2138. Today, in Sofia, Hyundai Sonata taxis are mainly found. In 2013, "green" Toyota Prius taxis were introduced. It is hightly recommended to use a App or let the Hotel/ Airport call one of the big Taxi companys instead of going to a random waiting (illegal) scam taxi in front of the airport.

== See also ==
- Sofia Metro
- Transport in Bulgaria
- List of metro systems
- List of tram and light rail transit systems
