= Postal codes in Bulgaria =

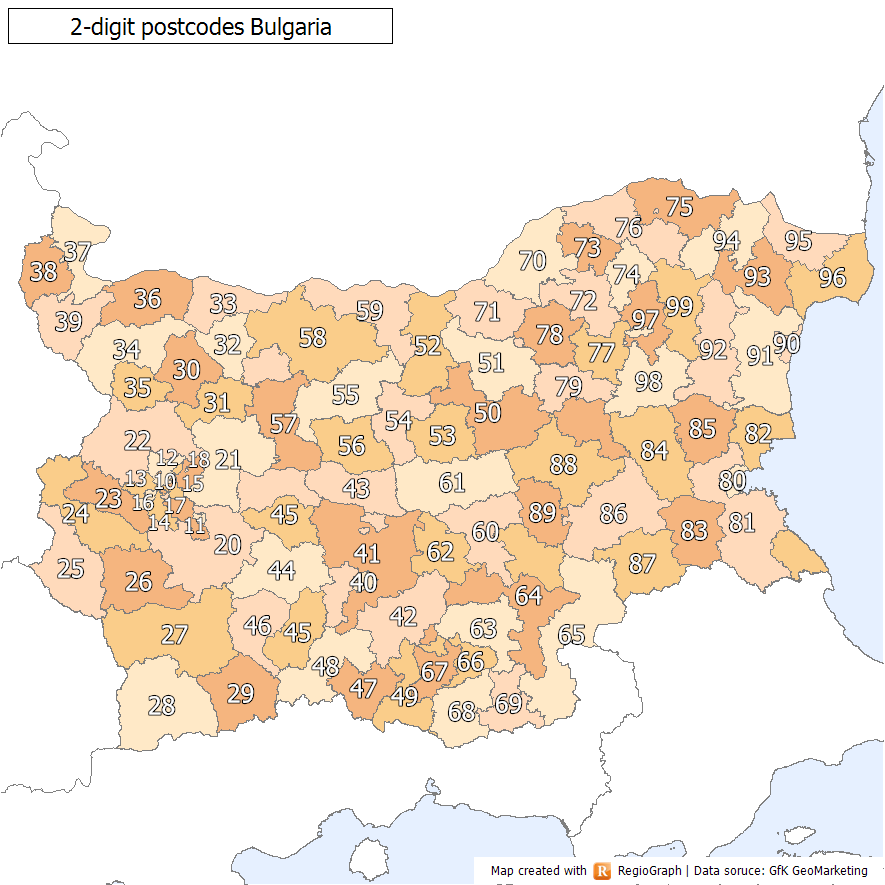
2-digit postcode areas Bulgaria(defined through the first two postcode digits)

Postal codes in Bulgaria have four digits.

== Postcode regions by province ==
Bulgarian postal codes have four digits. There are no separator characters. Below the first digit for each of the provinces of Bulgaria is shown.

- 1xxx Sofia City (София-град)
- 2xxx Sofia Province (Софийска област)
- 3xxx Vratsa Province (Враца)
- 4xxx Plovdiv Province (Пловдив)
  - 44xx Pazardzhik Province (Пазарджик)
- 5xxx Veliko Tarnovo Province (Велико Търново)
  - 55xx Lovech Province (Ловеч)
  - 58xx Pleven Province (Плевен)
- 6xxx Stara Zagora Province (Стара Загора)
- 7xxx Ruse Province (Русе)
- 8xxx Burgas Province (Бургас)
- 9xxx Varna Province (Варна)
