= Electoral region (Bulgaria) =

The territory of Bulgaria is divided into 31 electoral regions (Bulgarian: Избирателни райони, romanized: Izbiratelni rayoni) roughly corresponding to the 28 provinces (Bulgarian: Области, Oblasti) of Bulgaria.

== National Assembly Seats ==
Each electoral region nominates a predefined number of seats to the National Assembly of Bulgaria, according to census data for the population of each region. Since 1991, a proportional electoral system was used, with the exception of 2009 parliamentary election. For 2013 parliamentary election the previous proportional electoral system was restored.

In 2009 a mixed system with both simple majority and proportional distribution was introduced. Each one-seat region corresponds to the traditional multi-seat regions. Because of the big diversity of population between regions, this one-seat distribution came into contradiction to article 10 of the Constitution of Bulgaria, stating that elections are to be conducted with equal right to vote. An appeal of this contradiction was brought to the Constitutional Court of Bulgaria, which failed to make a decision, voting 6 to 6. The number of proportional seats for each electoral region was to be reduced by one to allow 31 simple majority seats to be added, while keeping the total number of seats to 240. This led to another controversy, as the seats for some of the regions were reduced by 1, others by 2 and some kept the same number of seats, effectively increasing the total number of seats for the region, including the simple majority seat.

== Electoral regions ==
Most electoral regions correspond to the 28 provinces of Bulgaria, except for the two most populous provinces, which are further subdivided. Plovdiv Province is divided into Electoral region 16, corresponding to Plovdiv municipality and Electoral region 17, covering all other municipalities. Sofia City is divided into Electoral regions 23, 24 and 25. Sofia Province which is distinct from Sofia City is represented by Electoral region 26.

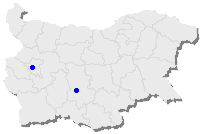
Electoral Regions Regions 23,24,25 (Sofia) in the west Region 16 (Plovdiv) in the south

| # | Name | Constituencies | 2005 Seats | 2009 Seats | 2013-2017 Seats |
|---|---|---|---|---|---|
| 1 | Blagoevgrad (Благоевград) | Blagoevgrad Province | 10 | 9+1 | 11 |
| 2 | Burgas (Бургас) | Burgas Province | 13 | 11+1 | 14 |
| 3 | Varna (Варна) | Varna Province | 14 | 12+1 | 15 |
| 4 | Veliko Tarnovo (Велико Търново) | Veliko Tarnovo Province | 9 | 8+1 | 8 |
| 5 | Vidin (Видин) | Vidin Province | 4 | 3+1 | 4 |
| 6 | Vratsa (Враца) | Vratsa Province | 7 | 6+1 | 6 |
| 7 | Gabrovo (Габрово) | Gabrovo Province | 4 | 4+1 | 4 |
| 8 | Dobrich (Добрич) | Dobrich Province | 7 | 6+1 | 6 |
| 9 | Kardzhali (Кърджали) | Kardzhali Province | 5 | 4+1 | 5 |
| 10 | Kyustendil (Кюстендил) | Kyustendil Province | 5 | 4+1 | 4 |
| 11 | Lovech (Ловеч) | Lovech Province | 5 | 4+1 | 5 |
| 12 | Montana (Монтана) | Montana Province | 6 | 5+1 | 5 |
| 13 | Pazardzhik (Пазарджик) | Pazardzhik Province | 9 | 8+1 | 9 |
| 14 | Pernik (Перник) | Pernik Province | 5 | 4+1 | 4 |
| 15 | Pleven (Плевен) | Pleven Province | 10 | 9+1 | 9 |
| 16 | Plovdiv (Пловдив) | Plovdiv municipality | 10 | 9+1 | 11 |
| 17 | Plovdiv (Пловдив) | Plovdiv Province, excl. Plovdiv | 11 | 10+1 | 11 |
| 18 | Razgrad (Разград) | Razgrad Province | 5 | 4+1 | 4 |
| 19 | Ruse (Русе) | Ruse Province | 8 | 7+1 | 8 |
| 20 | Silistra (Силистра) | Silistra Province | 4 | 4+1 | 4 |
| 21 | Sliven (Сливен) | Sliven Province | 7 | 6+1 | 6 |
| 22 | Smolyan (Смолян) | Smolyan Province | 4 | 4+1 | 4 |
| 23 | Sofia (София) | Vitosha, Sofia; Izgrev, Sofia; Krasno selo, Sofia; Lozenets, Sofia; Mladost, Sofia; Pancharevo, Sofia; Studentski, Sofia; Triaditsa, Sofia | 13 | 11+1 | 16 |
| 24 | Sofia (София) | Vazrazhdane, Sofia; Iskar, Sofia; Kremikovtsi, Sofia; Oborishte, Sofia; Poduyane, Sofia; Serdika, Sofia; Slatina, Sofia; Sredets, Sofia | 11 | 10+1 | 12 |
| 25 | Sofia (София) | Bankya, Sofia; Vrabnitsa, Sofia; Ilinden, Sofia; Krasna polyana, Sofia; Lyulin, Sofia; Nadezhda, Sofia; Novi Iskar, Sofia; Ovcha kupel, Sofia | 12 | 10+1 | 14 |
| 26 | Sofia (София) | Sofia Province | 8 | 7+1 | 8 |
| 27 | Stara Zagora (Стара Загора) | Stara Zagora Province | 11 | 10+1 | 11 |
| 28 | Targovishte (Търговище) | Targovishte Province | 4 | 4+1 | 4 |
| 29 | Haskovo (Хасково) | Haskovo Province | 8 | 7+1 | 8 |
| 30 | Shumen (Шумен) | Shumen Province | 6 | 5+1 | 6 |
| 31 | Yambol (Ямбол) | Yambol Province | 5 | 4+1 | 4 |

== Administrative Regions of Sofia ==
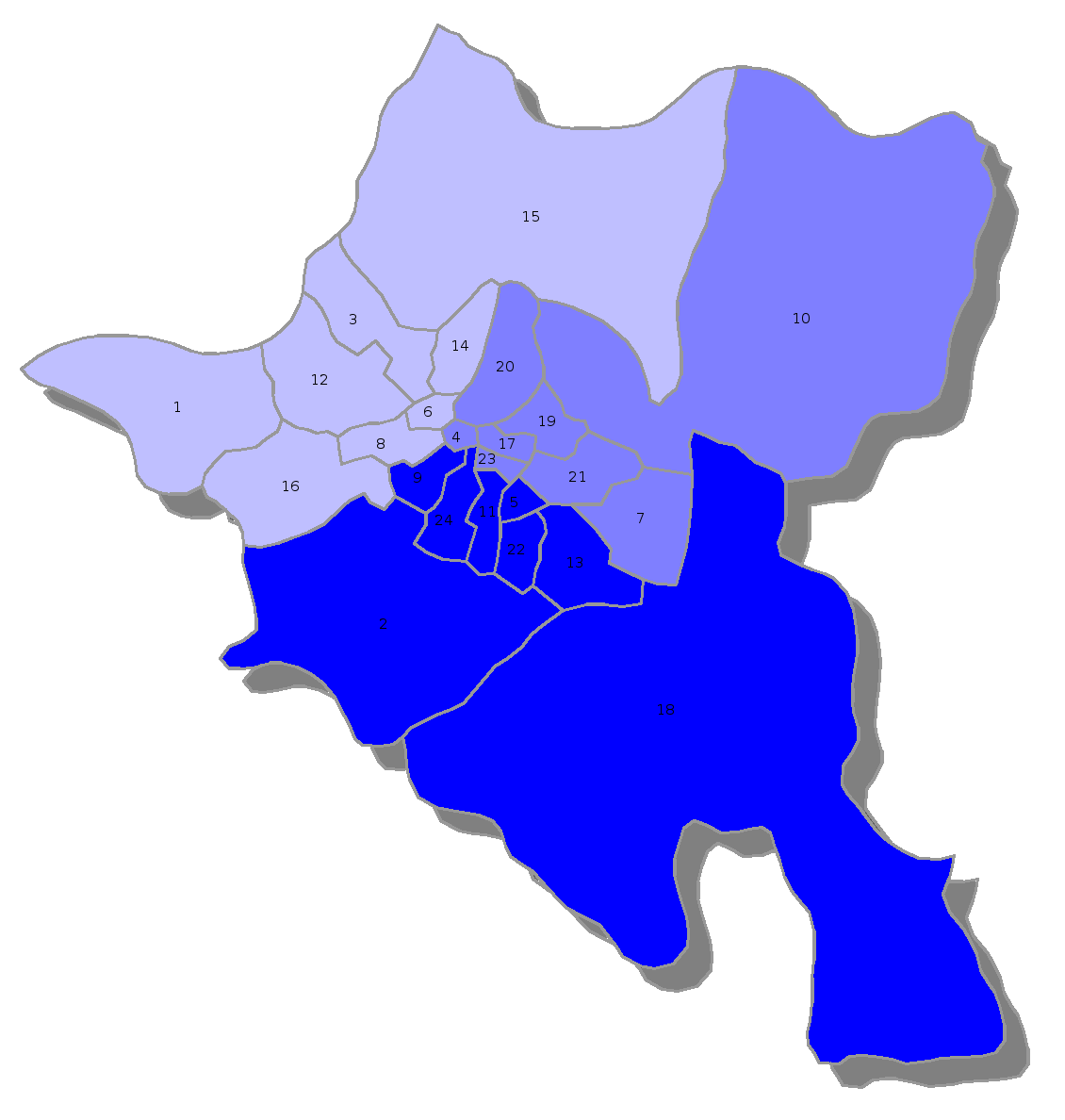
Electoral Regions in Sofia Electoral Region 23 Electoral Region 24 Electoral Region 25

The City of Sofia is divided into 24 Administrative regions. Electoral regions 23, 24 and 25 cover 8 Administrative regions each.

| # | Administrative Region | Electoral Region |
|---|---|---|
| 1 | Bankya (Банкя) | 25 |
| 2 | Vitosha (Витоша) | 23 |
| 3 | Vrabnitsa (Връбница) | 25 |
| 4 | Vazrazhdane (Възраждане) | 24 |
| 5 | Izgrev (Изгрев) | 23 |
| 6 | Ilinden (Илинден) | 25 |
| 7 | Iskar (Искър) | 24 |
| 8 | Krasna polyana (Красна поляна) | 25 |
| 9 | Krasno selo (Красно село) | 23 |
| 10 | Kremikovtsi (Кремиковци) | 24 |
| 11 | Lozenets (Лозенец) | 23 |
| 12 | Lyulin (Люлин) | 25 |
| 13 | Mladost (Младост) | 23 |
| 14 | Nadezhda (Надежда) | 25 |
| 15 | Novi Iskar (Нови Искър) | 25 |
| 16 | Ovcha kupel (Овча купел) | 25 |
| 17 | Oborishte (Оборище) | 24 |
| 18 | Pancharevo (Панчарево) | 23 |
| 19 | Poduyane (Подуяне) | 24 |
| 20 | Serdika (Сердика) | 24 |
| 21 | Slatina (Слатина) | 24 |
| 22 | Studentski (Студентски) | 23 |
| 23 | Sredets (Средец) | 24 |
| 24 | Triaditsa (Триадица) | 23 |
