= Districts of Sofia =

Divisions of the capital of Bulgaria

Sofia is the capital and largest city of Bulgaria. Politically, administratively and economically, Bulgaria is a highly centralised state. Sofia Municipality is the only municipality in Sofia City Province, distinct from Sofia Province, which surrounds but does not include the capital itself. Besides the city proper, the 24 districts of Sofia Municipality encompass three other towns and 34 villages. Each has its own district mayor elected in a popular election. The head of the Sofia Municipality is its mayor. The assembly members are chosen every four years. The current mayor of Sofia is Vassil Terziev

#	Name	Idle	Popul.	Type
1	Bankya	10.4	9,186	Town
2	Vitosha	3.5	42,953	Suburb
3	Vrabnitsa	4.6	47,417	Urban
4	Vazrazhdane	5.3	47,794	Urban
5	Izgrev	3.1	33,611	Urban
6	Ilinden	4.5	37,256	Urban
7	Iskar	3.9	69,896	Urban
8	Krasna polyana	9.2	65,442	Urban
9	Krasno selo	3.7	72,302	Urban
10	Kremikovtsi	5.8	23,599	Suburb
11	Lozenets	3.3	45,630	Urban
12	Lyulin	5.4	120,897	Urban
13	Mladost	4.2	110,852	Urban
14	Nadezhda	3.8	77,000	Urban
15	Novi Iskar	4.5	26,544	Town
16	Ovcha kupel	3.8	47,380	Urban
17	Oborishte	2.8	36,000	Urban
18	Pancharevo	5.3	24,342	Suburb
19	Poduene	4.5	85,996	Urban
20	Serdika	3.6	52,918	Urban
21	Slatina	4.1	65,772	Urban
22	Studentski	2.9	50,368	Urban
23	Sredets	4.0	41,000	Urban
24	Triaditsa	3.7	65,000	Urban
	TOTAL	4.5	1,299,155	
