= 24th Multi-member Constituency =

Bulgarian constituency

Coordinates: 42°43′15″N 23°22′42″E

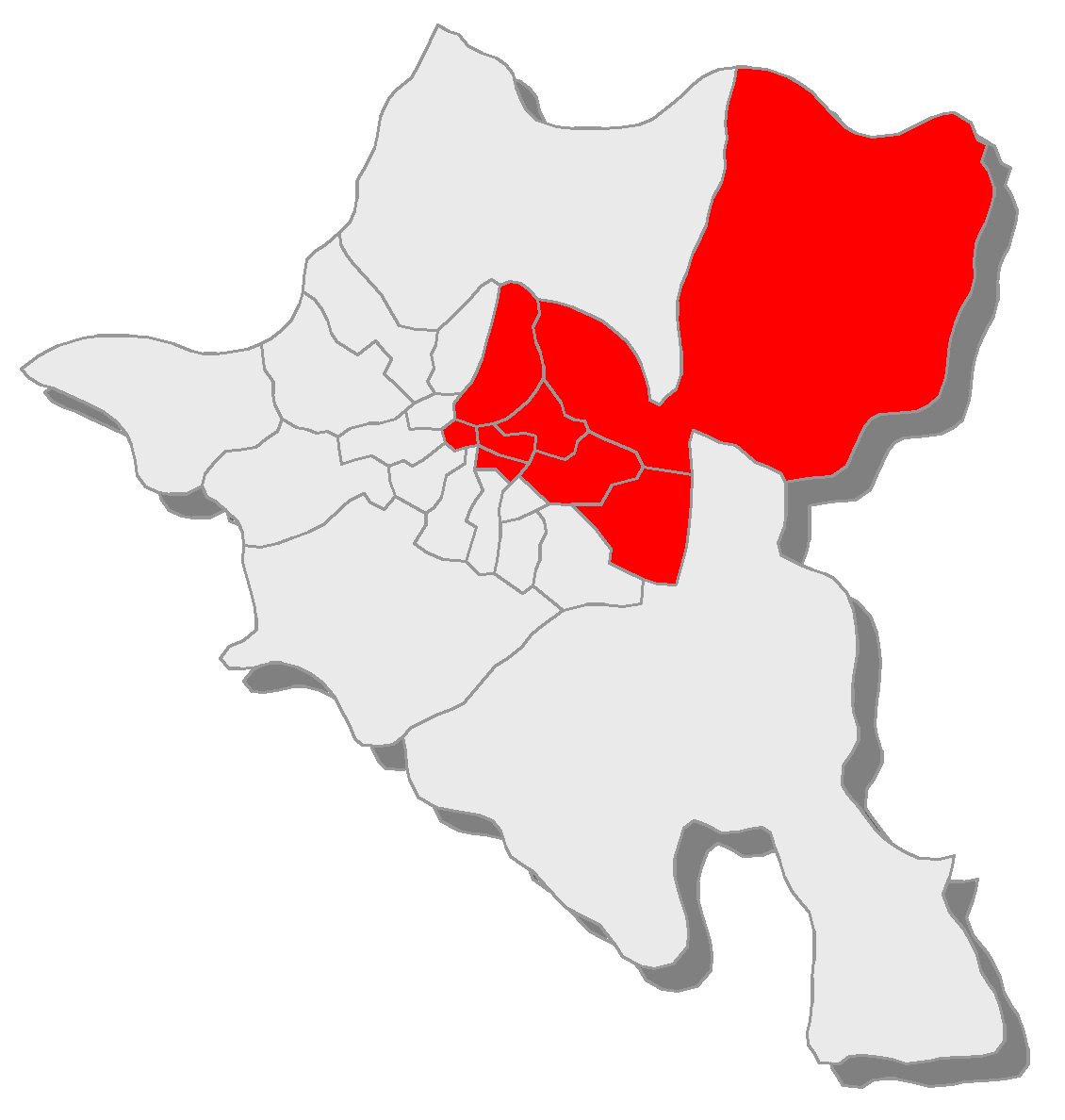
24th electoral district within Sofia Municipality

The 24th Multi-member Constituency (Bulgarian: 24-ти многомандатен избирателен район) is one of Bulgaria's 31 electoral districts. It comprises several districts in eastern and central Sofia, including Sredets, Oborishte, Vazrazhdane, Iskar, Kremikovtsi, Poduyane, Serdika, and Slatina.

== Members in the Bulgarian National Assembly ==
Name	Party	Notes
Stefan Belchev	Progressive Bulgaria	
Ivan Demerdzhiev	Progressive Bulgaria	
Alexandra Vulcheva	Progressive Bulgaria	
Vassil Goranov	Progressive Bulgaria	
Ivan Yanev	Progressive Bulgaria	
Vladimir Rakov	Progressive Bulgaria	
Nelly Andreeva	Progressive Bulgaria	
Ivaylo Mirchev	We Continue the Change – Democratic Bulgaria	
Anna Bodakova	We Continue the Change – Democratic Bulgaria	
Martin Dimitrov	We Continue the Change – Democratic Bulgaria	
Velislav Velichkov	We Continue the Change – Democratic Bulgaria	
Delyan Dobrev	GERB	
Yordanka Fandakova	GERB	
Hristo Gadzhev	GERB	
Petar Petrov	Revival	

== See also ==
- 2026 Bulgarian parliamentary election
- Politics of Bulgaria
- List of Bulgarian Constituencies
