= Raion =

Administrative division in several countries

A raion (Russian: район), also spelt rayon, is a type of administrative unit of several post-Soviet states. The term is used for both a type of subnational entity and a division of a city. The word is from the French rayon (meaning 'honeycomb, department'), and is commonly translated as 'district' in English.

A raion is a standardized administrative entity across most of the former Soviet Union and is usually a subdivision two steps below the national level, such as a subdivision of an oblast. However, in smaller USSR republics, it could be the primary level of administrative division. After the fall of the Soviet Union, some of the republics kept the raion (e.g. Azerbaijan, Belarus, Ukraine, Russia, Moldova, Kazakhstan, Kyrgyzstan) while others dropped it (e.g. Georgia, Uzbekistan, Estonia, Latvia, Armenia, Tajikistan, Turkmenistan).

In Bulgaria, it refers to an internal administrative subdivision of a city not related to the administrative division of the country as a whole, or, in the case of Sofia municipality a subdivision of that municipality.

== Etymology ==
The word raion is derived from French rayon, which is itself derived from Frankish *hrātu 'honeycomb'. It is used in many languages spanning Central Europe to Central Asia and Siberia. For instance, Azerbaijani: rayon; Belarusian: раён, romanized: rajon; Bulgarian: район, romanized: rajon; Georgian: რაიონი, romanized: raioni; German: Rayon; Ingrian: raijona; Latvian: rajons; Lithuanian: rajonas; Polish: rejon; Romanian: raion; Russian: район, romanized: raion; Turkish: reyon; Ukrainian: район, romanized: rajon; Uyghur: رايون, romanized: rayon; and Yakut: оройуон, romanized: oroyuon.

== List of countries with raion subdivisions ==
Fourteen countries have or had entities that were named "raion" or the local version of it.

Country	From	Until	Local name	Comment	Details
Abkhazia (partially recognised state)		(existing)	araion (араион)	inherited from the Abkhaz ASSR	Districts of Abkhazia
Armenia		1995		inherited from the Armenian SSR	Districts of the Armenian Soviet Socialist Republic
Austria		~ 1918	Rayon, Rajon	Used only by the k.k. Gendarmerie to designate police districts ("Behördenrayon", lit. authorities' raion).	
Azerbaijan		(existing)	rayon, pl. rayonlar;	inherited from the Azerbaijan SSR	Districts of Azerbaijan
Belarus		(existing)	Belarusian: раён, rajon	inherited from the Byelorussian SSR	Districts of Belarus
Bulgaria		(existing)	район, pl. райони (rayoni)	raions are subdivisions of three biggest cities: Sofia, Plovdiv and Varna. Sofia is subdivided to 24 raions (Sofia districts), Plovdiv - 6, Varna - 5 raions	
China		(existing)	行政分区	restricted to the Xinjiang Uygur Autonomous Region as influenced by the USSR. The districts of Ürümqi City and Karamay City are called رايون (SASM/GNC/SRC and ULY: rayon) in Uyghur.	
Crimea (Republic of Crimea - short lived Republic recognized by only a few UN member states)	2014-03-16	2014-03-16		inherited from Ukraine. The Republic is now split into the federal subjects of Russia named Republic of Crimea and Sevastopol	
Estonia	1950	1990	Estonian: rajoon, pl. rajoonid	used in the Estonian SSR. In 1990, transformed into counties (Estonian: maakond)	Counties of Estonia
Georgia		2006	Georgian: რაიონი raioni	inherited from the Georgian SSR; 2006 as first-level entities reorganized into municipalities. A raioni remains a territorial subdivision of Georgia's capital, Tbilisi.	List of municipalities in Georgia (country)
Kazakhstan		(existing)	Russian: райо́н	inherited from the Kazakh SSR	Districts of Kazakhstan
Latvia		2009-07-01	rajons; pl. rajoni	inherited from the Latvian SSR	Districts of Latvia
Lithuania		1994	Lithuanian: rajonas	inherited from the Lithuanian SSR. In 1994 transformed into district municipalities (Lithuanian: rajono savivaldybė)	Municipalities of Lithuania
Moldova		(existing)	Romanian: raion	introduced in administrative reform in 2003	Districts of Moldova
Romania		1968-02-16	Romanian: raion	one of the Administrative divisions of the People's Republic of Romania	Districts of the People's Republic of Romania
Russian Federation		(existing)	Russian: райо́н	inherited from the Russian SFSR	Districts of Russia
South Ossetia-Alania (partially recognised state)		(existing)		inherited from the South Ossetian AO	Districts of South Ossetia
Soviet Union		1991-12-26 (end of entity)		At various levels below the constituent republics.	
Transnistria (breakaway territory; de jure part of Moldova)		(existing)		inherited from the Moldavian SSR	Raions of Transnistria
Ukraine		(existing)	Ukrainian: райо́н	490 raions were inherited from the Ukrainian SSR, which were replaced by 136 new raions in 2020. Major Ukrainian cities are also subdivided into raions, constituting a total of 118 nationwide.	Raions of Ukraine

== History ==
=== Raions in the Soviet Union ===
In the Soviet Union, raions were administrative divisions created in the 1920s to reduce the number of territorial divisions inherited from the Russian Empire and to simplify their bureaucracies. The process of conversion to the system of raions was called raionirovanie ("regionalization"). It was started in 1923 in the Urals, North Caucasus, and Siberia as a part of the Soviet administrative reform and continued through 1929, by which time the majority of the country's territory was divided into raions instead of the old volosts and uyezds.

The concept of raionirovanie was met with resistance in some republics, especially in Ukraine, where local leaders objected to the concept of raions as being too centralized in nature and ignoring the local customs. This point of view was backed by the Soviet Russian People's Commissariat of Nationalities. Nevertheless, eventually all of the territory of the Soviet Union was regionalized.

Soviet raions had self-governance in the form of an elected district council (raysovet) and were headed by the local head of administration, who was either elected or appointed.

=== Raions outside the Soviet Union ===
Following the model of the Soviet Union, raions were introduced in Bulgaria and Romania. In China the term is used in Uyghur in the Xinjiang Uyghur Autonomous Region.

In February 1968 the 177 raions of Romania were reconstituted into 39 counties (Romanian: județe) which was the administrative term used before the communist era. This was done partly for nationalist reasons and partly to centralize the power of Nicolae Ceaușescu.

=== Raions after the dissolution of the Soviet Union ===
After the dissolution of the Soviet Union, raions as administrative units continue to be used in Azerbaijan, Belarus, Moldova, Russia, and Ukraine.

They are also used in breakaway regions: Abkhazia, South Ossetia, Transnistria.

Set	Quantity	Comment
Districts of Abkhazia	7	first-level
Districts of Azerbaijan	59	first-level, 18 other entities at that level exist
Districts of Belarus	118	second-level below oblasts and Minsk City
Districts of Moldova	32	first-level, 5 other entities at that level exist
Districts of South Ossetia	4	first-level, 1 other entity at that level exists
Districts of Russia	1731 (Note: Including Crimea and Sevastopol.)	second-level below federal subjects
Districts of Transnistria	5	first-level
Districts of Ukraine	136 and 118 city raions	second-level, numbers as of 2020, including Sevastopol and Crimea

In Georgia they exist as districts in Tbilisi.

== Modern raions ==
=== Abkhazia ===
Abkhazia is divided into seven districts.

=== Belarus ===
In Belarus, raions (Belarusian: раён, rajon) are administrative units subordinated to oblasts. See also: Category:Districts of Belarus.

=== Bulgaria ===
In Bulgaria, raions are subdivisions of three biggest cities: Sofia, Plovdiv and Varna. Sofia is subdivided to 24 raions (Sofia districts), Plovdiv - 6, Varna - 5 raions.

=== Moldova ===
- Administrative divisions of Moldova

=== Ukraine ===
In Ukraine, there are a total of 136 raions which are the administrative divisions of oblasts (provinces) and the Autonomous Republic of Crimea. Major cities as well as the two national cities with special status (Kyiv and Sevastopol) are also subdivided into raions (constituting a total of 118 nationwide).
