= Electoral region =

Electoral region may refer to one of the following forms of constituency:

- Electoral region (Bulgaria), roughly corresponding to the 28 provinces (Bulgarian: Области, Oblasti) of Bulgaria
- Electoral region (Senedd)
- Electoral region (Scottish Parliament)
- Electoral regions of Western Australia (see Electoral districts of Western Australia),
