= Zlatev =

Zlatev, female form Zlateva (Bulgarian: Златев) is a Bulgarian surname. Notable people with the surname include:

- Asen Zlatev (born 1960), Bulgarian weightlifter
- Ivan Zlatev (born 1990), Bulgarian athlete
- Pencho Zlatev (1881–1948), Bulgarian general
- Spas Zlatev (born 1964), Bulgarian biathlete
- Stoyan Zlatev (born 1954), Bulgarian modern pentathlete
- Valentin Zlatev (born 1965), Bulgarian businessman
- Stanka Zlateva (born 1983), Bulgarian freestyle wrestler
- Svetla Zlateva (born 1952), Bulgarian sprinter
