= Abdulrahman al-Khalidi =

Saudi Arabian human rights activist (born 1993)

Abdulrahman al-Khalidi (Arabic: عبد الرحمن الخالدي; born 1993) is a Saudi Arabian human rights activist. After campaigning for the rights of prisoners as a student from 2011, al-Khalidi fled Saudi Arabia in 2013 following the Arab Spring. From exile, he became associated with dissidents including Jamal Khashoggi and Omar Abdulaziz. In 2021, al-Khalidi sought asylum in Bulgaria; the subsequent decision by the Bulgarian government to reject his application led to widespread condemnation from human rights groups.

== Activism ==
=== Within Saudi Arabia (2011–2013) ===
While studying law at university, al-Khalidi learned about breaches of prisoners' rights in Saudi Arabia, and began to campaign for the rights of people detained within the country's criminal justice system through his membership of the Saudi Civil and Political Rights Association. From 2011 to 2013, he took part in demonstrations in Riyadh advocating for the rights of detainees, in addition to calling for constitutional reform in the country. Following the outbreak of the Arab Spring, al-Khalidi also took part in protests in Eastern Province against the Saudi Arabian government.

=== In exile (2013–present) ===
After leaving Saudi Arabia in 2013, al-Khalidi continued to advocate for human rights reform in the country. He became an active member of the Bees Army, an opposition movement against government propaganda closely associated with Jamal Khashoggi and Omar Abdulaziz. Al-Khalidi also criticised the Saudi Arabian government in general, calling for the establishment of democracy in the country and for an investigation into crimes carried out by the government within Saudi Arabia and abroad.

== Asylum case ==
=== Detention (2021–present) ===
In 2013, al-Khalidi fled from Saudi Arabia, stating he feared for his and his family's safety following the government crackdown on the 2011–2012 protests, which al-Khalidi had participated in. After initially staying in Egypt and Qatar, al-Khalidi and his family settled in Turkey. As he continued to criticise the government from Turkey, al-Khalidi became the victim of attacks from pro-government trolls on social media, who labelled him a "traitor" who wanted to "destroy" Saudi Arabia.

In October 2018, Khashoggi was assassinated in the Saudi Arabian consulate in Istanbul. Al-Khalidi subsequently refused to go to the consulate in order to renew his identity documents due to concerns that he would also be killed or detained; the loss of valid documentation prevented al-Khalidi from accessing services within Turkey such as education and healthcare.

On 23 October 2021, al-Khalidi crossed the Bulgaria–Turkey border on foot with the intent to claim asylum within the European Union. He was subsequently arrested for entering Bulgaria without a visa, and was detained at the Busmantsi Special Facility for the Temporary Accommodation of Foreigners, near Sofia.

In 2022, al-Khalidi's asylum application was rejected by a court in Bulgaria, which ruled that Saudi Arabian authorities had taken steps to democratise society, and that al-Khalidi would no longer be at risk in the country. Al-Khalidi appealed the decision, and in September 2023, the Supreme Court of Cassation of Bulgaria ruled that his case had been marred by procedural errors, and ordered his application be reconsidered. Al-Khalidi gave interviews in which he stated he was at risk in Saudi Arabia, citing the case of his fellow activist Hassan al-Rabi, who had been deported from Morocco and had disappeared shortly after arriving in Saudi Arabia.

On 17 January 2024, an administrative court in Sofia accepted al-Khalidi's application and ordered his release. The State Agency for National Security (DANS) declined to do so, and on 22 January issued a statement rejecting his release, without providing a reason. On 26 January, a court upheld DANS' decision, stating that al-Khalidi was not a member of a group deemed to be at risk of persecution in Saudi Arabia, while the State Agency for Refugees also declined to revoke the ruling. On 7 February, DANS issued al-Khalidi with a deportation order, which he allegedly declined to sign due to it being written in Bulgaria.

On 4 April 2024, Human Rights Watch reported that on 31 March, al-Khalidi had been choked and beaten to the face and torso by law enforcement officers at the Busmantsi Special Facility after he attempted to give some food to a fasting family during Ramadan.

In July 2024 al-Khalidi went on hunger strike.

=== Response ===
Human Rights Watch called on the Bulgarian government not to deport al-Khalidi, stating that he was at risk of arbitrary detention, torture, and receiving an unfair trial if he returned to Saudi Arabia due to his status as a human rights activist.

Amnesty International called in March 2024 for a stop of the deportation and the release of al-Khalidi.

The Bulgarian Helsinki Committee wrote an open letter to the Minister of the Interior, Kalin Stoyanov, and the Chairperson of DANS, Plamen Tonchev, asking for them not to forcibly return al-Khalidi to Saudi Arabia in order to ensure his security and human rights, as well as to not tarnish Bulgaria's public image.

The United Nations Special Rapporteur on Human Rights Defenders, Mary Lawlor, said on X that al-Khalidi's deportation would be "extremely disturbing".

Lina al-Hathloul from the Saudi Arabian human rights organisation ALQST, who had visited al-Khalidi in detention, accused the Bulgarian government of arbitrarily detaining him, citing two prior court decisions that had ruled in his favour in 2023 and 2024, including one that had ordered his immediate release.

== Personal life ==
Al-Khalidi is married with two children.
