= Poduyane =

Poduyane Подуяне
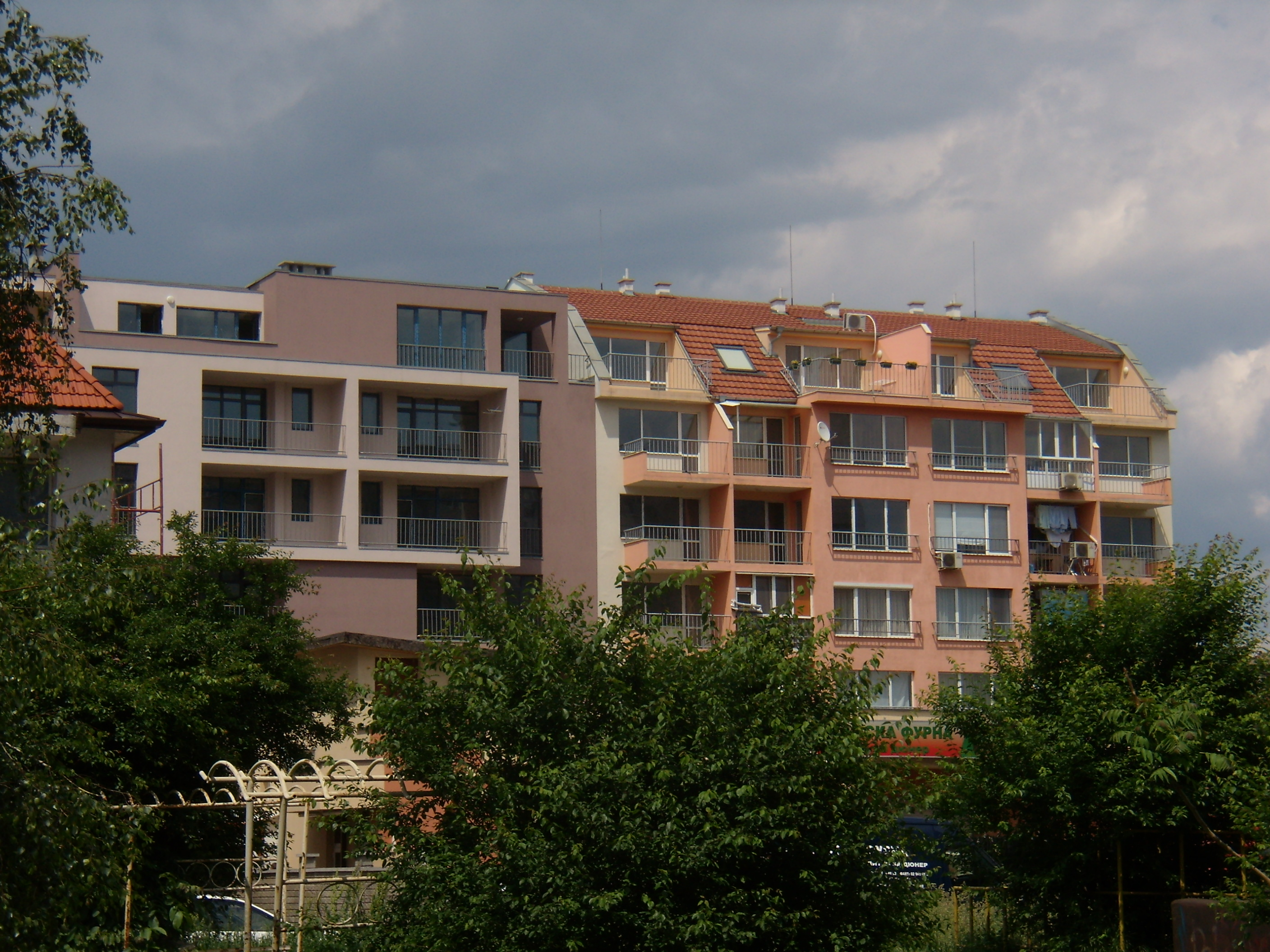
- Residential blocks in Hadzhi Dimitar neighbourhood.

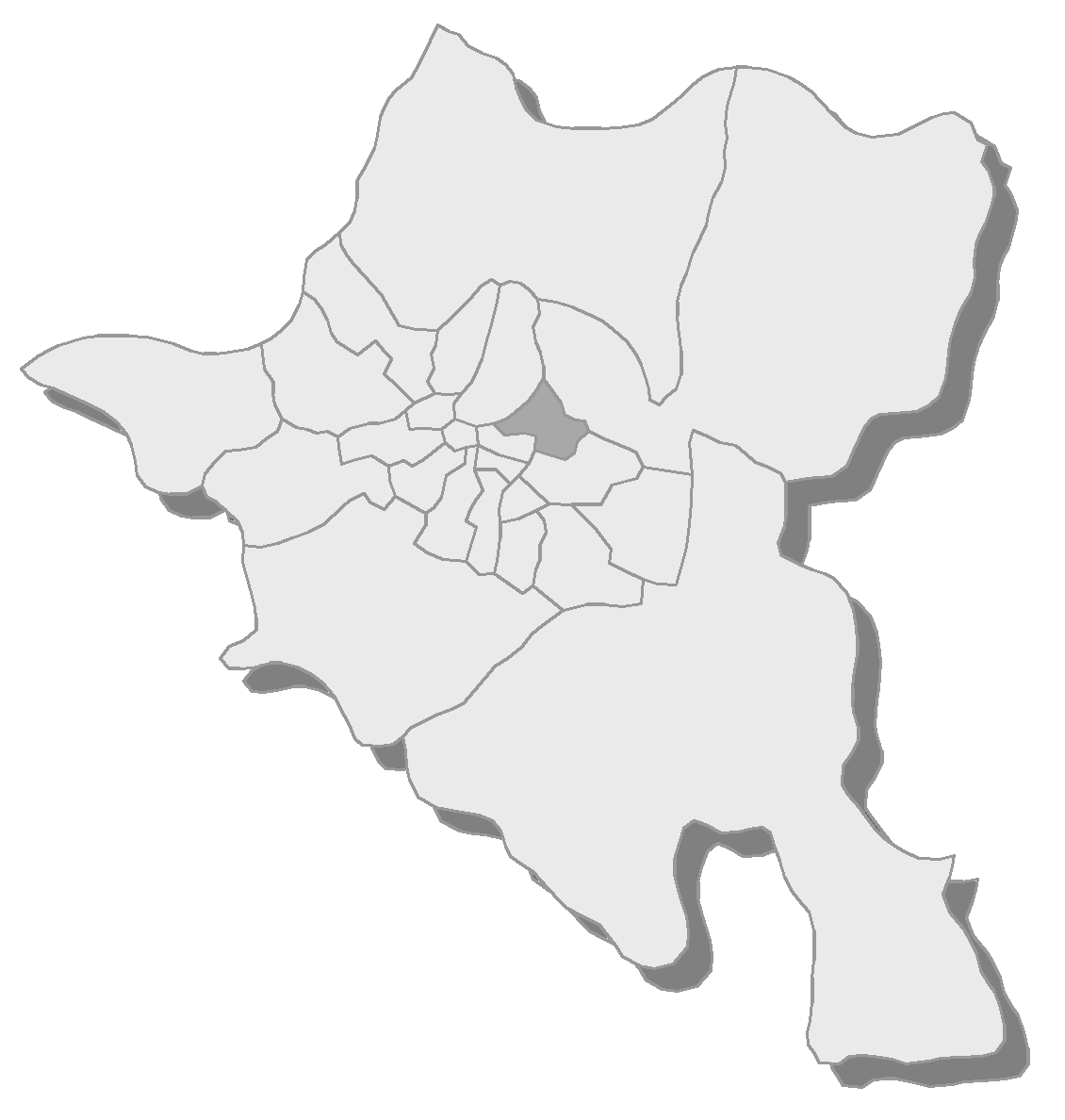
- Position of Poduyane in Sofia
- Coordinates: 42°42′N 23°22′E
- Country: Bulgaria
- City: Sofia

Government
  - Mayor: Eva Mitova GERB
- Elevation: 530 m (1,740 ft)

Population (01.01.2007)
  - Total: ▲85,996
- Time zone: UTC+2 (EET)
  - Summer (DST): UTC+3 (EEST)

Poduyane (Bulgarian: Подуяне [poˈdujɐnɛ]) or Poduene (Подуене [poˈdu.ɛnɛ]) is a residential complex and a district of Sofia, the capital of Bulgaria with 85,996 inhabitants. It is located in the northeastern outskirts of the city and is divided into microregions. Poduyane consists of the neighbourhoods Suhata Reka, Hadzhi Dimitar, Poduyane, Stefan Karadzha, Levski, Levski-G, Levski-V. A former village, it was incoroparted in 1895. The district's holiday is celebrated on 1 June.

== History ==
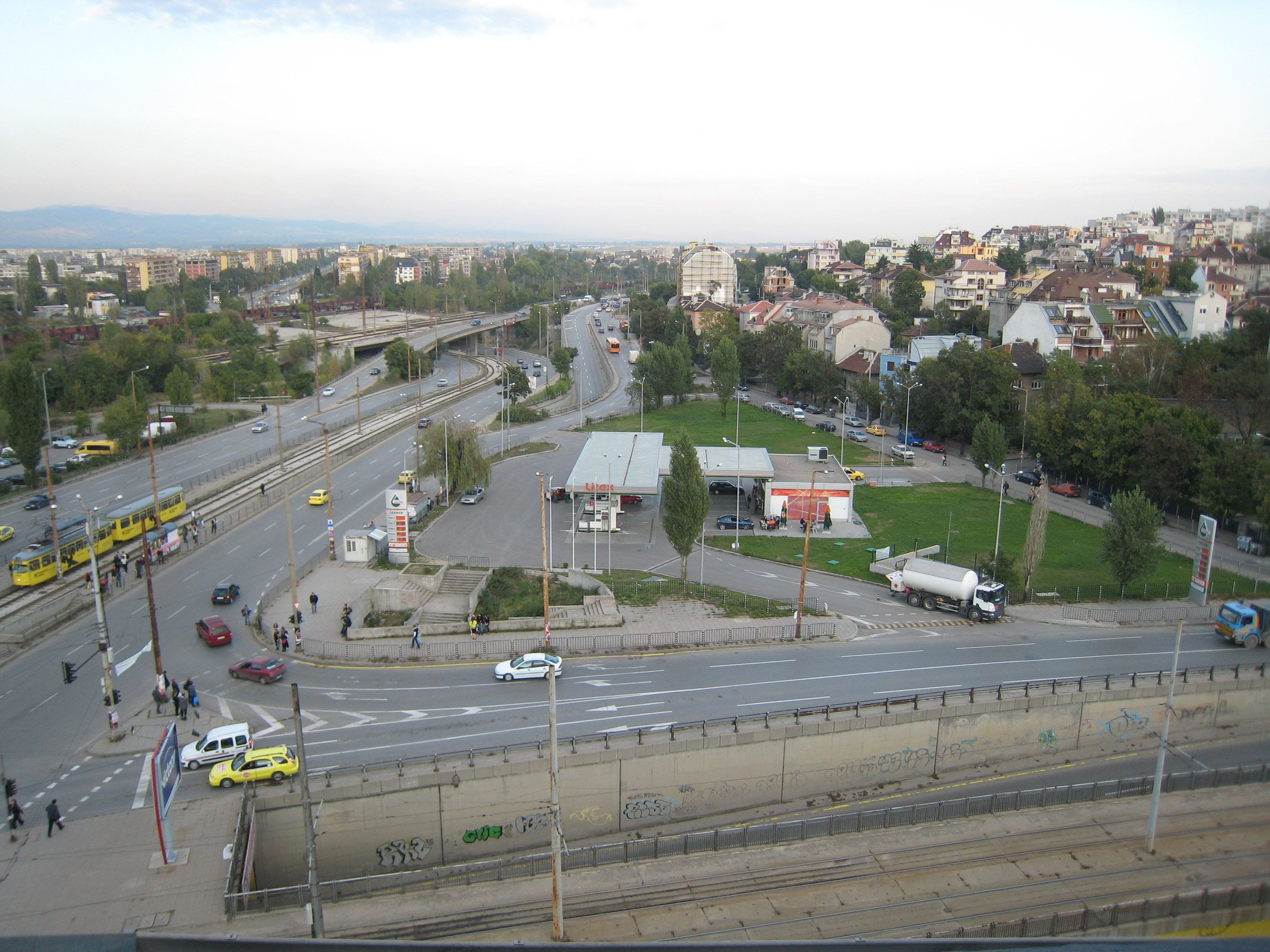
Poduyane crossroad

Poduene was first mentioned in 1453 as Poduyani. The name is derived from the word poduy, an adjective from pod ("soil") with the now-unproductive suffix –uy. In that case poduy was a geographical term referring to a high flat country or a plain country at the foot of a hill.

Poduene was the first village to be included within the city of Sofia in 1895 and was mentioned in the Elin Pelin works. In 1920s the neighbourhoods of Suha Reka and Hadzhi Dimitar were established and experienced a quick population growth mainly from north-western Bulgaria. Many streets are still named after villages from the region such as Gintsi, Todorini Kukli, Petrohan and others.

During socialism (1944-1989) Poduene along with two other districts (Oborishte and Slatina) formed the 5th district "Vasil Levski" of the capital. In the 1960s, 1970s and especially 1980s many panel blocks were constructed in the neighbourhoods of Suha Reka, Hadzhi Dimitar, Poduene and Stefan Karadzha. In the end of the 1980s a new neighbourhood Metalurg was built and in 1999 it was renamed to Levski V and G after its incorporation into Poduene from Kremikovtsi.

== Population ==
As of 2007 Poduene has 85,996 inhabitants which makes it the third most populous district in Sofia after Lyulin and Mladost. According to the 2001 census the population was 75,004 - 25,000 lived in Hadzhi Dimitar and Stefan Karadzha; 25,000 in Suha Reka and Poduyane (neighbourhood); 15,000 in Levski V and G and 10,000 in Levski.

There is an art college, 11 schools and 9 kindergartens as well as two polyclinics: 23rd and 18th. In the Suha Reka neighbourhood is located Georgi Asparuhov Stadium (also known as Gerena) home of PFC Levski Sofia.

== Transport ==
Poduyane railway station is located within the district.

== Territorial structure ==
The district of Poduene is surrounded by railways. The main railway is the international one which separates the district from the center. There are two rivers, Perlovska and Slatinska, while the Vladayska river serves as administrative border with Serdika. The Vladimir Vazov Boulevard which follows the Perlovska river divides the district into two parts:

- North-western - the neighbourhoods of Hadzhi Dimitar, Stefan Karadzja and Levski-G
- South-eastern - the neighbourhoods of Poduene, Suhata Reka, Levski and Levski-V

There are two mixed neighbourhoods with blocks and houses - Hadzhi Dimitar and Suhata Reka, two neighbourhoods with blocks - Levski V and G and one neighbourhood with houses - Levski. Poduene can be considered as part of Suhata Reka while Stefan Karadszha forms part of Hadzhi Dimitar.

== Honour ==
Poduene Glacier on Danco Coast, Antarctica is named after Poduene.
