= Strawberry House =

- Къщата с ягодите (in Bulgarian)
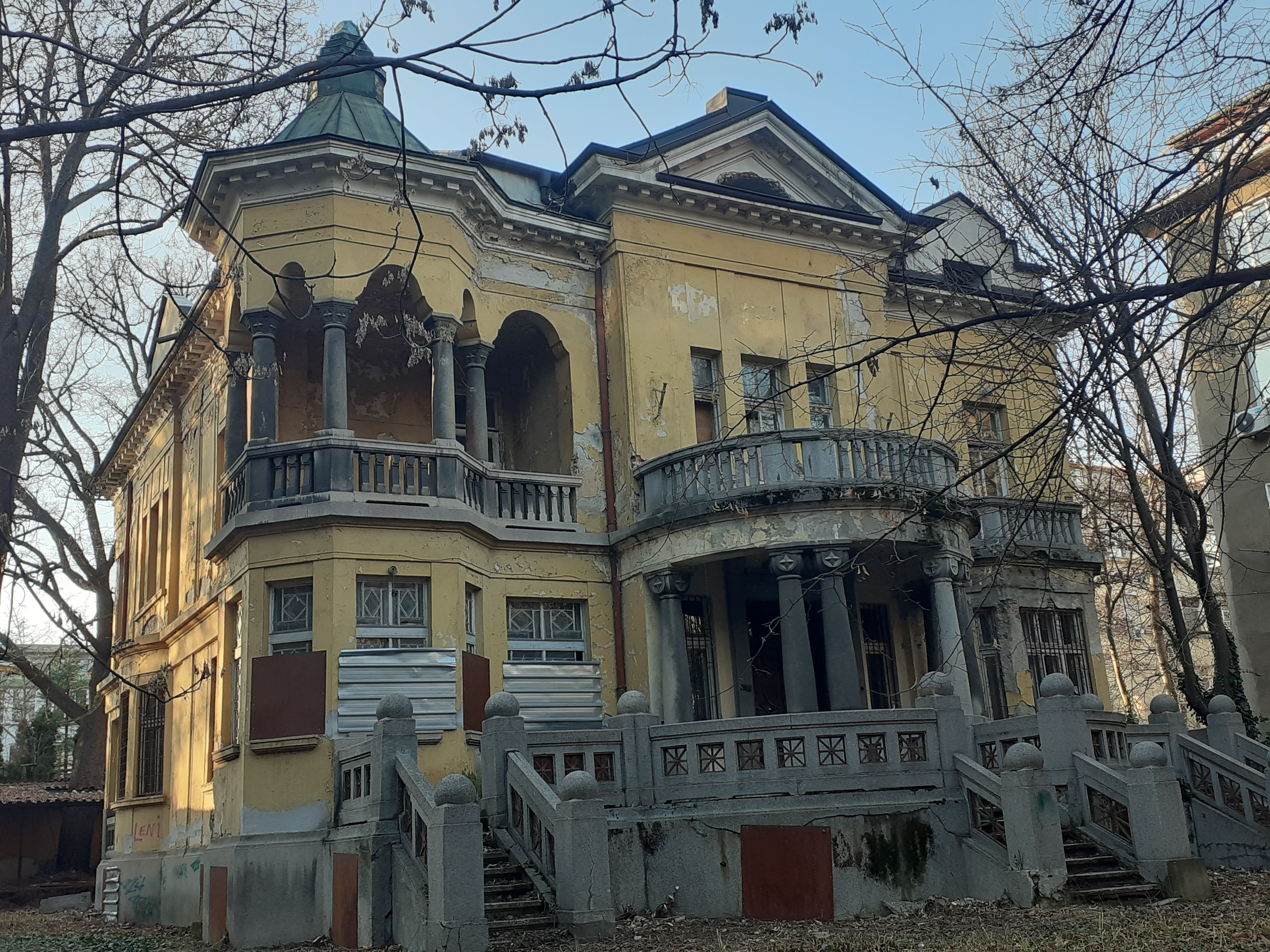
- The decrepit Strawberry House in 2021
- Interactive map of the Strawberry House area

General information
- Type: house
- Architectural style: Jugendstil, Art Deco
- Location: Sofia, Bulgaria
- Coordinates: 42°41′43″N 23°20′22″E
- Construction started: 1927
- Completed: 1930

Design and construction
- Architect: Georgi Kunev

The Strawberry House or House with the Strawberries (Bulgarian: Къщата с ягодите, Kashtata s yagodite) is a historic house in Sofia, the capital of Bulgaria. Built in 1927–30, the Strawberry House has been listed as a monument of culture of local importance, but is currently decrepit. The house is one of the most prominent examples of an elite 1920s single-family dwelling in Sofia.

The Strawberry House stands at 6 San Stefano Street in the central Sofia district of Oborishte. It was designed by Georgi Kunev, a Bulgarian architect educated in Vienna and Karlsruhe, for banker Dimitar Ivanov and his wife Nadezhda Stankovich. The house's design combines influences from Jugendstil, Art Deco and romantic features from vernacular Bulgarian architecture. The interior of the house includes five bedrooms, a cellar, a drawing room with a red-marble fireplace and a music stage. The house's nickname comes from the strawberry bushes that were once planted in its front yard.

After the 1944 Bulgarian coup d'état, the Strawberry House was nationalized. It was used as an embassy of Romania and a Soviet trade representative office. It was listed as a monument of culture in 1978 and returned to the descendants of the Ivanov family in the 1990s. They sold the property to Lukoil Neftohim Burgas executive Valentin Zlatev in 2004. Zlatev's attempts to demolish and replace it were blocked due to public outcry. In December 2024, Zlatev sold the Strawberry House to SiteGround owner Tenko Nikolov, who has expressed an intention to restore it.
