= The Bees Army =

Saudi Arabian opposition movement

The Bees Army or Geish al-Nahl (Arabic: جيش النحل), also called the "Electronic Bees", refers to an opposition movement aimed at confronting what the movement describes as Saudi Arabian government propaganda. The movement consisted of 600 members as of 2018 and was supported by Jamal Khashoggi, who was assassinated by agents of the Saudi government. In May 2021, the Saudi Arabian authorities commenced an arrest campaign to detain the people whom were claimed to be the members of the movement.

== Background ==
According to researchers and activists there is a "sprawling web of loyalist social media accounts", consisted of real people and bots, that get activated in favor of the Saudi Kingdom repeatedly in times of crisis. Marc Owen Jones, a researcher and lecturer at the University of Exeter who has followed the Saudi Kingdom's pro-government online activities since 2016 said that "a correlation between the amount of negative press coverage and the pace of their [online] activities" could be drawn. He described the pro-government group as working harder "when they're doing damage control." Saudi opposition activists have labeled these pro-government accounts as the "flies". As supervised by Saud Al-Qahtani, a close associate of Mohammed bin Salman. The Saudi troll farms would flood the Twitter accounts of journalists, activists, and others who were critical of the Saudi Arabian regime with harassment and "pro-regime propaganda", so influencing Saudi Twitter towards the government's desired agenda. Hence, the bees are referred to the accounts that confront these pro-Saudi accounts.

Journalist Jamal Khashoggi had announced the coming of the Bees on Twitter days before being assassinated. On 12 September 2018, he made an explicit reference to this online counter-movement on Twitter tweeting, "What do you know about bees."

== The movement ==
The movement is defined by Elias Groll as "a network of pro-democracy activists who would post and amplify one another’s messages about Saudi political issues." According to Omar Abdulaziz, a Saudi activist, the Bees would "talk about the dissidents, the political prisoners, freedom of speech, human rights." Abdulaziz said in an interview that Khashoggi had made a $5,000 donation to the Bees movement. He further explained that they had planned to buy SIM cards with Canadian and American numbers so that Saudis could use inside the Saudi Arabia kingdom "without fear of being exposed and punished." The first SIM cards were reportedly funded by Khashoggi.

Abdulaziz said he had received warnings from Saudi Arabia regarding the Bees. This movement is also described as "offering cyber protection to Saudi activists needing a safe platform to speak out in the oppressive Kingdom".

== In the media ==
The movement is described in the documentary The Dissident, directed by Bryan Fogel.

== Notable members ==
- Jamal Khashoggi
- Omar Abdulaziz
- Abdulrahman al-Khalidi
