= Nadezhda, Sofia =

District in Sofia, Bulgaria

Nadezhda Надежда
- District of Sofia
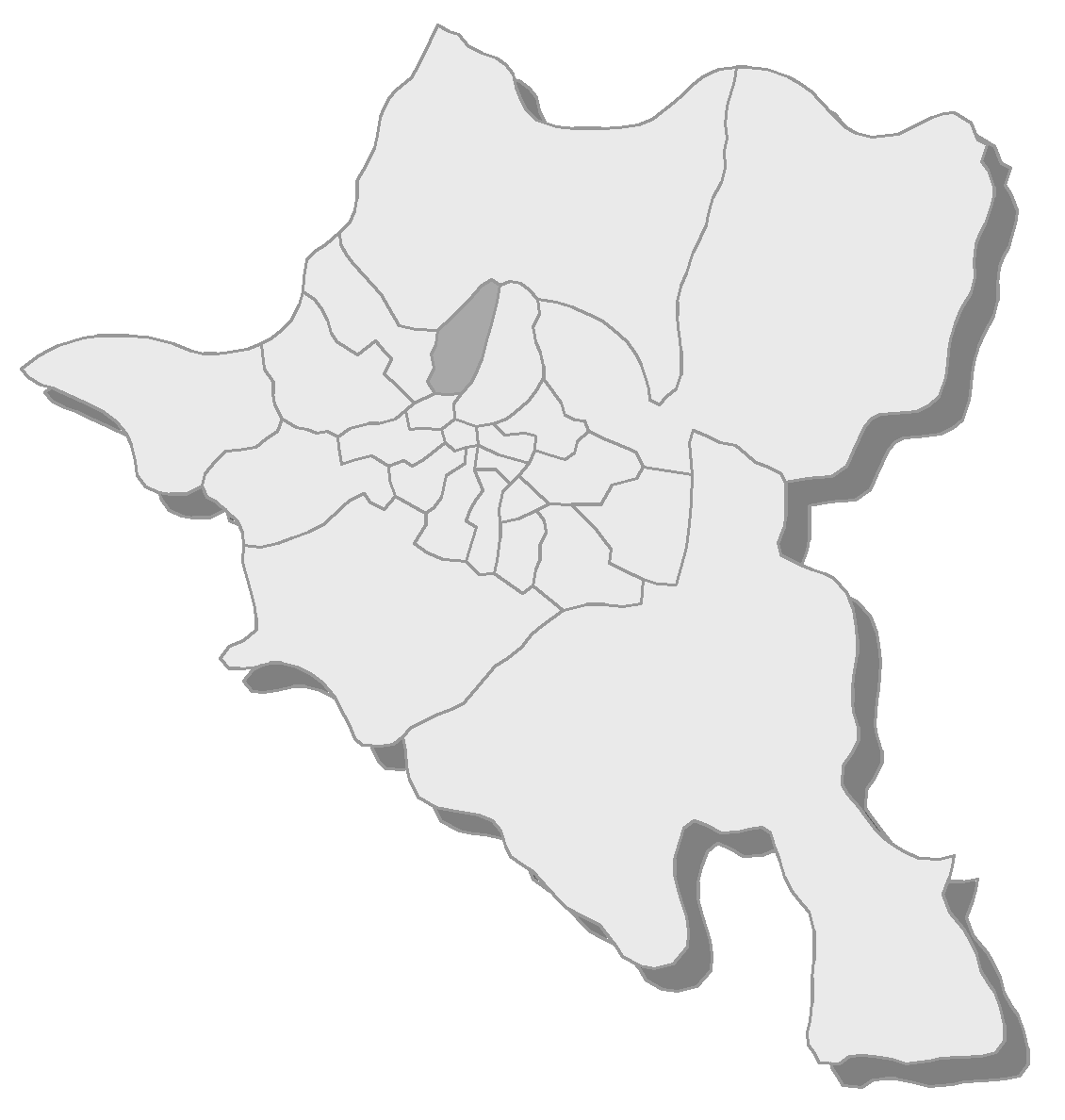
- Location of Nadezhda in Sofia Municipality
- Coordinates: 42°43′57″N 23°17′55″E
- Country: Bulgaria
- Province: Sofia City
- Municipality: Stolichna

Nadezhda (Bulgarian: Надежда [nɐˈdɛʒdɐ], lit. 'hope') is a district located it the north-western parts of Sofia with an area of 19.300 sq. km. As of 2011 it has 67,905 inhabitants. It includes nine neighbourhoods: "Nadezhda" I, II, III and IV; "Tolstoy"; "Svoboda"; "Triagalnika"; "Iliyantsi" and "Trebich".

In 1906 there were only a few houses in the area where the road from Sofia to Lom passed through the fertile fields. Nadezhda received a neighbourhood status in 1924 and from September 1934 it became a centre of a municipality which included several villages. It derived its name from Tsar Boris III's youngest sister, Nadezhda.

There are many manufacturing plants. The main industrial activities are machinery, electronics, chemical, pharmaceutical (Sopharma plant), furniture and others.

Nadezhda has two churches and a monastery. There are 13 schools, 13 kindergartens, 6 chitalishta.

The name "Nadezhda" is symbolic in that it is also the name of one of the three daughters of the city's patron saint - Saint Sophia (the three daughters were called Faith, Hope and Love).
