= Busmantsi =

Village in Sofia City Province, Bulgaria

Busmantsi Бусманци
- Village
- Location within Bulgaria
- Coordinates: 42°41′N 23°26′E
- Country: Bulgaria
- Province: Sofia City

Population
  - Total: 1,619

Busmantsi (Bulgarian: Бусманци, also transcribed as Busmanci) is a village located in the Sofia City Province, western Bulgaria. It is part of the Iskar district in the municipality of Sofia, 8 km to the east of the City centre. As of 2006 it has 1,619 inhabitants.

The village is surrounded by agricultural lands and factories. There are no woods in the vicinity with the exception of the areas around the Iskar river.

Busmantsi is also the location of a detention center that was featured in the 2009 20th Century Fox horror film Wrong Turn 3.
