= Valentin Zlatev =

Bulgarian businessman

Personal details
- Born: 8 December 1965 (age 60) Pravets, Bulgaria
- Profession: Businessman

Valentin Zlatev (Bulgarian: Валентин Златев) (born 8 December 1965) is a Bulgarian businessman. He is a former representative of the Russian oil giant LUKoil and former president of basketball club Lukoil Akademik.

He is married to Lyuba Stefanova, who won the Miss Plovdiv competition in 2001, and they have three children – two sons named Vasil and Anton and a daughter named Kristina.

Between 2012 and 2024, Zlatev owned the derelict Strawberry House in Sofia.
