= Krasna Polyana =

District of Sofia, Bulgaria

Krasna Polyana Красна Поляна
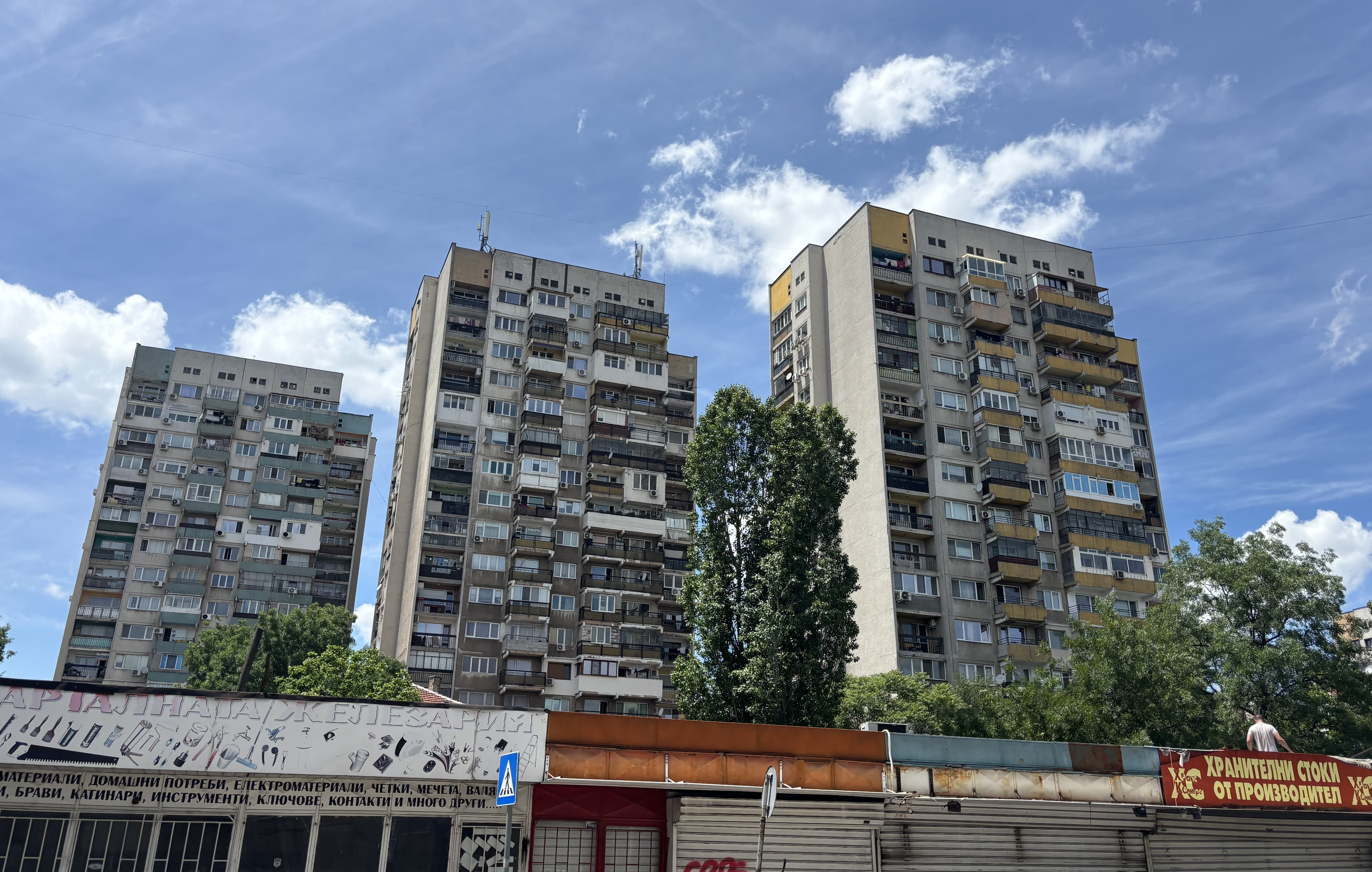

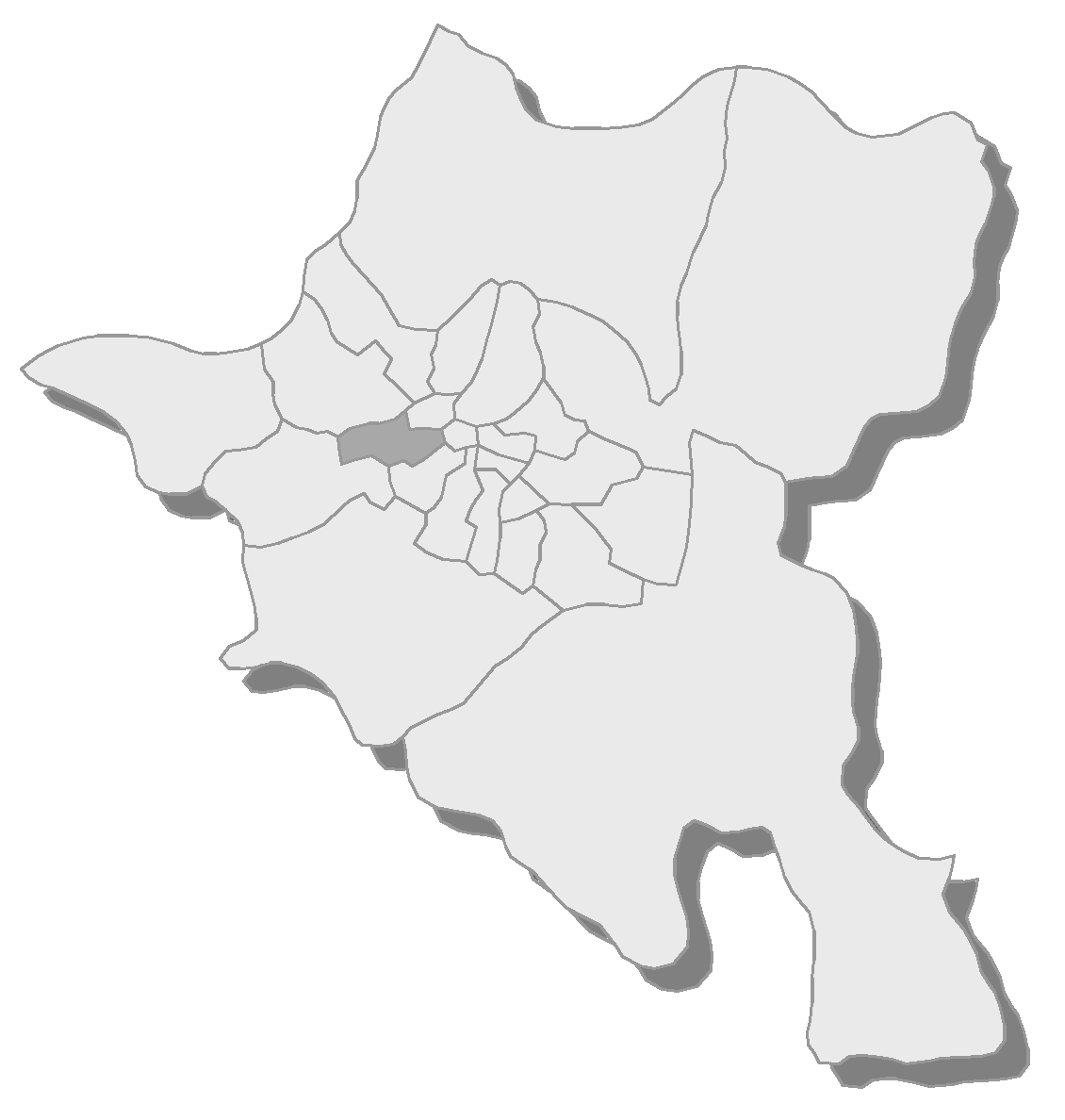
- Location of Krasna Polyana in Sofia
- Interactive map of Krasna Polyana
- Coordinates: 42°42′N 23°15′E
- Country: Bulgaria
- City: Sofia

Government
  - Mayor: Ivan Chakarov (GERB)

Area
  - Total: 9.2 km^{2} (3.6 sq mi)

Population (2021)
  - Total: 60,418
- Time zone: UTC+2 (EET)
  - Summer (DST): UTC+3 (EEST)
- Website: krasnapolyana.bg

Krasna Polyana (Bulgarian: Красна Поляна [ˈkrasnɐ poˈʎanɐ]) is an administrative district in the western part of Sofia. As of 2023, it had 60,418 inhabitants. It is one of the 24 city districts, about 3 km from the city center, and includes six neighbourhoods: "Ilinden"; "Zapaden Park"; "Razsadnika"; "Krasna Polyana" 1, 2, 3. There are many green areas, especially in the neighbourhood of "Zapaden Park", as the name suggests.

Although located close to central Sofia, Krasna Polyana is generally regarded as one of the city's less affluent districts, with comparatively poorer public infrastructure and social challenges, especially near the adjacent Fakulteta neighbourhood.
