= Vazrazhdane =

District of Sofia, Bulgaria

Coordinates: 42°41′58″N 23°18′34″E

Vazrazhdane Възраждане
- District of Sofia
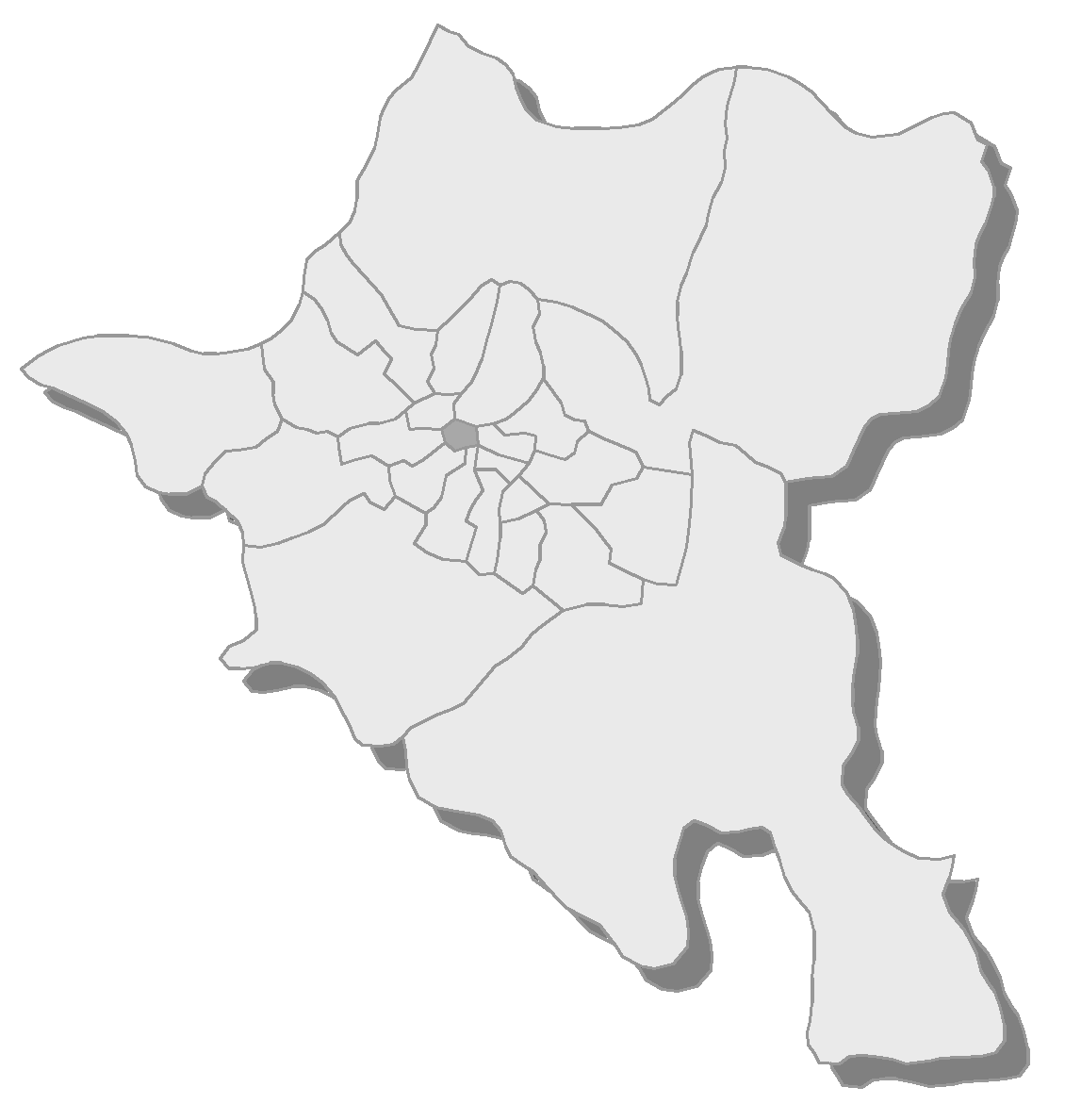
- Location of Vazrazhdane in Sofia Municipality
- Country: Bulgaria
- Province: Sofia City
- Municipality: Stolichna

Vazrazhdane (Bulgarian: Възраждане [vɐzˈraʒdɐnɛ]) is a district in the centre of Sofia. As of 2012 it has 49,158 inhabitants. The district's area is 3.16 km^{2} (1 sq mi) or 2,5% of the total capital area. It has several neighbourhoods: the Zones B-2, B-3, B-4, B-5, B-18 and B-19 as well as Serdika. The territory of the regions is divided as follows: residential zone- 1.21 km^{2} (0 sq mi); parks, gardens and green zones- 1.36 km^{2} (1 sq mi); industrial zone- 0.15 km^{2} (0 sq mi); public zones including roads, squares and infrastructure- 0.43 km^{2} (0 sq mi).

There 17 elementary and high schools with 8,000 pupils; 7 kindergartens; 6 libraries. The district boasts three churches, the National Polytechnical Museum and several monuments.

The economy is very dynamic and is based on services, finance, government and industry. There are several hundred trade shops including the Mall of Sofia, several banks as well as government departments and ministries. The industrial sector contains non-polluting food-processing and shoe factories. The current unemployment is 5,3%.
