= Izgrev, Sofia =

District of Sofia, Bulgaria

Izgrev Изгрев
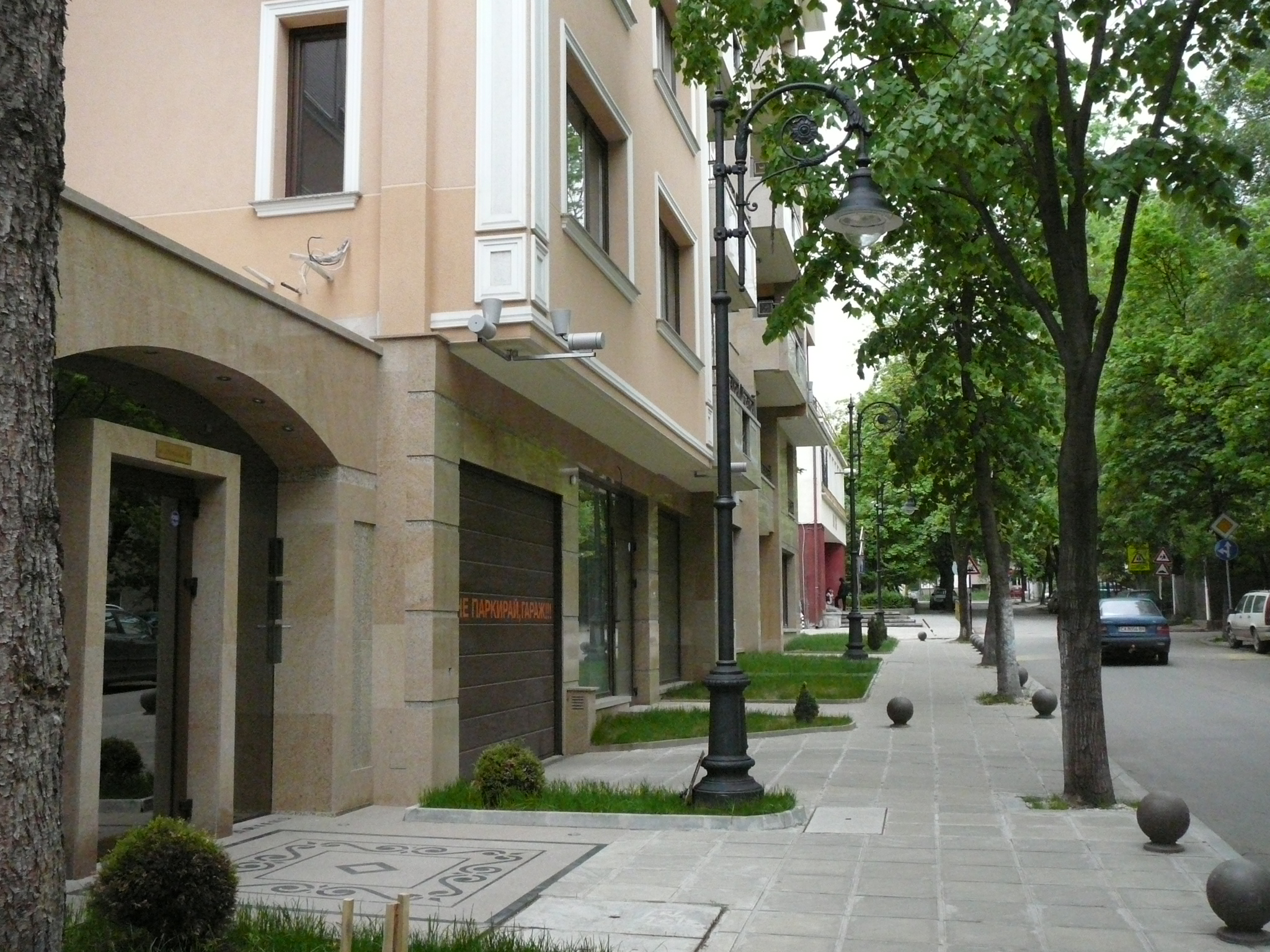
- A street in Izgrev District

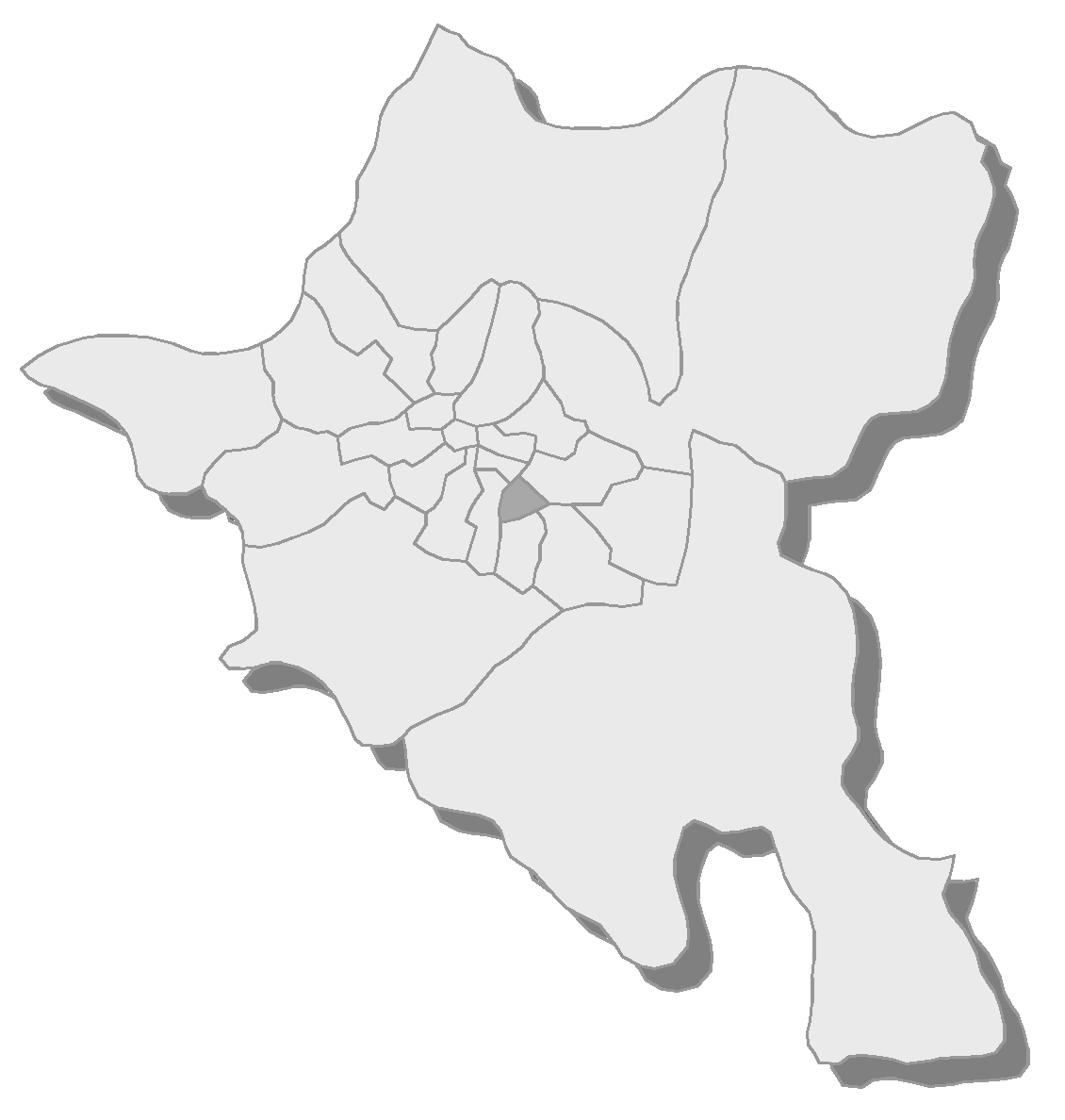
- Position of Izgrev in Sofia
- Interactive map of Izgrev
- Coordinates: 42°40′12″N 23°20′54″E
- Country: Bulgaria
- City: Sofia

Government
  - Mayor: Tsvetomir Zhekov

Area
  - Total: 4.2 km^{2} (1.6 sq mi)

Population (2011)
  - Total: 30,896
- Time zone: UTC+2 (EET)
  - Summer (DST): UTC+3 (EEST)
- Website: Official Site of Izgrev District

Izgrev (Bulgarian: Изгрев [ˈizɡrɛf], meaning "sunrise") is one of the 24 districts of Sofia. It has an area of about 4.2 km^{2} The population as of 2006 is 33,611. It includes three neighbourhoods: "Iztok" (pop. 15,600), "Dianabad" (14,000) and "Izgrev" (3,100). There are many parks and green spaces which cover around 42% of the municipal area making it one of the environmentally friendliest urban areas in Sofia. There are 17 foreign embassies.

The economy is dominated by services, trade, finance, industry and construction. There are 15 small and middle-size manufacturing plants and 2 large ones producing electrical and electronic equipment, machinery, metals and metal details. There are 340 trade sites which include the World Trade Centre "Interpred". The unemployment for 2004 is 3,1% and for 2006- 1,1% which is among the lowest in the capital and the nation.

The public infrastructure includes 12 schools, 9 kindergartens, 2 clinics, Hospital for active treatment of neurogy and psychiatry, 2 libraries. Other institutions structures include the Borisova Gradina TV Tower, National Sports Complex "Diana", Park-Hotel "Moskva" (Moscow), National Investigating Department, several TV headquarters, Yug (South) Bus Station and others.
