= Ilinden, Sofia =

District of Sofia, Bulgaria

Ilinden Илинден
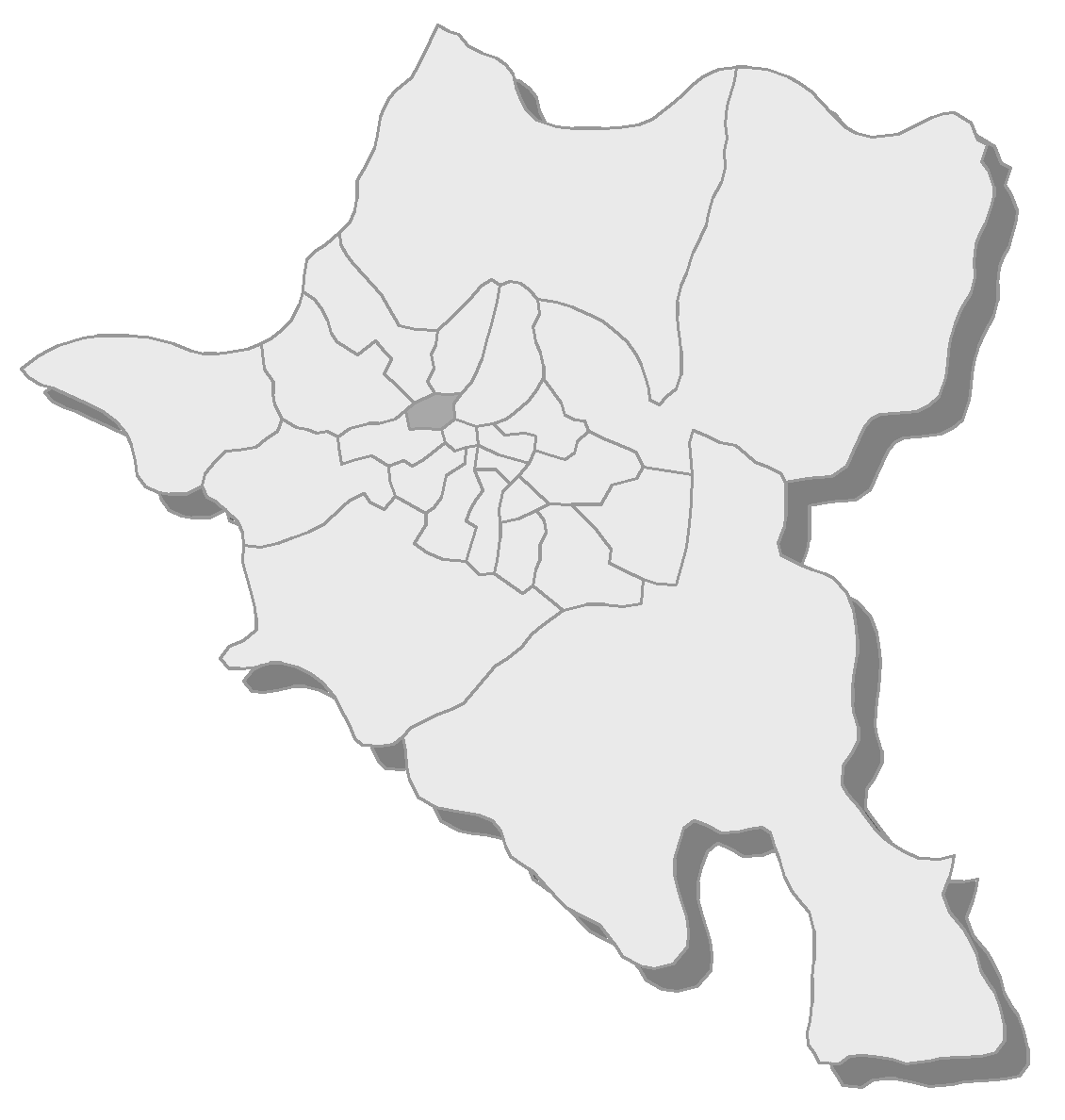
- Position of Ilinden in Sofia
- Interactive map of Ilinden
- Coordinates: 42°42′46″N 23°17′24″E
- Country: Bulgaria
- City: Sofia

Government
  - Mayor: Ivan Bozhilov

Area
  - Total: 3.31 km^{2} (1.28 sq mi)

Population (17.08.2017)
  - Total: ▲36,864
- Time zone: UTC+2 (EET)
  - Summer (DST): UTC+3 (EEST)
- Website: Official Site of Ilinden District

Ilinden (Bulgarian: Илинден [iˈlindɛn]) is a district of Sofia, located in the western parts of the city. As of 2006 it has 37,256 inhabitants. There are four neighbourhoods: "Zaharna Fabrika", "Gevgeliiski", "Sveta Troitsa" (Holy Trinity) and "Ilinden".
