= Lyulin, Sofia =

District of Sofia, Bulgaria

Lyulin Люлин

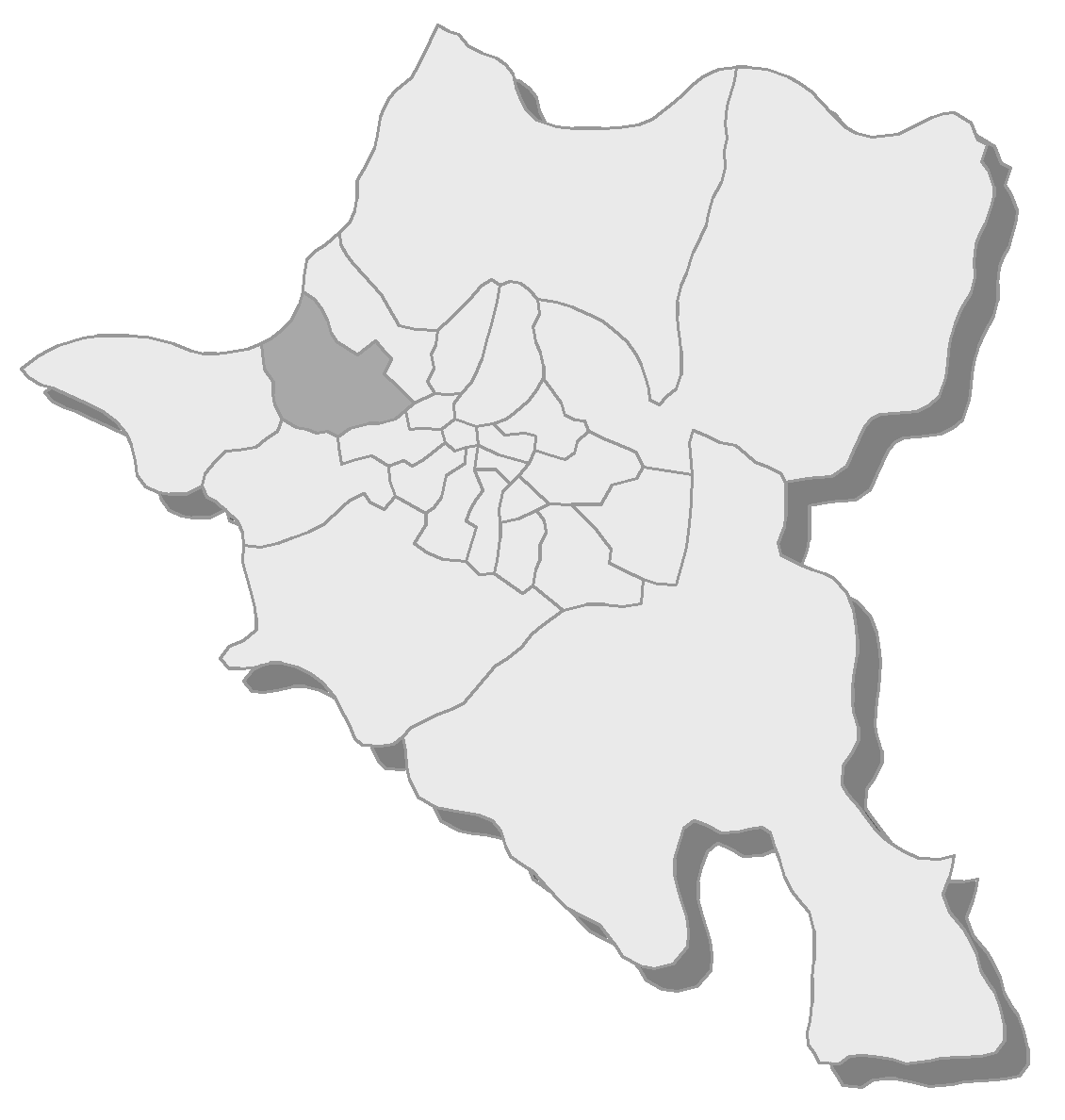
- Location of Lyulin in Sofia
- Coordinates: 42°43′14″N 23°15′19″E
- Country: Bulgaria
- City: Sofia

Government
  - Mayor: Georgi Todorov Spasi Sofia

Area
  - Total: 22.22 km^{2} (8.58 sq mi)

Population (2021)
  - Total: 120 530
- Time zone: UTC+2 (EET)
  - Summer (DST): UTC+3 (EEST)
- Website: Official site of Lyulin District

Lyulin (Bulgarian: Люлин, pronounced [ˈlʲulin]) is a municipality located in the western outskirts of Sofia and is divided into 11 microdistricts. The infrastructural work on the complex began in 1971 and the first condominium was constructed in 1973. The complex is named after the nearby Lyulin Mountain. It is a popular place to live, as it has access to public transportation and real estate is inexpensive; however, there is the drawback of organized crime to which the authorities have largely shown neglect over the years.

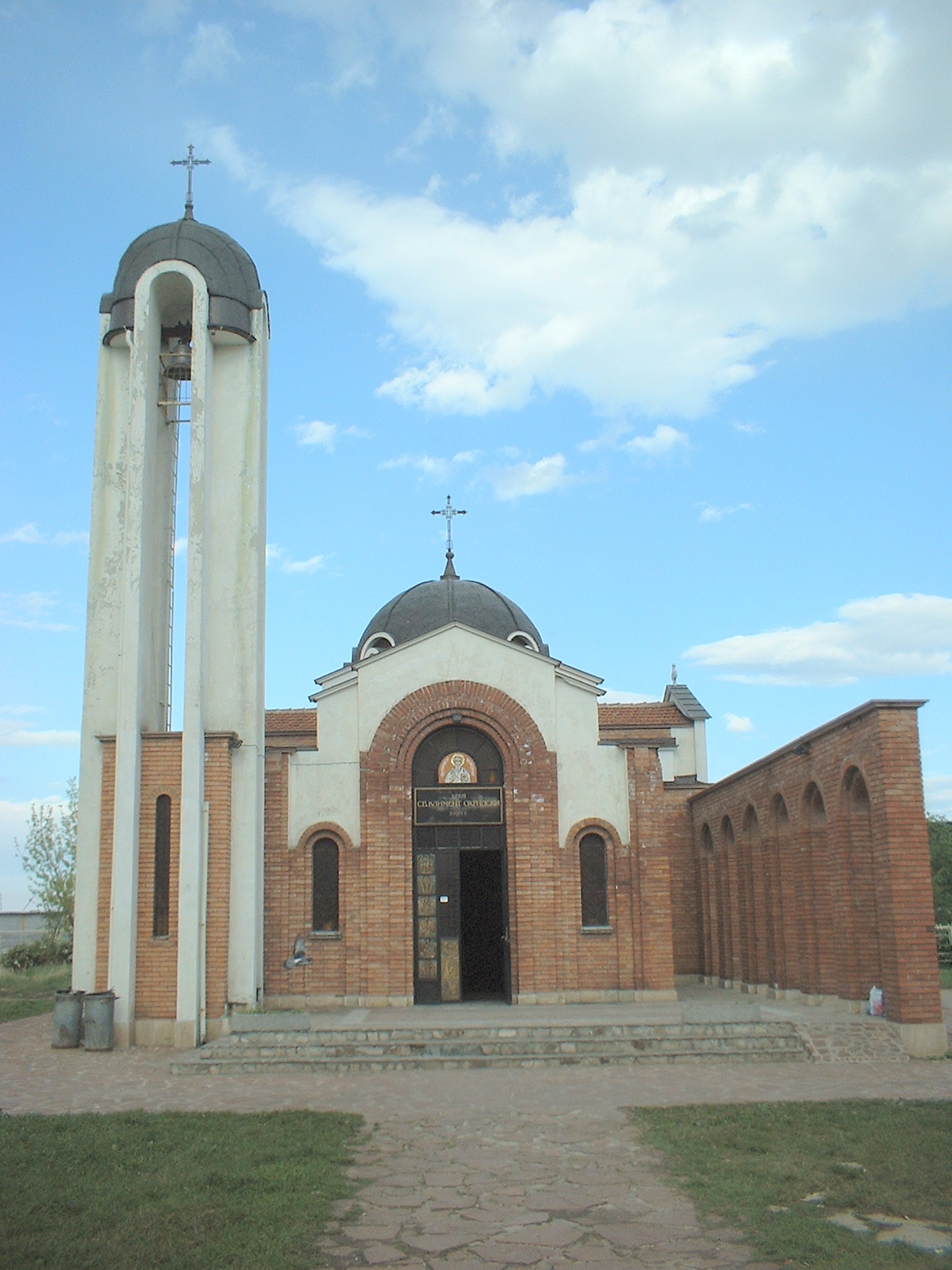
St. Clement of Ohrid Church (1999)

Silver Centre Trade Complex

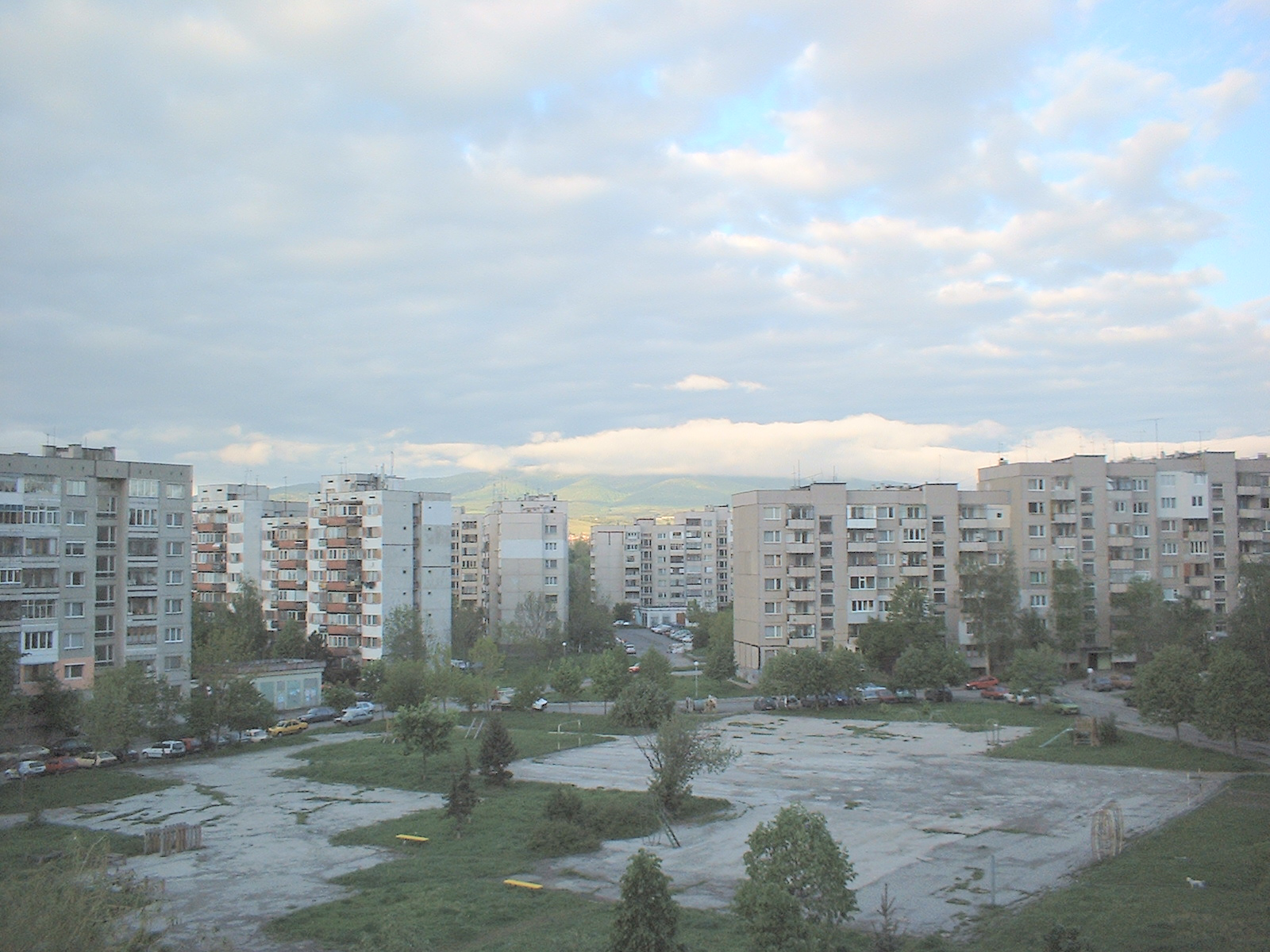
A view of 6th microregion of Lyulin District
