= Oborishte, Sofia =

District in Sofia, Bulgaria

Coordinates: 42°41′47″N 23°20′27″E

Oborishte Оборище
- District of Sofia
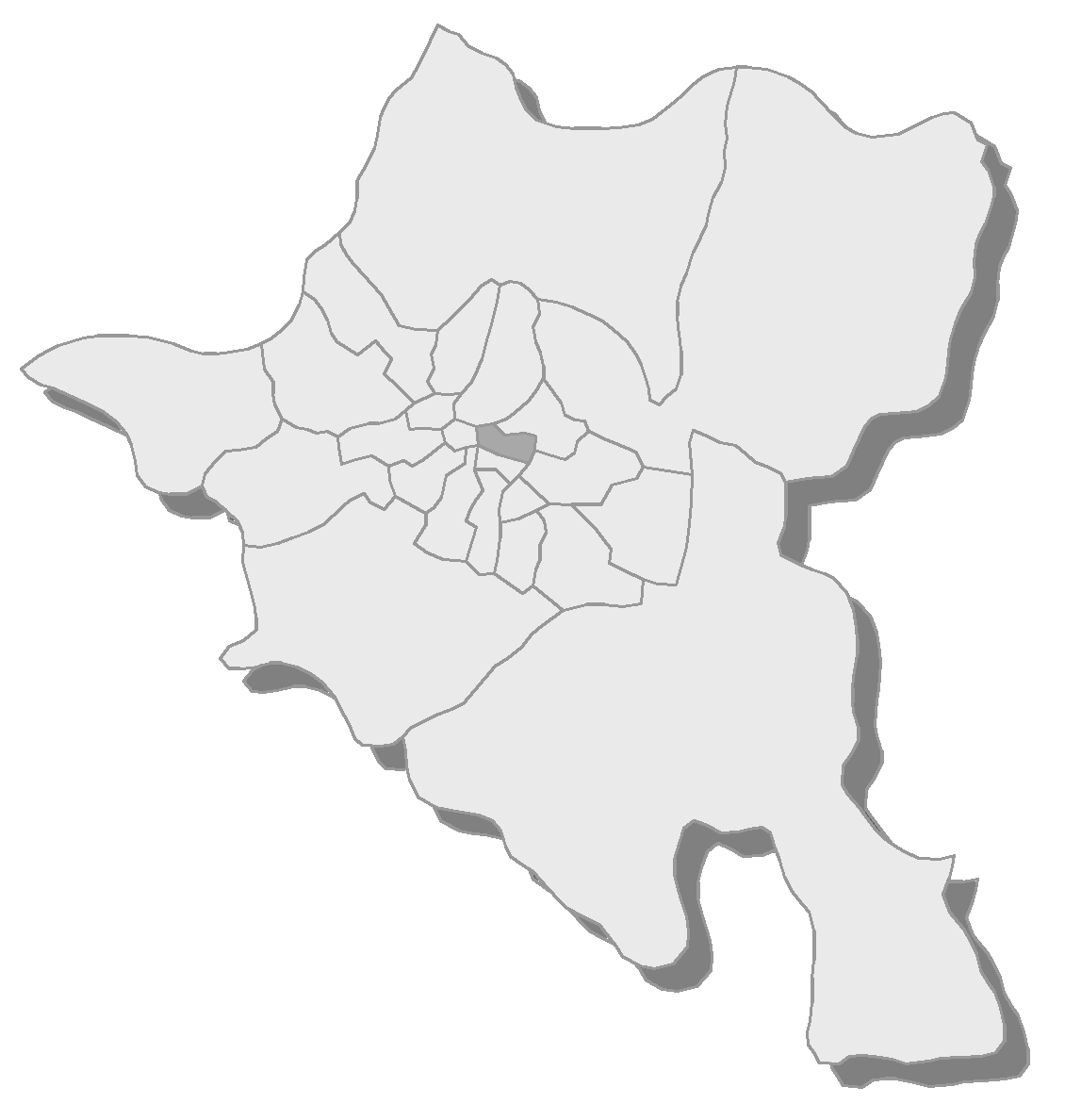
- Location of Oborishte in Sofia Municipality
- Country: Bulgaria
- Province: Sofia City
- Municipality: Stolichna

Oborishte (Bulgarian: Оборище [oˈbɔriʃtɛ]) is an urban district located in the centre of the Bulgarian capital Sofia. As of 2006 the population is 36,000. It has an area of 3.07 km^{2}, of which streets and squares encompass 59 ha, parks and gardens 47 ha, schools and kindergartens 9 ha, hospitals and polyclinics 5 ha, embassies 1.5 ha, theatres 1 ha, petrol stations and parkings 2.5 ha, churches 1 ha, administrative buildings 16 ha and residential areas 164 ha.

A large part of the population is engaged in government and administration. There are several ministries and other important institutions including the Council of Ministers, the Ministry of Regional and Public Development, the Ministry of Education, the Social Ministry, the Energetics Committee, the Capital Municipality, the Parliament building, the State Archive Bureau and many embassies and others.

Three institutions for higher education are located in the district: the National Academy of Art, the State Academy of Music and the Military Academy Georgi Sava Rakovski. There are 12 schools, 6 kindergartens and 3 chitalishta.

== Culture ==
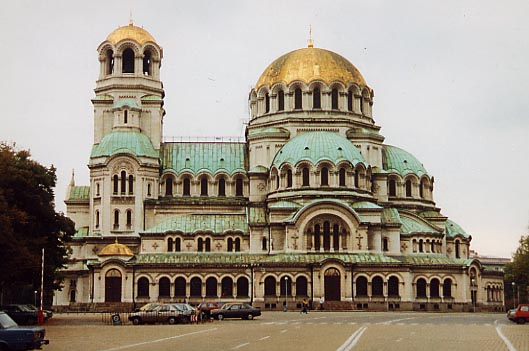
St Alexander Nevsky is one of the largest Eastern Orthodox cathedrals in the world

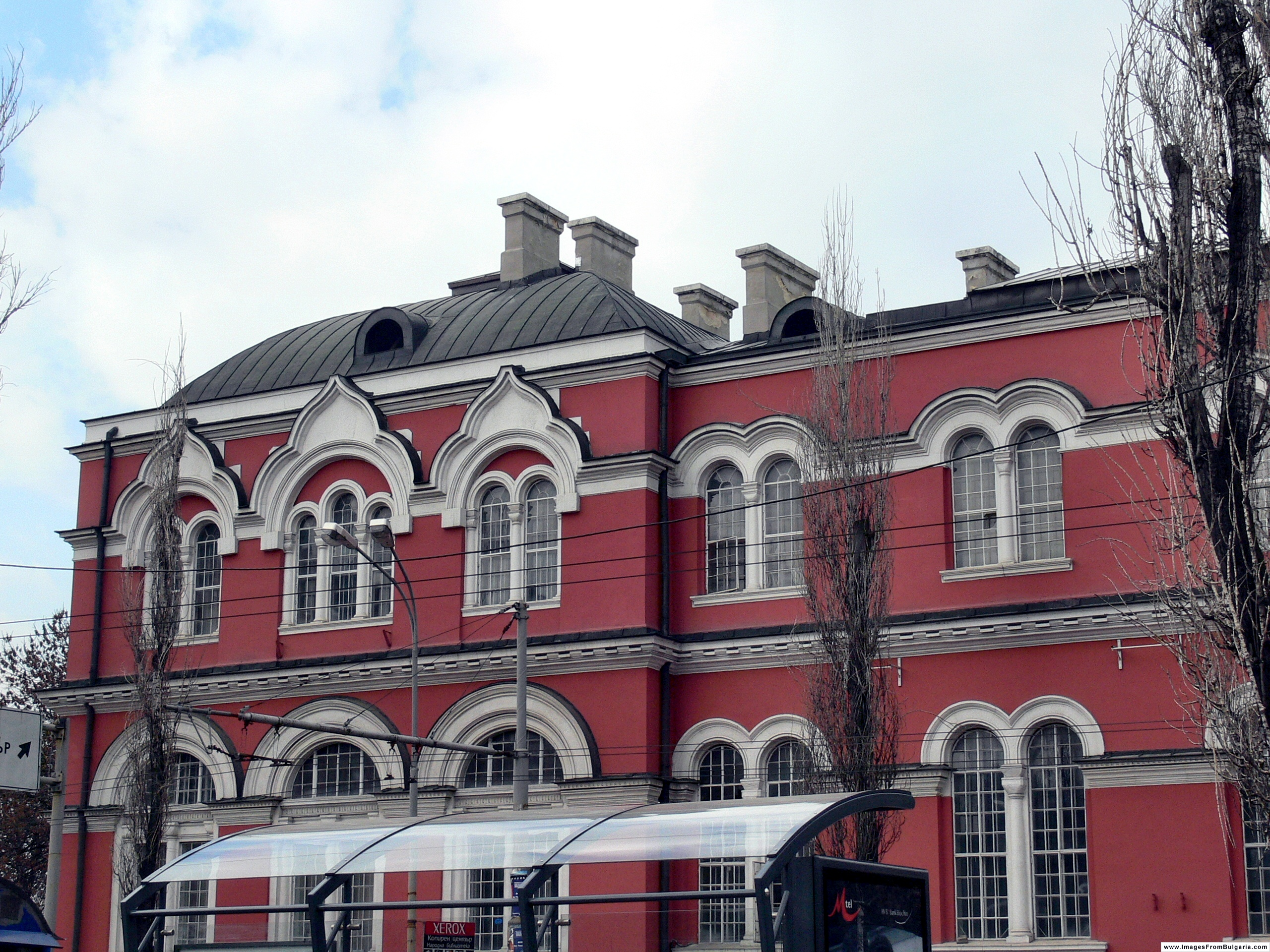
The rector's house of the National Academy of Art

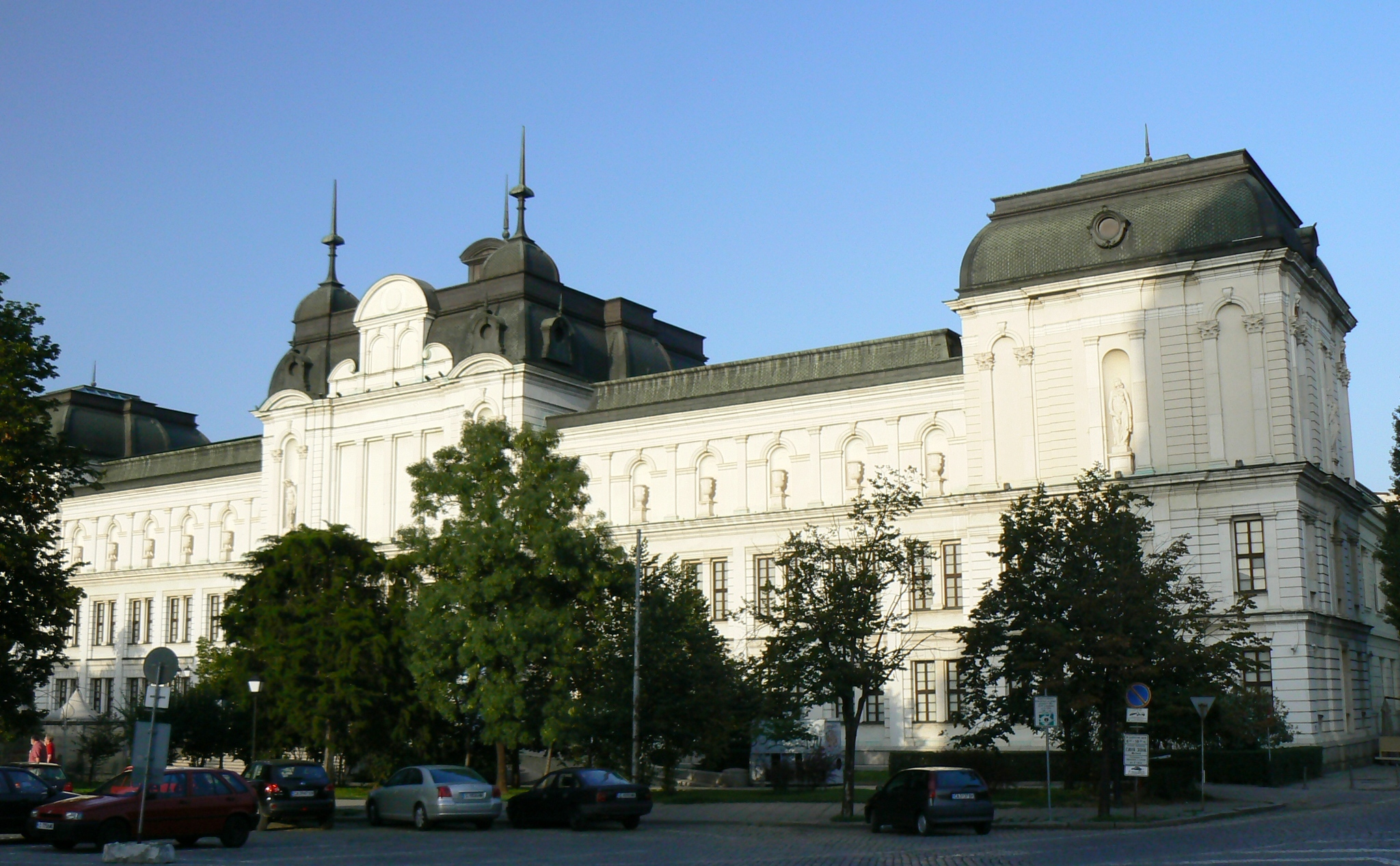
The National Gallery for Foreign Arts (former Royal Printing Office)

The municipal area occupies the eastern part of the City centre including some parts of ancient Serdica. Many cultural institutions and monuments of national importance are located in Oborishte including 15 monuments (Monument to Vasil Levski, Monument to the Unknown Soldier, Monuments to SS Cyril and Methodius, Doctors, Aleksandar Stamboliyski, Ivan Vazov and others), 40 memorial plates, 211 Monuments of Culture (including the Strawberry House) and 9 churches.

Cultural Institutions:

- State Musical Theatre "St. Makedonski"
- Dramatic Theatre "Sofia"
- Lesser City Theatre
- State Puppet Theatre-Salon 2
- Theatre Workshop "Sfumato"
- "Levski" Cinema
- "Serdica" Cinema
- "Moderen Teatar" Cinema
- House of Cinema
- SS. Cyril and Methodius National Library
- National Gallery for Foreign Art
- National Museum of Military History

Churches include:

- Alexander Nevsky Cathedral
- Hagia Sophia Church
- Church of St Petka
- Church of St Paraskeva (Sofia)

The Holy Synod and the Apostolic Nunciature are also located here.
