= Iskar, Sofia =

District of Sofia, Bulgaria

Iskar Искър
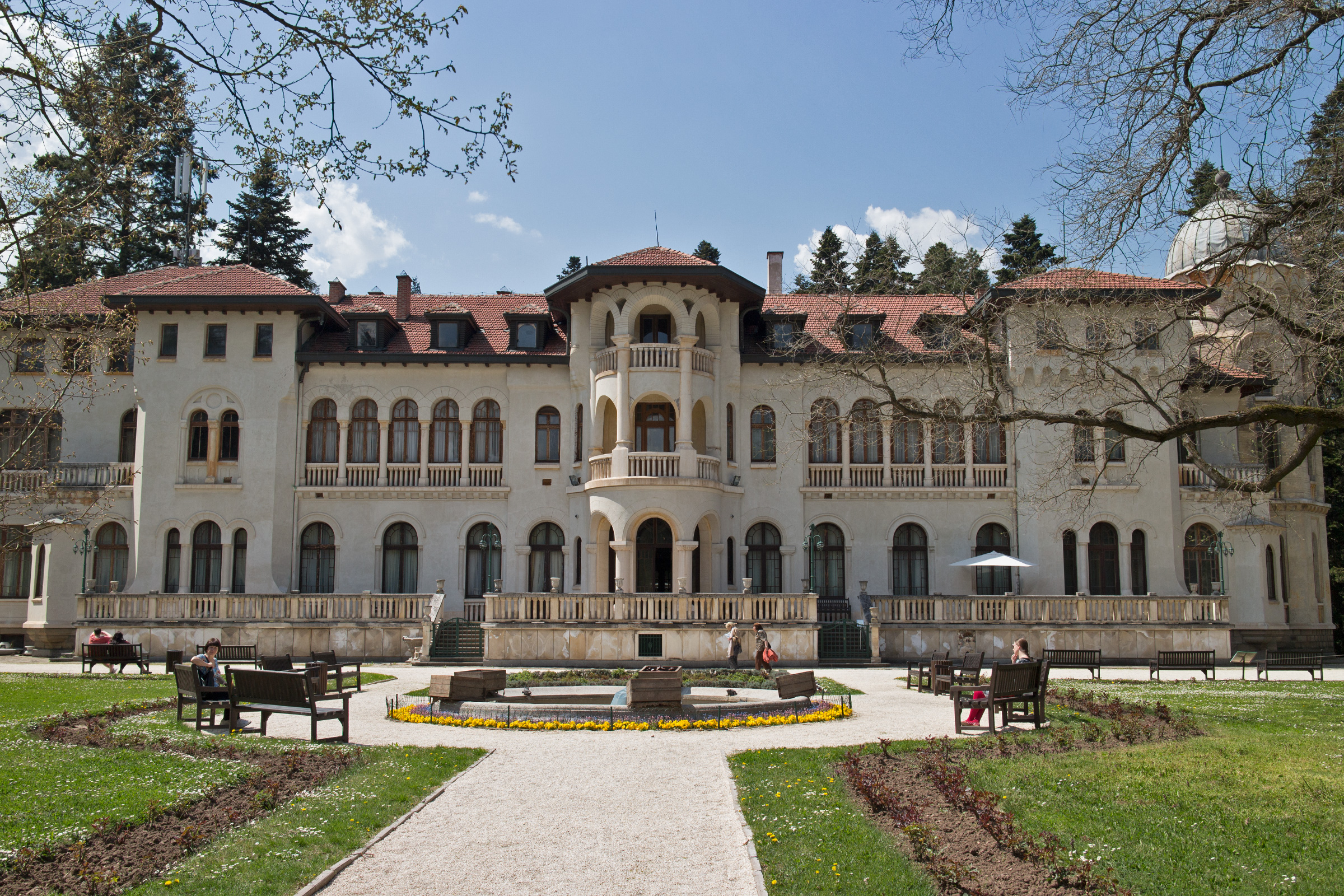
- Vrana Palace

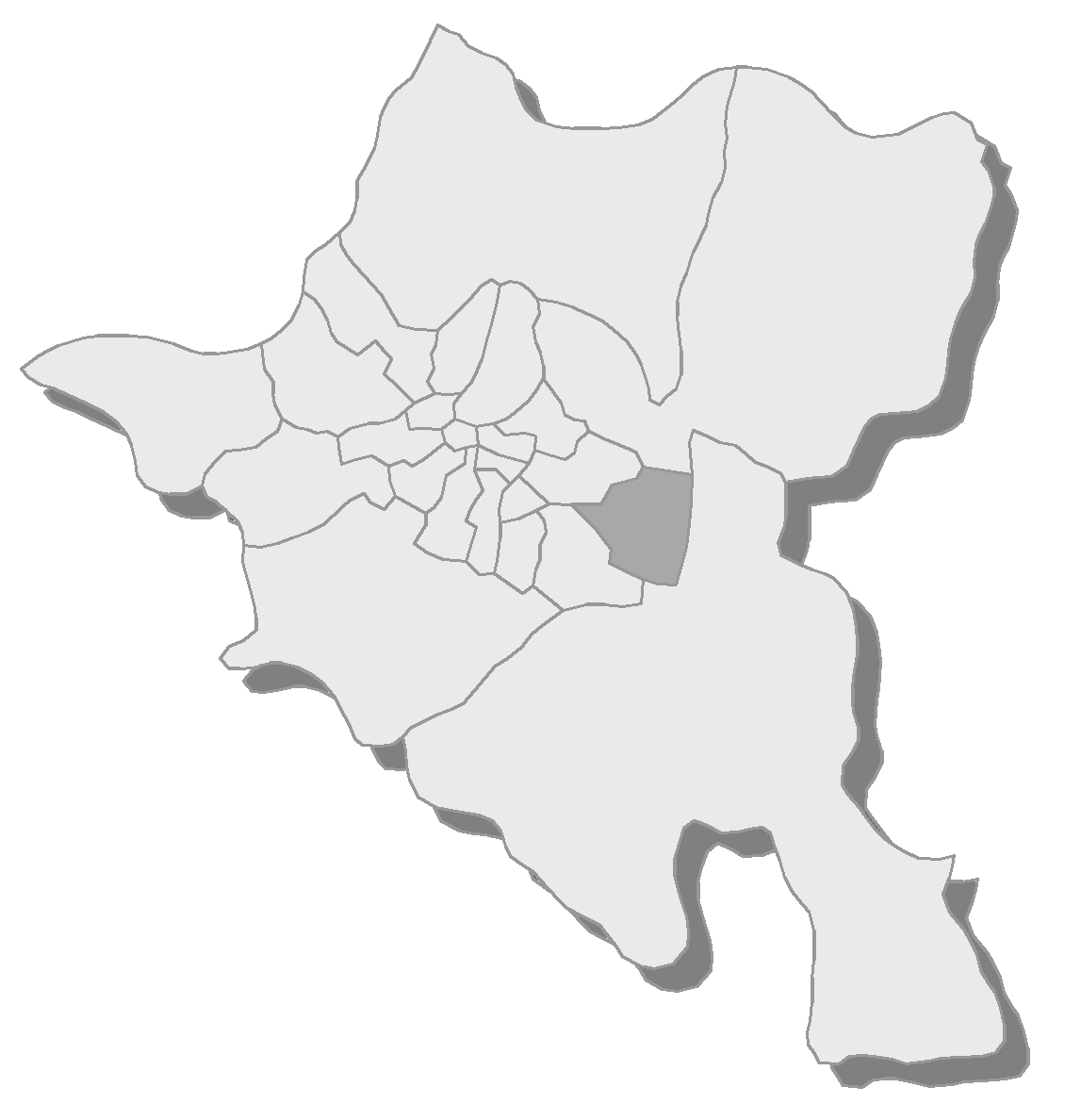
- Position of Iskar in Sofia
- Interactive map of Iskar
- Coordinates: 42°39′46″N 23°25′7″E
- Country: Bulgaria
- City: Sofia

Government
  - Mayor: Ivaylo Tsekov GERB

Area
  - Total: 25.6 km^{2} (9.9 sq mi)

Population (2021)
  - Total: 69,599
- Time zone: UTC+2 (EET)
  - Summer (DST): UTC+3 (EEST)
- Website: Official Site of Iskar District

Iskar (Bulgarian: Искър [ˈiskɐr]) is a district located in the eastern parts of Sofia. As of 2006 it has 69,896 inhabitants and has an area of 25,6 km^{2}. It includes four neighbourhoods: "Druzhba 1", "Druzhba 2", "Dimitar Milenkov" and Abdovitsa as well as the village of Busmantsi. The district also includes the "Gara Iskar" industrial zone which is situated around the railway station of the same name.

Vrana Palace is situated in Iskar District. There is a spacious park with rare tree species and a lake. There are 3 churches including one in Busmantsi.
