= Slatina, Sofia =

District of Sofia, Bulgaria

Slatina Слатина
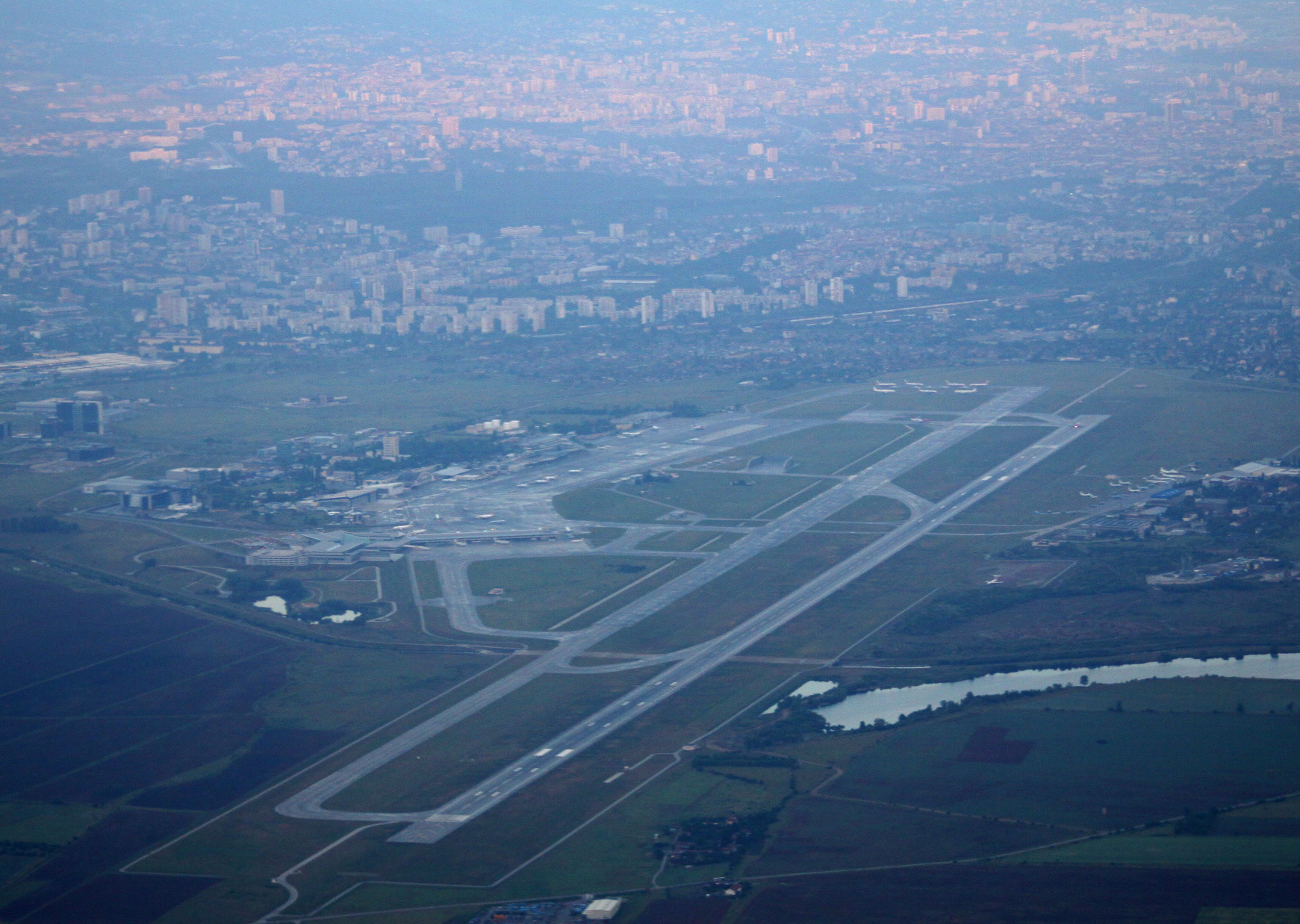
- Aerial view of Sofia airport and the city behind it

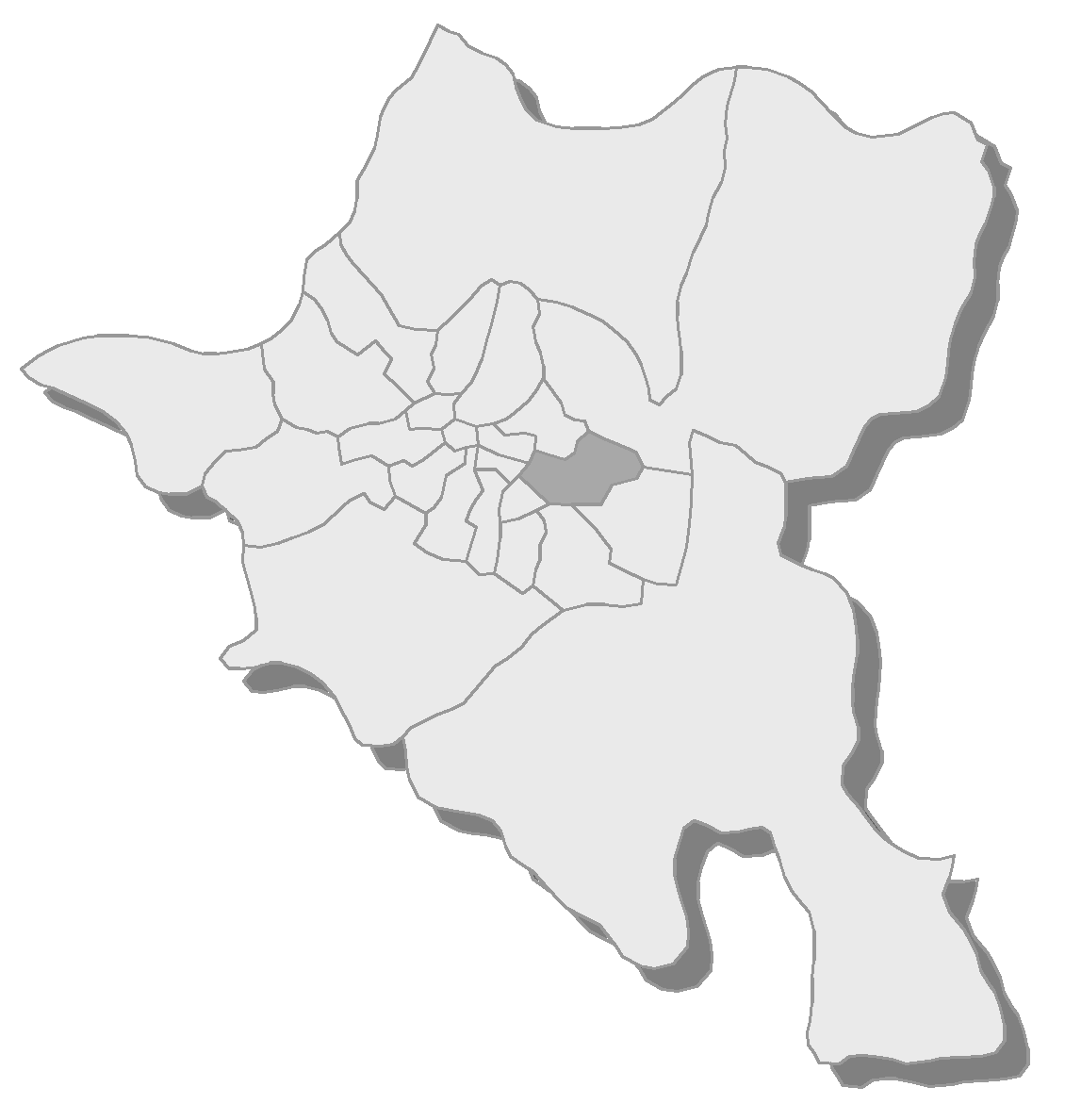
- Location of Slatina in Sofia
- Interactive map of Slatina
- Coordinates: 42°40′40″N 23°22′05″E
- Country: Bulgaria
- City: Sofia

Government
  - Mayor: Georgi Iliev Yes, Bulgaria!

Area
  - Total: 13.25 km^{2} (5.12 sq mi)

Population (2021)
  - Total: 66 687
- Time zone: UTC+2 (EET)
  - Summer (DST): UTC+3 (EEST)
- Website: Official site of Slatina District

Slatina (Bulgarian: Слатина [ˈsɫatinɐ]) is a district located in the eastern parts of the capital Sofia. As of 2021 it has 66,687 inhabitants. The district has an area of 13.25 km² which counts for 6.69% of the total Capital Municipality area. It is a flat country with some heights to the west.

Slatina, then a village, was first mentioned in 1420 as İslatina. Its name is derived from the common Bulgarian noun slatina, "saline spring", itself from the adjective slat ("salty, saline"). The word is attested in Old Bulgarian as СЛАТИНА, "bog, swamp, marsh", "non-squirting spring". The name is popular in Bulgarian and Slavic toponymy.

Its borders follow Iskarsko Shose Str., Iskar River, Tsarigradsko Shose Blvd, Sitnyakovo Blvd, Boyan Magesnik Str, Stoyan Popov Str and Letostrui Str. Slatina includes five neighbourhoods: "Yavorov"; "Geo Milev"; "Hristo Smirnenski"; "Reduta" and "Hristo Botev". "Reduta" neighbourhood is the highest place in the capital.

There are 23 hectares of green spaces and 3 parks. There are several important institutions, such as the Ministry of Domestic Affairs, Committee for Exploiting Nuclear Energy for Peaceful Purposes, and State Music Academy "Pancho Vladigerov". The embassies of Sweden, China, India and Romania are located there. There are also two sports halls: "Festivalna" and "Universiada".

== Transport ==
Slatina is serviced by busses, trams and trolleybuses, which run along Tsarigradsko shose.

The district's trams run on standard gauge rails, meaning that they are incompatible with the wider light rail network of sofia.

Slatina is currently lacking a subway connection, however there are plans to construct several new metro stations in the later parts of the 2020s.

== Economy ==
Service and manufacturing industry are the backbone of the economy. There are large machine-building and electronics plants such as "Electronika", "Lidi-R", "Meditsinska Tehnika Inzhenering". There are also food processing plants. One of the symbols of the capital, Pliska Hotel is located within the district. Sky City Mall is located in close proximity to the Pliska Hotel. The unemployment rate is 4,1%.

Sofia International Airport is a major transport hub not only of Sofia and Bulgaria but in the whole Balkan Peninsula. There is a business park under construction near the airport.

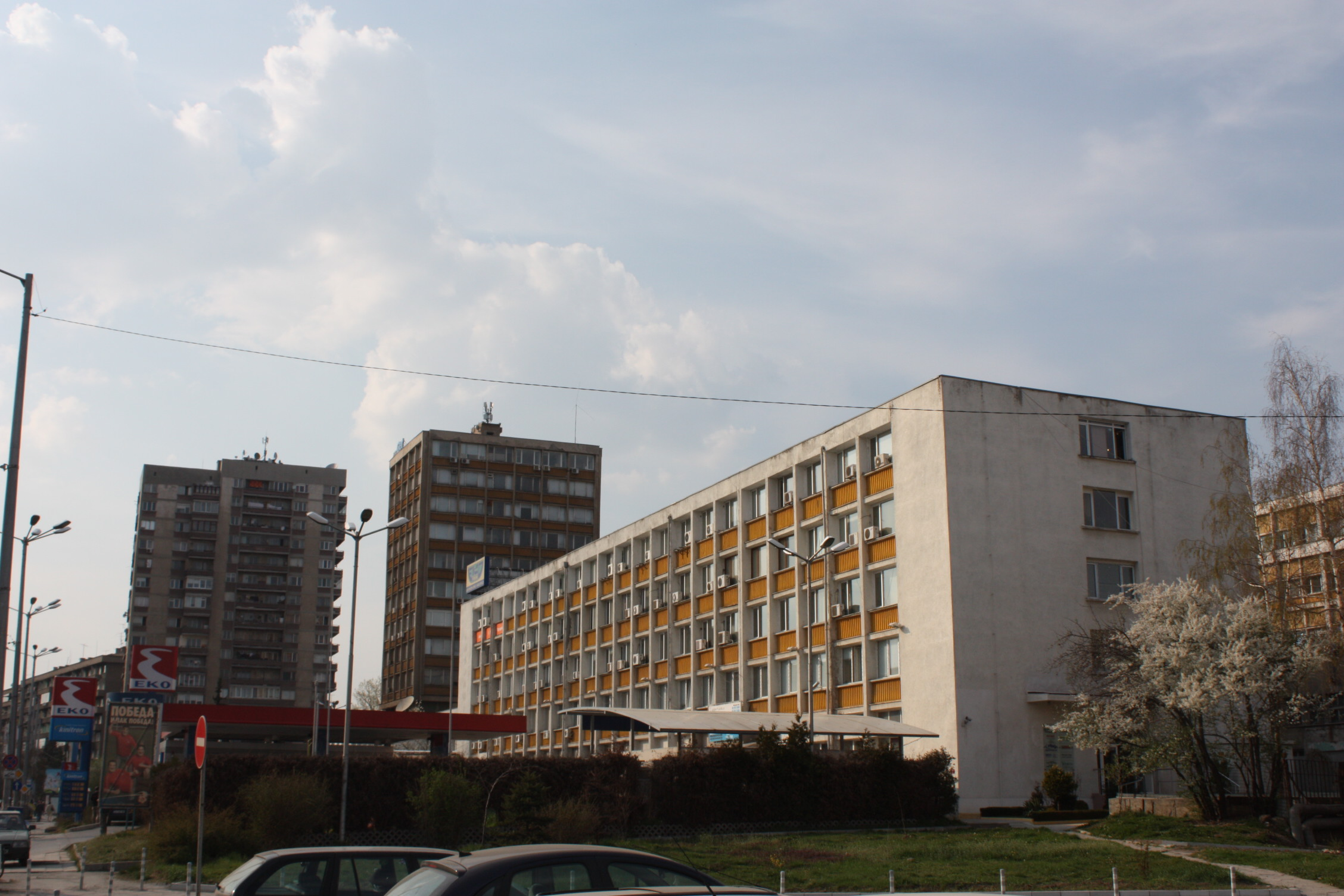
The building of the metropolitan municipality of Slatina

== Culture and education ==
There are 9 schools, 8 kindergartens and 6 chitalishta in Slatina. There are also three Institutes for Higher Education. The State School for Dance Art is located there as well. There are two churches: "Sv. Troitsa" (Holy Trinity) and "Sveti Duh" (Holy Spirit). There is a chapel "Sv. Mina".

== Honour ==
Slatina Peak on Smith Island, South Shetland Islands is named after Slatina, Sofia and few homonymous Bulgarian settlements.
