= Serdika =

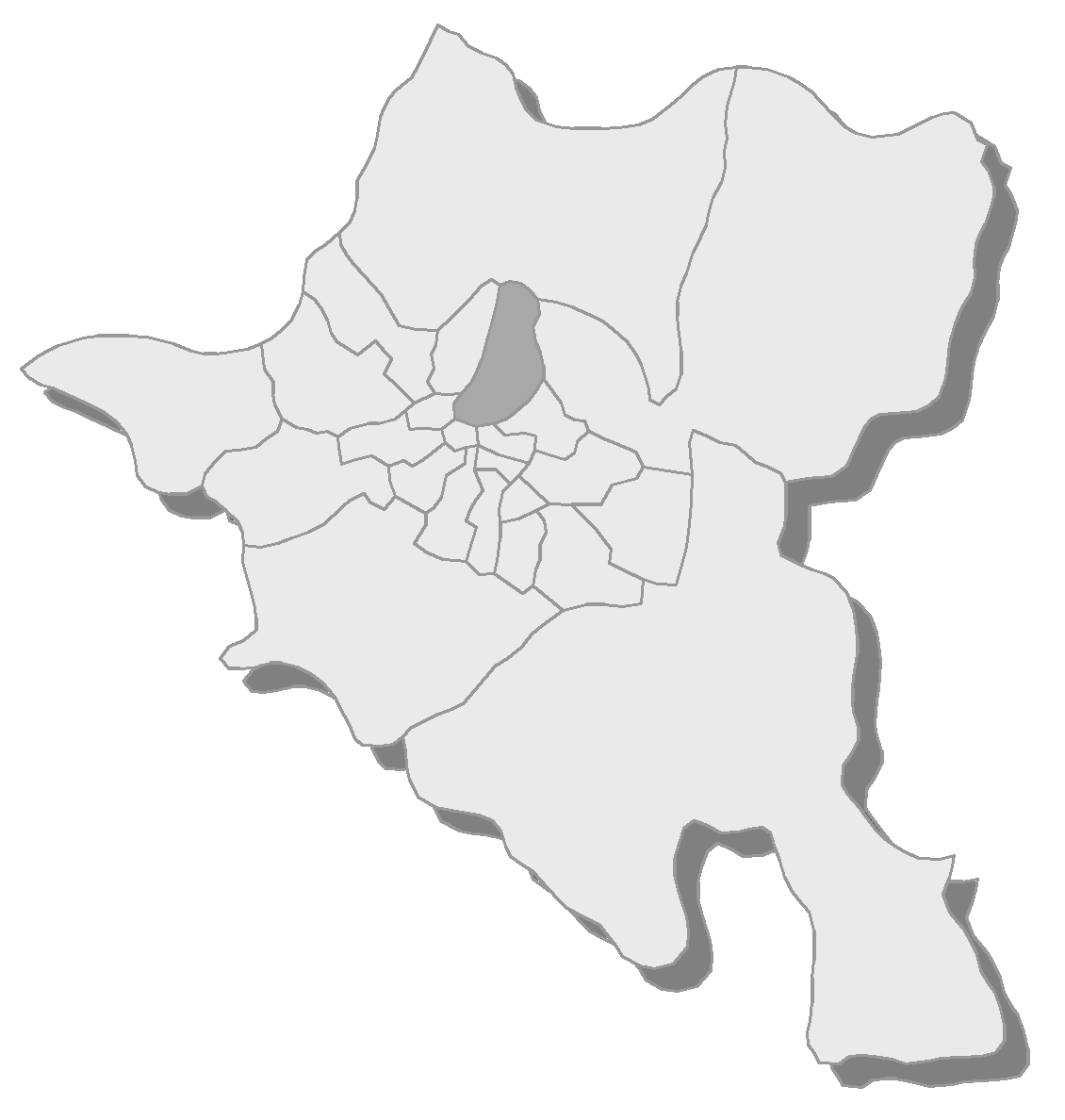
- Location of Serdika within Sofia
- Coordinates: 42°43′18″N 23°19′43″E
- Country: Bulgaria
- Province: Sofia City
- Municipality: Stolichna

Serdika or Serdica (Bulgarian: Сердика [ˈsɛrdikɐ]) is an administrative subdivision of Sofia, Bulgaria, named after the ancient city of Serdica.

The Serdika district includes four neighbourhoods: "Fondovi zhilishta"; "Banishora", "Orlandovtsi" and "Malashevtsi" as well as the central parts of "Draz mahala". It has an area of 17.53 km^{2} that counts for 1.3% of the total Capital Municipality area and 8.8% of the city proper. As of 2006 Serdica has a population of 52,918.

There are 6 kindergartens, 13 schools and 6 chitalishta in the territory of the district. Healthcare infrastructure includes II and V City Hospitals; Institute of Transport Medicine and two polyclinics. The Sofia Central Railway Station; Central Bus Station Sofia and the Lavov Most are also located in Serdica.

== See also ==
- History of Sofia
