= Suomi-marssi =

- March by Erik Wilhelm Eriksson
- English: Finland March
- Other name: Marsch aus Petersburg; Petersburger Marsch
- Genre: Martial music
- Published: 1837

Suomi-marssi (lit. 'Finland March') is a Finnish military march composed in 1837 by Vääpeli Erik Wilhelm Eriksson of Kaartin Soittokunta. The march is also known as Marsch aus Petersburg or Petersburger Marsch. The Finnish Guard Jaeger Regiment uses it as a parade march.

== History ==
The march was first played in 1837 when the Finnish Guards' Rifle Battalion was practicing with the Russian Imperial Guard in Krasnoye Selo. Nicholas I gifted the march to Frederick William III of Prussia. The march was included in the official list of marches of the Prussian Army with the name "Marsch aus Petersburg". The march is still used by the Bundeswehr and by the Finnish Armed Forces, It has also been used by the special operations brigade of the Chilean army as a parade march in the military parade on September 19 in Chile. The last time it was played was in 2013, but it is still in use in other brigades of the Chilean army. The Chilean army has this march thanks to the Prussian influence brought by Emil Körner after the Pacific War.
