= Annukka Ylivaara =

Finnish military officer

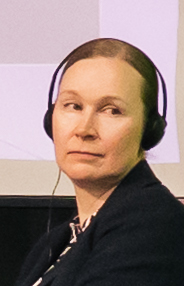
- Born: 1978 (age 47–48); Sodankylä, Finland
- Education: National Defence University
- Military career
- Allegiance: Finland
- Branch: Finnish Army
- Rank: Lieutenant colonel
- Commands: Uusimaa Jaeger Battalion

Annukka Ylivaara is a Finnish lieutenant colonel, and the first woman to serve as a battalion commander in the Finnish Army, following her appointment as commanding officer of the Uusimaa Jaeger Battalion (part of Guard Jaeger Regiment) from May 2022. Her previous posts have included adjutant to the Chief of the Finnish Defence Forces, and roles in e.g. the Lapland Jaeger Battalion.

Ylivaara was born in Sodankylä, Lapland, and comes from a military family. She made her career choice during her voluntary national service. She was first commissioned upon graduation in 2004 from the Finnish National Defence University.
