= Hıfzı =

Hıfzı is a Turkish given name for males. People named Hıfzı include:

- Hıfzı Oğuz Bekata (1911–1995), Turkish lawyer and politician
- Hıfzı Topuz (1923–2023), Turkish journalist, travel writer and novelist
- Ahmet Hıfzı Pasha, Ottoman military personnel
