= Guards Band =

Oldest operational concert band in Finland

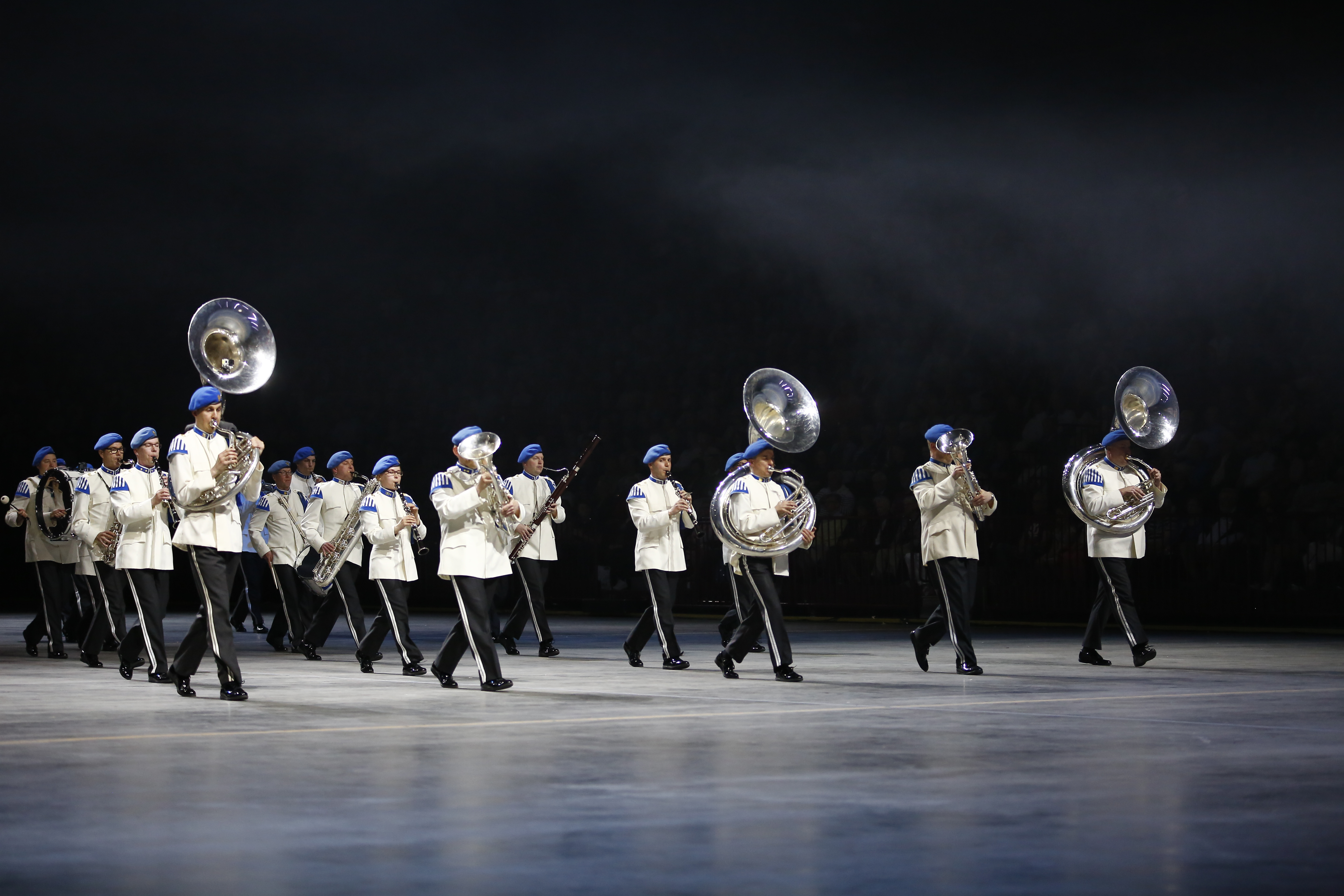
- The Guards Band performing in Malmö, Sweden in 2017
- Active: April 1, 1819 – present
- Allegiance: Finland
- Type: Military band
- Size: 42
- Garrison/HQ: Guard Jaeger Regiment, Helsinki
- Website: sotilasmusiikki.fi/en/guards-band

Commanders
- Senior Conductor: Major (mus.) Timo Kotilainen
- Conductor: Captain (mus.) Aino Koskela

The Guards Band (Finnish: Kaartin soittokunta; Swedish: Gardets musikkår) is the premier band of the Finnish Defence Forces. Established in Parola on April 1, 1819, it is the oldest of the six Finnish military bands as well as the oldest continuously operating professional musical organization in Finland.

The Guards Band is officially the Representative Band of the President of the Republic of Finland. As of 2022, it consists of 42 musicians led by Senior Conductor Timo Kotilainen and Conductor Aino Koskela.

The Guards Band performs in over 100 events every year, including state visits, military parades, state dinners, concerts and the Independence Day Reception at the Presidential Palace. Its most important annual concerts include the Töölö concerts, held at the Temppeliaukio Church to highlight contemporary music, the entertainment concerts at the Finlandia Hall, and a classical concert at the Helsinki Music Centre.

== Different names ==
During its history the orchestra has operated under various names:

- Kaartin soittokunta 1990-
- Helsingin Varuskuntasoittokunta 1952-1990
- Helsingin Varuskunnan soittokunta I 1952
- Helsingin Varuskunnan soittokunta 1941-1952
- Suomen Valkoisen Kaartin rykmentin soittokunta 1919-1940
- Valkoisen Kaartin rykmentin soittokunta 1918-1919
- Suomen Valkoisen Kaartin rykmentin soittokunta 1918
- Pohjois-Pohjanmaan rykmentin soittokunta 1918
- Helsingin Torvisoittokunta 1901-1918
- Henkivartioväen 3. Suomen tarkk'ampujapataljoonan soittokunta 1878-1905
- Henkivartioväen Suomen tarkk'ampujapataljoonan soittokunta 1829-1878
- Suomen Opetustarkk'ampujapataljoonan soittokunta 1827-1829
- Helsingin Opetuspataljoonan soittokunta 1819-1827

== History ==
- 2021 Timo Kotilainen appointed as senior conductor of the band.
- 2021 Aino Koskela appointed as conductor.
- 2016 Pasi-Heikki Mikkola appointed as senior conductor.
- 2014 visits Norwegian Military Tattoo in Oslo.
- 2013 Jyrki Koskinen appointed as senior conductor of the band.
- 2011 visits Berlin Tattoo.
- 2011 Ville Paakkunainen appointed as conductor.
- 2009 The first three-day Kaartin Soittokunta Festival in Suomenlinna.
- 2009 Raine Ampuja appointed as senior conductor of the band.
- 2008 Elias Seppälä appointed as senior conductor of the band.
- 2006 Sami Hannula appointed as conductor.
- 1997 visits Germany and Tallinn. Tattoo'97 figure marching tour.
- 1996 visits Tallinn.
- 1995 Elias Seppälä appointed as conductor. Band visits Czechoslovakia.
- 1993 took part in the first nationwide Tattoo-tour.
- 1990 name changed to Kaartin Soittokunta (Guards Band).
- 1984 Esko Juuri appointed as conductor.
- 1977 Teuvo Laine appointed as conductor.
- 1976 visits Paris.
- 1972 visits Zurich.
- 1967 Arvo Kuikka succeeds Uro in all functions.
- 1966 visits Lausanne.
- 1964 Arvo Uro appointed as Chief Conductor of Finnish Defence Forces as well as leading Helsingin Varuskuntasoittokunta and adjoining Defence Forces Music School.
- 1963 visits Copenhagen.
- 1959 visits to Stockholm and Gothenburg.
- 1952 name changed first to Helsingin Varuskunnan soittokunta I and then to Helsingin Varuskuntasoittokunta.
- 1940 name changed to Helsingin Varuskunnan soittokunta (Helsinki Garrison Band)
- 1934 Arthur Rope appointed as conductor.
- 1932 Chief conductor of the Finnish Defence Forces, Lauri Näre, is also conductor of the band.
- 1926 visits to Riga, Stockholm and Tallinn.
- 1924 Johan Leonard Linnala appointed as conductor.
- 1919 name changed to Suomen Valkoisen Kaartin Soittokunta (Finnish White Guards Band).
- 1918 Helsingin Torvisoittokunta performed in military functions of the Senate during the Finnish Civil War and was taken into active service as Valkoisen Kaartin Rykmentin Soittokunta (band of the White Guard Regiment).
- 1917 Finland gains independence.
- 1905 Henkivartioväen 3. Suomen tarkk'ampujapataljoona was disbanded. Many of the musicians transferred to Helsingin Torvisoittokunta which also received many instruments and sheet music from the band.
- 1904 first recording by a Finnish wind orchestra by the Band of the Finnish Guard. Conductor Albin Lindholm.
- 1901 Aleksei Apostol established Helsingin Torvisoittokunta (Helsinki wind orchestra). Musicians come from the Guard Battalion's band and former Uudenmaan Pataljoona band.
- 1899 Aleksei Apostol, an orphaned boy adopted by the band during the Russo-Turkish war, appointed as the conductor of the band.
- 1891 huge public concerts with 250 musicians to aid famine victims in Russia.
- 1880 Imperial decree on the instrumentation and number of musicians in the band.
- 1878 Suomen kaarti was given the rank of Old Guard and named as Henkivartioväen 3. Suomen tarkk'ampujapataljoona (3rd Imperial Guard Finnish Rifle Battalion).
- 1877-1878 battalion took part in the Russo-Turkish War
- 1874 first Finnish born conductor, Adolf Leander, was appointed Director of Music
- 1861 an imperial decree established the instrumentation of the band as 1 conductor, 34 musicians, 12 students, 1 band trumpet major and 20 company fanfare trumpeters plus the band drum major, a pure ensemble of brass and reed instruments, for a total composition of 70 personnel
- 1849 battalion took part in the quelling of the Hungarian Revolution
- 1831-1832 Suomen kaarti took part in the quelling of the November Uprising in Poland. Before leaving to Poland the band had one conductor, 32 musicians, 9 drummers, 9 trumpeters and one drum major.
- 1829 the battalion (and band) was named Suomen Opetustarkk'ampujapataljoona (Finnish Sharpshooter Drill Battalion) and received the rank of New Guards of the Russian Imperial Guard. It was more commonly known as Suomen kaarti (Finnish Guard) . Starting from this year, the battalion and band were stationed during the summer in Krasnoye Selo, near St. Petersburg, where the Tsar had his summer residence.
- December 24, 1824: the band, now with 21 musicians, nine buglers and two fifers moved with the battalion to Helsinki.
- First the band had only three musicians but in the end of year it had grown to a platoon of twelve.
- Founded in Parola on April 1, 1819, as the band of the Helsingin Opetuspataljoona (Helsinki Drill Battalion), with Josef Thaddeus Tvarjansky as the founding conductor
