= Nikolai Mexmontan =

Finnish general (1860–1932)

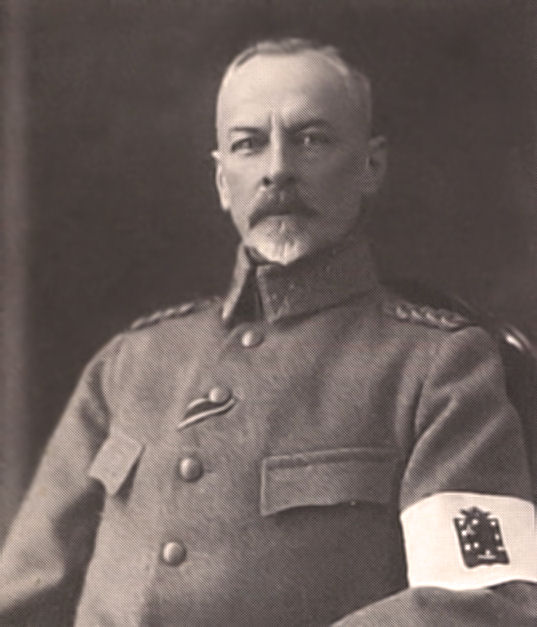
Nikolaj Mexmontan.

Nikolai Fridolfovich Mexmontan (Russian: Николай Фридольфович Мексмонтан; 16 June 1860 Strelna, Russian Empire – 15 November 1932 Helsinki) was a Finnish major general who served as the head of the Supreme Inspection Department during the Finnish Civil War. He was the last commander of the Finnish Guards' Rifle Battalion in 1903–1905.

Nikolai Mexmontan's father was infantry general Fridolf Maexmontan. Mexmontan was an activist and he drew up a plan for the future uprising aimed at the Independence of Finland in Stockholm in 1917. He was in contact with Germany, whose involvement Mexmontan considered necessary, because there were Russian troops in Finland. Mexmontan himself would have liked to have taken over as the commander of the army of the people's uprising, but Hannes Ignatius, who supported Mannerheim, released Mexmontan from the rest of the planning work. He was replaced by Wilhelm Alexsander Thesleff.

The Finnish Civil War broke out in January 1918. When Mexmontan returned from Sweden, he was given the task of acting as the head of the inspection department responsible for the inspection of troops at the White headquarters. He was promoted to major general on 18 February 1918. He served as the chief of the inspection department until the war ended, retiring on 30 May 1918. He was the first officer promoted to general in the Finnish army after independence.

== Personal life ==
Nikolai Mexmontan was married to Johanna Eleonora, daughter of General Georg Edvard Ramsay. Ramsay was also the commander of the Finnish Guard.

== See also ==
- Sotilaskomitea

== Sources ==
- Kronlund, Jarl: Suomen puolustuslaitos 1918–1939. WSOY, 1988. ISBN 951-0-14799-0.
- Suomi sodassa. Oy Valitut Palat. 3. Painos 1984. ISBN 951-9078-94-0.
