= Park Lavrov =

Memorial park in Bulgaria

Coordinates: 43°21′53″N 24°20′28″E

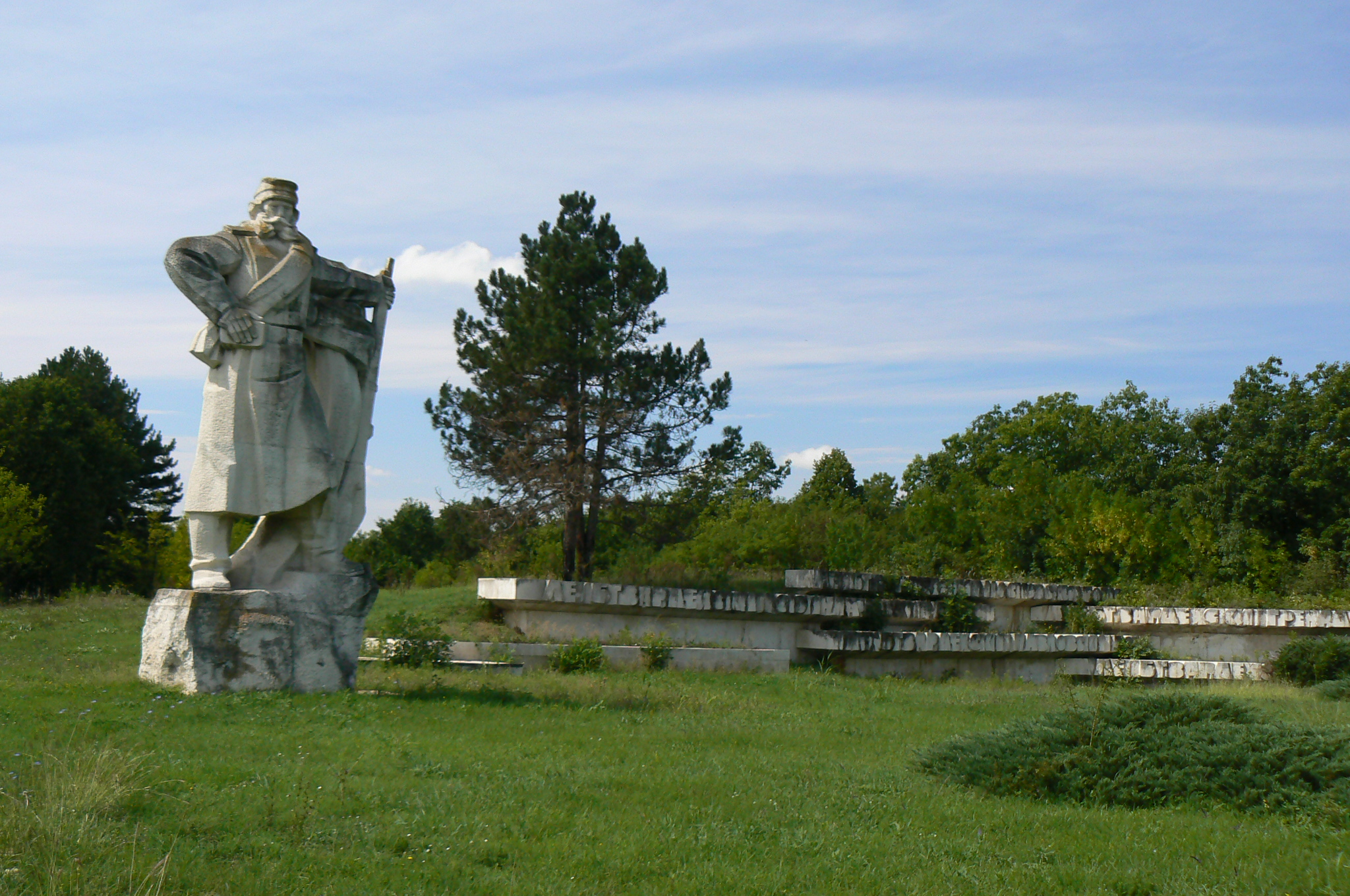
Monument at Park Lavrov's entrance

Park Lavrov (Bulgarian: Парк Лавров) is a memorial park in Pleven Province, Bulgaria, dedicated to the Russian and Finnish soldiers who died in the Siege of Plevna and the Battle of Gorni Dabnik during the Russo-Turkish War of 1877–1878. The park, which lies some 25 kilometres (16 mi) west of Pleven in the vicinity of the village of Gorni Dabnik, was organized in 1950–1954. The park was named in honour of Imperial Russian General Vasily Nikolayevich Lavrov who perished in the Battle of Gorni Dabnik.

Park Lavrov was organized around the mass graves of some 3,500 Russian and Finnish soldiers who died in the Battle of Gorni Dabnik. The park was built under V. Tiholov, who provided the architectural design, and A. Vodopyanov, who arranged the park. The park was entirely reconstructed in 1977, when new monuments were erected. In 2001, the monuments and alleys were renovated as part of the Beautiful Bulgaria programme. An Orthodox chapel dedicated to Saint George was built in 2004.

The park features ossuaries, monuments to the Leib Guard Moscow, Pavlovsky, Izmaylovsky and Grenadier Regiments and the Third Finnish Infantry Battalion, as well as an open-air exhibition of 19th-century Russian cannons.

== Gallery ==
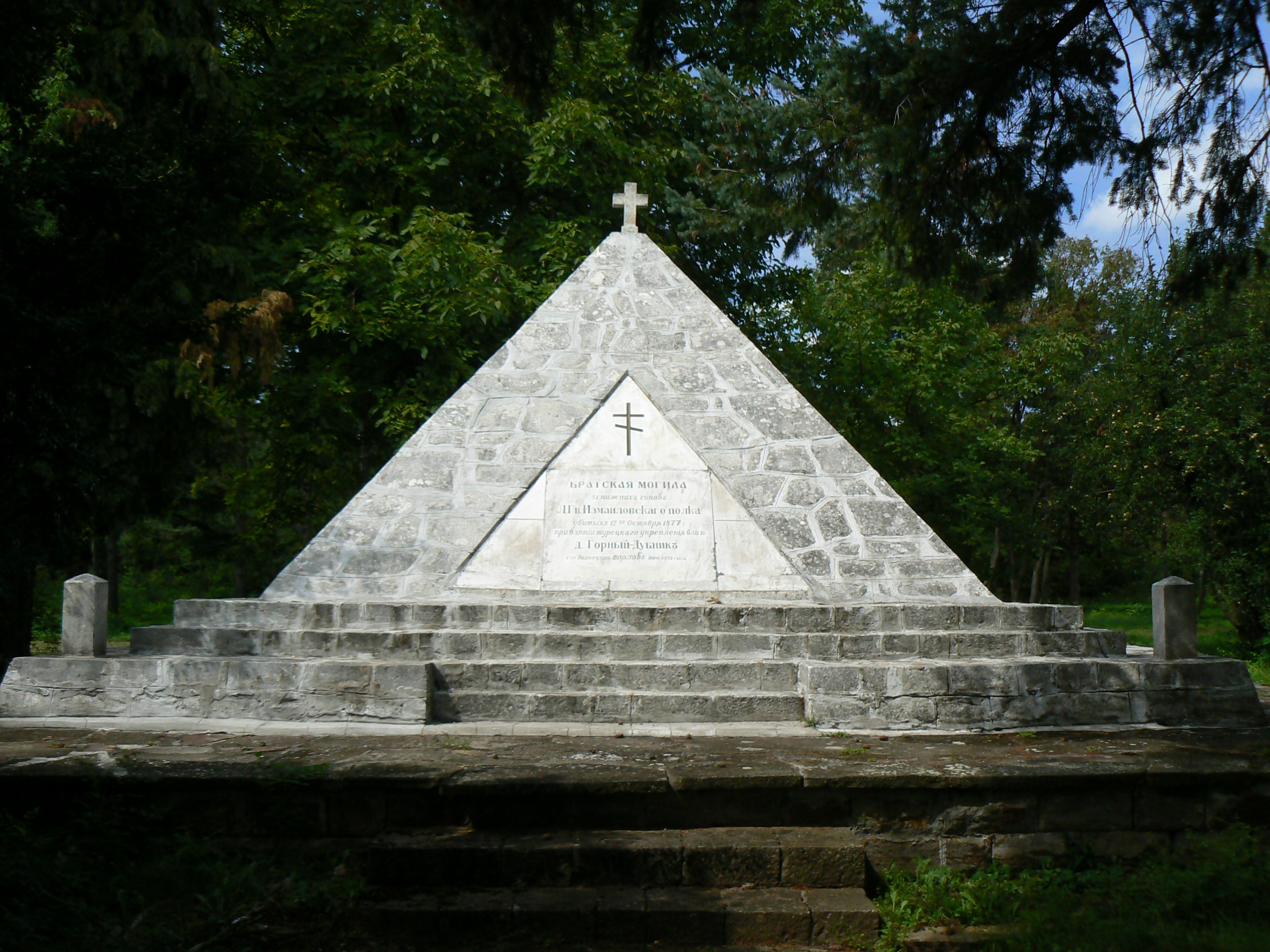
A Brothers' Mound (common grave)

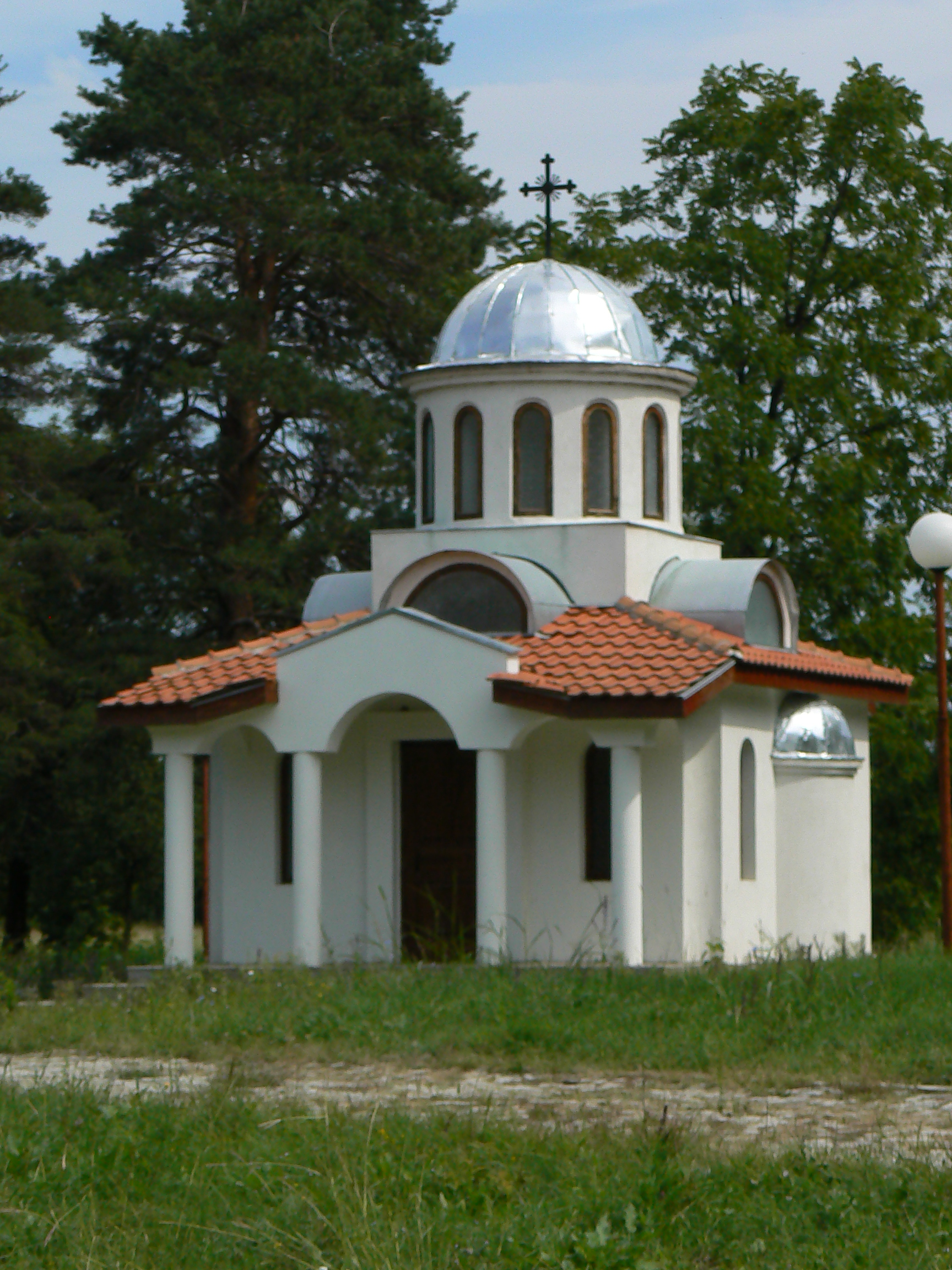
The chapel of Saint George

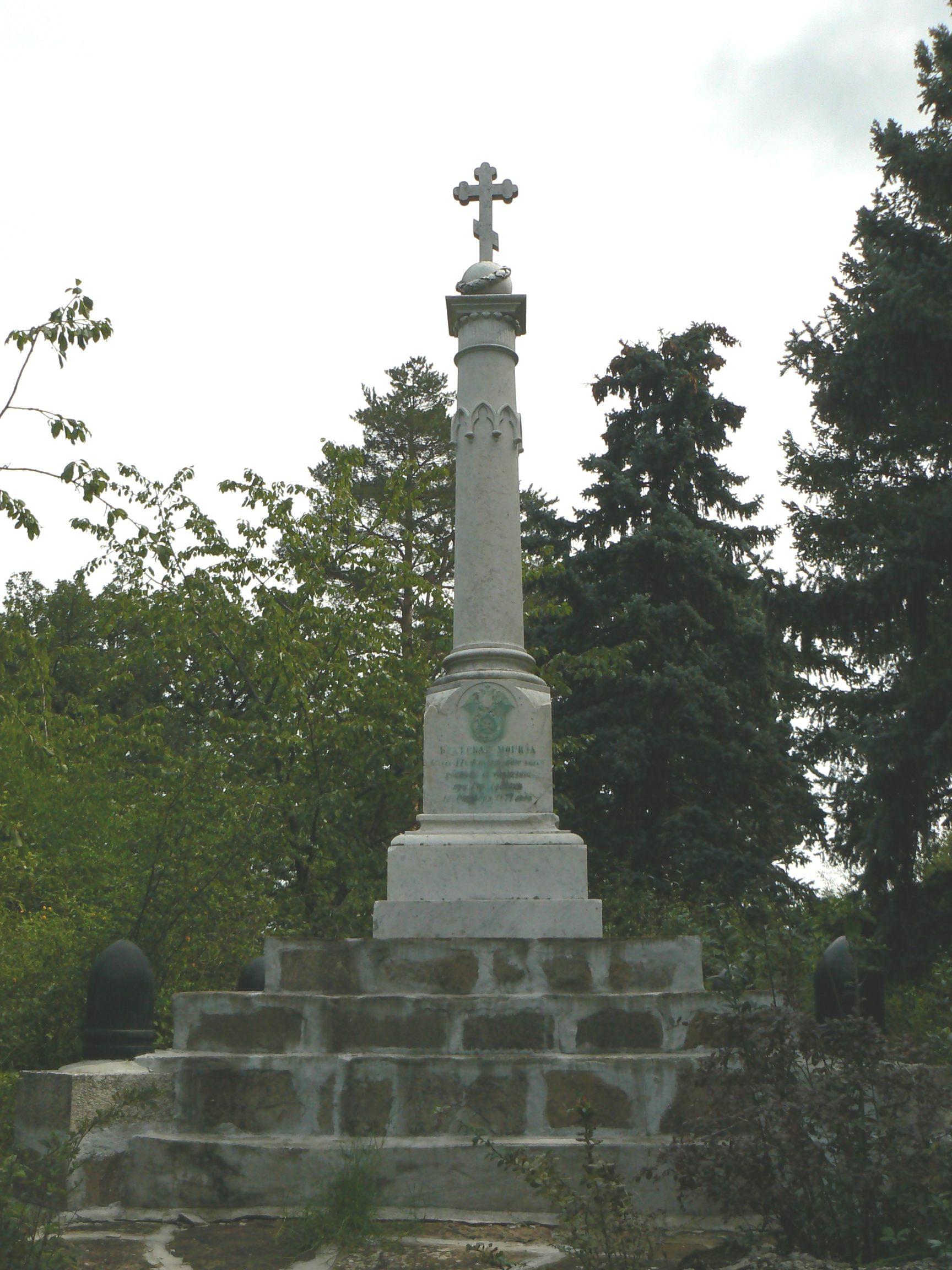
The Finnish monument

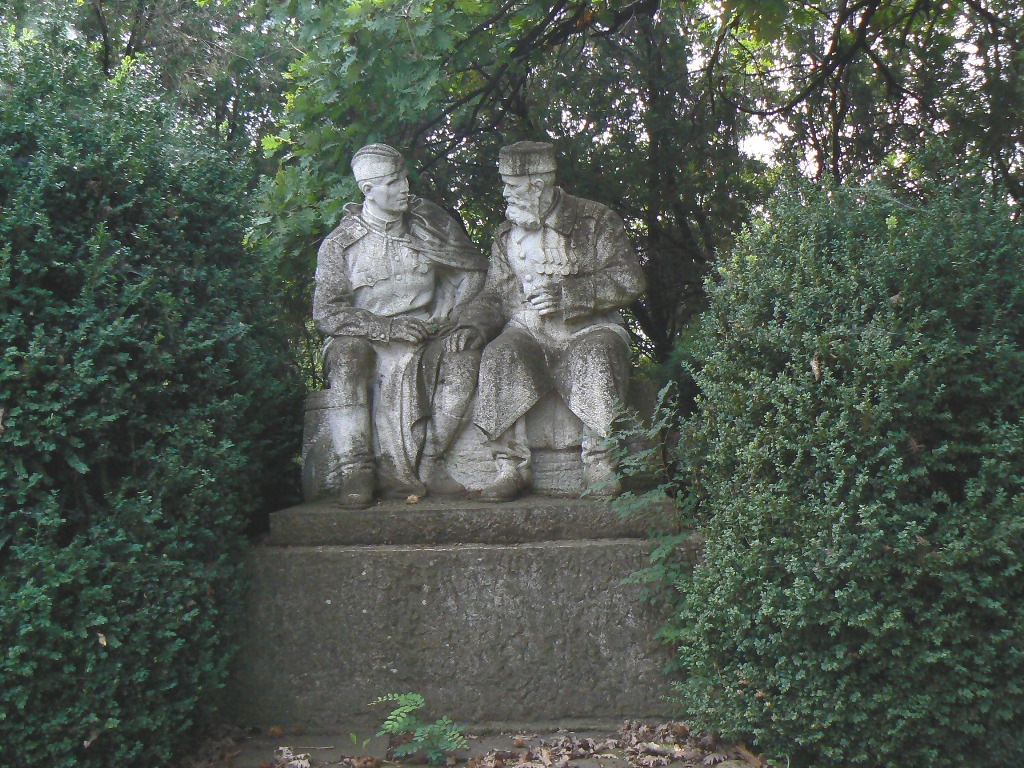
A monument

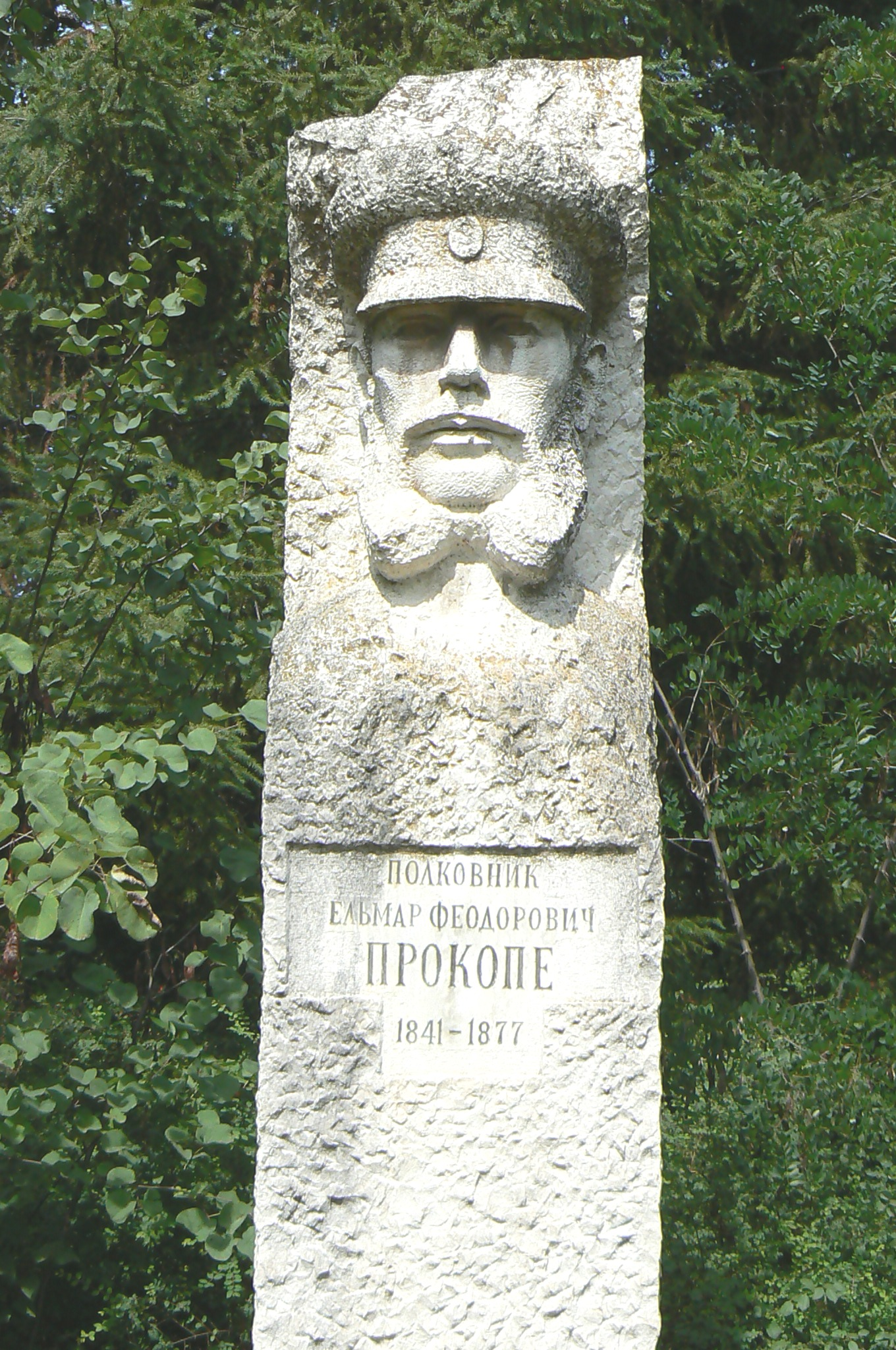
An example of an individual bust, this one dedicated to Colonel Elmar Prokope (1841–1877)
