= Battle of Gorni Dubnik =

1877 battle of the Russo-Turkish War (1877–1878)

Coordinates: 43°22′43″N 24°21′8″E

- Part of the Russo-Turkish War (1877–1878) and Siege of Plevna
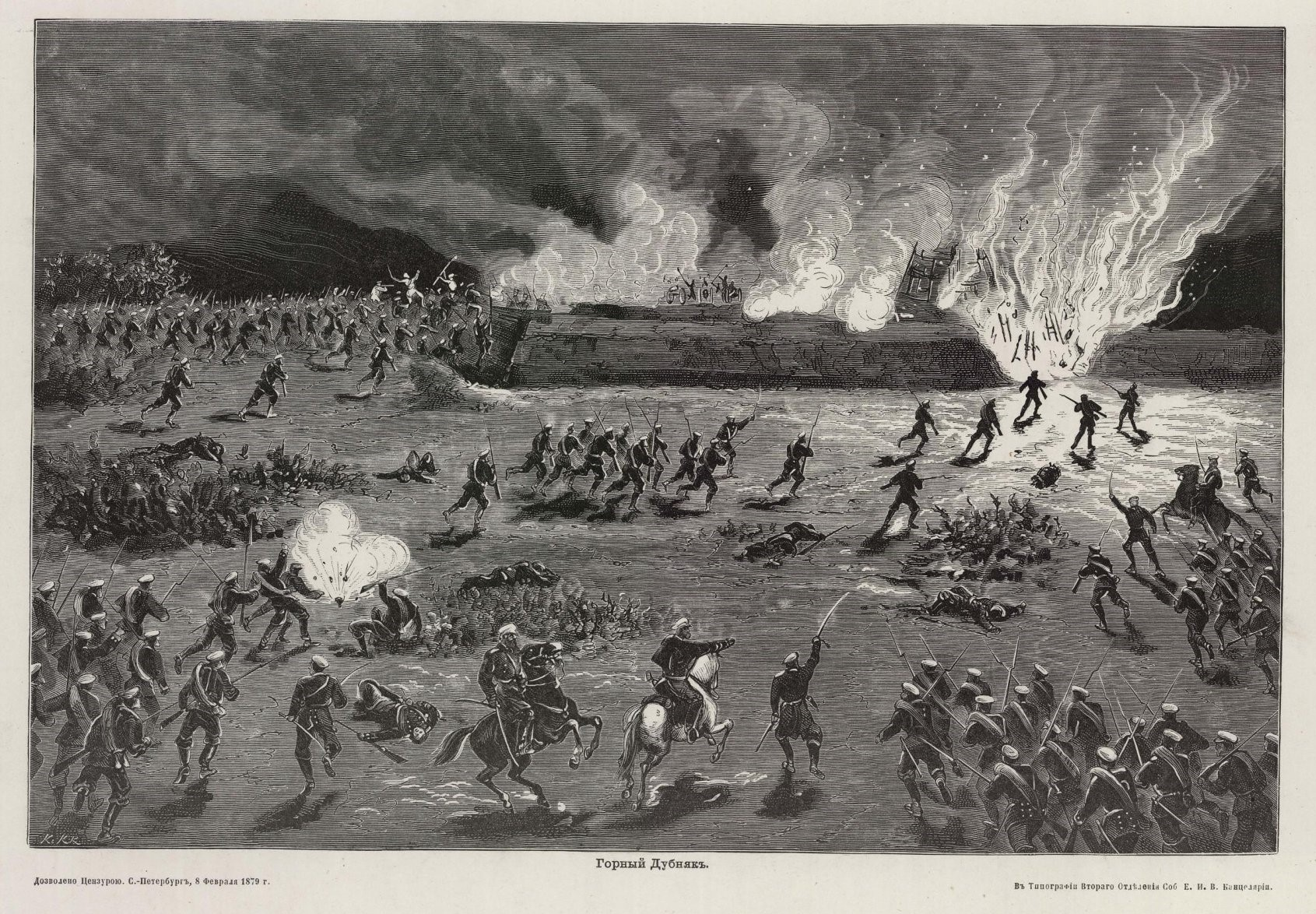
- View of the battle (c. 1870s)
Date	24 October 1877
Location	Kaza of Plevne, Sanjak of Ruschuk, Danube Vilayet, Ottoman Empire (Gorni Dabnik, Pleven Province, Bulgaria)
Result	Russian victory

Belligerents
Russian Empire	Ottoman Empire

Commanders and leaders
Iosif Gurko; Mihail Aleksandroviç Ebeling †; Vasili Lavrov †; Yalmar Prokope (WIA)	Ahmed Hifzi Pasha

Strength
20 battalions 18,000 or up to 22,000 56 guns	4,000–4,500 4 guns

Casualties and losses
829 killed, 2,482 wounded or 3,500+	1,500 killed & wounded 2,289–2,300 prisoners

The Battle of Gorni Dubnik took place during the Russo-Turkish War on 24 October 1877. In an effort to reduce the fortress of Pleven quicker, Russian forces began targeting garrisons along the Ottoman supply and communications route. A significant garrison had been reduced at the Battle of Lovcha in September. General Joseph Vladimirovich Gourko was called up from the Shipka Pass area to deal with more of the garrisons protecting Pleven.

On October 24 Gourko attacked the fortress of Gorni-Dubnik. The Russian attack met heavy resistance but two other Russian columns were able to easily push back the Ottoman lines. The Finnish Guard sharpshooter battalion participated on the battle and stormed the fortress walls. Gourko continued the attacks and the garrison commander Ahmed Hifzi Pasha surrendered. Within the month several more Ottoman garrisons were to fall including Orhanie. By October 24 the Russian army had surrounded Plevna which capitulated December 10.

The battle is commemorated in the Finnish Guard Regiment March. October 24 is the honorary day of the descendant of the Finnish Guards' Rifle Battalion, the Finnish Guard Jaeger Regiment.

== See also ==
- Battles of the Russo-Turkish War (1877–1878)

== Sources ==
- Greene, F. V. (2008). The Russian Army and Its Campaigns in Turkey in 1877-1878. Swedenborg Press. ISBN 978-1-4437-8531-0.
- Sword of the Motherland Historical Foundation
- Compton's Home Library: Battles of the World CD-ROM
- Shefov, Nikolay (2002). Битвы России. Военно-историческая библиотека. Moscow: АСТ. pp. 140–141. ISBN 5-17-010649-1.
