= Finnish Life Guards Regiment =

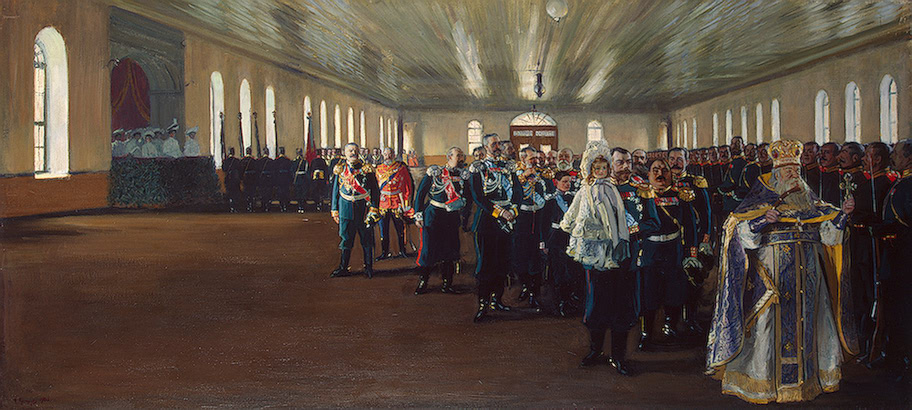
Church parade of the Finland Guards Regiment, December 12, 1905 (Julian calendar). Painting by Boris Kustodiev

Finliandsky Guard Regiment (Russian: Финляндский лейб-гвардии полк) was a Russian Imperial Guard infantry regiment.

== Campaigns ==
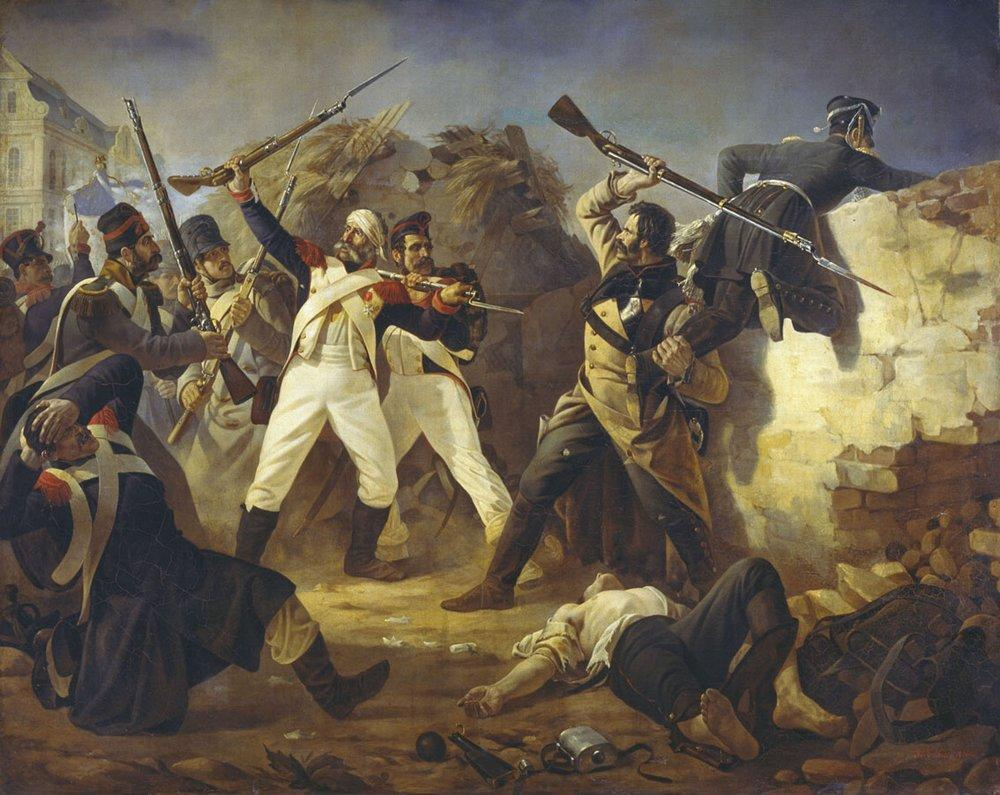
- Grenadier Leontiy Korennoj saves higher officers, Leipzig 1813
  1807–1813 – Napoleonic Wars
- 1828–1829 – Russo-Turkish War
- 1831 – Polish campaign.
- 1863–1864 – Polish campaign.
- 1877–1878 – Russo-Turkish War.
- 1914–1917 – First World War. (Eastern Front)

== See also ==
- Finnish Rifle Battalion

== Sources ==
- Gorokhoff, Gerard. Russian Imperial Guard. 2002.
- Handbook of the Russian Army 1914 by the British General Staff. Battery Press reprint edition, 1996.
