= Ahmed Hifzi Pasha =

Ottoman field marshal

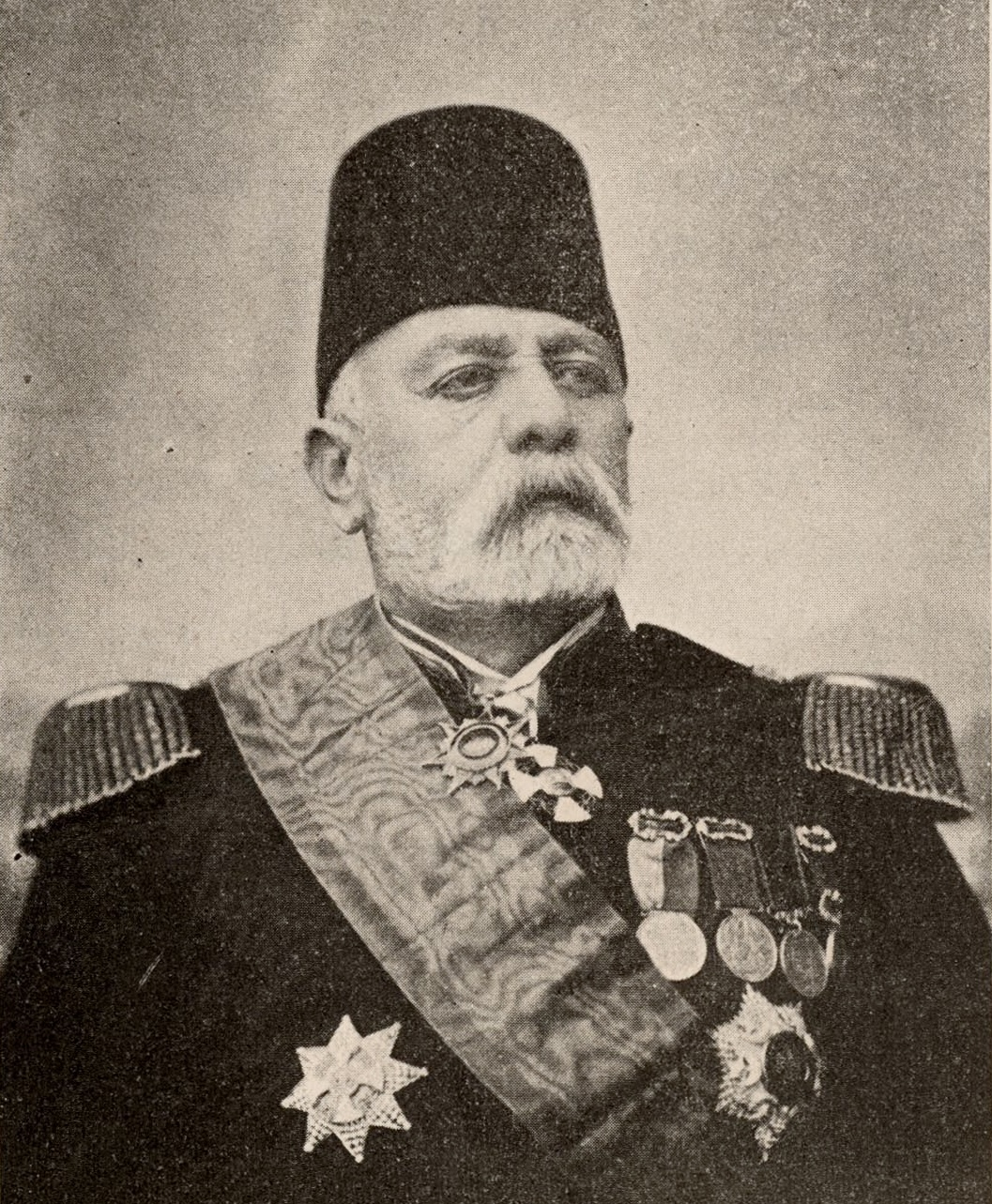
- Born: Ahmed Hifzi; 1832; Ankara, Ottoman Empire
- Died: 1900 (aged 67–68); Istanbul, Ottoman Empire
- Military career
- Allegiance: Ottoman Empire
- Branch: Ottoman Army
- Rank: Field marshal
- Conflicts: Battle of Gorni Dubnik; Greco-Turkish War (1897)

Ahmed Hifzi Pasha (1832 – 1900) was an Ottoman field marshal, who was the Commander-in-Chief of the Ottoman Army that defeated the Greeks on the Epirus front in the Greco-Turkish War (1897). He was also the commander in the Battle of Gorni Dubnik in October 1877, the governor of Kosovo between June 1881 and July 1898, and the governor of Ioannina between October 1889 and October 1897.
