= Guard Jaeger Regiment =

- Kaartin Jääkärirykmentti
- Insignia of the Guard Jaeger Regiment.
- Active: 1996–present
- Country: Finland
- Branch: Army
- Type: Foot Guards
- Role: Guard Battalion - Urban Warfare/Public Duties; Uusimaa Jaeger Battalion - Urban Warfare
- Size: 2 battalions
- Garrison/HQ: Santahamina
- Flag
- Anniversaries: 16 August

Commanders
- Current commander: Colonel Matti Honko
- Commander-in-Chief: President of Finland

The Guard Jaeger Regiment (Finnish: Kaartin jääkärirykmentti; Swedish: Gardesjägarregementet) is a Finnish Army unit located in Santahamina, an island district of Helsinki. The regiment trains guard jaegers for fighting military operations in urban terrain (MOUT). The primary function of wartime units formed from the reservists trained by the regiment would be the defence of the capital Helsinki.

== Organisation ==
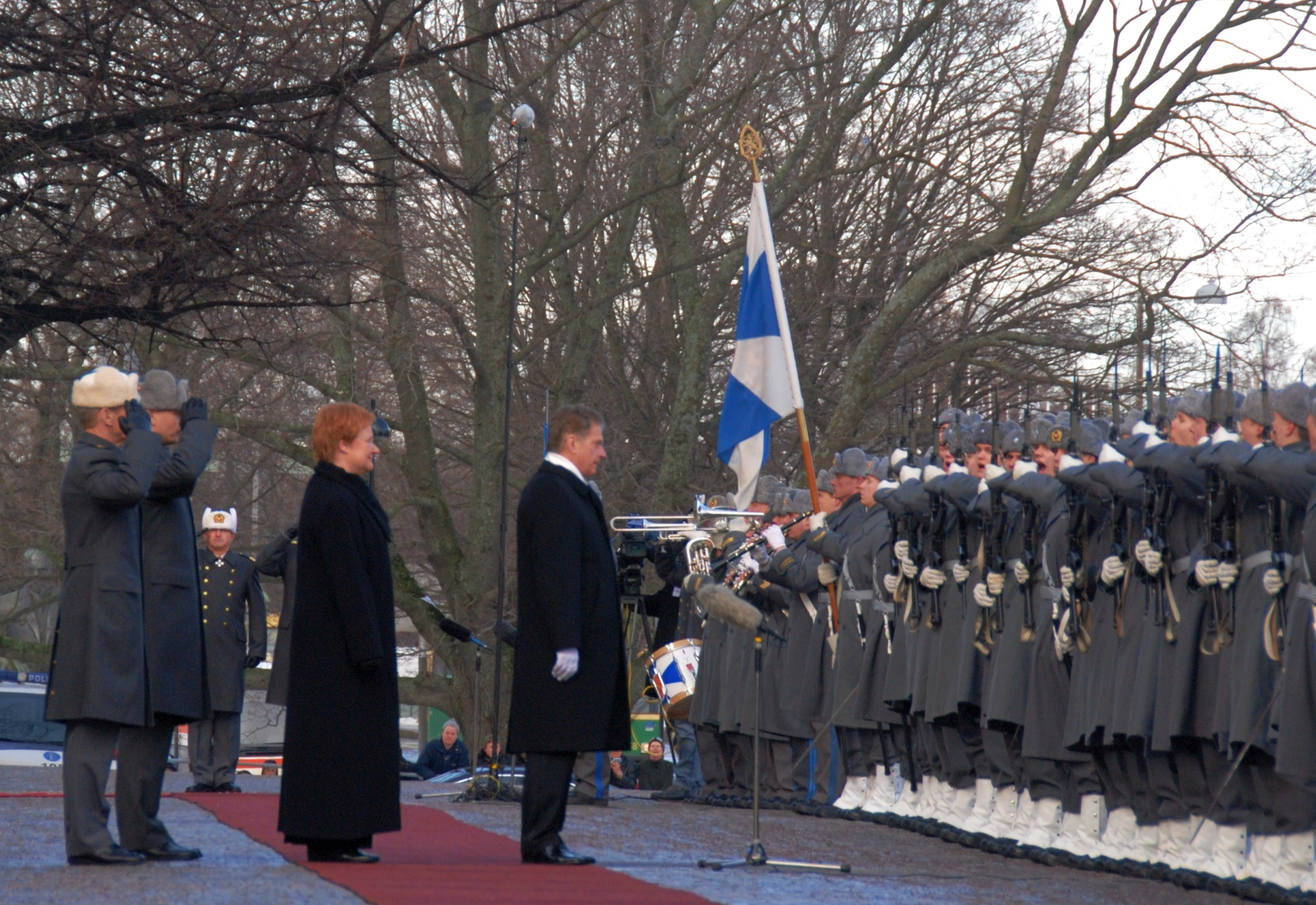

The commander of the regiment commands the following units:

- Command (Esikunta)
  - Personnel division (Henkilöstöosasto)
  - Training division (Koulutusosasto)
  - Operative division (Operatiivinen osasto)
  - Logistics Center (Huoltokeskus)
  - Helsinki Guard (Helsingin vartiosto)
- Guard Battalion (KAARTP)
  - 1. Military Police Company (1. SPOLK)
  - 2. Military Police Company (2. SPOLK)
  - Transport Company (KULJK)
- Uusimaa Jaeger Battalion (UUDJP)
  - 1st Jaeger Company (1. JK)
  - HQ and Signals Company (EVK)
  - Non-commissioned Officer School (AUK)
- Sports School (URHK)
  - Reconnaissance Company (TIEDK)
  - Coaching center (VALMKESK)

Additionally the assistant commander commands the following functions

- Uusimaa Regional Office (Uudenmaan aluetoimisto)
- The Guards Band (Kaartin Soittokunta)

The primary function of the regiment is to train all wartime units from the conscripts serving in the regiment, specializing in the production of FIBUA-trained units. In addition, the regiment is the ceremonial unit of the Finnish Defence Forces, responsible for the Guard of Honour of the President of Finland. The Guards Band is similarly the representative band of the Defence Forces. As the largest unit located in the Garrison of Helsinki, the regiment is responsible for almost all the supplies of the troops and headquarters located in the capital region.

The conscripts of the regiment arrive mostly from the capital region and surrounding region of Uusimaa. In addition, the regiment is one of the most usual placements for the expatriate Finns and recently naturalized immigrants. The conscripts serving in special duties at the Defence Staff are also formally part of the regiment.

== History ==
The Guard Jaeger Regiment continue the traditions of historical units that include the 3rd Finnish Guards' Rifle Battalion (Finnish: Henkivartioväen 3. Suomalainen tarkk’ampujapataljoona, Swedish: Livgardets 3:e Finska Skarpskyttebataljon), which had from the year 1829 Young Guard and from the year 1878 onwards Old Guard status in the Imperial Russian Army, the Jaegers of the Finnish Civil War and the 2nd Jaeger Battalion from the Second World War.

The traditions are kept alive by the Guard Jaeger Regiment Guild.
